= A Sin to Err =

- Agent Carter episode
- Episode no.: Season 1 Episode 6
- Directed by: Stephen Williams
- Written by: Lindsey Allen
- Cinematography by: Gabriel Beristain
- Editing by: David J. Siegel
- Original air date: February 10, 2015
- Running time: 41 minutes

Guest appearances
- Lyndsy Fonseca as Angie Martinelli; Ralph Brown as Ivchenko; Bridget Regan as Dottie Underwood; Meagen Fay as Miriam Fry; Rick Peters as Honicky; Devin Ratray as Sheldon McFee; Steven Hack as Albert; Dimiter Marinov as Fyodor

Episode chronology
← Previous "The Iron Ceiling"	Next → "Snafu"
- Agent Carter season 1

"A Sin to Err" is the sixth episode of the first season of the American television series Agent Carter, inspired by the films Captain America: The First Avenger and Captain America: The Winter Soldier, and the Marvel One-Shot short film also titled Agent Carter. It features the Marvel Comics character Peggy Carter as she hunts for a Russian spy in New York, and is set in the Marvel Cinematic Universe (MCU), sharing continuity with the films of the franchise. The episode was written by Lindsey Allen and directed by Stephen Williams.

Hayley Atwell reprises her role as Carter from the film series, and is joined by regular cast members James D'Arcy, Chad Michael Murray, Enver Gjokaj, and Shea Whigham. Recurring guest star Bridget Regan portrays Dottie Underwood, the Russian spy.

"A Sin to Err" originally aired on ABC on February 10, 2015, and according to Nielsen Media Research, was watched by 4.25 million viewers.

== Plot ==
Peggy Carter and Edwin Jarvis investigate the women that Howard Stark has been involved with over the last six months, believing that a female Leviathan operative may have been used against Stark and to kill Ray Krzeminski, but their search is unsuccessful. Daniel Sousa reveals to Roger Dooley that Carter is an apparent traitor, and all agents are tasked with tracking her down. They eventually corner her and Jarvis, but Carter fights them off. During the commotion, Dr. Ivchenko, who is actually working for Leviathan, hypnotizes Agent Yauch, who reveals that only Agent Dooley can access Stark's weapons. Yauch shows Ivchenko how to get out of the Strategic Scientific Reserve (SSR), before Ivchenko forces him to commit suicide by walking in traffic to be hit by a truck. Carter retrieves Steve Rogers' blood from her apartment which she had earlier hidden. As she tries to escape the building, she is knocked out by Dottie Underwood, but not before realizing that Underwood is the Leviathan operative. Underwood is about to kill Carter when Jack Thompson and Sousa arrive. She feigns ignorance, and the agents arrest Carter.

== Production ==
=== Development ===
In January 2015, Marvel announced that the sixth episode would be titled "A Sin to Err", to be written by Lindsey Allen, with Stephen Williams directing.

=== Casting ===
In January 2015, Marvel revealed that main cast members Hayley Atwell, James D'Arcy, Chad Michael Murray, Enver Gjokaj, and Shea Whigham would star as Peggy Carter, Edwin Jarvis, Jack Thompson, Daniel Sousa, and Roger Dooley, respectively. It was also revealed that the guest cast for the episode would include Lyndsy Fonseca as Angie Martinelli, Alexander Carroll as Agent Yauch, Ralph Brown as Dr. Ivchenko, Meagen Fay as Miriam Fry, Bridget Regan as Dottie Underwood, Devin Ratray as Sheldon McFee, Steven Hack as Albert, Rick Peters as Dr. Honicky, Dimiter D. Marinov as Fyodor, Dave Matos as Pasha, Victoria Profeta as Josephine, Yasmine Aker as Thelma, Krista Marie Yu as Edith, Kellen Michael as Small Boy, Joyce Greenleaf as Esther, Mike Massa as SSR Agent #1, Marcus Young as SSR Agent #2, and Denney Pierce as SSR Agent #3. However, Carroll, Matos, Profeta, Aker, Yu, Michael, Greenleaf, Massa, Young, and Pierce did not receive guest star credit in the episode. Fonseca, Carroll, Brown, Fay, Regan, and Ratray reprise their roles from earlier in the series.

== Release ==
"A Sin to Err" was first aired in the United States on ABC on February 10, 2015.

The episode was released on Blu-ray and DVD along with the rest of the first season on September 18, 2015, as an Amazon exclusive in the U.S. "A Sin to Err" debuted on Hulu on November 29, 2017, after it acquired the exclusive streaming rights to the series, and was made available on Disney+ at launch, on November 12, 2019, along with the rest of the series.

== Reception ==
=== Ratings ===
In the United States the episode received a 1.4/4 percent share among adults between the ages of 18 and 49, meaning that it was seen by 1.4 percent of all households, and 4 percent of all of those watching television at the time of the broadcast. It was watched by 4.25 million viewers.
