= Agent Carter season 1 =

Agent Carter
- Season 1
- Promotional poster and DVD region 2 and 4 home media cover art
- Showrunners: Tara Butters; Michele Fazekas; Chris Dingess
- Starring: Hayley Atwell; James D'Arcy; Chad Michael Murray; Enver Gjokaj; Shea Whigham
- No. of episodes: 8

Release
- Original network: ABC
- Original release: January 6 – February 24, 2015

Season chronology
- Next → Season 2

The first season of the American television series Agent Carter, which is inspired by the film Captain America: The First Avenger and the Marvel One-Shot short film of the same name, features the character Peggy Carter, based on the Marvel Comics character of the same name, as she must balance doing administrative work and going on secret missions for Howard Stark while trying to navigate life as a single woman in 1940s America. It is set in the Marvel Cinematic Universe (MCU), sharing continuity with the films of the franchise, and was produced by ABC Studios, Marvel Television, and Fazekas & Butters. Tara Butters, Michele Fazekas, and Chris Dingess served as showrunners.

Hayley Atwell reprises her role from the film series and One-Shot as Carter, with James D'Arcy, Chad Michael Murray, Enver Gjokaj, and Shea Whigham also starring. In May 2014, ABC bypassed a pilot, ordering a show based on the One-Shot straight to series for an eight-episode season. Filming took place in Los Angeles from September 2014 to January 2015, and Industrial Light & Magic provided visual effects. The season introduces the origins of several characters and storylines from MCU films, while other characters from the films and Marvel One-Shots also appear.

The season, which aired on ABC from January 6 to February 24, 2015, over 8 episodes, aired during the season two mid-season break of Agents of S.H.I.E.L.D. Despite steadily dropping viewership, critical response to Agent Carter was positive, with much praise going to Atwell's performance, the series' tone and setting, and its relative separation from the rest of the MCU. The series was renewed for a second season on May 7, 2015.

== Episodes ==
No. overall	No. in season	Title	Directed by	Written by	Original release date	U.S. viewers (millions)
1	1	"Now is Not the End"	Louis D'Esposito	Christopher Markus & Stephen McFeely	January 6, 2015	6.91
In 1946, Peggy Carter, mourning the apparent death of Steve Rogers, (Note: As depicted in Captain America: The First Avenger.) returns to work for the Strategic Scientific Reserve (SSR) in New York City following the end of World War II. The SSR investigates industrialist Howard Stark for apparently selling weapons to enemies of the United States. Stark secretly contacts Carter, and asks her to help him clear his name. Before he leaves the country, he tells her about his formula for molecular nitramene that is going to be sold at a club. Infiltrating the club in disguise, Carter learns that the formula has been weaponized. She shows one such nitramene bomb to Stark Industries scientist Anton Vanko, who deduces that it came from a Roxxon Oil refinery. Carter, along with Stark's butler Edwin Jarvis, investigates the refinery, and encounters Leet Brannis, who apparently works for an organization called Leviathan, and escapes with a truck full of the nitramene weapons. Before leaving, Brannis drops a nitramene bomb, and as Carter and Jarvis escape, it destroys the entire building.
2	2	"Bridge and Tunnel"	Joseph V. Russo	Eric Pearson	January 6, 2015	6.91
Carter goes undercover again to search for the truck with the weapons, and finds the address of the truck's official driver. The SSR agents interrogate Miles Van Ert, the Roxxon scientist who made the weapons, and learn of the address as well. Carter and Jarvis arrive at the house first, and find Brannis, who they force to go with them. The three are attacked by Sasha Demidov, who works for Leviathan, an organization that it now seems Brannis has betrayed. Carter fights Demidov, but he still manages to mortally wound Brannis. Jumping to safety with Carter and Brannis, Jarvis forces the truck to careen off a cliff with Demidov, and the weapons inside implode. Before he dies, Brannis draws a symbol in the dirt. SSR agents Roger Dooley, Jack Thompson, and Daniel Sousa later arrive to find Brannis's body, a woman's footprints, and a hotel key (belonging to Demidov). Meanwhile, Agent Ray Krzeminski, sifting through the Roxxon refinery remains, finds the license plate for Stark's car that Jarvis and Carter used to get away.
3	3	"Time and Tide"	Scott Winant	Andi Bushell	January 13, 2015	5.10
Dooley and Krzeminski investigate Demidov's hotel room, and discover a typewriter. Thompson and Sousa take Jarvis in for interrogation, and the former threatens him with revealing an old treason charge to the immigration office. Carter, feigning ignorance, botches the interrogation to get Jarvis out, and receives a stern reprimand from Dooley. Carter and Jarvis then follow the sewer system below Stark's vault, through which Brannis took the stolen technology, to the docks, where they find the weapons on board The Heartbreak (a ship bearing Brannis' symbol). Jarvis anonymously gives the SSR their location, while Carter fights off a guard who had been working with Brannis. Carter and Jarvis are forced to leave him behind as the SSR arrives. While being transported back to SSR headquarters by Krzeminski, the guard is about to identify Carter as the woman interfering with the Stark investigation, when an unidentified assassin kills them both.
4	4	"The Blitzkrieg Button"	Stephen Cragg	Brant Englestein	January 27, 2015	4.63
After learning that Brannis and Demidov were supposed to have died during the Battle of Finow, Dooley travels to Germany to speak with Ernst Mueller, the Nazi colonel who led the opposing forces, and though he doesn't learn how Brannis and Demidov survived, Dooley does discover that their Soviet forces were seemingly massacred before the Nazis even arrived. With Carter's only job to collect lunch orders, she meets up with Stark, who has secretly returned in the wake of his technology's discovery. Looking at photographs Carter takes of the weapons, he identifies one of them as the Blitzkrieg Button, which he claims can cause a permanent blackout throughout the city. However, a suspicious Carter opens the device to find a vial of Rogers' blood. Angry at Stark for lying to her, she hides the vial. Otto Mink, the criminal who smuggled Stark into New York, but was scammed out of his money by Carter and Jarvis, follows Carter back to her apartment, but he is killed by her new neighbor, Dottie Underwood.
5	5	"The Iron Ceiling"	Peter Leto	Jose Molina	February 3, 2015	4.20
Carter decrypts an encoded message, received from Leviathan through Demidov's typewriter, for the SSR, learning that Stark will be selling weapons to Leviathan at a Soviet military complex. Thompson is sent to stop the sale and apprehend Stark, and is forced to take Carter when she enlists the help of her war comrades, the Howling Commandos. They discover that young girls are trained at the complex to infiltrate the US as sleeper agents, and realize that they have walked into a trap when one girl kills the Commando Junior Juniper. Soviet soldiers attack the team and Thompson freezes under fire, but Carter ensures that they escape, along with imprisoned psychiatrist Dr. Ivchenko. Meanwhile, Underwood, who is actually a sleeper agent trained at that complex, discovers the photos of Stark's weapons in SSR custody when searching Carter's apartment, while Sousa realizes that Carter is the woman who has been interfering with the SSR's investigation.
6	6	"A Sin to Err"	Stephen Williams	Lindsey Allen	February 10, 2015	4.25
Carter and Jarvis investigate the women that Stark has been involved with over the last six months, believing that a female Leviathan operative may have been used against Stark and to kill Krzeminski, but their search is unsuccessful. Sousa reveals to Dooley that Carter is an apparent traitor, and all agents are tasked with tracking her down. They eventually corner her and Jarvis, but Carter fights them off. During the commotion, Dr. Ivchenko, who is actually working for Leviathan, hypnotizes Agent Yauch, who reveals that only Dooley can access Stark's weapons. Yauch shows Ivchenko how to get out of the SSR, before Ivchenko forces him to commit suicide. Carter retrieves Rogers' blood from her apartment. As she tries to escape the building, she is knocked out by Underwood, but not before realizing that Underwood is the Leviathan operative. Underwood is about to kill Carter when Thompson and Sousa arrive. She feigns ignorance, and the agents arrest Carter.
7	7	"Snafu"	Vincent Misiano	Chris Dingess	February 17, 2015	4.15
As Carter is resisting interrogation at the SSR, Jarvis appears with a fake signed confession from Stark, promising surrender if Carter is released. Carter sees Ivchenko communicating in Morse code with Underwood, and reveals the truth about her own investigation to her colleagues to gain their trust. Ivchenko hypnotizes Dooley and has him steal one of Stark's weapons from the SSR's labs: a gas cylinder that Underwood and Ivchenko activate in a crowded cinema before leaving and locking the door behind them. The agents find Dooley wearing a Stark experimental vest given to him by Ivchenko, which Jarvis explains will explode with no way to deactivate it. Dooley jumps out a window moments before the device detonates, killing him but saving the others. The gas in the cinema makes many in the audience become maniacal and attack each other violently, and when an usher arrives soon after, the entire audience is dead.
8	8	"Valediction"	Christopher Misiano	Michele Fazekas & Tara Butters	February 24, 2015	4.02
The SSR discovers the gas cylinder in the cinema and realize that Ivchenko possibly plans to turn all of New York on itself. Stark returns and explains that he had developed the gas, named Midnight Oil, to give American soldiers extra stamina during war, but it caused psychosis and lead to them killing each other. During World War II, the American military stole Midnight Oil and used it on the Soviets at Finow. Stark believes that Ivchenko – real name Johann Fennhoff – blames Stark for the ensuing massacre, and allows the SSR to use him as bait to draw Leviathan out. This plan goes awry when Underwood distracts the agents while Fennhoff kidnaps Stark, and uses hypnosis to convince him to drop the gas on Times Square. At Stark's secret plane hangar, Sousa apprehends Fennhoff while Carter defeats Underwood (who escapes) and convinces Stark not to drop the gas on the city. Carter later discards Rogers' blood in the East River, finally moving on with her life, while Fennhoff is imprisoned with the scheming Arnim Zola.

== Cast and characters ==
=== Main ===
- Hayley Atwell as Peggy Carter
- James D'Arcy as Edwin Jarvis
- Chad Michael Murray as Jack Thompson
- Enver Gjokaj as Daniel Sousa
- Shea Whigham as Roger Dooley

=== Recurring ===
- Dominic Cooper as Howard Stark
- Lyndsy Fonseca as Angie Martinelli
- Kyle Bornheimer as Ray Krzeminski
- Meagen Fay as Miriam Fry
- Bridget Regan as Dottie Underwood
- Ralph Brown as Johann Fennhoff

=== Notable guests ===
- Costa Ronin as Anton Vanko
- Neal McDonough as Timothy "Dum Dum" Dugan
- Toby Jones as Arnim Zola

== Production ==
=== Development ===
By September 2013, Marvel Television was developing a series inspired by the Agent Carter One-Shot short film, featuring the Marvel Comics character Peggy Carter. On May 8, 2014, ABC officially ordered the series, bypassing a pilot order, and later confirmed that Agent Carter would air between the 2014 finale and 2015 premiere of the second season of Agents of S.H.I.E.L.D., beginning January 6, 2015. Later in May, star Hayley Atwell stated that the season would consist of eight episodes. Executive producers for the season include Tara Butters, Michelle Fazekas, Christopher Markus, Stephen McFeely, Chris Dingess, Kevin Feige, Louis D'Esposito, Alan Fine, Joe Quesada, Stan Lee, and Jeph Loeb. Butters, Fazekas, and Dingess serve as showrunners on the season.

=== Writing ===
Markus & McFeely, writers on the Captain America films, had written a script for the first episode by January 2014. They stated in March that the series would be set in 1946, occurring in the middle of the timeline established in the One-Shot. In July, Butters and Fazekas revealed that writing for the rest of the season would begin in August 2014.

In July 2014, Fazekas stated that it was "fabulous from a writing perspective" to have an eight episode order, as "you can plan it and know where you're heading... They're all their own stories and they all have their own drive, but it's sort of building toward a big thing at the end of the eight episodes." Elaborating on this, Atwell said, "it's incredibly tight, the script, which is great. It's fast moving and fast paced but luckily because it's not stretched out of 22 episodes, nothing is diluted. Every line is vital to not only moving the story and the action [along] but also developing the characters." The season's overarching storyline revolves around the chemical weapon Midnight Oil, which is based on the Madbomb of the Captain America comics. The Madbomb was originally considered for use in Captain America: Civil War, before negotiations with actors to adapt the "Civil War" storyline were completed. Also in July, it was revealed that Carter's husband would be explored in the series. However, he was ultimately not explored much in the first season, with McFeely saying, "This was the season where she says goodbye to Steve [Rogers]... In a second season, she could be freer to have those conversations about a life after him."

Speaking about the season's use of 1940s terminology, Fazekas stated that terms like "broad" and "dame" were preferably avoided, while research was done to ensure terms that were used in the series were actually in use during that time, with Fazekas giving the example, "you know what didn't exist in 1946? Smart ass. I looked up the etymology on that, didn't exist in 1946. Turns out it was a term that came around in the 60s. But for instance, I wrote a line that said, "Oh I think someone's yanking your chain." And I had to look it up, did that exist in 1946? And actually it did; it's a mining term that exists from a long time ago. That's our research that we do." Research was also done on radio shows of the time to ensure realism when creating the fictional Captain America Adventure Program, with details discovered and replicated on the series including the use of lobsters and ham to create sound effects for the radio show. The Griffith Hotel, the all-women boarding house where Carter lives, is based on the real-life Barbizon Hotel for Women. Butters felt that while working in the time period, it became an issue to not sound "too period". Additionally, it was difficult to write British people from the time in order to avoid stereotypes such as the "typical British butler". However, D'Arcy, who is British, felt the writing staff wrote the British characters better than anyone else he had worked with, despite there not being any British writers on the staff.

=== Casting ===
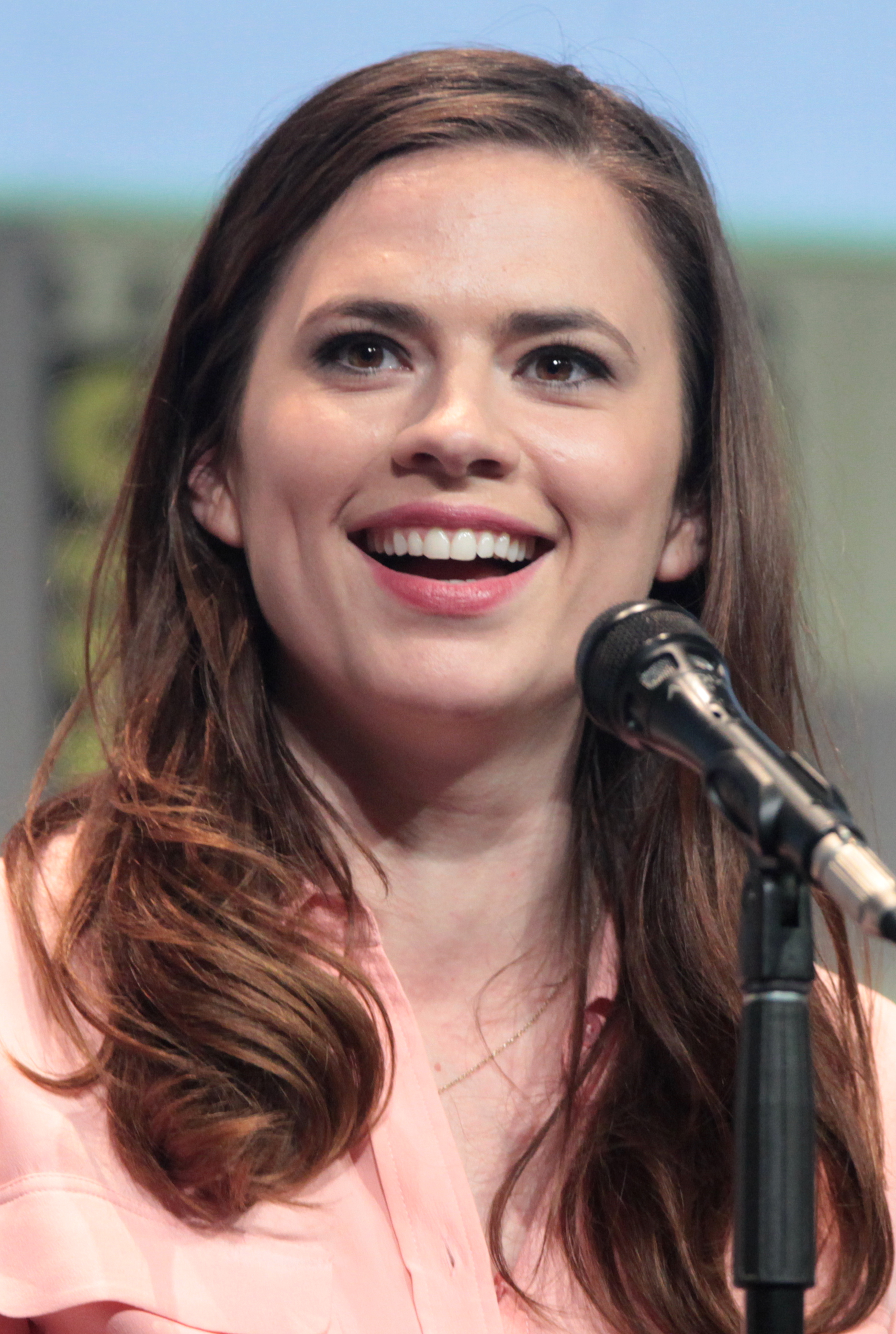
Hayley Atwell reprises her film role as Peggy Carter, the titular character of the television series.

The main cast for the season includes Hayley Atwell as Peggy Carter, reprising her role from the film series, James D'Arcy as Edwin Jarvis, Chad Michael Murray as Jack Thompson, Enver Gjokaj as Daniel Sousa, and Shea Whigham as Roger Dooley.

In March 2014, Markus and McFeely stated that Howard Stark would be a recurring character, contingent on Dominic Cooper's involvement. In June 2014, Atwell confirmed that Cooper would be involved with the series. Kyle Bornheimer, Ralph Brown, Meagen Fay, Lyndsy Fonseca, and Bridget Regan also recur as Ray Krzeminski, Johann Fennhoff, Miriam Fry, Angie Martinelli, and Dottie Underwood, respectively, throughout the series.

In November 2014, it was announced that Costa Ronin would portray a younger version of Anton Vanko, who was portrayed in Iron Man 2 by Yevgeni Lazarev. Chris Evans appears as Steve Rogers / Captain America via archive footage from The First Avenger. Neal McDonough and Toby Jones also reprise their roles of Timothy "Dum Dum" Dugan and Arnim Zola from previous MCU films, One-Shots, and television series during the season.

=== Filming ===
Filming began in Los Angeles around late September – early October 2014, with the working title Nylon, and was completed on January 20, 2015. Filming occurred at "every back lot" in Los Angeles, including Universal Studios Lot, Paramount, and Warner Bros. Studios Burbank, with location filming occurring at Los Angeles City Hall, Griffith Park, Royce Canyon, the marina in San Pedro, and the Port of Los Angeles.

Cinematographer Gabriel Beristain, returning from the One-Shot, used a combination of modern digital technology and traditional analog techniques to replicate the feel of classic films that are set in the 1940s, but to also have the convenience and consistency of modern technology. Beristain uses the Arri Alexa digital camera, along with Leica lenses and silk-stocking diffusion nets, the latter on which he recalled "I had last used in the 1980s in England on videos and commercials. I remembered that they were fantastic. In combination with the Leica lenses, the look is very classic, very much like a 1940s film. When I saw it, I said, 'This is absolutely Marvel,' and [D'Esposito] agreed." For the series' lighting, Beristain again mixed modern and traditional, using LED fixtures to recreate classic Hollywood lighting. He called his lighting of Atwell "an homage to the great cinematographers who lit Lauren Bacall and Grace Kelly."

=== Visual effects ===
Sheena Duggal, who served as visual effects supervisor on the Agent Carter One-Shot, returned to the position for the series, while the companies Industrial Light & Magic (ILM) and Base FX created the visual effects. Work by ILM includes the creation of backdrops for the series, including matte paintings, depicting 1940s New York. DNeg TV also created visual effects, with ILM coordinating with them and Base to maintain a "seamless workflow". The season had 1,038 visual effects shots, with multiple episodes being worked on in post-production simultaneously to complete the work. In addition to all the set extensions required to depict the period through green screen and matte paintings, Duggal also noted difficulty in simulating the imploding bombs and creating a fully CG truck that drives off a cliff.

=== Music ===
In September 2014, Christopher Lennertz officially signed on to compose for the series, having previously composed the Agent Carter One-Shot. Lennertz combined all the different style elements of the show in the music, such as mixing jazz and period elements, with orchestra and electronic elements. In his research of the music of the time period, Lennertz learned that jazz was shifting from big band to smaller ensembles, and bebop was being introduced. This allowed him to incorporate trumpets in his scores, to harken to the time period and because they are "also very sneaky, and it lends itself to espionage". Lennertz used the alto flute to capture "Carter's aura", saying, "It feels like a strong woman's voice, especially as she's sneaking around....it also has that spy quality." Additionally, Lennertz was able to reorchestrate "Star Spangled Man" for the season, which is originally by Alan Menken for Captain America: The First Avenger, and introduced a folk choral piece performed by a Russian men's choir during "The Iron Ceiling". A soundtrack album for the season was released on iTunes on December 11, 2015.

All music composed by Christopher Lennertz.

No.	Title	Length
1.	"Peggy Remembers Cap"	1:51
2.	"Back Alley Surprise"	0:58
3.	"Bad Babies"	2:52
4.	"Typewriter Spy Messages"	1:26
5.	"Green Man Fight"	2:02
6.	"Blindes and Money"	1:29
7.	"Roxxon Plant Implosion"	5:14
8.	"Morning After Shooting"	1:42
9.	"Dairy Van Implosion"	1:31
10.	"Dottie's Training"	1:17
11.	"Forgot the Password"	1:23
12.	"Thompson's Navy Cross"	1:37
13.	"Instill Fear"	3:09
14.	"Dottie Sneaks In"	3:47
15.	"Peggy Saves Thompson"	6:13
16.	"Dottie and Doctor Plot"	2:52
17.	"Inside the Minds of Soldiers"	2:38
18.	"Interrogating Peggy"	2:08
19.	"Enter Dooley's Head"	1:09
20.	"Leviathan is Coming"	0:57
21.	"I'm Invisible to You"	1:55
22.	"Doctor and Dottie Escape with Item"	1:40
23.	"Vest of Destruction"	4:18
24.	"Check the Rooftops"	1:44
25.	"Bring Him Home"	1:23
26.	"Badass Girl Fight"	2:12
27.	"We Have to Let Him Go"	2:10
28.	"Peggy Gets Her Respect"	2:26
29.	"Honored to Assist You"	1:28
Total length:		65:31

=== Marvel Cinematic Universe tie-ins ===
Markus, talking about the series place in the greater architecture of the MCU in January 2015 said "you really only need to drop the tiniest bit of hint and its connected. You don't have to go, "Howard Stark's wearing the same pants that Tony wears!" ... Everything is enhanced just by the knowledge that its all connected." The season introduces the Red Room program, which would eventually produce Natasha Romanoff, who appears in multiple MCU films portrayed by Scarlett Johansson. Although the origins of the program are explored, the term "Black Widow" is never used in the series. Agent Carter also explores the origins of the Hydra-led Winter Soldier program, as seen by the end tag in "Valediction" when Arnim Zola approaches Faustus about mind control. The law firm Goodman, Kurtzberg, and Holliway is mentioned, with a modern-day version of the law firm, Goodman, Lieber, Kurtzberg, and Holliway, appearing in the Marvel Studios Disney+ series She-Hulk: Attorney at Law (2022).

== Marketing ==
In the lead up to the airing of the series, Atwell made several appearances as Carter in Agents of S.H.I.E.L.D.'s second season. Footage from the first episode was shown at New York Comic Con on October 10, 2014, and again in ABC's one-hour television special, Marvel 75 Years: From Pulp to Pop!, which aired in November 2014. The first teaser for the series debuted during Agents of S.H.I.E.L.D. on October 28, 2014, with the tagline "Sometimes the best man for the job ... is a woman." Though the trailer itself was received positively, the tagline was criticized as "awful" and "ridiculous", and Alan Sepinwall of HitFix said "I get that one of the themes of the show will be Peggy dealing with the sexism of the time, but these ads exist in 2014, not 1945. Please find a new tagline."

== Release ==
=== Broadcast ===
Agent Carter debuted in the United States and Canada as a two-hour series premiere on January 6, 2015, on ABC and CTV, respectively. It began airing in New Zealand on TV2 on February 11, 2015. In October 2014, Channel 4, the channel that airs Agents of S.H.I.E.L.D. in the United Kingdom, stated that they did not "have any current plans [to air] Agent Carter". In June 2015, FOX UK purchased the broadcast rights for the United Kingdom, with the series premiering on July 12, 2015.

=== Home media and streaming ===
The season was released on Blu-ray and DVD on September 18, 2015, as an Amazon exclusive. On November 29, 2017, Hulu acquired the exclusive streaming rights to the series, and the season was made available on Disney+ at launch, on November 12, 2019.

== Reception ==
=== Ratings ===
Viewership and ratings per episode of Agent Carter season 1
No.	Title	Air date	Rating/share (18–49)	Viewers (millions)	DVR (18–49)	DVR viewers (millions)	Total (18–49)	Total viewers (millions)
1	"Now is Not the End"	January 6, 2015	1.9/6	6.91	1.1	3.25	3.0	10.16
2	"Bridge and Tunnel"	January 6, 2015	1.9/6	6.91	1.1	3.25	3.0	10.16
3	"Time and Tide"	January 13, 2015	1.5/4	5.10	0.8	2.56	2.3	7.66
4	"The Blitzkrieg Button"	January 27, 2015	1.3/4	4.63	1.0	2.54	2.3	7.16
5	"The Iron Ceiling"	February 3, 2015	1.3/4	4.20	—N/a	—N/a	—N/a	—N/a
6	"A Sin to Err"	February 10, 2015	1.4/4	4.25	0.9	—N/a	2.3	—N/a
7	"Snafu"	February 17, 2015	1.4/4	4.15	0.8	2.09	2.2	6.24
8	"Valediction"	February 24, 2015	1.3/4	4.02	0.9	—N/a	2.2	—N/a

The season averaged 7.14 million total viewers, including from DVR, ranking 74th among network series in the 2014–15 television season. It also had an average total 18-49 rating of 2.3, which was 46th.

=== Critical response ===
The review aggregator website Rotten Tomatoes reported a 96% approval rating with an average rating of 7.90/10 based on 50 reviews. The website's consensus reads, "Focusing on Peggy Carter as a person first and an action hero second makes Marvel's Agent Carter a winning, stylish drama with bursts of excitement and an undercurrent of cheeky fun". Metacritic, which uses a weighted average, assigned a score of 73 out of 100 based on 27 reviews, indicating "generally favorable" reviews.

Brian Lowry, reviewing the two-part premiere for Variety, felt that giving Atwell her own television series was "a pretty smart bet" by Marvel, and he called the episodes "considerable fun". He noted the period setting as contributing to this, and positively mentioned the score by composer Christopher Lennertz. Darren Franich of Entertainment Weekly felt that "the show isn't as retro-stylish as it thinks it is ... the first hour of Agent Carter feels like an above-average episode of Young Indiana Jones Chronicles", noting that it tonally aims for His Girl Friday, Dick Tracy, and Alias ("A tough tonal mixture on a weekly broadcast budget, but also an ambition worth pursuing"), but praised Atwell's performance, calling her "a delight" and "firing on all cylinders". Franich was negative about what he saw to be common MCU tropes, notably "Somebody named Stark invented something dangerous; everyone wants an All-Important Glowing Thing; there's an implicit promise that nothing will be solved for weeks/years to come." Though he was wary about the series being forced to contribute to the rest of the MCU, he did note that "Agent Carter feels pleasantly segmented off from the greater Marvel Machinery".

Eric Goldman of IGN gave the first season an 8.8 out of 10, saying, "Agent Carter didn't need to succeed by setting up something to pay off in Guardians of the Galaxy 2 – it just needed to be an entertaining, involving show. And boy, was it." He also praised the Peggy and Jarvis dynamic, the MCU tie-ins and connections the series included, such as the Black Widow program, and the strong portrayals of the season's supporting characters. Amy Ratcliffe at Nerdist called the season "a memorable splash" a noted that the lack of filler in the short season lead to "action-packed but not overstuffed" episodes. She praised the "period aspect that's defined so well by music, sets, and costumes" as placing the series "head and shoulders above others", and called the cast "eminently talented". On the other hand, Lowry ultimately found the series "just didn't have legs", saying that after the premiere it "meandered through several episodes that merely seemed to inch the story along, rallying only slightly in the not wholly satisfying conclusion." He felt that outside of Atwell's Carter and D'Arcy's Jarvis that characters were not developed enough, and said that the MCU tie-in with Toby Jones' Arnim Zola made the series seem like "a footnote".

=== Accolades ===
Maureen Ryan of Variety named the show one of the Top 20 Best New Shows of 2015, while Digital Spy ranked it 10th on their Best TV Shows of 2015 list. The A.V. Club named Atwell's performance as one of the "Best Individual Performances" of 2015.

Year	Award	Category	Nominee(s)	Result	Ref.
2015	Hollywood Post Alliance Awards	Outstanding Visual Effects – Television (Under 13 Episodes)	Sheena Duggal, Richard Bluff, Jay Mehta, Chad Taylor, and Cody Gramstad for "Now is Not the End"	Nominated	
2015	Saturn Awards	Best Superhero Adaptation Television Series	Agent Carter	Nominated	
2015	Saturn Awards	Best Actress in a Television Series	Hayley Atwell	Nominated	
2015	Saturn Awards	Best Guest Performance in a Television Series	Dominic Cooper	Nominated	
2016	Visual Effects Society Awards	Outstanding Supporting Visual Effects in a Photoreal Episode	"Now is Not the End"	Nominated	
2016	Make-Up Artists and Hair Stylists Guild Awards	Television and New Media Series – Best Period and/or Character Hair Styling	Agent Carter	Nominated	
