= The Iron Ceiling =

- Agent Carter episode
- Episode no.: Season 1 Episode 5
- Directed by: Peter Leto
- Written by: Jose Molina
- Cinematography by: Gabriel Beristain
- Editing by: Troy Takaki
- Original air date: February 3, 2015
- Running time: 42 minutes

Guest appearances
- Neal McDonough as Timothy "Dum Dum" Dugan; Bridget Regan as Dottie Underwood; Ralph Brown as Dr. Ivchenko; Leonard Roberts as Samuel "Happy Sam" Sawyer; Greg Serano as Rick Ramirez; Eddie Shin as Mike Li; Alex Veadov as Nikola; John Glover as Dooley's informant; Richard Short as Percival "Pinky" Pinkerton; Jared Gertner as the cryptographer; James Austin Kerr as Jonathan "Junior" Juniper

Episode chronology
← Previous "The Blitzkrieg Button"	Next → "A Sin to Err"
- Agent Carter season 1

"The Iron Ceiling" is the fifth episode of the first season of the American television series Agent Carter, inspired by the films Captain America: The First Avenger and Captain America: The Winter Soldier, and the Marvel One-Shot short film also titled Agent Carter. It features the Marvel Comics character Peggy Carter as she goes on a mission to infiltrate a Leviathan military complex with the Howling Commandos, and is set in the Marvel Cinematic Universe (MCU), sharing continuity with the films of the franchise. The episode was written by Jose Molina and directed by Peter Leto.

Hayley Atwell reprises her role as Carter from the film series, and is joined by regular cast members James D'Arcy, Chad Michael Murray, Enver Gjokaj, and Shea Whigham. Neal McDonough guest stars as Dum Dum Dugan, also reprising his role from the films, the leader of the Howling Commandos. Though no other Howling Commandos from the films appear, due to scheduling issues, the episode does introduce new Commandos to the MCU based on existing comics characters. The episode also introduces the origins of the Black Widow program, which plays a significant part in several MCU films.

"The Iron Ceiling" originally aired on ABC on February 3, 2015, and according to Nielsen Media Research, was watched by 4.20 million viewers.

== Plot ==
In 1937 Russia, young girls are trained as merciless assassins to infiltrate America. Each night they are hand cuffed to their beds, a practice that one such girl, "Dottie Underwood", still carries out in 1946 as she lives incognito as the new neighbor of Strategic Scientific Reserve (SSR) agent Peggy Carter. Before Carter leaves for work one morning, Underwood manages to steal the key to her apartment. At the SSR, a high level cryptographer is struggling to decode a message received on a confiscated Russian typewriter with a long-range transmitter. Carter uses her cryptography skills and knowledge of Russian to decode the message herself, and finds map coordinates leading to a Soviet military complex. The message suggests that at this complex Howard Stark, who the SSR have been hunting, will be selling weapons to Leviathan, which Chief Roger Dooley explains is a covert Russian organization. Dooley tasks Agents Jack Thompson, Rick Ramirez, and Mike Li to meet up with a tactical unit and infiltrate the complex to cut off the exchange and arrest Stark for treason. Carter convinces Dooley to allow her to go if she can get the 107th Regiment to assist as their tactical unit, which she does, having fought with them as a friend during World War II.

As they are preparing to leave, Thompson tricks Agent Daniel Sousa into walking in on Carter as she is dressing, creating an awkward and embarrassing moment for them both. Before he leaves her be, Sousa notices two bullet hole wounds on Carter's shoulder. Thompson, Carter, Ramirez, and Li fly to the Russian border where they meet up with several members of the 107th: Dum Dum Dugan, Samuel Sawyer, Junior Juniper, and Pinky Pinkerton, a group that Juniper has nicknamed the "Howling Commandos". On their way to the complex, Carter and Dugan share some bourbon (from her private stash) and reminisce about their war days, fighting alongside their friend (and Carter's great love) Steve Rogers, while also noting that they are most likely headed into a trap. Later, the whole group share war stories, and Carter convinces Thompson to tell them about how he earned the Navy Cross – he had fallen asleep on watch in the Pacific during the War, and had awoken to find Japanese soldiers filling the camp. He killed them all before there were any American casualties, and before some of his comrades had even woken up.

Infiltrating the complex, the group finds the boarding school where Dottie was trained, and discover supposed children's films filled with subliminal messaging. They come across a lone young girl, who Dugan approaches. She at first seems innocent, but reveals that Carter and Dugan were indeed correct about this being a trap when she stabs Dugan in the chest and shoots Juniper dead, before escaping. Looking to escape oncoming Leviathan soldiers, the surviving members of the group carry on into the complex and come across two prisoners: Nikola, a brilliant engineer who has been tasked with creating weapons from Leviathan based on stolen Stark designs; and his psychiatrist, Dr. Ivchenko, who attempts to keep him sane while he does it. The group continues, taking the prisoners with them, but they are all soon cornered by the soldiers, and Agent Li is killed in the firefight. Nikola, tries to negotiate with the survivors, putting Sawyer's life on the line, so his psychiatrist, Dr. Ivchenko, kills him. Dugan blows a hole in the wall for the group to escape through, and Carter holds the enemy off to help the others escape when Thompson freezes up under fire. Back at the plane, the SSR agents and Howling Commandos part ways. Ivchenko decides to go with the agents back to America, willing to help them fight Leviathan in any way he can. On the flight home, Thompson explains why he froze up: fighting now makes him feel guilty because of what really happened in the War – the Japanese soldiers had been carrying a white flag, but Thompson noticed this after he had already killed them all. He buried the flag to hide what he had done, and his comrades believed him to be a hero.

While Carter is gone, Underwood searches her room and comes across photographs of the Stark weapons that the SSR have confiscated. She takes one of the photographs with her, otherwise leaving the room exactly as she found it. Dooley meets with an old friend of his, a journalist who had investigated the Battle of Finow, as Dooley is doing, and too had discovered that the Russian soldiers were massacred before the Germans even arrived, and that Stark had been involved in some sort of cover-up. Dooley learns that Stark had gotten into a fight with a General John McGuinness, but over what is unknown (Dooley approaches Stark's butler Edwin Jarvis for answers, but Jarvis tells him nothing), and McGuinness has recently died while Stark has broken ties with the military. Sousa meanwhile searches through photographs of a woman who has been interfering with the Stark investigation. Though her face is not captured, Sousa can see that she has the same two bullet holes on her shoulder, and realizes that Carter is most likely a traitor.

== Production ==
=== Development ===
In January 2015, Marvel announced that the fifth episode would be titled "The Iron Ceiling", to be written by Jose Molina, with Peter Leto directing.

=== Writing ===
Discussing the fact that Carter gets her first proper field assignment in this episode, executive producer Tara Butters stated "It's a big turning point for her relationship with all of her colleagues, both good and bad, so I think it's a nice moment. [S]he's officially on this mission, which means Dooley let her go on this mission. That shows [where Dooley's head is at after] episode four ... his character has some interesting developments. And Peggy and Thompson's relationship really changes, [as] we learn a lot more about Thompson's backstory. He's been a nice foil for Peggy, and he seems like just a chauvinistic jerk, but we actually learn more about him. Then [with] Sousa, their relationship changes in a very different way. It's a very key episode into how all of their relationships are going to evolve."

=== Casting ===
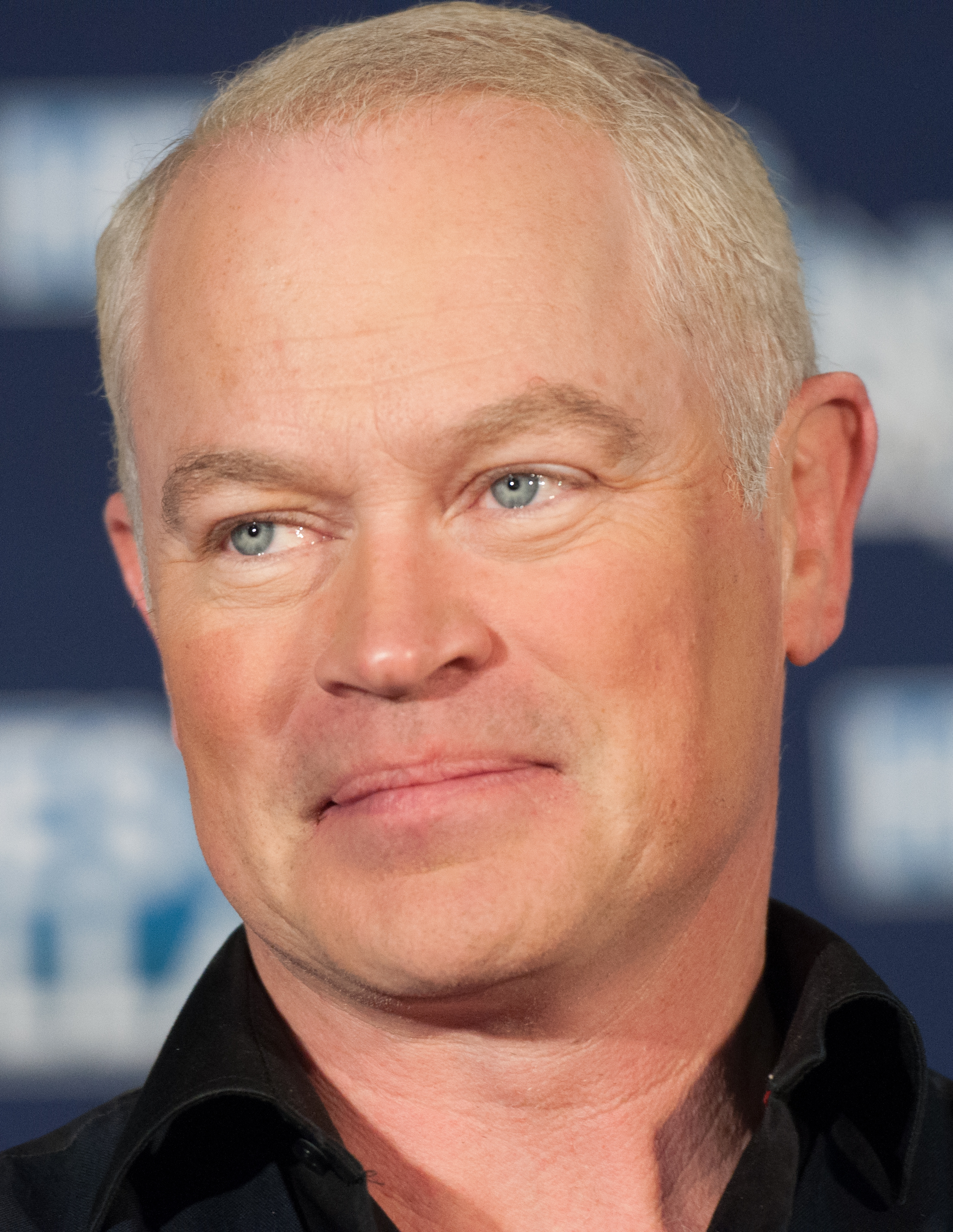
Special guest star Neal McDonough reprises his role from past MCU projects in the episode

In January 2015, Marvel revealed that main cast members Hayley Atwell, James D'Arcy, Chad Michael Murray, Enver Gjokaj, and Shea Whigham would star as Peggy Carter, Edwin Jarvis, Jack Thompson, Daniel Sousa, and Roger Dooley, respectively. It was also revealed that the guest cast for the episode would include Eddie Shin as Agent Mike Li, Greg Serano as Agent Rick Ramirez, Neal McDonough as Dum Dum Dugan, Bridget Regan as Dottie Underwood, Leonard Roberts as Samuel Sawyer, James Austin Kerr as Junior Juniper, Richard Short as Pinky Pinkerton, Ralph Brown as Dr. Ivchenko and Jared Gertner as cryptographer. However, Kerr did not receive guest star credit in the episode. Though they were not officially announced by Marvel, John Glover and Alex Veadov guest star as a friend of Dooley's and the Russian engineer Nikola, respectively. Regan reprises her role from earlier in the series. McDonough reprises his role from Captain America: The First Avenger, Marvel One-Shot Agent Carter, and Agents of S.H.I.E.L.D..

When explaining the introduction of the Howling Commandos to the series, executive producer Tara Butters noted that "when you're doing any production, especially a TV show where things happen very quickly, you never know, as far as actors go, who's going to be available, [or] who's going to be interested in doing a TV show." Ultimately, McDonough was able to reprise his role as Dugan, while the other Commandos (Sawyer, Juniper, and Pinkerton) were all introduced to the MCU in this episode. These "new" Commandos are not original characters, but established Commandos in the comics.

=== Design ===
Series costume designer Giovanna Ottobre-Melton introduced the SSR tactical uniform in this episode, which she intended to have "a pseudo-military meets World War II underground" look. She explained that "The tactical black jacket is a four-pocket field style with epaulets, and is lined in a subtle olive wool plaid. The belt is a thick military black cotton web and metal buckle. The shirts were designed in a classic military winter olive wool with epaulets. The olive wool ties are actual World War II military ties. The cargo pants were constructed in olive Harris tweed wool with beautiful flecks of color. The uniform pants are tucked into dark brown leather boots. For Peggy's boots, I chose boots with leather straps that wrap around the calf – it was a hybrid nod to the World War II military spats and puttee cloth wraps of World War I." For the Howling Commandos, Ottobre-Melton aimed for consistency with the Commandos previously seen in the MCU. Multiple versions of these costumes were created for the episode's action sequences.

Concerning the young girls depicted in the episode, Ottobre-Melton researched boarding schools that specialized in mind control education for children. "For the dormitory scene, I chose plain stark muslin nightgowns for the young girls. In the main classroom, the uniform was created using a classic white short sleeve blouse, accented with a blood red tie, and a black pleated mid-calf skirt. For their physical training scene, I used black wool knitted shorts and white cotton tank tops, accented with a small red branding design. For their teacher, she was dressed in stark grey and black vintage sourced uniforms also using a red scarf accent." The girl encountered by the SSR in the episode "is wearing a black knitted wool pullover with red shoulder epaulets, matched with the uniform black pleated skirt and black stockings."

=== Visual effects ===
Industrial Light & Magic (ILM) and Base FX created the visual effects for the episode. The plane used by the SSR to go on their mission was a real miniature model, with CGI propellers added. Filming was then done with a green screen, and ILM added a matte painting background to complete the shots. For the fighting sequences, every muzzle flare and ricocheting bullet was added during post-production.

=== Marvel Cinematic Universe tie-ins ===
The episode introduces the Red Room and the origins of the Black Widow program, which will eventually produce Natasha Romanoff, who appears in multiple MCU films portrayed by Scarlett Johansson.

== Release ==
"The Iron Ceiling" was first aired in the United States on ABC and in Canada on CTV on February 3, 2015.

The episode was released on Blu-ray and DVD along with the rest of the first season on September 18, 2015, as an Amazon exclusive in the U.S. "The Iron Ceiling" debuted on Hulu on November 29, 2017, after it acquired the exclusive streaming rights to the series, and was made available on Disney+ at launch, on November 12, 2019, along with the rest of the series.

== Reception ==
=== Ratings ===
In the United States the episode received a 1.3/4 percent share among adults between the ages of 18 and 49, meaning that it was seen by 1.3 percent of all households, and 4 percent of all of those watching television at the time of the broadcast. It was watched by 4.20 million viewers. The Canadian broadcast received 1.93 million viewers, making it the fourth most-watched telecast of the night and the twelfth of the week.
