= The Blitzkrieg Button =

- Agent Carter episode
- Episode no.: Season 1 Episode 4
- Directed by: Stephen Cragg
- Written by: Brant Englestein
- Cinematography by: Gabriel Beristain
- Editing by: Chris Peppe
- Original air date: January 27, 2015
- Running time: 41 minutes

Guest appearances
- Dominic Cooper as Howard Stark; Lyndsy Fonseca as Angie Martinelli; Bridget Regan as Dottie Underwood; Meagen Fay as Miriam Fry; Jack Conley as Ernst Mueller; Gregory Sporleder as Otto Mink; John Bishop as Frank

Episode chronology
← Previous "Time and Tide"	Next → "The Iron Ceiling"
- Agent Carter season 1

"The Blitzkrieg Button" is the fourth episode of the first season of the American television series Agent Carter, inspired by the films Captain America: The First Avenger and Captain America: The Winter Soldier, and the Marvel One-Shot short film also titled Agent Carter. It features the Marvel Comics character Peggy Carter as she must hide the fugitive Howard Stark while she retrieves the titular device for him, and is set in the Marvel Cinematic Universe (MCU), sharing continuity with the films of the franchise. The episode was written by Brant Englestein and directed by Stephen Cragg.

Hayley Atwell reprises her role as Carter from the film series, and is joined by regular cast members James D'Arcy, Chad Michael Murray, Enver Gjokaj, and Shea Whigham. Dominic Cooper guest stars as Stark, also reprising his role from the films. The titular device serves as a major connection to the film series, containing the blood of Captain America, the lead character of the aforementioned films.

"The Blitzkrieg Button" originally aired on ABC on January 27, 2015, and according to Nielsen Media Research, was watched by 4.63 million viewers.

== Plot ==
Edwin Jarvis is attempting to pay off smugglers for delivering a shipping container to America for him, when they pull guns on him and demand a higher price. His secret ally, Strategic Scientific Reserve (SSR) agent Peggy Carter takes them out, and they take the container without paying. Inside the container is Jarvis's boss, federal fugitive Howard Stark, whose name Carter and Jarvis are attempting to clear without the knowledge of Carter's colleagues, who are hunting Stark after he apparently sold dangerous weapons to enemies of the United States. Carter and Jarvis had recently discovered the majority of these weapons are still in New York City, but they are now in the possession of the SSR. With the SSR working far harder to catch Stark, now that they believe he is responsible for the death of one of their colleagues, (Note: As depicted in "Time and Tide".) Carter takes Stark back to her (women-only) apartment to hide. He gives her a camera pen of his own invention, which she uses to subtly photograph the weapons for him to study.

SSR chief Roger Dooley, meanwhile, visits a Nazi colonel, Ernst Mueller, in a German prison, who has been sentenced to death the next day. Dooley offers Mueller a cyanide pill in exchange for information on the Battle of Finow, where the Germans supposedly massacred a battalion of Russians. Several of these Russians have been appearing alive in America and are seemingly involved in the Stark investigation. Mueller doesn't know anything about that, but he does explain that the massacre was not by German hand – when he and his soldiers arrived, the Russians had already been torn apart. While Dooley is away, Agent Thompson is in charge, and he is so focused on Stark that he pushes other things aside, like Agent Daniel Sousa, who wants to investigate the docks where the weapons were discovered. Sousa brings in a witness from the docks, a homeless war veteran, and attempts to get information from him, but in the end it is Thompson who gets the information out of him (a man and a woman had been at the docks the night that the weapons were discovered), doing so with contempt for Sousa's apparent need for respect.

Stark, after studying Carter's photographs, points out one weapon that she must get back. Called the Blitzkrieg Button, it can take out the electrical grid for all of New York and beyond. Carter breaks into the SSR lab and swaps the real Blitzkrieg Button for a mock-up. Following her instincts, Carter turns it on, and rather than sending out an electromagnetic pulse, it opens to reveal a vial. Carter returns to her apartment and demands to know what's in the vial, with Stark reluctantly revealing that it is Steve Rogers' blood. Though he tries to convince Carter that he lied to her to protect her feelings, and that he only wanted the Super Soldier blood for medical purposes, she doesn't believe him, and kicks him out. She is also furious at Jarvis for not telling her the truth either, with the regretful Jarvis pointing out to his boss that what they did was wrong.

Carter hides the Blitzkrieg Button in her apartment wall, while the head smuggler, Otto Mink, breaks into the building in an attempt to kill Carter for her part in his not getting paid for smuggling Stark into the country. However, before Mink can get to Carter, he comes across Carter's new neighbor, Dottie Underwood (apparently a small-town ballerina from Iowa), who takes an interest in Mink's automatic pistol, and swiftly kills him for it. Dooley returns from Germany to be met by Thompson, who has discovered that Stark had visited Finow following the massacre, possibly to clean up the mess. Dooley, with thoughts of a conspiracy on his mind, remains at the SSR after all the other agents have left. In his office, the typewriter that belonged to one of the "resurrected" Russians, receives a long-range transmission from Leviathan.

== Production ==
=== Development ===
At the 2014 San Diego Comic-Con, Louis D'Esposito revealed that Captain America: The First Avenger director Joe Johnston was interested in directing episode four, however, the episode was ultimately directed by Stephen Cragg. "The Blitzkrieg Button" was written by Brant Englestein.

=== Casting ===
In January 2015, Marvel revealed that main cast members Hayley Atwell, James D'Arcy, Chad Michael Murray, Enver Gjokaj, and Shea Whigham would star as Peggy Carter, Edwin Jarvis, Jack Thompson, Daniel Sousa, and Roger Dooley, respectively. It was also revealed that the guest cast for the episode would include Lyndsy Fonseca as Angie Martinelli, Alexander Carroll as Agent Yauch, Dominic Cooper as Howard Stark, Bridget Regan as Dottie Underwood, Benita Robledo as Carol, Meagan Holder as Vera, Joanna Strepp as Gloria, John Bishop as Frank, Tim de Zarn as George, Billy Malone as "large" smuggler, Jeremy Timmins as "larger" smuggler, Chad Danshaw as thug, Jack Conley as Colonel Ernst Mueller, Kevin Cotteleer as Alex Doobin, Gregory Sporleder as Otto Mink, Jim Palmer as goon, Tim Garris as hoodlum, Stan Lee as man (next to Stark) and Sarah Schreiber as Lorraine. However, Carroll, Robledo, Holder, Strepp, de Zarn, Malone, Timmins, Danshaw, Cotteleer, Palmer, Garris, Lee, and Schreiber did not receive guest star credit in the episode. Fonseca, Carroll, Cooper, Regan, and Robledo all reprise their roles from earlier in the series. Lee's appearance is just one of many cameo appearances he has made in MCU projects.

=== Design ===
For the "seedy underworld" smugglers depicted in the episode, series costume designer Giovanna Ottobre-Melton "designed a 2-piece utility-style dress so popular in the 1940s and perfect for a mission. The outfit was constructed in teal wool gabardine with a 1/4" chalk pinstripe accented trimmed with crème-colored rayon crepe trim on the collar and a two-tone belt with a brown leather buckle. The buttons were grey mother of pearl shank style." With the return of Stark, now permanently on the run from the government, Ottobre-Melton decided that he wouldn't wear a tie, like most men during the time, and would also go for casual shirts, along with "a custom-made two-tone loafer jacket of grey merino wool and black and grey wool check" and "vintage black gabardine pants." To illustrate the difference between Carter (whose "wardrobe is sophisticated, tailored and [uses] saturated colors") and Underwood, Ottobre-Melton gave the latter "an unstructured softness to her look with bits of lace and floral embroidery ... In this episode, she wore a blouse constructed in crème rayon crepe detailed with pleated detail and lace, for another feminine but modest look."

=== Marvel Cinematic Universe tie-ins ===
The titular Blitzkrieg Button is a device containing a vial of Steve Rogers's blood from Project Rebirth, which has been sought after by the government since Captain America: The First Avenger for its Super Soldier properties.

== Release ==
"The Blitzkrieg Button" was first aired in the on ABC in the United States and CTV in Canada on January 27, 2015.

The episode was released on Blu-ray and DVD along with the rest of the first season on September 18, 2015, as an Amazon exclusive in the U.S. "The Blitzkrieg Button" debuted on Hulu on November 29, 2017, after it acquired the exclusive streaming rights to the series, and was made available on Disney+ at launch, on November 12, 2019, along with the rest of the series.

== Reception ==
=== Ratings ===
In the United States the episode received a 1.3/4 percent share among adults between the ages of 18 and 49, meaning that it was seen by 1.3 percent of all households, and 4 percent of all of those watching television at the time of the broadcast. It was watched by 4.63 million viewers. The Canadian broadcast gained 1.96 million viewers, the third highest for that day and the tenth highest for the week.
