= Valediction (Agent Carter) =

- Agent Carter episode
- Episode no.: Season 1 Episode 8
- Directed by: Christopher Misiano
- Written by: Michele Fazekas; Tara Butters
- Cinematography by: Gabriel Beristain
- Editing by: Troy Takaki
- Original air date: February 24, 2015
- Running time: 42 minutes

Guest appearances
- Dominic Cooper as Howard Stark; Lyndsy Fonseca as Angie Martinelli; Ralph Brown as Johann Fennhoff; Bridget Regan as Dottie Underwood; Glenn Taranto as Prendergast; John Prosky as Walt Cooper

Episode chronology
← Previous "Snafu"	Next → "The Lady in the Lake"
- Agent Carter season 1

"Valediction" is the eighth episode and season finale of the first season of the American television series Agent Carter, inspired by the films Captain America: The First Avenger and Captain America: The Winter Soldier, and the Marvel One-Shot short film also titled Agent Carter. It features the Marvel Comics character Peggy Carter as she fights to stop the Russian antagonists, and is set in the Marvel Cinematic Universe (MCU), sharing continuity with the films of the franchise. The episode was written by Michelle Fazekas and Tara Butters and directed by Christopher Misiano.

Hayley Atwell reprises her role as Carter from the film series, and is joined by regular cast members James D'Arcy, Chad Michael Murray, Enver Gjokaj, and Shea Whigham. Recurring guest stars Ralph Brown and Bridget Regan portray the antagonists, Johann Fennhoff and Dottie Underwood, while Dominic Cooper and Toby Jones reprise their respective roles from the film series as well. The latter appears in a scene that ties the series together with the film Captain America: The Winter Soldier and the series Agents of S.H.I.E.L.D..

"Valediction" originally aired on ABC on February 24, 2015, and according to Nielsen Media Research, was watched by 4.02 million viewers.

== Plot ==
The Strategic Scientific Reserve (SSR) discovers the gas cylinder in the cinema and realize that Ivchenko possibly plans to turn all of New York City on itself. Howard Stark returns and explains that he had developed the gas, named Midnight Oil, to give American soldiers extra stamina during war, but it caused psychosis and led to them killing each other. During World War II, the American military stole Midnight Oil and used it on the Soviets at Finow. Stark believes that Ivchenko – real name Johann Fennhoff – blames Stark for the ensuing massacre, and allows the SSR to use himself as bait to draw Leviathan out. This plan goes awry when Dottie Underwood distracts the agents while Fennhoff kidnaps Stark, and uses hypnosis to convince him to drop the gas on Times Square. At Stark's secret plane hangar, Daniel Sousa apprehends Fennhoff while Carter defeats Underwood (who escapes) and convinces Stark not to drop the gas on the city. Carter later discards Steve Rogers' blood in the East River, finally moving on with her life, while Fennhoff is imprisoned with the scheming Arnim Zola.

== Production ==
=== Development ===
In February 2015, Marvel announced that the eighth episode would be titled "Valediction", to be written by executive producers Michelle Fazekas and Tara Butters, with Christopher Misiano directing.

=== Casting ===
In February 2015, Marvel revealed that main cast members Hayley Atwell, James D'Arcy, Chad Michael Murray, Enver Gjokaj, and Shea Whigham would star as Peggy Carter, Edwin Jarvis, Jack Thompson, Daniel Sousa, and Roger Dooley, respectively. It was also revealed that the guest cast for the episode would include Lyndsy Fonseca as Angie Martinelli, Ralph Brown as Dr. Ivchenko / Johann Fennhoff, Dominic Cooper as Howard Stark, Bridget Regan as Dottie Underwood, Walker Roach as "Captain America" radio actor, Erin Torpey as "Betty Carver" radio actor, Ralph Garman as radio announcer, Dajuan Johnson as Officer Pike, Glenn Taranto as Detective Prendergast, Kevin Ashworth as Agent Fisher, Patrick Smith as Agent Butch Wallace, Matt Raimo as Reporter #1, Ward Roberts as Reporter #2, John Prosky as Senator Walt Cooper, Gerald Webb as Prison Guard Gary Trower, and Christopher Poehls as Ground Crewman. However, Roach, Torpey, Garman, Johnson, Ashworth, Smith, Raimo, Roberts, Webb, and Poehls did not receive guest star credit in the episode. Fonseca, Brown, Cooper, Regan, Roach, Torpey, and Garman reprise their roles from earlier in the series. Additionally, Toby Jones reprises his role of Arnim Zola from the Captain America films.

=== Marvel Cinematic Universe tie-ins ===
The episode explores the origins of the Hydra-led Winter Soldier program and brainwashing from Captain America: The Winter Soldier and Agents of S.H.I.E.L.D., as seen by the end tag when Zola approaches Faustus about mind control.

== Release ==
"Valediction" was first aired in the United States on ABC on February 24, 2015.

The episode was released on Blu-ray and DVD along with the rest of the first season on September 18, 2015, as an Amazon exclusive in the U.S. "Now is Not the End" debuted on Hulu on November 29, 2017, after it acquired the exclusive streaming rights to the series, and was made available on Disney+ at launch, on November 12, 2019, along with the rest of the series.

== Reception ==
=== Ratings ===
In the United States the episode received a 1.3/4 percent share among adults between the ages of 18 and 49, meaning that it was seen by 1.3 percent of all households, and 4 percent of all of those watching television at the time of the broadcast. It was watched by 4.02 million viewers.
