= Snafu (Agent Carter) =

- Agent Carter episode
- Episode no.: Season 1 Episode 7
- Directed by: Vincent Misiano
- Written by: Chris Dingess
- Cinematography by: Gabriel Beristain
- Editing by: Chris Peppe
- Original air date: February 17, 2015
- Running time: 41 minutes

Guest appearances
- Ralph Brown as Johann Fennhoff; Bridget Regan as Dottie Underwood; Lesley Boone as Rose; Sarah Bloom as Loretta; Pawel Szajda as Ovechkin

Episode chronology
← Previous "A Sin to Err"	Next → "Valediction"
- Agent Carter season 1

"Snafu" is the seventh episode of the first season of the American television series Agent Carter, inspired by the films Captain America: The First Avenger and Captain America: The Winter Soldier, and the Marvel One-Shot short film also titled Agent Carter. It features the Marvel Comics character Peggy Carter as she must face coworkers, who she has deceived while working a secret mission, and is set in the Marvel Cinematic Universe (MCU), sharing continuity with the films of the franchise. The episode was written by Chris Dingess and directed by Vincent Misiano.

Hayley Atwell reprises her role as Carter from the film series, and is joined by regular cast members James D'Arcy, Chad Michael Murray, Enver Gjokaj, and Shea Whigham.

"Snafu" originally aired on ABC on February 17, 2015, and according to Nielsen Media Research, was watched by 4.15 million viewers.

== Plot ==
As Peggy Carter is resisting interrogation at the Strategic Scientific Reserve (SSR), Edwin Jarvis appears with a fake signed confession from Howard Stark, promising surrender if Carter is released. Carter sees Ivchenko communicating in Morse code with Dottie Underwood, and reveals the truth about her own investigation to her colleagues to gain their trust. Ivchenko hypnotizes SSR Chief Roger Dooley and has him steal one of Stark's weapons from the SSR's labs: a gas cylinder that Underwood and Ivchenko activate in a crowded cinema before leaving and locking the door behind them. The agents find Dooley wearing a Stark experimental vest given to him by Ivchenko, which Jarvis explains will explode with no way to deactivate it. Dooley jumps out a window moments before the device detonates, killing him but saving the others. The gas in the cinema makes the audience become maniacal and attack each other violently, and when an usher arrives soon after, the entire audience is dead.

== Production ==
=== Development ===
In January 2015, Marvel announced that the seventh episode would be titled "Snafu" and be written by executive producer Chris Dingess, with Vincent Misiano directing.

=== Casting ===
In January 2015, Marvel revealed that main cast members Hayley Atwell, James D'Arcy, Chad Michael Murray, Enver Gjokaj, and Shea Whigham would star as Peggy Carter, Edwin Jarvis, Jack Thompson, Daniel Sousa, and Roger Dooley, respectively. It was also revealed that the guest cast for the episode would include Ralph Brown as Dr. Ivchenko, Bridget Regan as Dottie Underwood, Kevin Cotteleer as Alex Doobin, Lesley Boone as Rose, Travis Johns as Agent Corcoran, Sarah Bloom as Loretta, Lincoln Melcher as Emmett, Madonna Cacciatore as Ovechkin's Mom, Rob Locke as Surgeon, Pawel Szajda as Ovechkin, Lisa Pescherine as Female Salesclerk, Sandra Gimpel as Elderly Woman, Chris Palermo as Middle-Aged Man, Diana Gettinger as Movie Usherette, and Mary Beth Manning as Woman. However, Cotteleer, Johns, Melcher, Cacciatore, Locke, Pescherine, Gimpel, Palermo, Gettinger, and Manning did not receive guest star credit in the episode. Brown, Regan, Cotteleer, and Boone reprise their roles form earlier in the series.

== Release ==
"Snafu" was first aired in the United States on ABC on February 17, 2015.

The episode was released on Blu-ray and DVD along with the rest of the first season on September 18, 2015, as an Amazon exclusive in the U.S. "Snafu" debuted on Hulu on November 29, 2017, after it acquired the exclusive streaming rights to the series, and was made available on Disney+ at launch, on November 12, 2019, along with the rest of the series.

== Reception ==
=== Ratings ===
In the United States, the episode received a 1.4/4 percent share among adults between the ages of 18 and 49, meaning that it was seen by 1.4 percent of all households, and 4 percent of all of those watching television at the time of the broadcast. It was watched by 4.15 million viewers.
