= Bridge and Tunnel (Agent Carter) =

- Agent Carter episode
- Episode no.: Season 1 Episode 2
- Directed by: Joseph V. Russo
- Written by: Eric Pearson
- Cinematography by: Gabriel Beristain
- Editing by: Troy Takaki
- Original air date: January 6, 2015
- Running time: 40 minutes

Guest appearances
- Lyndsy Fonseca as Angie Martinelli; Kyle Bornheimer as Ray Krzeminski; James Frain as Leet Brannis; James Landry Hébert as green suit; Ray Wise as Hugh Jones; Meagen Fay as Miriam Fry; James Urbaniak as Miles Van Ert; Devin Ratray as Sheldon McFee; Don Luce as Mob Boss

Episode chronology
← Previous "Now is Not the End"	Next → "Time and Tide"
- Agent Carter season 1

"Bridge and Tunnel" is the second episode of the first season of the American television series Agent Carter, inspired by the films Captain America: The First Avenger and Captain America: The Winter Soldier, and the Marvel One-Shot short film also titled Agent Carter. It features the Marvel Comics character Peggy Carter as she searches for a truck filled with imploding bombs, and is set in the Marvel Cinematic Universe (MCU), sharing continuity with the films of the franchise. The episode was written by Eric Pearson and directed by Joseph V. Russo.

Hayley Atwell reprises her role as Carter from the film series, and is joined by regular cast members James D'Arcy, Chad Michael Murray, Enver Gjokaj, and Shea Whigham.

"Bridge and Tunnel" originally aired on ABC on January 6, 2015, and according to Nielsen Media Research, was watched by 6.91 million viewers. The episode received praise from critics, especially the performances of Atwell, D'Arcy, and guest star Lyndsy Fonseca, as well as Russo's direction, and the inclusion of the fictional radio drama, the Captain America Adventure Program.

== Plot ==
Strategic Scientific Reserve (SSR) agent Peggy Carter declines an offer from her waitress friend, Angie Martinelli, to become her new neighbor, wishing to protect Angie from the dangers of her double-life as a spy. Searching for a Daisy Clover Dairy truck filled with extremely dangerous molecular nitramene bombs, Carter poses as a health inspector and visits the company, learning the name of the truck's driver, Sheldon McFee. SSR Chief Roger Dooley assigns Agent Ray Krzeminski the task of sifting through the remains of a Roxxon Oil refinery that was imploded by one of the bombs while he and Agents Jack Thompson and Daniel Sousa visit Roxxon CEO Hugh Jones, who notes a rivalry between himself and Howard Stark (the creator of the molecular nitramene formula and a current fugitive from the law) and brings up Stark's work with Vita-radiation. Dooley orders Thompson and Carter screen every Roxxon employee for Vita-radiation, in case the implosion was an inside job.

During the screening process, Carter recognizes scientist Miles Van Ert, who had created the weapons for the mysterious Leet Brannis. Van Ert is arrested and tortured by Thompson until he reveals the name and location of McFee. Carter, trying to clear Stark's name without her colleagues and superiors knowing, reaches McFee with Stark's butler, Edwin Jarvis, first. A man in a green suit, who is hunting Brannis and the weapons, also learns of McFee's location. Carter defeats McFee, and convinces Brannis to go with her and Jarvis, but they are attacked by the man in the green suit. Carter fights the assailant, who mortally wounds Brannis. Carter, Jarvis, and Brannis leap from the truck and allow it, and the man, to drive over a cliff and into a lake. The impact causes the weapons to implode, signaling their location to the arriving SSR agents. Brannis draws a strange symbol in the dirt as a warning to Carter, before dying. Carter and Jarvis then leave before the SSR agents get there. Sousa finds a hotel key that belonged to the man in the green suit, and discovers a woman's footprints, not realizing that they are Carter's.

Later, Jarvis stitches up Carter's wounds, and notes that she doesn't want to get close to anyone. He reminds her that she can't keep the world safe herself, and that even she must learn to rely on her friends sometimes. Carter then reconsiders Martinelli's offer, and moves into the Griffith Hotel, a hostel of sorts for single, proper women. Back at the SSR, Carter is relieved that the other agents have no evidence of what she has been doing, but unbeknownst to her, Krzeminski finds the license plate for Howard Stark's car that she and Jarvis had taken to the Roxxon refinery.

== Production ==
=== Development ===
At the 2014 San Diego Comic-Con, Marvel announced that Anthony and Joe Russo, who directed Captain America: The Winter Soldier, would direct the episode. However, only Joe is credited, under the name Joseph V. Russo. The episode was written by Eric Pearson, who wrote the Marvel One-Shot short film Agent Carter.

=== Casting ===
In December 2014, Marvel revealed that main cast members Hayley Atwell, James D'Arcy, Chad Michael Murray, Enver Gjokaj, and Shea Whigham would star as Peggy Carter, Edwin Jarvis, Jack Thompson, Daniel Sousa, and Roger Dooley, respectively. It was also revealed that the guest cast for the episode would include Lyndsy Fonseca as Angie Martinelli, James Landry Hébert as green suit, Kyle Bornheimer as Ray Krzeminski, James Frain as Leet Brannis, Erin Torpey as Betty Carver (radio actor), Walker Roach as Captain America (radio actor), Greg Bryan as Daisy Clover Forman, Ray Wise as Hugh Jones, Meagen Fay as Miriam Fry, James Urbaniak as Miles Van Ert / White Haired Scientist, Devin Ratray as Sheldon McFee, Ralph Garman as radio announcer, Don Luce as Mob Boss, Jeff Locker as SSR Lab Tech, and Atticus Todd as Winston. However, Torpey, Roach, Bryan, Garman, Locker, and Todd did not receive guest star credit in the episode. Fonseca, Hébert, Bornheimer, Frain, and Urbaniak all reprise their roles from the previous episode.

=== Marvel Cinematic Universe tie-ins ===
The episodes features a reference to the law firm Goodman, Kurtzberg, and Holliway, which is closely associated with the character She-Hulk in the comics; a modern-day version of the law firm, Goodman, Lieber, Kurtzberg & Holliway, appears in the MCU in the Marvel Studios Disney+ series She-Hulk: Attorney at Law (2022).

== Release ==
"Now is Not the End" was first aired in the United States as part of the two-hour series premiere on ABC on January 6, 2015. It was aired alongside the US broadcast in Canada on CTV.

The episode was released on Blu-ray and DVD along with the rest of the first season on September 18, 2015, as an Amazon exclusive in the U.S. "Bridge and Tunnel" debuted on Hulu on November 29, 2017, after it acquired the exclusive streaming rights to the series, and was made available on Disney+ at launch, on November 12, 2019, along with the rest of the series.

== Reception ==
=== Ratings ===
In the United States the episode received a 1.9/6 percent share among adults between the ages of 18 and 49, meaning that it was seen by 1.9 percent of all households, and 6 percent of all of those watching television at the time of the broadcast. It was watched by 6.91 million viewers. The Canadian broadcast gained 2.35 million viewers, the third highest for that day and the seventh highest for the week.

=== Critical response ===
Eric Goldman of IGN gave "Bridge and Tunnel" a score of 8 out of 10, indicating a "Great" episode, praising the chemistry between Atwell's Carter and D'Arcy's Jarvis, Fonseca's performance as Angie Martinelli, and the "fun, retro–Alias vibe", while noting that the male agents "need fleshing out", and feeling that some of Carter's more slapstick humorous moments were "forced" and "out of character". Oliver Sava, writing for The A.V. Club, graded the episode an "A−", feeling that Russo's involvement allowed the episode to "feel more like a direct continuation of the Marvel films" than Agents of S.H.I.E.L.D., calling the visual style "slick", and highlighting his close-quarters action sequences and use of the fictional Captain America Adventure Program. Sava also praised Atwell, saying "She's confident, strong, and sassy, but isn't invulnerable to pain ... Atwell fully embraces the multiple dimensions of her character to give the audience a well-defined lead to latch on to". Alan Sepinwall at HitFix, in reviewing the two-part premiere, stated that "The second hour of the premiere is a bit more convoluted than the first, and features enough flashbacks to events from the first that it may feel clumsy watching them in a row, as scheduled. But on the whole, Atwell is so good, and the show has so much fun with the period setting, that it's a really promising start for Agent Carter".

James Hunt of Den of Geek was positive of the premiere, finding it superior to Agents of S.H.I.E.L.D. and praising the performances of Atwell and D'Arcy. He concluded his review by stating "[Agent Carter]'s got the escapist joy that Marvel movies provide, but it's delivering them weekly instead of once every 6-8 months. If this did indeed grow out of fan support for [Carter], then Marvel is going to find itself with a huge number of very pleased fans on its hands." Amy Ratcliffe at Nerdist praised Atwell and Carter's characterization, the intelligence of the "oblivious" male SSR agents, D'Arcy, and Jarvis' relationship with Carter. She called the Captain America Adventure Program "awful-but-wonderful-for-the-plot", and also praised the depiction of the period setting, specifically the color palette, the sets, the costumes, and the dialogue. Britt Hayes, reviewing for ScreenCrush, felt that the episode "feels a little more loose" than the first "as the series settles into its rhythm without feeling the need to explain why it exists." She was positive of the attention given to the supporting cast and characters, especially Whigham as Dooley and Fonseca as Martinelli.
