= Now is Not the End =

- Agent Carter episode
- Episode no.: Season 1 Episode 1
- Directed by: Louis D'Esposito
- Written by: Christopher Markus; Stephen McFeely
- Cinematography by: Gabriel Beristain
- Editing by: Chris Peppe
- Original air date: January 6, 2015
- Running time: 42 minutes

Guest appearances
- Dominic Cooper as Howard Stark; Lyndsy Fonseca as Angie Martinelli; Kyle Bornheimer as Ray Krzeminski; James Frain as Leet Brannis; James Landry Hébert as green suit; Ashley Hinshaw as Colleen O'Brien; James Urbaniak as Miles Van Ert; Andre Royo as Spider Raymond; Lesley Boone as Rose; Bill Kalmenson as Senator Webster; Costa Ronin as Anton Vanko

Episode chronology
← Previous —	Next → "Bridge and Tunnel"
- Agent Carter season 1

"Now is Not the End" is the first episode of the first season of the American television series Agent Carter. It features the Marvel Comics character Peggy Carter as she goes undercover to try clear the name of her friend Howard Stark. The episode is set in the Marvel Cinematic Universe (MCU) and acknowledges the franchise's films. It was written by series creators Christopher Markus and Stephen McFeely, and directed by Louis D'Esposito who previously directed the Marvel One-Shots short film that inspired the series.

Hayley Atwell reprises her role as Carter from the film series, starring alongside James D'Arcy, Chad Michael Murray, Enver Gjokaj, and Shea Whigham. Markus and McFeely, the writers of several MCU films, had written the episode by January 2014. It was officially ordered that May. The episode contains several film connections: Dominic Cooper reprises his film role as Stark, Costa Ronin guest stars as the younger version of film character Anton Vanko, and archive footage from Captain America: The First Avenger (2011) is used. The costume and visual effects teams focused on establishing an authentic 1940s New York setting for the episode.

"Now is Not the End" originally aired on ABC on January 6, 2015, and was watched by 10.16 million viewers within a week. The episode was praised by critics for its period setting, relative independence from the rest of the MCU, and especially for the performances of Atwell and D'Arcy. Many critics stated that the episode was superior to ABC's previous Marvel television series Agents of S.H.I.E.L.D. "Now is Not the End" was nominated for Outstanding Supporting Visual Effects in a Photoreal Episode at the 14th Visual Effects Society Awards, and for Outstanding Visual Effects – Television (Under 13 Episodes) at the 2015 Hollywood Post Alliance Awards.

== Plot ==
In 1946 New York City, a year after the apparent death of the love of her life, Steve Rogers, (Note: As depicted in Captain America: The First Avenger.) Strategic Scientific Reserve (SSR) agent Peggy Carter is stuck doing administrative work while her male colleagues carry out field assignments. The latest case at the SSR is the hunt for Howard Stark, who has been branded a traitor for selling weapons-grade technology to U.S. enemies, and is now in hiding. Stark, a friend of Carter's from World War II, covertly meets with Carter to ask her help in clearing his name. He believes that his formula for molecular nitramene, which he says has been stolen, is about to be sold somewhere in New York.

At the SSR, Carter learns from the crippled war veteran agent Daniel Sousa that the chauvinistic and promotion-seeking Agent Jack Thompson is following a lead on club owner Spider Raymond, who is looking to fence Stark's inventions. Raymond indeed sells the formula to the silent Leet Brannis. Infiltrating the club in disguise, Carter breaks into Raymond's safe and discovers that the formula has already been turned into a weapon. By the time Thompson gets there, Raymond is dead, killed by a man in a green suit, who follows Carter back to her apartment and kills her roommate. Carter pushes him out a window, and notices that he has a scar on his neck where his voice box once was. After attempting to comfort her, Stark's butler Edwin Jarvis takes Carter to see Dr. Anton Vanko at Stark Industries, who deduces that the weapon was created at a Roxxon Oil refinery.

Carter finds Brannis mass-producing the nitramine weapons at the refinery. Brannis also has a scar where his voice box once was, and by holding an electronic device to it is able to warn Carter that "Leviathan" is coming. Brannis drops one of the bombs, giving Carter 30 seconds to escape, and the subsequent implosion destroys the building. Carter and Jarvis get away safely, as does Brannis with a truck full of nitramene bombs. Later, Jarvis calls Stark to assure him that Carter is an excellent choice.

== Production ==
=== Development ===
On May 8, 2014, ABC officially ordered a series starring Hayley Atwell as Peggy Carter, inspired by the Marvel Cinematic Universe films Captain America: The First Avenger (2011) and Captain America: The Winter Soldier (2014), as well as the Marvel One-Shots short film Agent Carter (2013). Christopher Markus and Stephen McFeely, writers of the Captain America films, had written a script for the first episode by January of that year, and at the 2014 San Diego Comic-Con Marvel revealed that Louis D'Esposito, who directed the One-Shot short film, would direct the episode. The title of the premiere episode was revealed to be "Now is Not the End" in December 2014.

=== Casting ===
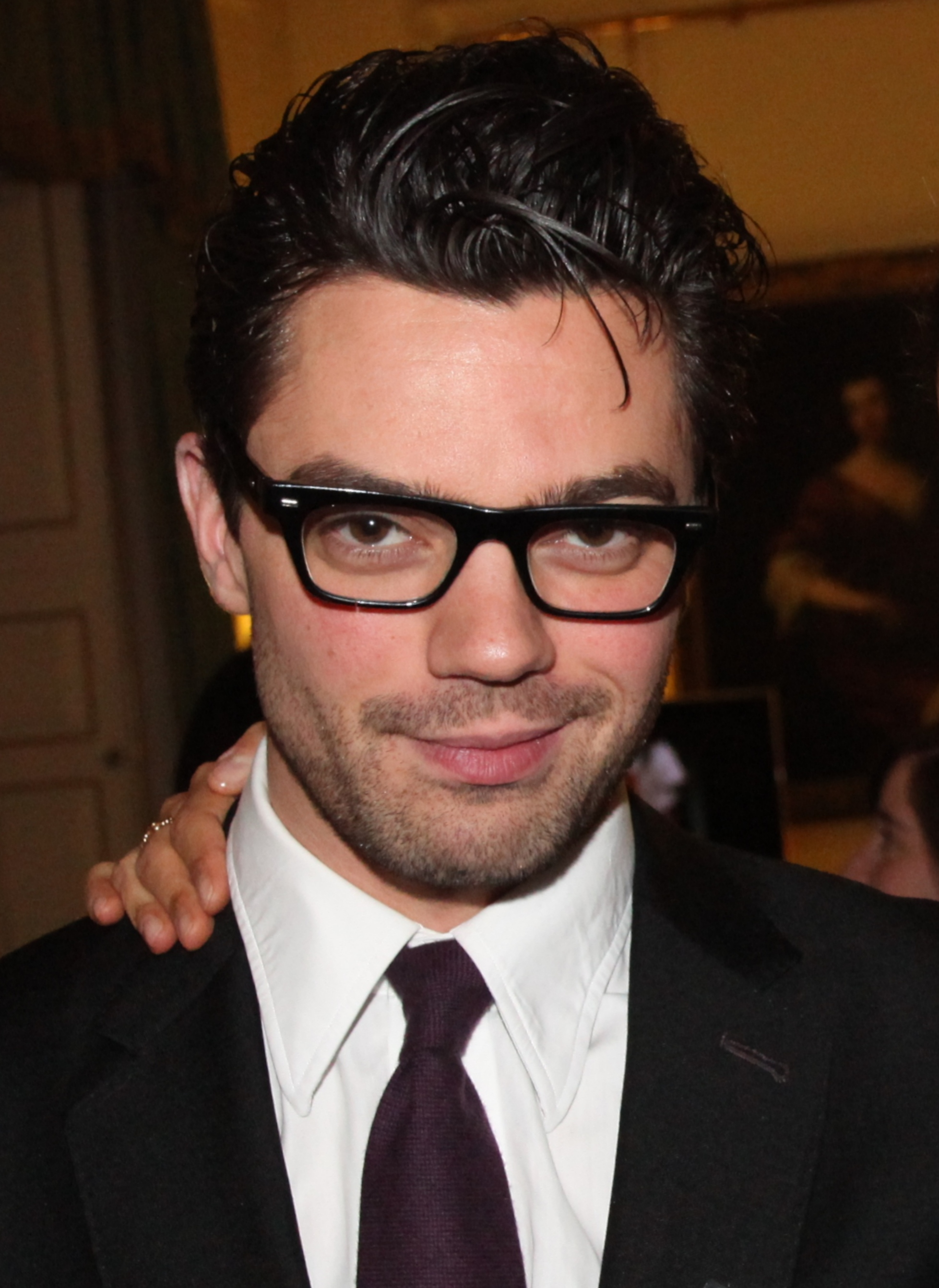
Special guest star Dominic Cooper reprises his role of Howard Stark from other MCU projects.

In December 2014, Marvel confirmed that the episode would star main cast members Hayley Atwell as Peggy Carter, James D'Arcy as Edwin Jarvis, Chad Michael Murray as Jack Thompson, Enver Gjokaj as Daniel Sousa, and Shea Whigham as Roger Dooley.

The guest cast for the episode was also revealed to include Lyndsy Fonseca as Angie Martinelli, Dominic Cooper as Howard Stark, Andre Royo as Spider Raymond, James Landry Hébert as green suit, Kyle Bornheimer as Ray Krzeminski, Ashley Hinshaw as Colleen O'Brien, Carrick O'Quinn as tall bouncer, James Frain as Leet Brannis, Tim True as tipsy guy, Johnny Marques as bartender, Jeffrey David Anderson as short bouncer, James Urbaniak as scientist, Bill Kalmenson as Senator Webster, Lesley Boone as Rose, Costa Ronin as Anton Vanko, and Kevin Heffernan as Madison Avenue guy.

Cooper reprises his role from The First Avenger and the Agent Carter short. Anton Vanko was previously portrayed by Yevgeni Lazarev in Iron Man 2 (2010); Ronin plays a younger version of the character. Gjokaj previously had a minor role in The Avengers (2012). Additionally, Chris Evans appears as Steve Rogers / Captain America via archive footage from The First Avenger.

=== Design ===
When Carter goes undercover in the episode, she wears a dress inspired by the evening dresses of the 1930s and 40s, which the script described as a "Veronica Lake look". For the character of Colleen O'Brien, series costume designer Giovanna Ottobre-Melton saw her as a "hard working girl making just enough to get by. The war term 'Mend and Make Do' really applies to her." The man in the green suit was a "tricky balance" for Ottobre-Melton, who needed a green that was not over the top but still made a "powerful statement". The final design was inspired by a real 1940s green double breasted suit that she found.

=== Visual effects ===
Industrial Light & Magic (ILM) and Base FX created the visual effects for the episode, with work by ILM including the creation of backdrops for the series, with matte paintings used, to depict 1940s New York.

=== Marvel Cinematic Universe tie-ins ===
Archive footage from Captain America: The First Avenger, including the apparent death of Steve Rogers from the end of that film, is used throughout the episode, and the MacGuffin of the episode, molecular nitramene, is based on the Vita-Rays that were used to transform Steve Rogers into Captain America in the film. The Vita-Ray detector that Carter uses in the episode belonged to Dr. Abraham Erskine, who was portrayed by Stanley Tucci in The First Avenger. The Oil Refinery featured at the climax of the episode belongs to Roxxon Oil, a company that has appeared throughout the MCU.

== Release ==
"Now is Not the End" was first aired in the United States on ABC on January 6, 2015, as the first half of a two-part series premiere. It was aired alongside the U.S. broadcast in Canada on CTV. It aired in New Zealand on February 11, 2015, on TV2.

The episode was released on Blu-ray and DVD along with the rest of the first season on September 18, 2015, as an Amazon exclusive in the U.S. "Now is Not the End" debuted on Hulu on November 29, 2017, after it acquired the exclusive streaming rights to the series, and was made available on Disney+ at launch, on November 12, 2019, along with the rest of the series.

== Reception ==
=== Ratings ===
In the U.S. the episode received a 1.9/6 percent share among adults between the ages of 18 and 49, meaning it was seen by 1.9 percent of all households and 6 percent of all those watching television at the time of the broadcast. It was watched by 6.91 million viewers. The Canadian broadcast had 2.35 million viewers, the third highest for that day and the seventh highest for the week. Within a week the episode had been watched by 10.16 million U.S. viewers, higher than the season average of 7.61 million.

=== Critical response ===
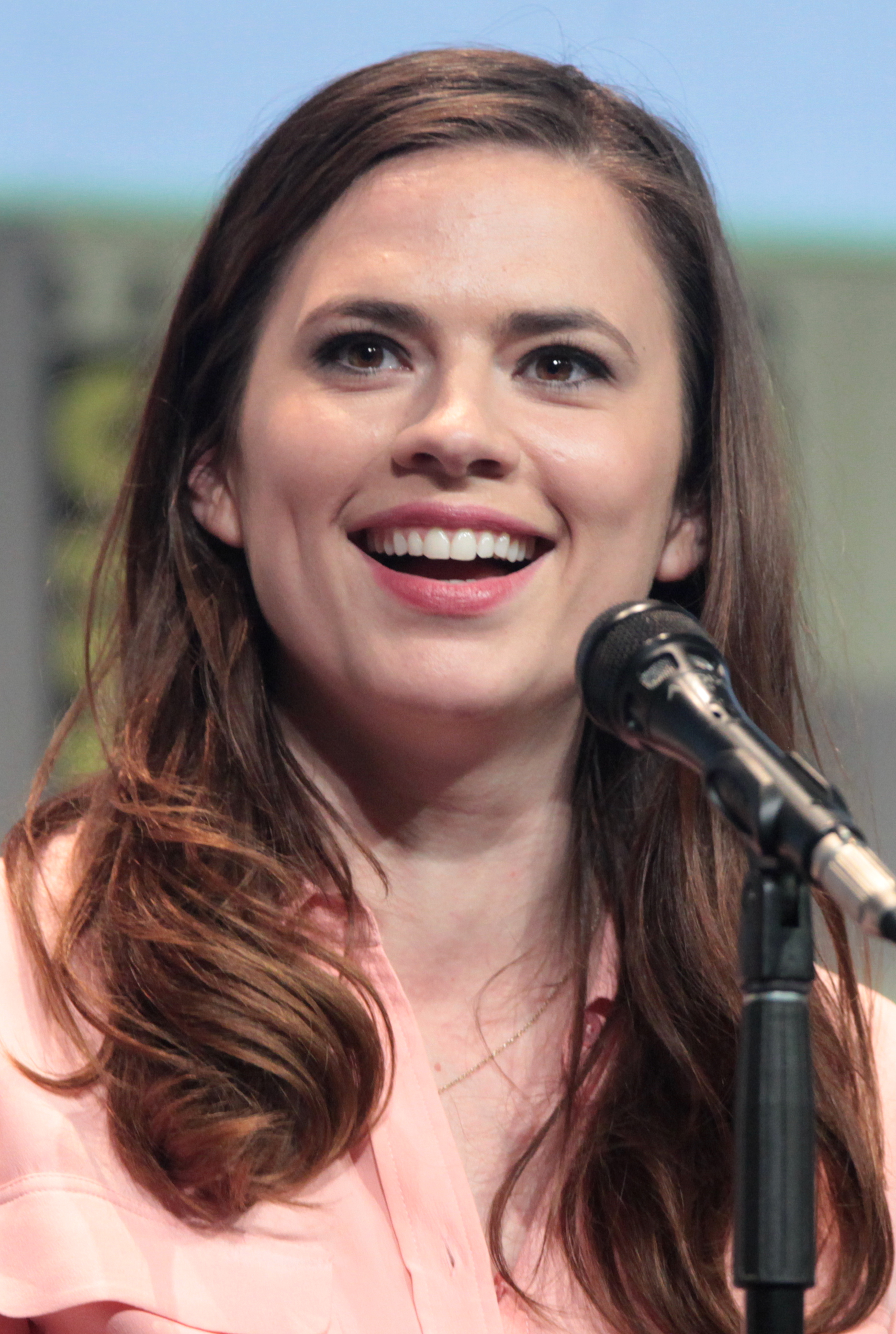
Hayley Atwell received praise for her performance as Peggy Carter

Eric Goldman of IGN gave "Now is Not the End" a score of 8 out of 10, indicating a "Great" episode, and praised Atwell's performance as Carter as well as her dynamic with D'Arcy's Jarvis. Goldman felt that the period setting was used well, despite the episode feeling "like a TV show compared to the Marvel movies (being a TV show and all)". He was happy that the series was telling its own story rather than attempting to be an important part of the overarching MCU storyline. Goldman did feel that Carter needed a more specific villain to fight, and hoped that would change quickly given the short episode count for the season. Alan Sepinwall at HitFix felt the series had learned from the mistakes of Agents of S.H.I.E.L.D., and stood as its own entity. He praised Atwell's performance, the visual/period style, and D'Arcy as Jarvis, but he felt that Carter's sexist colleagues were cartoonish, saying "not that sexism didn't exist in the era, but that it's a tough thing to dramatize from a modern perspective without feeling winky and smug. It's a dance many period dramas have to do, not always successfully, and while it would be foolish to pretend a woman like Peggy wouldn't have had to deal with these kinds of idiots all the time, Agent Carter is at its liveliest when the three stooges are nowhere to be seen".

James Hunt with Den of Geek stated called the series "quite genuinely, brilliant. Everything that went wrong with Agents Of SHIELD goes right in Agent Carter. It looks fantastic, doing its level best to recreate 1940s New York on what is probably quite a low budget, and succeeding. It ties into the MCU in ways that feel natural ...There isn't a weak performance in the cast, and even the writing is strong, with compelling plots giving space to subplots which chug along at a nice pace." He was positive about Atwell's performance, but praised D'Arcy as "the breakout star of the cast". Amy Ratcliffe of Nerdist concluded her review of the episode saying "Overall, Agent Carter didn't open the door and tiptoe in; it busted through and took charge. Atwell is a magnetic force of nature and seems completely at home in the role, and she's complemented by D'Arcy and Gjokaj." She also felt that lessons had been learned from Agents of S.H.I.E.L.D., and thought that all the work put into creating the period setting had paid off. Britt Hayes, reviewing for ScreenCrush, felt the episode "fumbles a little, as most series do when they're introducing us to a new world", but was positive of Atwell, D'Arcy, and the cinematography. Hayes' major issue was the score, which she felt "lingers a little too long and feels slightly tone deaf—it definitely cheapens the proceedings".

Noel Murray, writing for The A.V. Club, graded the two-part premiere an "A−", praising it as "retro-cool pulp thrills in fabulous outfits. Think The Rocketeer or Raiders of the Lost Ark, but with a dame instead of a dude." Murray stated that the series' "greatest asset is Atwell, who takes a character that Marvel Comics has never really done much with before and makes it her own." Oliver Sava, also from The A.V. Club, graded "Now is Not the End" an "A−" as well, calling the series a gamble, but deciding that the first episode "surpasses expectations with its dynamic direction and fight choreography, clever writing, and hugely charismatic lead." Other than Atwell's performance, which he called "confident, strong, and sassy", Sava was also positive about the writers and director, and overall found the first two episodes of the series to be superior to Agents of S.H.I.E.L.D.

=== Accolades ===
"Now is Not the End" was nominated for Outstanding Supporting Visual Effects in a Photoreal Episode at the 14th Visual Effects Society Awards losing to the Vikings episode "To The Gates!", and for Outstanding Visual Effects – Television (Under 13 Episodes) at the 2015 Hollywood Post Alliance Awards, losing to the Game of Thrones episode "The Dance of Dragons".
