= Pawel Szajda =

American actor (born 1982)

- Born: Pawel B. Szajda; January 13, 1982 (age 44); Farmington, Connecticut, U.S.
- Occupation: Actor
- Years active: 2003–present
- Spouse: Marina Polo (m. 2019)

Pawel B. Szajda (Polish: Paweł Szajda [ˈpavɛw ˈʂajda]; born January 13, 1982) is an American screen and stage actor. He is best known for his roles in Under the Tuscan Sun, Generation Kill, Tatarak, and as Soviet cosmonaut Alexei Poletov in the third season of the Apple TV+ original science fiction space drama series For All Mankind.

== Early life and education ==
Szajda was born and raised in Farmington, Connecticut.

Szajda's maternal great-grandfather left Poland for Chicago in 1912, two years prior to the outbreak of World War I. He married Szajda's Polish grandmother, had children, and, after the war ended, moved to Poland. In 1964, the family moved back to the United States, which is where Szajda's mother graduated from college and then returned with the family to Poland. In Poland, she met Szajda's father, and they had Szajda's older sister, Barbara, and two older brothers, Marcin and Adam. Following the introduction of martial law in Poland in 1981, Szajda's family relocated to the United States. Szajda also has a younger brother, Phil.

Growing up in the United States, his family spoke Polish and sent Pawel and his siblings to Polish-language school every Saturday. "I thought my parents' decision to send me to Polish-language classes every Saturday ruined my childhood, but it's actually been my stepping stone into acting," Szajda said. He was a Polish Boy Scout.

Szajda graduated from Farmington High School in 1999. During his time at the school he participated in track and field, was a state champion wrestler, played trumpet and was the marching band drum major. He also played the title role in the play The Foreigner by Larry Shue.

== Career ==
Szajda's acting career started with a TV commercial for the 1996 Olympics.

In 2002, he won a role in Under the Tuscan Sun. Director Audrey Wells had wanted to use an actor from Poland, but due to visa issues, she was forced to look elsewhere and chose Szajda. Szajda plays a Polish immigrant handyman named Pawel, disapproved of by his Italian girlfriend's father.

After filming completed on Under the Tuscan Sun, Szajda returned from Italy to finish his studies in English literature and economics. He spent a year at Bridgewater State College before moving to New York City to attend Fordham University at the Lincoln Center campus.

He continued to act on screen and on stage while pursuing his education. He appeared in an episode of Hope & Faith (2004), Venom (2005), The Infliction of Cruelty (2006), and Death Without Consent (2007).

Szajda appeared in the 2008 HBO mini-series Generation Kill (2008) as Corporal Walt Hasser.

In the 2009 movie, Tatarak (Sweet Rush in English) by Academy Award winner Andrzej Wajda, Szajda made his Polish film debut in the leading role of Boguś. The film was a competitor in the 59th Berlin International Film Festival.

He has played in The Players Theater in New York City and Makor/Steinhardt Center at the 14th Street Y in Manhattan.

In 2022, Szajda had a recurring role in the third season of the Apple TV+ original science fiction space drama series For All Mankind as Soviet cosmonaut Alexei Poletov, a member of Roscosmos' Mars-94 mission and one of the first humans to land on Mars.

He is represented by The Glick Agency.

== Personal life ==
Szajda's interests include traveling, photography, drawing, and playing the trumpet. "When we were filming Tatarak in Grudziądz, I took some wonderful photos of the sky—it’s amazing there! Maybe that’s why I’d like to act more in Poland—to be able to visit the country."

In 2019, he married his long time girlfriend Marina Polo in Italy.

== Filmography ==
- 1996: Furby Commercial
- 1996: Pablow, An Olympic commercial in the United States
- 2003: Under the Tuscan Sun - Pawel
- 2004: Hope & Faith (TV series) - College Guy
- 2005: Venom - Ricky
- 2007: Death Without Consent - Sean
- 2008: Generation Kill (TV mini-series) - Cpl. Walt Hasser
- 2009: Tatarak (Sweet Rush [English title]) - Bogus / Marta's lover
- 2011: Blue Bloods (TV series) - Sergei Sokoloff
- 2011: Wygrany (The Winner) - Oliver Linovsky
- 2012: 3 Days of Normal - Trent Callender
- 2015: Agent Carter (Episode: "Snafu") - Ovechkin
- 2016: Our Kind of Traitor - Blue Eyed Killer
- 2016: Imperium - Vince Sargent
- 2018: Dynasty (Episode: "Twenty-Three Skidoo") - Nikolai Dimitrov
- 2019: The Haunting of Sharon Tate - Wojciech Frykowski
- 2019: Above the Shadows - Marjus
- 2022: For All Mankind (TV series) - Alexei Poletov

== Stage work ==
- 1990s: Charlie Baker, The Foreigner by Larry Shue, at Farmington High School
- 2006: The Infliction of Cruelty by Sean McManus and Andrew Unterberg at the 10th Annual New York International Fringe Festival, August 18–26
