= Spokane (film) =

- Directed by: Larry Kennar
- Written by: Larry Kennar
- Starring: Kyle Bornheimer; Jason Waters
- Release date: January 16, 2004 (Sundance)
- Running time: 29 minutes

Spokane is a 2004 short film written and directed by Larry Kennar. The cast included Kyle Bornheimer and Jason Waters. It premiered at the 2004 Sundance Film Festival and was awarded an honorable mention in the international shorts category.

== Premise ==
A straight guy meets an openly gay man at a wedding and finds himself the willing subject of a seduction that turns into an awkward night in a motel room.
