= Kyle Bornheimer =

American actor and comedian

- Born: September 10, 1975 (age 51)
- Occupations: Actor; comedian
- Years active: 2004–present
- Spouse: Shannon Ryan
- Children: 2

Kyle Bornheimer (born September 10, 1975) is an American actor and comedian. He is known for his roles on the sitcoms Worst Week, Brooklyn Nine-Nine, Casual, and Playing House.

== Life and career ==
Bornheimer attended St. Monica Grade School and Marian High School, graduating in 1994. Bornheimer is a founding member of The Curtainbox Theatre Company.

With a string of national commercials, Bornheimer established an "always on TV" reputation with 30-second spots for such national accounts as Geico, Staples, Coors Light, Imodium, Stanley and T-Mobile.

He landed the lead of Sam Briggs on the sitcom Worst Week. He starred with Alyssa Milano on the TV sitcom Romantically Challenged. The series premiered on ABC on April 19, 2010, but ABC officially canceled the series on May 16, 2010.

In Breaking Bad, he played Ken, an obnoxious stockbroker who gets his car blown up by Walter White in the Season 1 episode "Cancer Man", and later reprised his role as the character in the prequel Better Call Saul, as the victim of a prank pulled by Jimmy McGill and Kim Wexler in the Season 2 episode "Switch". Bornheimer has also been featured in episodes of Better Off Ted, The Office, Brooklyn Nine-Nine, and Party Down. In 2011, Bornheimer starred in the NBC sitcom Perfect Couples opposite Olivia Munn, David Walton, and Hayes MacArthur and in the ABC sitcom Family Tools with J.K. Simmons and Leah Remini.

In 2016, Bornheimer appeared on the CBS sitcom Angel from Hell. His feature film credits include She's Out of My League, You Again, and Bachelorette. He also made two appearances in Judd Apatow's Netflix series Love.

== Filmography ==
=== Films ===
Year	Title	Role	Notes
2004	Spokane	James	
2004	Devils are Dreaming	Arden	
2005	An Alright Start	Doug	
2007	Blades of Glory	Rink PA Nationals	
2010	For Christ's Sake	Tony	
2010	She's Out of My League	Dylan Kettner	
2010	You Again	Tim	
2012	Bachelorette	Joe	
2013	The Big Wedding	Andrew	
2014	Veronica Mars	Hedge Fund Guy	
2015	The D Train	Randy	
2015	The Last Time You Had Fun	Clark	
2016	Me Him Her	Steve	
2016	Rules Don't Apply	Concerned Orderly	
2017	Little Evil	Victor	
2019	Marriage Story	Ted	
2020	Timmy Failure: Mistakes Were Made	Crispin Flavius	
2020	Onward	Wilden Lightfoot / Narrator (voice)	
2020	The Lovebirds	Brett	

=== Television ===
Year	Title	Role	Notes
2004	Monk	Uniform Cop	Episode: "Mr. Monk and the Kid"
2004	The O.C.	Norman	Episode: "The Risky Business"
2005	How I Met Your Mother	Austin	Episode: "Okay Awesome"
2005	Medium	Waiter	Episode: "Too Close to Call"
2006	Will & Grace	Waiter	Episode: "Cop to It"
2006	Lovespring International	Derek Gardner	Episode: "Burke Makes a Friend"
2006	Weeds	Chuck	Episode: "Crush Girl Love Panic"
2006	The Unit	Officer Jones	Episode: "Off the Meter"
2007	The Office	Ad Company Representative	Episode: "Local Ad"
2008	Girlfriends	Jason	Episode: "What's Black-a-Lackin'?"
2008–09	Worst Week	Sam Briggs	Main role; 16 episodes
2008	Breaking Bad	Ken	Episode: "Cancer Man"
2008	Jericho	Chris Calley	Episode: "Condor"
2009	Party Down	Mark Defino	Episode: "James Rolf High School Twentieth Reunion"
2010	Better Off Ted	Pete	Episode: "The Long and Winding High Road"
2010	Chuck	Hunter Perry	Episode: "Chuck Versus the Final Exam"
2010	Royal Pains	Spencer Fisher	Episode: "Spasticity"
2010	Romantically Challenged	Perry Gill	Main role; 6 episodes
2010–11	Perfect Couples	Dave	Main role; 11 episodes
2012	Bent	Dan	Episode: "Tile Date"
2013	Arrested Development	Shannon Ryan	Episode: "A New Start"
2013	Family Tools	Jack Shea	Main role; 10 episodes
2014	Those Who Kill	Paul Cavallo	5 episodes
2014–21	Brooklyn Nine-Nine	Sgt. Teddy Wells Ramos	7 episodes
2014	Workaholics	Girthquake	Episode: "Fry Guys"
2014	Justified	Jack Anderson	Episode: "Whistle Past the Graveyard"
2015	Agent Carter	Ray Krzeminski	Episodes: "Now is Not the End", "Bridge and Tunnel", "Time and Tide"
2015–16	Comedy Bang! Bang!	Pat Dantrick	4 episodes
2015	Playing House	Dan	5 episodes
2016	Angel from Hell	Brad	Main role; 13 episodes
2016	Better Call Saul	Ken	Episode: "Switch"
2016	The Mindy Project	J.J.	Episode: "Mindy Lahiri is DTF"
2016–17	Casual	Jack Briggs	14 episodes
2016	Westworld	Clarence	Episode: "The Original"
2016	American Housewife	Bruce	Episode: "Power Couple"
2017	Angie Tribeca	Scott	Episode: "If You See Something, Solve Something"
2017	Modern Family	Scotty	Episode: "Lake Life"
2017	Will & Grace	Lenny	Episode: "11 Years Later"
2018	Love	Ken Cruikshank	2 episodes
2018	Speechless	Eddie	Episode: "A-C-- ACTION"
2018	Drunk History	Ghost Army Soldier	Episode: "World War II"
2019	Heartstrings	Landon	Episode: "These Old Bones"
2020–2022	Avenue 5	Doug	Recurring role
2020	Amazing Stories	Michael Harris	Episode: "Dynoman and the Volt!!"
2020	Broke	Barry	4 episodes
2022	High School	Patrick	7 episodes
2025	St. Denis Medical	Tim	Recurring
2025	Good American Family	Dr. Wachter	Episode: "Jump the Jitters out"
