= HPA Award for Outstanding Visual Effects – Television (Under 13 Episodes) =

Annual award given by the Hollywood Professional Association

The Hollywood Professional Association Award for Outstanding Visual Effects - Television (Under 13 Episodes) is an annual award given by the Hollywood Professional Association (HPA) to post production workers in the film and television industry, in this case visual effects artists. It was first awarded in 2006, and outside of 2008 and 2010, has been presented every year since. From 2006 to 2012, the category was titled HPA Award for Outstanding Compositing - Television. In 2018, the category started separating series that had more than 13 episodes a season, and those that had less than 13.

== Winners and nominees ==
- † – indicates the winner of the Primetime Emmy Award for Outstanding Special Visual Effects
- ‡ – indicates a nominee for the Primetime Emmy Award for Outstanding Special Visual Effects
- †† – indicates the winner of the Primetime Emmy Award for Outstanding Special Visual Effects in a Supporting Role
- ‡‡ – indicates a nominee for the Primetime Emmy Award for Outstanding Special Visual Effects in a Supporting Role

=== 2000s ===
Outstanding Compositing - Television

Year	Program	Episode(s)	Nominees	Network
2006	Nightmares & Dreamscapes: From the Stories of Stephen King	"Battleground" †	Eric Grenaudier, Megan Omi, Valeri Pfahning, Diego Galtieri	TNT
2006	Deadwood	"Tell Your God to Ready for Blood"	Tim Jacobsen, David Altenau, Jason Fotter, Bob Minshall	HBO
2006	House	"Euphoria (Part 1)"	Elan Soltes, Kent Feeler, Matt von Brock, Nick Damico	Fox
2007	The Company	"Part 2" ‡	Vít Komrzý, Viktor Muller, Miro Gal, Jiri Stamfest	TNT
2007	Grey's Anatomy	"Walk on Water" ‡	Valeri Pfahning, Christopher D. Martin, Diego Galtieri, Eric Grenaudier	ABC
2007	The Unit	"Johnny B. Good"	Bob Minshall, Matt von Brock, Changsoo Eun, Dan Lopez	CBS
2009	Krupp: A Family Between War and Peace		Thomas Tannenberger, Olcun Tan, Shane Cook, Josiah Holmes Howison	ZDF
2009	House	"House Divided"	Elan Soltes, Dan Lopez, Jeremy Jozwik, Changsoo Eun	Fox

=== 2010s ===
Year	Program	Episode(s)	Nominees	Network
2011	Boardwalk Empire	"Family Limitation"	Paul Graff, Brian Sales, Merysa Nichols, Jesse Siglow	HBO
2011	Boardwalk Empire	"Boardwalk Empire" †	J. John Corbett, Jun Zhang, Matthew Conner	HBO
2011	Castle	"Poof! You're Dead"	Brian McIntyre, Gevork Babityan, Jon Howard	ABC
2011	Necessary Roughness	"Pilot"	Mark Intravartolo, Mitch Gates, Charley Carlat, Sarah McGrail	USA
2011	No Ordinary Family	"No Ordinary Double Standard"	Jason Fotter, Matt von Brock, Aldo Ruggiero, Eric Hayden	ABC
2012	NCIS	"Rekindled"	Bob Minshall, Mark Intravartolo, Jeremy Jozwik, Carrie L. Smith (visual effects artists)	CBS
2012	Castle	"Head Case"	Mitch Gates (cg supervisor); Rick Ramirez, Jeremy Jozwik, Brian McIntyre (visual effects artists)	ABC
2012	Great Expectations	"Part 3"	Henry Badgett (visual effects supervisor); Stuart Bullen, Markus Kuha, Simon Rowe (digital compositors)	PBS
2012	The River	"No Ordinary Double Standard"	Stephan Szpak-Fleet (visual effects supervisor), Mitch Gates (cg supervisor), Charley Carlat (visual effects artist), Sarah McGrail (visual effects producer)	ABC

Outstanding Visual Effects - Television

Year	Program	Episode(s)	Nominees	Network
2013	Game of Thrones	"Valar Dohaeris" †	Joe Bauer, Doug Campbell, Jörn Großhans (visual effects supervisors); Sven Martin (animation supervisor); Jabbar Raisani (compositing supervisor)	HBO
2013	Banshee	"Pilot" ††	Armen V. Kevorkian (visual effects supervisor); Mike Oakley (lead visual effects artist); Jeremy Jozwik, Gevork Babityan (visual effects artists); Andranik Taranyan (compositing supervisor)	Cinemax
2013	Hawaii Five-0	"La O Na Makuahine"	Armen V. Kevorkian (visual effects supervisor); Jeremy Jozwik, Rick Ramirez, Gevork Babityan (visual effects artists); Andranik Taranyan (compositing supervisor)	CBS
2013	Magic City	"Angels of Death"	Doug Ludwig (visual effects supervisor); Mark Velazquez, Seth Brower (digital compositors); Jeremy Jozwik (visual effects artist); Chad Schott (compositing supervisor)	Starz
2013	Under the Dome	"Pilot"	Stephan Szpak-Fleet (visual effects supervisor), Matthieu Perin (digital compositor), Jeremy Jozwik (visual effects artist), Chad Schott (compositing supervisor), Arutyun Artur Sayan (cg lighting and texturing)	CBS
2014	Game of Thrones	"The Children" †	Joe Bauer, Sven Martin, Jörn Großhans, Thomas Schelesny, Matthew Rouleau (visual effects supervisors)	HBO
2014	Hawaii Five-0	"Ho'onani Makuakane" ‡‡	Armen V. Kevorkian (visual effects supervisor), Jane Sharvina (compositing supervisor), Andranik Taranyan (lead compositor), Dan Lopez (lead cg artist), Steve Graves (cg artist)	CBS
2014	House of Cards	"Chapter 19"	James Pastorius (visual effects supervisor), Andrew Roberts (cg supervisor), Andy Witkowski (lead compositor), Rusty Ippolito (lead cg artist)	Netflix
2014	Silicon Valley	"Articles of Incorporation"	Lawson Deming (visual effects supervisor), Cory Jamieson (visual effects producer), Bill Parker (lead compositor), Casi Blume (lead cg artist), Seth Cobb (visual effects artist)	HBO
2014	Tyrant	"Pilot"	Doug Ludwig (visual effects supervisor), Chad Schott (compositing supervisor), Lindsay M. Hoppe (lead compositor), Gevork Babityan (visual effects artist), Arutyun Artur Sayan (cg lighting and texturing)	FX
2015	Game of Thrones	"The Dance of Dragons" †	Joe Bauer (visual effects supervisor); Steve Kullback (visual effects producer); Derek Spears (lead cg supervisor); Eric Carney, Jabbar Raisani (additional visual effects supervisors)	HBO
2015	Agent Carter	"Now is Not the End"	Sheena Duggal, Richard Bluff, Jay Mehta (visual effects supervisors); Chad Taylor (compositing supervisor)	ABC
2015	Black Sails	"XVIII." ‡	Erik Henry (visual effects supervisor); Ken Mitchel Jones, Nic Spier (visual effects artists); Christina Spring, Björn Ahlstedt (digital compositors)	Starz
2015	The Flash	"Grodd Lives" ‡	Armen V. Kevorkian (visual effects supervisor), Andranik Taranyan (compositing supervisor), Stefan Bredereck (cg supervisor), Jason Shulman (animation supervisor), Gevork Babityan (visual effects artist)	The CW
2015	Ripper Street	"Whitechapel Terminus"	Ed Bruce (visual effects supervisor); Nicholas Murphy (visual effects coordinator); John O'Connell (cg supervisor); Joseph Courtis, Ronan Gantly (digital compositors)	Amazon
2016	Game of Thrones	"Battle of the Bastards" †	Joe Bauer, Glenn Melenhorst (visual effects supervisors); Eric Carney (visual effects plate supervisor); Derek Spears, Matthew Rouleau (lead cg supervisors)	HBO
2016	Black Sails	"XXI."	Erik Henry (visual effects supervisor), Jens Tenland (lead compositor), Matt Dougan (lead digital artist), Martin Öhgren (cg lighting and texturing), Nicklas Andersson (cg artist)	Starz
2016	The Flash	"Gorilla Warfare"	Armen V. Kevorkian (visual effects supervisor), Andranik Taranyan (compositing supervisor), Gevork Babityan (lead digital artist), Jason Shulman (animation supervisor)	The CW
2016	Ripper Street	"The Strangers' Home (Parts 1 & 2)"	Ed Bruce, Nicholas Murphy (visual effects supervisor); Denny Cahill (lead compositor); John O'Connell (lead cg artist)	Amazon
2016	Supergirl	"Pilot"	Armen V. Kevorkian (visual effects supervisor), Andranik Taranyan (compositing supervisor), Gevork Babityan (lead digital artist), Elaina Scott (lead animator), Arutyun Artur Sayan (cg lighting and texturing)	CBS
2017	Black Sails	"XXIX." ‡	Erik Henry, Martin Lipmann (visual effects supervisors); Yafei Wu (cg supervisor); David Wahlberg (lead compositor); Nicklas Andersson (cg artist)	Starz
2017	The Crown	"Windsor" ‡‡	Ben Turner, Tom Debenham (visual effects supervisors); Oliver Cubbage (cg supervisor); Lionel Heath (compositing supervisor); Charlie Bennett (lead matte painter)	Netflix
2017	Ripper Street	"Occurrence Reports"	Ed Bruce, Nicholas Murphy (visual effects supervisor); Mark Pinheiro (compositing supervisor); Denny Cahill (lead compositor); Piotr Swigut (lead matte painter)	Amazon
2017	Taboo	"Episode 1" ‡‡	Henry Badgett (visual effects supervisor); Simon Rowe, Finlay Duncan, Alexander Kirichenko (digital compositors); Nic Birmingham (lead cg lighting artist)	FX
2017	Westworld	"The Bicameral Mind" †	Jay Worth, Bobo Skipper (visual effects supervisors); Paul Ghezzo (cg supervisor); Jens Tenland (lead compositor); Gustav Ahren (senior facial modeler)	HBO

Outstanding Visual Effects - Television (Under 13 Episodes)

Year	Program	Episode(s)	Nominees	Network
2018	Game of Thrones	"Beyond the Wall" †	Joe Bauer, David Ramos (visual effects supervisors); Eric Carney, Ted Rae (additional visual effects supervisors); Steve Kullback (visual effects producer)	HBO
2018	Altered Carbon	"Out of the Past" ‡	Everett Burrell, Steve Moncur (visual effects supervisors); Tony Meagher, Christine Lemon, Paul Jones (visual effects producers)	Netflix
2018	Black Mirror	"Metalhead"	Michael Bell (visual effects supervisor); Russell McLean, Pete Levy (visual effects producers), Steven Godfrey (cg supervisor); Stafford Lawrence (digital artist)	Netflix
2018	Outlander	"Eye of the Storm"	Richard Briscoe, Aladino V. Debert (visual effects supervisors); Daniel Norlund (digital compositor); Filip Orrby (digital artist); Greg Teegarden (cg supervisor)	Starz
2018	Westworld	"The Passenger" ‡	Jay Worth, Bruce Branit, Bobo Skipper, Kama Moiha, Michael Enriquez (visual effects supervisors)	HBO
2019	Game of Thrones	"The Bells" †	Steve Kullback, Joe Bauer, Ted Rae, Mohsen Mousavi, Thomas Schelesny	HBO
2019	Chernobyl	"1:23:45" ††	Lindsay McFarlane, Max Dennison, Clare Cheetham, Steven Godfrey, Luke Letkey	HBO
2019	Game of Thrones	"The Long Night"	Martin Hill, Nicky Muir, Mike Perry, Mark Richardson, Darren Christie	HBO
2019	The Man in the High Castle	"Jahr Null"	Lawson Deming, Cory Jamieson, Casi Blume, Nick Chamberlain, William Parker, Saber Jlassi, Chris Parks	Amazon
2019	The Umbrella Academy	"The White Violin" ‡	Everett Burrell, Misato Shinohara, Chris White, Jeff Campbell, Sebastien Bergeron	Netflix

== Programs with multiple wins ==
6 awards

- Game of Thrones (HBO)

== Programs with multiple nominations ==
7 nominations

- Game of Thrones (HBO)

3 nominations

- Black Sails (Starz)
- Ripper Street (Amazon)

2 nominations

- Boardwalk Empire (HBO)
- Castle (ABC)
- The Flash (The CW)
- Hawaii Five-0 (CBS)
- House (Fox)
- Westworld (HBO)
