= Leviathan (Marvel Comics) =

Fictional comic book villains

- The Leviathan Horde as seen in Secret Warriors #11

Publication information
- Publisher: Marvel Comics
- First appearance: Dark Reign: The List - Secret Warriors #1 (Oct 2009)
- Created by: Jonathan Hickman (writer); Stefano Caselli (artist)

In-story information
- Type of organization: Terrorist

Leviathan (Russian: Левиафан), also called the Leviathan Horde, is a fictional Soviet-based terrorist organization appearing in American comic books published by Marvel Comics.

== Publication history ==
Leviathan first appeared in Dark Reign: The List - Secret Warriors and was created by Jonathan Hickman and Stefano Caselli.

== Fictional organization history ==
Leviathan originated in the Communist Bloc in the same way that Hydra was born out of the Axis powers. The group brought 100,000 of the Eastern Bloc's Cold War agents to the facility known as Cold Storage, where the majority were placed in cryonic suspension until needed. The higher ups of Leviathan were involved in a collaborative game with the Hydra leader Baron Strucker, S.H.I.E.L.D. leader Nick Fury, and Hand grandmaster Soji Soma. They gathered alien technology from the Brood and a collection of tanks which, when combined, could turn a man into a Super Soldier. Leviathan chose to betray their partners and take the technology for themselves. Hydra and the Hand struck back, stealing the alien power source and making it so that the tanks would turn their occupants into monsters.

During the Dark Reign storyline, Leviathan attacks Agarashima, stronghold of Clan Yashida, where Silver Samurai is attacked and subdued by demonic warriors. One of the warrior plunges its claws into his face before determining that he does not have what they are looking for. The largest grabs Silver Samurai, demanding to know where "the box" is. The same warriors attack the Nemesis shipyards where Gorgon is and introduce themselves as members of Leviathan.

Gorgon fights through the Leviathan squad and confronts its leader, who states that there are plans within plans and his masters are waking from their long sleep. He uses his claws to puncture Gorgon's face, intending to find information for his masters. Gorgon quickly reacts by slicing off his arm before pinning him with his sword. The ruling council of Hydra (consisting of Baron Strucker, Gorgon, Kraken, and Madame Hydra) discusses Leviathan's attack on Nemesis, which cost them two dreadnaughts and half of their personnel. Gorgon concludes that there is a traitor in this room. However, Madame Hydra asserts that the whole attack may have been staged. Nonetheless, Kraken informs everyone that the Psi-agents who were retrieved from Red Worm have been repurposed to find the traitor. At Leviathan's cold storage facilities called the Long Winter, Leviathan brings in Viper for interrogation. The leader demands to know where "the box" is. When she refuses to comply, they plunge their claws into her face before determining that she does not know. The Leviathan members learn that Madame Hydra has the box.

Madame Hydra's transport approaches Leviathan's base Long Winter. The Leviathan commander allows her to land. However, Leviathan wants something valuable in return: the box that Madame Hydra had procured from the Yashidas. Madame Hydra presents the Japanese box to Leviathan leader Magadan, much to the dismay of Viper. However, it is not intended for trade, but a gift. Viper frantically ask how she could betray everything she believes in. Madame Hydra responds that she had done this more than more and shoots her. Madame Hydra then takes off her headdress to return to her identity as Valentina Allegra de Fontaine. De Fontaine explains that while Hydra is technologically advanced, they are struggling with recruitment and divided interests. Magadan's lieutenants then hook up the box and defrost one of the containers, awakening its occupant Orion. Hydra arrives at Long Winter only to find it deserted except for a few squads left behind and the corpse of Viper. One Hydra agent brings to Baron Strucker a holographic recorder, which projects an image of Orion.

The Leviathan delegation later arrives at a Hydra base in Kyoto. De Fontaine is shocked to see Viper alive with tentacles on her head and having regained her status as Madame Hydra. As the meetings begin, Orion gives out an offer of subservience from Hydra. Strucker refuses to and orders Gorgon to kill him. However, Orion survives a stab to the shoulder from Gorgon as Magadan whacks him away with his hammer. A Leviathan squadron attacks, sparking a war between Hydra and Leviathan. Leviathan considers a ceasefire, only for Magadan to be assassinated.

At the Leviathan base Perestroika, Orion and de Fontaine plot to assault Gorgon and Madame Hydra. Then suddenly, all their Leviathan soldiers begin to self-destruct. They blame the hit on Nick Fury. De Fontaine later turns herself over to a federal agency in Berlin. It is revealed that, when Magadan plugged in the Legacy technology, he was unaware that Fury was controlling the system, feeding the Leviathan warriors energy and causing them to self-destruct. The only survivor is Orion, who has a thousand lifetimes to burn out.

== Members ==
- Vasili Dassaiev / Magadan - The leader of Leviathan. Assassinated by John Garrett to frame Hydra.
- Viktor Uvarov / Orion - A mercenary of Leviathan. Killed by Phil Coulson.
- Valentina Allegra de Fontaine - Revealed to be a mole in S.H.I.E.L.D. and Hydra.

== In other media ==
- Leviathan appears in Avengers Confidential: Black Widow & Punisher.
- Leviathan appears in Agent Carter. This version was founded following World War I on the order of Joseph Stalin, its members including Johann Fennhoff and Dorothy "Dottie" Underwood. By the end of the first season, Fennhoff is arrested by the Strategic Scientific Reserve while Underwood escapes. In the second season, Underwood is captured and brought into FBI custody.
