= Bridget Regan =

American actress (born 1982)

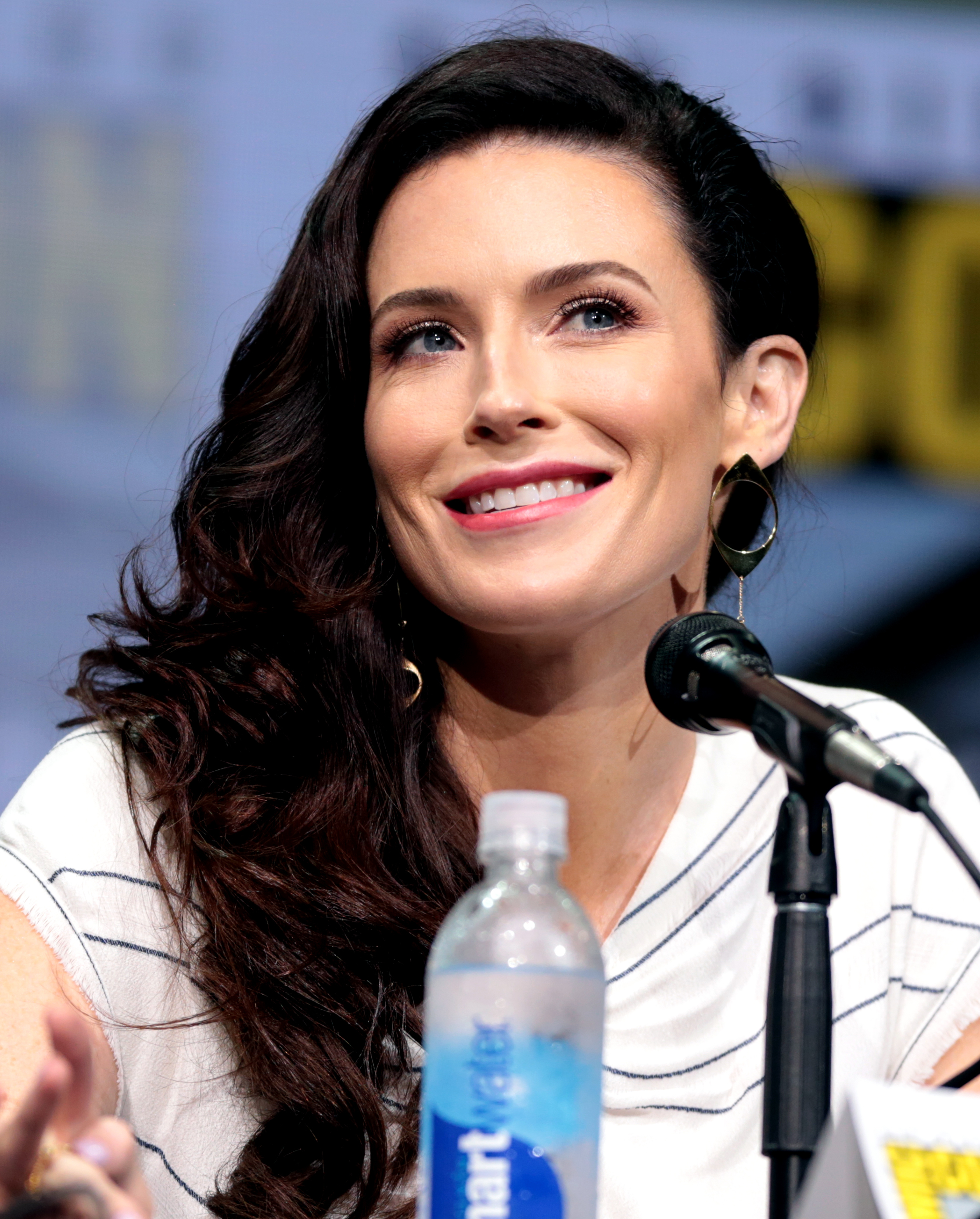
- Regan at the 2017 San Diego Comic-Con
- Born: Bridget Catherine Regan; February 3, 1982 (age 44); Carlsbad, California, U.S.
- Education: University of North Carolina School of the Arts (BFA)
- Occupation: Actress
- Years active: 1999–present
- Spouse: Eamon O'Sullivan
- Children: 2

Bridget Catherine Regan (/ˈriːɡənˈ/ REE-gən; born February 3, 1982) is an American actress best known for her lead roles as Kahlan Amnell in the ABC adventure romance series Legend of the Seeker (2008–10) and Sasha Cooper in the last three seasons of the TNT action drama series The Last Ship (2016–18), as well as her recurring roles as Rebecca Lowe/Rachel Turner in the USA Network police procedural drama series White Collar (2013–14), Rose Solano in The CW romantic comedy drama series Jane the Virgin (2014–19), Dottie Underwood in the ABC action adventure superhero series Agent Carter (2015–16), and lawyer Monica Stevens in the ABC police series The Rookie (2018–2026). Regan has also appeared in films such as The Babysitters (2007), John Wick (2014), and Devil's Gate (2017).

== Early life and education ==
Born in Carlsbad, California, Bridget Catherine Regan grew up in a family of Irish and German descent and was raised Catholic. She began acting as a child in North County productions of The Wizard of Oz at the La Paloma Theatre and Joseph and the Amazing Technicolor Dreamcoat in Carlsbad.

Regan attended University of North Carolina School of the Arts, graduating with a BFA in drama in 2004. After college, she moved to New York City to pursue a professional acting career.

== Career ==
Since 2006, Regan has appeared in various television shows and in films. In 2008, she began filming Legend of the Seeker, a television show based on Terry Goodkind's Sword of Truth series. She portrayed Mother Confessor Kahlan Amnell, which earned her a cult following. A natural redhead, Regan dyed her hair brown for the role. In 2009, she ventured into producing with Camp Wanatachi, a musical that ran in New York at La MaMa Experimental Theatre Club.

Regan was cast as a lead for the proposed television series The Frontier in 2012.

In 2013, she began a recurring role in the fifth season of the USA Network crime drama White Collar as Rebecca Lowe/Rachel Turner, a brief love interest of Neal Caffrey. That same year, she joined the series Beauty & the Beast for a multi-episode arc as Alex, the ex-fiancée of Vincent Keller (Jay Ryan).

In 2014, Regan was cast in a recurring role in Jane the Virgin, as Rose, a former lawyer, later criminal mastermind, who is involved in a complicated same-sex love affair. Also that year, she had a small role in John Wick, as Addy.

In 2014, Regan was cast in the recurring role of Dottie Underwood for 2015 in the comic book-based television series Agent Carter.

In 2016, Regan portrayed military surgeon Megan Hunt in episode 8, season 13 of Grey's Anatomy. The show later recast the role with Abigail Spencer replacing Regan.

In 2016, Regan was added to the cast of the TNT drama series The Last Ship for the show's third season, playing the role of Sasha Cooper, a current diplomat in Asia and a former Navy Intelligence Officer.

In 2021, Regan was cast as Poison Ivy in the third season of The CW drama series Batwoman.

In 2025, she appeared in the film Things Like This, directed by Max Talisman. The same year, she played Moira Blake on ABC's 9-1-1, where her actions led to the death of original cast member Captain Robert (Bobby) Wade Nash.

== Personal life ==
Regan is married to Eamon O'Sullivan, a writer she met in New Zealand while filming Legend of the Seeker. They have two children.

From 2009 to 2013, Regan was selected by comic book fans and critics as their ideal choice to portray Wonder Woman.

In 2025, Regan was briefly hospitalized in Prague for food poisoning while filming for a season 8 episode of The Rookie.

== Filmography ==
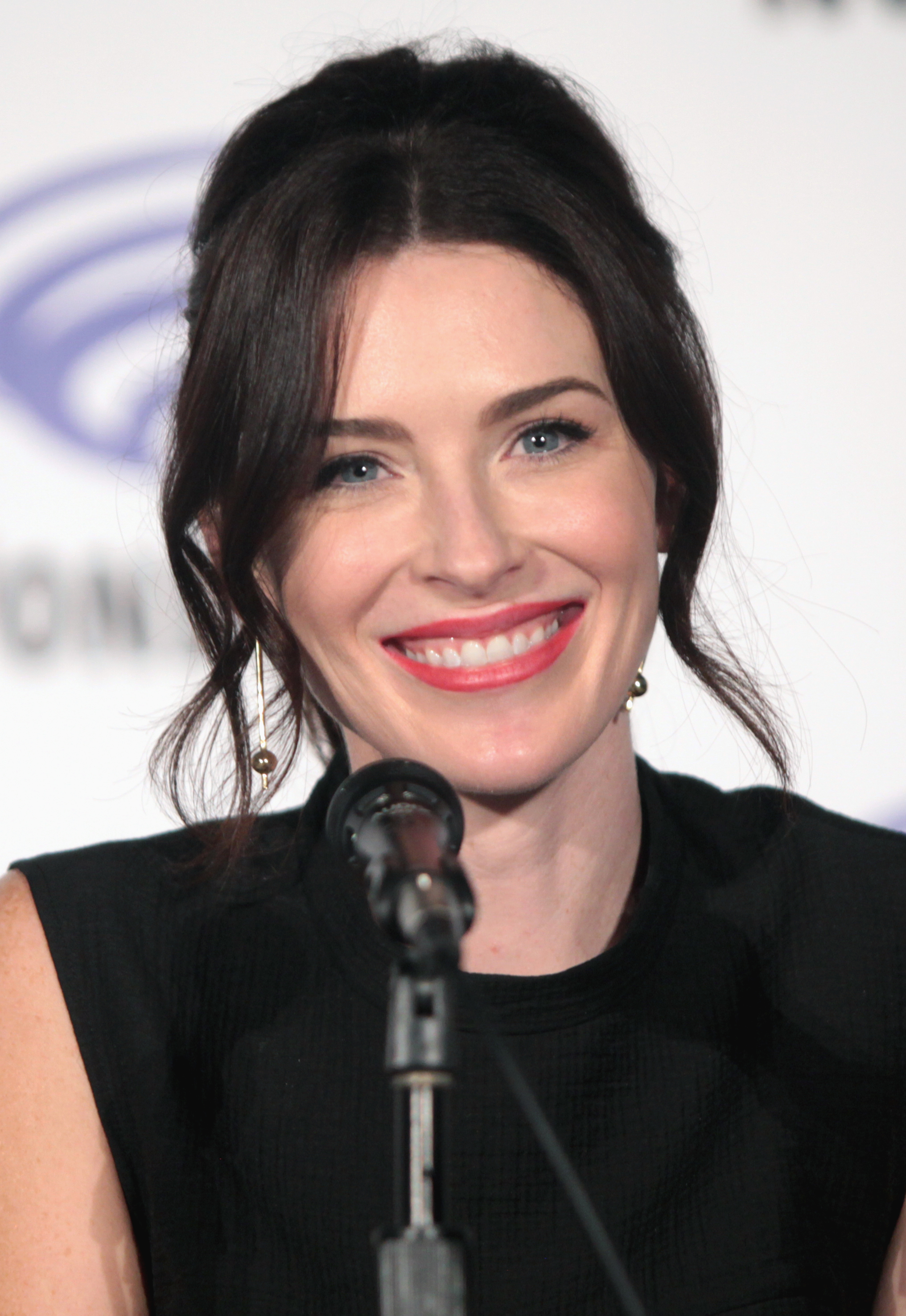
Regan at the 2016 WonderCon

=== Film ===
Key
†	Denotes films that have not yet been released

Year	Title	Role	Notes
2006	Blinders	Vivian	Short film
2007	The Babysitters	Tina Tuchman	
2008	Sex and the City	Hostess	
2010	The Best and the Brightest	Robin	
2014	John Wick	Addy	
2015	The Leisure Class	Fiona	HBO's Project Greenlight season 4 film
2017	Devil's Gate	Maria Pritchard	
2025	Sarah's Oil	Kate Barnard	
2026	The Drawing †	Gabrielle	Post-production

=== Television ===
Year	Title	Role	Notes
2006	The Wedding Album	Kate	TV pilot
2006	Love Monkey	Woman	Episode: "Pilot"
2006–2007	Law & Order: Criminal Intent	ADA Claudia Shankly	Episodes: "Masquerade", "Silencer"
2007	Six Degrees	Diana Foss	Episode: "A Simple Twist of Fate"
2007	American Experience	Angelica Shippen	Episode: "Alexander Hamilton"
2007	The Black Donnellys	Trish Hughes	4 episodes
2007	Supreme Courtships	Holly	Television film (Fox)
2008	New Amsterdam	Daphne Tucker	Episode: "Keep the Change"
2008 – 2010	Legend of the Seeker	Kahlan Amnell	Main role (44 episodes)
2011	NCIS: Los Angeles	Elizabeth Smith	Episode: "Cyber Threat"
2011	Hide	Annabelle Granger	Television film (TNT)
2011	Person of Interest	Wendy McNally	Episode: "Number Crunch"
2012	The Frontier	Hannah Strong	TV pilot
2012	Perception	Victoria Ryland	Episodes: "Shadow", "Light"
2013	Murder in Manhattan	Lex Sutton	Television film (ABC)
2013	Beauty & the Beast	Alex Salter	4 episodes
2013	Sons of Anarchy	Escort	Episode: "Straw"
2013–2014	White Collar	Rebecca Lowe / Rachel Turner	Recurring role, 9 episodes
2014–2019	Jane the Virgin	Rose / Sin Rostro	Recurring role
2015	The Good Wife	Madeline Smulders	Episode: "Bond"
2015	Magic Stocking	Lindsey Monroe	Television film (Hallmark Movies & Mysteries)
2015–2016	Agent Carter	Dottie Underwood	Recurring role; 10 episodes
2016	Grey's Anatomy	Megan Hunt	Episode: "The Room Where It Happens"
2016–2018	The Last Ship	Sasha Cooper	Main role (season 3–5)
2017	Christmas Getaway	Emory Blake	Television film (Hallmark)
2019	MacGyver	Charlotte Cole	Episode: "Fence + Suitcase + Americium-241"
2020	Paradise Lost	Frances Forsythe	Lead role
2021–2022	Batwoman	Pamela Isley / Poison Ivy	3 episodes
2022–2023	The Winchesters	Rockin' Roxy	4 episodes
2023	The Company You Keep	Tina	1 episode
2022–2026	The Rookie	Monica Stevens	Recurring role; 12 episodes
2025	9-1-1	Moira Blake	2 episodes
2026	Matlock	Samantha Barrett	2 episodes

== Theater ==
Year	Title	Role	Theatre
October 12 – November 14, 1999	Sweet Bird of Youth		La Jolla Playhouse
March 21, 2005	Children and Art		Broadway
September 20 – October 23, 2005	The Scottish Play	Eden	La Jolla Playhouse
December 9, 2007 – March 9, 2008	Is He Dead?	Cecile Leroux	Broadway
January 21, 2008	Geneva	Begonia Brown	The Players
January 21 – February 6, 2011	Camp Wanatachi	(co-producer)	La MaMa Experimental Theater Club
July 30 – August 1, 2017	Camp Wanatachi	(co-producer)	The Green Room 42
April 18–20, 2024	Cat on a Hot Tin Roof	Maggie	Stella Adler Theatre
February 20-22, 2026	A Streetcar Named Desire	Blanche	KAPA Repertory Theatre
