= Daniel Sousa (Marvel Cinematic Universe) =

Fictional character in the Marvel Cinematic Universe

- Marvel Cinematic Universe character
- Enver Gjokaj as Daniel Sousa in the seventh season of Agents of S.H.I.E.L.D.
- First appearance: "Now is Not the End"; Agent Carter; (2015)
- Last appearance: "What We're Fighting For"; Agents of S.H.I.E.L.D.; (2020)
- Created by: Christopher Markus; Stephen McFeely
- Portrayed by: Enver Gjokaj

In-universe information
- Full name: Daniel Jordan Sousa
- Occupation: Agent of S.H.I.E.L.D.; West Coast Security Chief of S.H.I.E.L.D. (formerly); Agent of SSR (formerly); Chief of the SSR (formerly)
- Significant others: Daisy Johnson; Peggy Carter (formerly); Violet (ex-fiancé)
- Nationality: American

Daniel Jordan Sousa is a fictional character portrayed by Enver Gjokaj in the Marvel Cinematic Universe (MCU). A war veteran and agent with the SSR (and later S.H.I.E.L.D.) who experiences prejudice due to his leg injury, he was created for Agent Carter (2015–2016). Gjokaj then signed a deal to return for the seventh season of Agents of S.H.I.E.L.D. (2020).

== Fictional character biography ==
=== Agent Carter ===
In the first season of Agent Carter, set in 1946, Sousa's own investigation into Howard Stark after he is framed for supplying deadly weapons to enemies of the United States leads to him discovering Peggy Carter's secret providence of him with assistance. In the second season, set in 1947, his relationship with Carter becoming complicated, Sousa accepts the position of chief of the Los Angeles SSR office to get some distance from her, and eventually begins a new relationship with Violet, a nurse. However, Violet leaves Sousa when she discovers that he still has feelings for Carter; Sousa eventually begins a relationship with Carter, once they defeat Whitney Frost together.

=== Agents of S.H.I.E.L.D. ===
Gjokaj reprises his role as Sousa during the seventh season of Agents of S.H.I.E.L.D.. In 1955, he first encounters the main time-travelling S.H.I.E.L.D. team after he encounters Jemma Simmons impersonating Peggy Carter, their relationship having ended. After preventing him from being assassinated by a Hydra agent sent by Wilfred Malick as he originally was in history, Sousa joins the team in their mission through time against the Chronicoms, entering a romantic relationship with Daisy Johnson after being trapped in a time loop. In the process, a new and more advanced prosthetic leg is built for him which enables him to walk and run normally again. One year after defeating the Chronicoms, Sousa joins the present day S.H.I.E.L.D. and continues to work alongside Daisy and Kora.

=== Avengers ===
Before his role in Agent Carter, Gjokaj was cast in a short scene in Avengers as a policeman named Officer Saunders. Though there were discussions connecting Sousa to this policeman in later releases, it was never made official.

== Concept and creation ==
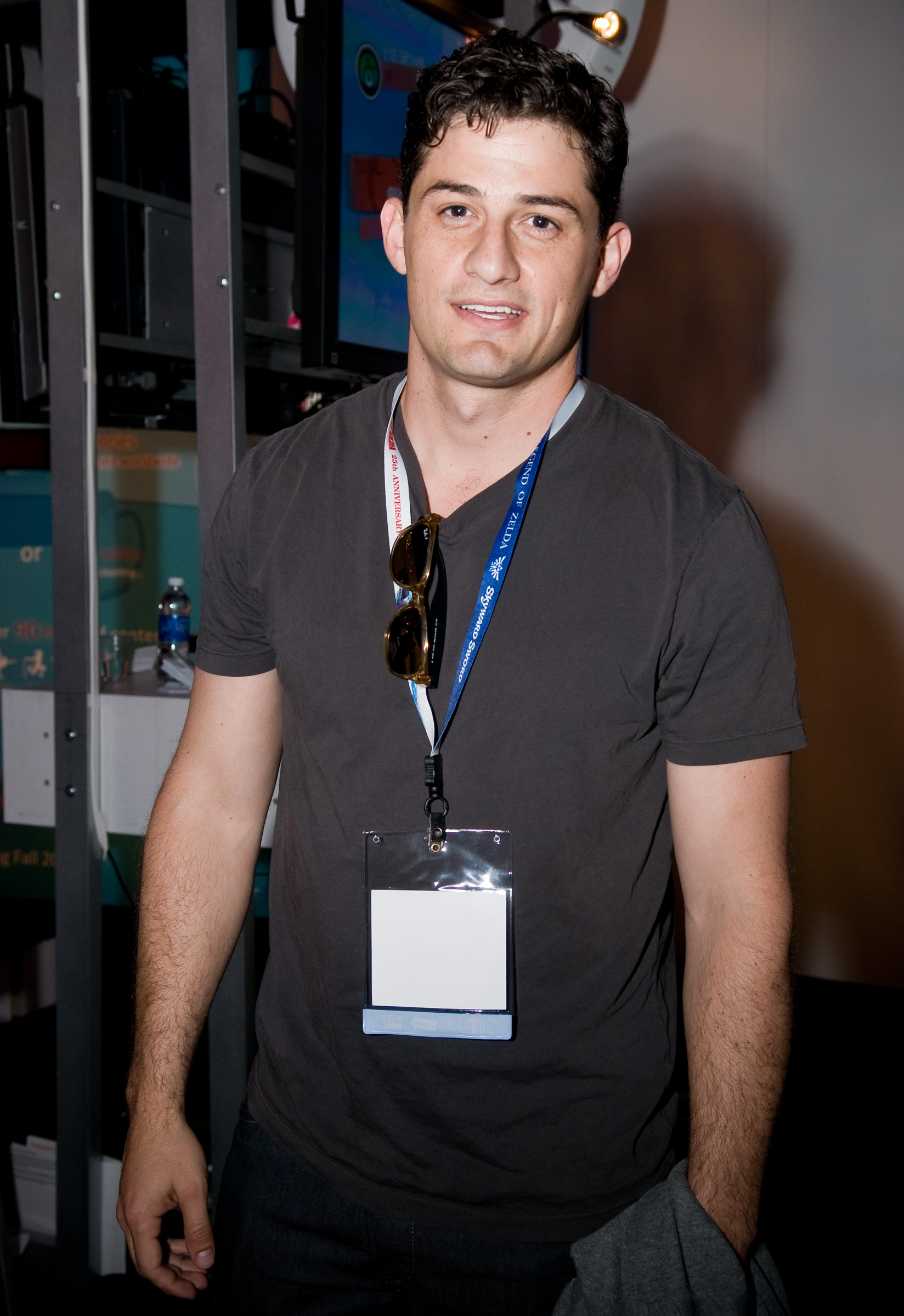
Enver Gjokaj.

Enver Gjokaj was cast in the role in August 2014, having previously portrayed a police officer who encounters Steve Rogers / Captain America in the Marvel Cinematic Universe (MCU) film The Avengers (2012). "He was a soldier, and he had been very active all his life, and now he has to figure out how to use his brains, how to try to be smart," Gjokaj explained of the character. "He accepts his injury, he accepts his compromised status in society ... Peggy says, 'Forget this. I'm Peggy Carter. I'm going to do something else.' I think that's the difference between the two of them." Considering a potentially romantic relationship between Sousa and Carter, Gjokaj said, "I think there's definitely a situation where ... if she hadn't dated Captain America, he might ask her out for a drink. It's like if your new girlfriend dated Ryan Gosling. It's going to make you sweat a bit."

== Characterization ==
For the second season of Agent Carter, Gjokaj said, "you'll see him deal with actually being part of the machine. Not trying to get into the machine, but being the boss. The first season was him trying to be listened to, and now he's being listened to by a lot of people." The costumes for the SSR agents in the series are meant to be distinctive to help explain their characters: Sousa wears "sweater vests under his sport coats and pleated pants".

Ahead of the second season, Fazekas explained that after Carter turned Sousa down at the end of the first season, saying "Oh, let me take a rain check. I have something to do", Carter felt like a potential relationship was something she could consider, while Sousa "felt like he missed an opportunity there." Because of that, Sousa moved to Los Angeles to avoid Carter, and "They haven't spoken since he left. There's that interesting awkward [feeling] when they start working together again. But now Sousa has got a girlfriend and it's very serious, so that's a new thing for Peggy to deal with." Though Sousa and Carter do eventually get together in the second-season finale, the executive producers warned that this did not necessarily mean Sousa is Carter's future husband, who was first mentioned in Captain America: The Winter Soldier.

== See also ==
- Characters of the Marvel Cinematic Universe
