= Enver Gjokaj =

American actor

- Born: Enver Leif Gjokaj
- Education: University of California, Berkeley (BA); New York University (MFA)
- Occupation: Actor
- Years active: 2006–present

Enver Leif Gjokaj (/ɛnˈvɛər ˈdʒoʊkaɪ/ en-VAIR JOH-ky, is an American actor. He is known for his roles as Victor in the science fiction television series Dollhouse, Daniel Sousa in Agent Carter and Agents of S.H.I.E.L.D., and Clark Evans in Invasion.

== Early life ==
Gjokaj's father is Albanian, and his mother is American. Gjokaj has an older brother named Bekim and an identical twin brother named Demir. Both Gjokaj and his brother attended Amador High School, in Sutter Creek, California, where Gjokaj participated in multiple plays and variety shows. Gjokaj graduated with a Master of Fine Arts from New York University's Graduate Acting Program at the Tisch School of the Arts. While at NYU, he was a semi-finalist for Tisch's Vilar Global Fellows Program. In 2002, he received a Bachelor of Arts in English from UC Berkeley.

== Career ==
Beginning in 2009, Gjokaj played the role of Victor on the TV series Dollhouse. His character, whose real name is Anthony Ceccoli, is an "Active" (or "doll") inside the Dollhouse, taking on multiple personalities through the process of highly technological imprinting of memories. His identical twin brother Demir guest starred alongside Gjokaj in a dream sequence in a second-season episode of Dollhouse.

Gjokaj has since appeared in the films The Express: The Ernie Davis Story alongside Dennis Quaid, Taking Chance with Kevin Bacon, and Eagle Eye opposite Shia LaBeouf. Prior to his series regular role on Dollhouse, he appeared in the made-for-TV film Filthy Gorgeous and also had a recurring role on the television series The Book of Daniel. He also guest starred in episodes of Law & Order: Criminal Intent, Community, and The Unit. Gjokaj has appeared in Emergence as Agent Ryan Brooks, in NCIS: Hawai'i as Navy Captain Joe Milius and in Resident Alien as Joseph in recurring capacities.

Gjokaj has made multiple appearances in the Marvel Cinematic Universe. In 2012, he made an appearance in The Avengers as a New York City police officer. He later starred in the two seasons of Agent Carter (2015–2016) as Strategic Scientific Reserve (SSR) Agent Daniel Sousa. He went on to reprise this role in the final season of Agents of S.H.I.E.L.D. (2020).

In 2012, Gjokaj was awarded a patent for a focusing system for motion picture cameras.

In 2023, Gjokaj joined the cast of Invasion as Clark Evans.

== Filmography ==
=== Film ===
Year	Film	Role	Notes
2007	Spinning Into Butter	Greg Sullivan	
2008	The Express: The Ernie Davis Story	Dave Sarette	
2008	Eagle Eye	Remote Pilot	
2009	Tale of the Tribe	Micah	
2010	Stone	Young Jack	
2011	Eden	Eddie	
2012	The Avengers	Officer Saunders	Credited as "Young Cop"
2012	Would You Rather	Lucas	
2014	Lust for Love	Jake	
2016	Come and Find Me	Alexander	
2019	3022	Vincent Bernard	

=== Television ===
Year	Title	Role	Notes
2006	Filthy Gorgeous	Mirash	Television film
2006	The Book of Daniel	David	3 episodes
2006	The Path to 9/11	Unknown	Miniseries
2007	The Unit	Lloyd	Episode: "Binary Explosion"
2008	Law & Order: Criminal Intent	Peter Gardela	Episode: "Ten Count"
2009	Taking Chance	Corporal Arenz	Television film
2009–2010	Dollhouse	Victor/Anthony Ceccoli	Main role
2010	Lie to Me	Sgt. Jeff Turley	Episode: "React to Contact"
2010	Chase	Carson Puckett	Episode: "Havoc"
2010	Undercovers	Novak Hincir	Episode: "Funny Money"
2011	Community	Lukka	Episode: "Custody Law and Eastern European Diplomacy"
2011	Person of Interest	Lazlo Yogorov	Episode: "Witness"
2012	Hawaii Five-0	Marku	Episode: "Pa Make Loa"
2012	NCIS: Los Angeles	Marku	Episode: "Touch of Death"
2012	Dexter	Viktor Baskov	2 episodes
2013	Law & Order: Special Victims Unit	Michael Provo	Episode: "Beautiful Frame"
2013	Vegas	Tommy Stone	Recurring role
2013	Witches of East End	Mike	4 episodes
2013	The Walking Dead	Pete Dolgen	Episode: "Dead Weight"
2014–2015	Rizzoli & Isles	Jack Armstrong	4 episodes
2014	Extant	Sean Glass	Recurring role
2015–2016	Agent Carter	Daniel Sousa	Main role
2017–2018	Major Crimes	Hunt Sanford	2 episodes
2018	Kevin (Probably) Saves the World	Milk Carton (voice)	Episode: "Caught White-Handed"
2019–2021	The Rookie	Donovan	Recurring role
2019–2020	Emergence	Agent Ryan Brooks	Recurring role
2020	Agents of S.H.I.E.L.D.	Daniel Sousa	Recurring role
2021–2023	NCIS: Hawaiʻi	Navy Captain Joe Milius: Deputy Chief-of-Staff to Commander, Pacific Fleet	Recurring role
2022–2025	Resident Alien	Joseph Rainier	Recurring role
2023–present	Invasion	Clark Evans	Main role (season 2–present)

== Stage ==
Year	Title	Role	Location
2000	Christmas in Naples	Alberto	Williamstown Theatre Festival Nikos Stage, Williamstown, MA
2001	A New Brain	Mr. Bungee	The Julia Morgan Center for the Arts, Berkeley, CA
2005	As You Like It	Jaques de Boys	The Public Theater, Delacorte Theatre, New York, NY
2007	The Cherry Orchard	Pyotr Sergeyevich Trofimov	Boston University Theatre - Mainstage, Boston, MA
2015	Arms and the Man	Major Sergius Saranoff	The Old Globe, Theatre Donald and Darlene Shiley Stage, San Diego, CA
2016	Future Thinking	Jim Barnard	South Coast Repertory Segerstrom Stage, Costa Mesa, CA
2018	Fire in Dreamland	Jaap	The Public Theater Anspacher Theatre, New York, NY
