= Agent Carter season 2 =

Agent Carter
- Season 2
- Promotional poster
- Showrunners: Tara Butters; Michele Fazekas; Chris Dingess
- Starring: Hayley Atwell; James D'Arcy; Chad Michael Murray; Enver Gjokaj
- No. of episodes: 10

Release
- Original network: ABC
- Original release: January 19 – March 1, 2016

Season chronology
- ← Previous; Season 1

The second and final season of the American television series Agent Carter, which is inspired by the 2011 film Captain America: The First Avenger and the 2013 Marvel One-Shot short film of the same name, features the character Peggy Carter, based on the Marvel Comics character of the same name, as she moves to Los Angeles to deal with the threats of the new atomic age in the wake of World War II, gaining new friends, a new home, and potential new love. It is set in the Marvel Cinematic Universe (MCU), sharing continuity with the films of the franchise, and was produced by ABC Studios, Marvel Television, and Fazekas & Butters. Tara Butters, Michele Fazekas, and Chris Dingess served as showrunners.

In May 2015, a second season of Agent Carter was ordered, with Hayley Atwell, who reprises her role from the film series and One-Shot as Carter, returning to star. Alongside her, James D'Arcy, Chad Michael Murray, and Enver Gjokaj also return from the first season. Filming took place in Los Angeles in late 2015, with the season contrasting the lives of Carter and the Hedy Lamarr-inspired Whitney Frost, portrayed by recurring guest star Wynn Everett. Visual and practical effects were mixed to realize the setting and more fantastical elements of the series, while David Zippel and Louis van Amstel provided a musical dream sequence for the season. Other characters from previous MCU media also appear, as well as elements shared with the films and the television series Agents of S.H.I.E.L.D.

The 10-episode season aired on ABC from January 19 to March 1, 2016, during the season three mid-season break of Agents of S.H.I.E.L.D., and received generally positive reviews. Critics praised the performances, setting, and character development of Whitney Frost, but some elements, such as the season's ending and humor, were criticized, and viewership for the season was deemed too low. ABC canceled Agent Carter on May 12, 2016.

== Episodes ==
No. overall	No. in season	Title	Directed by	Written by	Original release date	U.S. viewers (millions)
9	1	"The Lady in the Lake"	Lawrence Trilling	Brant Englestein	January 19, 2016	3.18
In 1947 New York City, Chief Jack Thompson and Agent Peggy Carter of the Strategic Scientific Reserve (SSR) apprehend Soviet spy Dottie Underwood. Newly appointed Chief Daniel Sousa of the Los Angeles SSR office meets with Detective Andrew Henry, who has discovered a woman's body in a frozen lake during a heat wave. Sousa, doubting his inexperienced agents, asks Thompson for backup; he sends Carter. An autopsy shows that the body glows in the dark, likely caused by Isodyne Energy's particle accelerator. Carter learns from Isodyne scientist Jason Wilkes that the woman, physicist Jane Scott, had an affair with Isodyne owner and prospective senator Calvin Chadwick. Underwood is taken into FBI custody, with Thompson's mentor Vernon Masters warning him of greater forces than the SSR that may affect his future. Henry attempts to kill Wilkes, but is killed himself by a police officer; Henry and the officer were hired to cover up the murder by Chadwick and his actress wife Whitney Frost following the former's affair.
10	2	"A View in the Dark"	Lawrence Trilling	Eric Pearson & Lindsey Allen	January 19, 2016	3.18
Chadwick meets with the secretive Council of Nine, who shut down his Zero Matter program due to its seeming lack of results, and want him to focus on his senatorial ambitions. Chadwick informs Frost, who is the true brains behind the program, while struggling with her acting due to sexism in Hollywood. Wilkes meets with Carter to help with her investigation, though he is hesitant to turn on Isodyne—the only company willing to hire him as a black man. Wilkes explains that Isodyne had attempted to replicate the success of the Manhattan Project and in doing so had discovered Zero Matter. Scott must have come into physical contact with it, though its effects are not limited to freezing. Carter and Wilkes agree to steal the Zero Matter, but at Isodyne find Council agents destroying the program. Wilkes gets to the Zero Matter, where he is confronted by Frost, who is there to steal it herself. They are exposed to the substance in the ensuing scuffle, leaving Wilkes presumed dead and Frost having absorbed Zero Matter.
11	3	"Better Angels"	David Platt	Jose Molina	January 26, 2016	2.90
At Frost's behest, Chadwick frames Wilkes as a Communist spy who had infiltrated Isodyne and destroyed the facility. Thompson comes to Los Angeles to "clean-up" the situation at the invitation of Masters, sending Carter back to New York City where she enlists the help of Howard Stark to investigate the Arena Club—whose membership pin was borne by the Council of Nine agents—but is unable to prove that the Council has blackmailed Chadwick's senatorial competitor into dropping out of the race. Carter "misses" her flight, and after unsuccessfully confronting Frost, is attacked by Council hitman Rufus Hunt, barely fending him off. Investigating a gravitational anomaly around Carter, Stark discovers Wilkes is alive but temporarily invisible and non-corporeal, and goes in search of his mentor for help in restoring Wilkes' body. Frost absorbs her film director with newly discovered Zero Matter abilities, and Masters introduces Thompson to Chadwick to celebrate the latter's now guaranteed-senatorship, convincing Thompson that Carter was right.
12	4	"Smoke & Mirrors"	David Platt	Sue Chung	February 2, 2016	2.77
In the 1920s in Broxton, Oklahoma, Agnes Cully (Frost) is shown to have a brilliant mind, fixing a broken radio, inventing devices, and applying to a science program at Oklahoma University (unsuccessfully due to her gender). In 1934, Cully travels to Hollywood, where she is approached by a talent agent, promising to make her a star. In 1940 in England, Carter, who is engaged, receives an offer to join the Special Operations Executive due to her work at Bletchley Park as a codebreaker; she eventually accepts the offer and leaves her fiancé after her brother's, Michael, death in the war. In 1947, Carter and Edwin Jarvis kidnap Hunt in an attempt to learn more about the Council. After getting names of members of the Council of Nine and locations of transcripts of their meetings, Carter and Sousa prepare the SSR to infiltrate the Arena Club, but are stopped by Masters. They let a bugged Hunt escape, and he attempts to blackmail Chadwick in exchange for protection. Displeased with the mess he was causing, Frost absorbs Hunt, revealing her abilities to Chadwick.
13	5	"The Atomic Job"	Craig Zisk	Lindsey Allen	February 9, 2016	2.66
Wilkes becomes drawn to the Zero Matter in a sample of Scott's body. After absorbing that small amount, Wilkes temporarily regains his physical body and discovers the location of Scott's. Carter and Jarvis attempt to steal Scott's body, hoping that the rest of the Zero Matter within it will restore Wilkes permanently, but arrive to see Frost taking the Zero Matter for herself, before convincing Chadwick to help her steal an atomic bomb from the Council so she can replicate the original discovery of Zero Matter. They seek help from Frost's ex-boyfriend Joseph Manfredi, a crime lord, who gives them men for the job in exchange for Chadwick's influence in the media. Carter, Jarvis, Sousa and some SSR allies break into the Roxxon facility holding the bombs and disable them before Frost can reach them. Carter confronts Frost, but she escapes when Carter is impaled on a rebar. Sousa accidentally reveals to his new fiancé that he loves Carter, and while Wilkes comforts Carter as she recuperates, his form begins to fade away.
14	6	"Life of the Party"	Craig Zisk	Eric Pearson	February 16, 2016	2.39
Desperate to stabilize himself before he is completely drawn away, Wilkes designs a containment chamber for himself, but requires more Zero Matter. Carter realizes that Frost is now the only source of Zero Matter, but is still too injured to get it herself. Instead, she breaks Underwood out of prison, sending her to one of Chadwick's campaign events with Jarvis. The event is also cover for a Council of Nine meeting, with Chadwick having convinced them to see Frost (they usually never speak with outsiders, let alone women). Masters and Thompson are also at the event; Jarvis distracts Thompson while Underwood collects the Zero Matter from Frost using a device designed by Wilkes. Sousa tells Carter that his fiancée left him due to his supposed feelings for her. Underwood eavesdrops on the Council meeting, watching as Chadwick betrays Frost and has her restrained. Frost destroys Chadwick and half of the Council, proclaiming herself leader of the remaining Council members. Masters and Thompson capture Underwood for Frost.
15	7	"Monsters"	Metin Hüseyin	Brandon Easton	February 16, 2016	2.39
Frost and the Council of Nine cover up her murder of Chadwick and the other Council members, and Frost makes Manfredi her second-in-command. With the help of Jarvis's wife Ana, Wilkes uses the Zero Matter and containment chamber to restore his physical form, though he knows he cannot leave the chamber for long. Masters tries to interrogate Underwood, before Frost reassigns him to finding the uranium that Carter and company stole from the Roxxon bombs. Frost interrogates Underwood herself, using her abilities, and learns that Carter wanted the Zero Matter because of Wilkes and his condition. Frost sets a trap, luring Carter and Jarvis away from Wilkes. Masters attempts to get Sousa to cooperate in retrieving the uranium, and when he refuses, has men attack him at home, forcing Sousa to take leave—Masters takes over the Los Angeles office of the SSR. Frost and Manfredi kidnap Wilkes, with Frost hoping to help and study him. To slow down Carter's pursuit of them, Frost shoots Ana, and while Carter and Jarvis are focused on saving Ana, Underwood escapes.
16	8	"The Edge of Mystery"	Metin Hüseyin	Brant Englestein	February 23, 2016	2.50
Frost tells Wilkes that if he accepts the power of the Zero Matter within him then he will be able to control it. Carter and Sousa meet with Frost, giving her fake uranium in exchange for Wilkes. Frost soon realizes the ruse, and pursues them. Wilkes, learning to control his abilities and change between corporeal and non-corporeal states, turns on Carter, demanding that Sousa reveal the location of the real uranium. Sousa directs him to a vault at the SSR. Ana survives surgery, but loses the ability to have children. Thompson overhears Frost telling Masters to retrieve the uranium, but is incapacitated by Masters. Carter and Sousa join Thompson, and, along with Jarvis and a new gamma cannon courtesy of Stark, travel to the Isodyne atomic testing area. Wilkes is sucked into a rift created by the now armed atomic bomb, but the cannon closes the rift and returns Wilkes, now full of Zero Matter. A revenge-seeking Jarvis shoots Frost, but she survives due to her Zero Matter. Jarvis and Carter are taken hostage by Manfredi's men.
17	9	"A Little Song and Dance"	Jennifer Getzinger	Story by : Michele Fazekas & Tara Butters; Teleplay by : Chris Dingess	February 23, 2016	2.50
Carter and Jarvis escape capture while Thompson and Sousa return to the SSR. Manfredi sets up a new lab for Frost in an abandoned facility, where she begins trying to take all of Wilkes' Zero Matter for herself. Thompson convinces Masters to use the gamma cannon against Frost, then visits Frost, warning her of Masters' treachery and offering to turn on him in exchange for a seat on the Council of Nine. Thompson then turns on Carter and Sousa, delaying them, as he actually intends to remote detonate the cannon to kill Frost, Masters, and Wilkes. Thompson turns Masters over to Frost, but the SSR manage to jam his detonator signal before he can detonate the cannon. Carter tries to get Wilkes out of the building, but he refuses to leave knowing what he has become. Thompson holds the others at gunpoint until his signal is un-jammed, though Carter is still unwilling for Wilkes to die. As Frost begins killing Masters, he notices that the cannon is being activated. Wilkes finds them and unleashes all the Zero Matter from within himself.
18	10	"Hollywood Ending"	Jennifer Getzinger	Story by : Chris Dingess; Teleplay by : Michele Fazekas & Tara Butters	March 1, 2016	2.35
Frost absorbs the Zero Matter released from Wilkes, who is rescued by Carter, as Stark returns and aids in their escape. Thompson finds in Masters' possession a supposedly incriminating file on Carter and a secret Council of Nine key. Manfredi becomes concerned with Frost's behavior, and her new obsession with opening another rift, this time with a machine of her own design. He meets with Stark—an old friend of his—and the others, and agrees to distract Frost while Carter and Sousa photograph the blueprints for Frost's machine, which Stark and Wilkes build themselves. They open a new rift, and Frost is drawn to it. They use the gamma cannon to expel the Zero Matter from her, into the other dimension; Frost is left insane from her time controlled by the Zero Matter, and is placed in a mental asylum. Thompson gives the secret key to Carter, who is convinced to stay in Los Angeles to be with Sousa. Thompson prepares to return to New York, but is shot in his hotel room; the shooter takes the file on Carter.

== Cast and characters ==
=== Main ===
- Hayley Atwell as Peggy Carter
- James D'Arcy as Edwin Jarvis
- Chad Michael Murray as Jack Thompson
- Enver Gjokaj as Daniel Sousa

=== Recurring ===
- Bridget Regan as Dottie Underwood
- Wynn Everett as Whitney Frost
- Reggie Austin as Jason Wilkes
- Currie Graham as Calvin Chadwick
- Lotte Verbeek as Ana Jarvis
- Lesley Boone as Rose Roberts
- Matt Braunger as Aloysius Samberly
- Kurtwood Smith as Vernon Masters
- Rey Valentin as Vega
- Ken Marino as Joseph Manfredi

=== Notable guests ===
- Ray Wise as Hugh Jones
- Dominic Cooper as Howard Stark
- Lyndsy Fonseca as Angie Martinelli

== Production ==
=== Development ===
In January 2015, showrunners Michele Fazekas and Tara Butters confirmed that Agent Carter was not intended to be a miniseries, and that a possible second season would not necessarily be limited to eight episodes like the first. The series was renewed for a second season on May 7, 2015, intended to debut in 2016 of the 2015–16 season during the midseason break of the third season of Agents of S.H.I.E.L.D. Later in May, Hayley Atwell stated the season would consist of 10 episodes. Butters explained that this would probably not allow for any standalone episodes, "but I definitely think it allows for more character, because we can have more personal stories built into the framework of the overall arching mystery".

=== Writing ===
What I love about LA that is different than New York is you have the spectacular wealth and glamour and beauty right next to the grit and crime, often right up against each other. So I love telling those stories. I love ugly things happening in beautiful places. We're very much being inspired by noir films. We keep talking about L.A. Confidential and Chinatown and those great stories where you find out one thing—you're investigating one seemingly isolated crime, and it unveils a huge web of conspiracy and awfulness. So we're getting inspired by that.

— Executive producer Michele Fazekas on the difference between the first and second seasons' locations.

Before the second season was announced, Fazekas said that "We've certainly been talking about what a second season would look like...what's great about the structure of this show is, you can tell so many different stories and go so many different directions." Thus, Butters said of the first season storyline featuring Leviathan, "we wrapped up that story" already, with Toby Jones' cameo as Arnim Zola in the first-season finale just "a fun tie-in" rather than something that would be followed up on in the second season. Series creators Christopher Markus & Stephen McFeely revealed they "had a really nice story about who Peggy is and where she came from" that did not make it into the first season, but they hoped could be explored in a second, while Fazekas and Butters also revealed that there had been a story about Carter having "a night out with the girls" to explore her personal life, as well as more material for the character Angie, that they felt would both be easier to tell in a second season.

Season two is set in 1947, approximately six months to a year following the events of the first, with the time jump made to show "people are in a little bit different positions, and things have happened between these seasons that we maybe don't know about." Fazekas noted that "the challenge" for the season was to find a way to reunite Carter with Edwin Jarvis since he is "not an agent....that's a really important relationship, how do we keep them together?...The nice thing about Peggy this season is she's not having to hide her agenda from the SSR. [Jarvis] is helping her out, just in a different way." Elaborating on the SSR's role in the season, Fazekas explained that when Markus and McFeely created the organisation for Captain America: The First Avenger it was inspired by the Office of Strategic Services (OSS), which was "somewhat disbanded after the war, because it was created because of World War II. So now that the war is over, things are changing. And in real history, the OSS sort of became the CIA and some of its other functions went under other departments. There's a little bit of change going on within SSR and so Thompson [is now the New York SSR chief, but he] has a boss [in Vernon Masters] that's going to be saying, "Look, things are changing, and you need to look out for yourself."" The season also sees Daniel Sousa promoted to the chief of the Los Angeles SSR office.

The fictional company Isodyne Energy, who is involved with nuclear testing in the desert, was influenced by the real life 1940s companies such as Radiodyne, General Atomics or the beginnings of the Jet Propulsion Laboratory, "all of which were in L.A. in the '40s, and were developing the space program and were developing nukes." Additionally, the season avoids depicting real life Hollywood stars from the 1940s because "the focus would shift from story to: does that person look or sound like an actor?" Instead, the character Whitney Frost is depicted as an actress "who will have a part to play in our larger storyline." The season introduces the Council of Nine, based on the Secret Empire, who "meet at the Arena Club, which is like this social club of white guys. They're just the guys who sort of run the world. They have orchestrated assassinations. We insinuate that they orchestrated the 1929 Stock Market crash." Members of the Council include powerful businessmen Calvin Chadwick and Hugh Jones, and their influence extends to "high levels of the government" as seen with War Department veteran Vernon Masters. Despite close similarities between the "A" symbol of the Arena Club and a Hydra symbol introduced in the third season of Agents of S.H.I.E.L.D., Fazekas stated that she "would not say" there was a connection between the Council and Hydra.

With the introduction of Jason Wilkes and Frost, both considered "outsiders" as Carter was in the first season, co-showrunner Chris Dingess noted how their arcs in the season would be similar, yet different from Carter's, saying "I think everyone, to get to that place of getting respect, has a different road to get there. Everyone makes different choices along the way that define that road and I think with these three characters, everyone has a distinct, separate path." Atwell spoke specifically about the season's approach to diversity and prejudice, and noted that the series' crew had expanded to include African American and Asian writers as well as a female director. "Since the first season heavily focused on a woman in a man's world," Atwell said, "we're now going into more diversity and we're investigating different prejudices within this time and one of them absolutely would have been race, as we all know....if you have a staunchly white male cast then it might be more accurate of the time, but it becomes less relatable to our audiences, especially when the Marvel world's so diverse." On the racism issue, Butters stated, "We didn't want to just have an African-American character and not talk about that. That would have been very inauthentic." As for the sexism Frost faces, Gina McIntyre and Andrea Towers of Entertainment Weekly saw similarities with Jessica Jones when Frost is asked to smile by two different men in her flashbacks in "Smoke & Mirrors". Towers said, "The talent agent [who asks Frost to smile] may not be the Purple Man, but Whitney is certainly being ushered into a brainwashed mindset that will set her on a path she can't deviate from easily."

At the conclusion of the season, Fazekas recalled the potential story revolving around Carter having a girls night out, saying that they realized that "once Peggy is on the mission, it starts to become difficult for her to have a social life...we kept sort of punting that scene because every time we tried to do it, it was like, 'She's not going to stop to go out to dinner. She has the world to save.'" Also, they felt they were not properly servicing Angie's character, instead "just sticking her in scenes just to be there," resulting in the decision to ultimately not bring Angie back for the season as planned. In her place, the characters of Ana Jarvis and Rose Roberts are featured as confidante's for Carter, "both people who are 100% in on Peggy's secret. Angie sort of figures it out at the end of the first season but Ana and Rose—there is no need to hide the truth from them. So it makes it a lot easier for her to confide in them."

=== Casting ===
Hayley Atwell, James D'Arcy, Chad Michael Murray, and Enver Gjokaj return from the first season to star as Peggy Carter, Edwin Jarvis, Jack Thompson, and Daniel Sousa, respectively. By June 2015, it was reported that Marvel was working to have Bridget Regan (Dottie Underwood) and Lyndsy Fonseca (Angie Martinelli) return for the season. At Fan Expo Canada that September, Atwell confirmed that Regan would return for the season, with Dominic Cooper and Lesley Boone later also confirmed to be reprising their roles, respectively as Howard Stark and Rose Roberts. In December 2015, Fonseca was confirmed to return for a dream sequence in "A Little Song and Dance". Also returning for the second season was Ray Wise as Hugh Jones.

In August 2015, it was revealed that the character Whitney Frost would appear in the season, and Currie Graham was cast as her husband, Calvin Chadwick, the owner of Isodyne Energy. In October, Wynn Everett was revealed to be cast as Frost; Reggie Austin was cast as physicist Jason Wilkes; Lotte Verbeek was cast in the role of Ana Jarvis, the wife of Edwin Jarvis; and Kurtwood Smith was revealed to be recurring as Vernon Masters, a veteran of the War Department. The next month, Ken Marino was cast as Joseph Manfredi, leader of the Maggia crime syndicate. Additionally, Matt Braunger was cast as SSR lab tech Aloysius Samberly, and Rey Valentin was cast as SSR Agent Vega.

The dream sequence in "A Little Song and Dance", dubbed an informal crossover with Dancing with the Stars, features many of the professional dancers from that series, including Louis van Amstel, Dmitry Chaplin, Karina Smirnoff, Anna Trebunskaya, Sasha Farber, and Damian Whitewood. Dancers Robert Roldan, Malene Ostergaard, Amanda Balen, Serge Onik, Jenya Shatilova, Lacey Escabar, Alla Kocherga, and Paul Kirkland are also featured in the sequence.

=== Design ===
Series costume designer Giovanna Ottobre-Melton took inspiration from the films L.A. Confidential (1997), Chinatown (1974), and Who Framed Roger Rabbit (1988) to "represent the West Coast", and the "sunshine noir" feel of the era for the season. The then-just introduced "Dior New Look" is also referenced "with longer hemlines on supporting players." The dream sequence at the beginning of "A Little Song and Dance" was choreographed by Louis van Amstel and begins in black and white, before transitioning to color. Head of make-up Debra LaMia Denaver explained that for the Zero Matter "wound" on Frost's face, the "guidelines were for it to be like a cracked porcelain doll and then the black matter would come from inside out. From there, Jay [Wejebe, makeup artist] designed the prosthetics that we use and Robin [Beauchesne, key makeup artist] created all the different avenues the dark matter takes." Using reference photographs and pre-made prosthetics, the make-up team were ultimately able to apply the effect to Everett in 30 minutes.

=== Filming ===
Filming for the season began on August 31, and ended on December 19, 2015, with Edward J. Pei serving as director of photography. Unlike the first season, episodes were filmed concurrently, two at a time. Discussing the series' location move, Head of Marvel Television Jeph Loeb explained that "Agent Carter season one took place in New York in 1946. It wasn't like we could go to New York and find 1946, so we shot in L.A. But that's part of the reason that when we talked about it, we said, 'You know what? This season let's stay in L.A.' Because so much of L.A. still looks like it did in 1946." Butters expanded by saying the move to L.A. "was something we had talked about in the middle of the first season...[and] we realized that not only was it a good idea for the storytelling, but also...it's much easier for us to shoot L.A. for L.A. than try to shoot L.A. for New York." She added the season hoped to film at Musso & Frank Grill, the Formosa Cafe, the Griffith Observatory, racetracks, piers, and other locations in Downtown Los Angeles.

The Universal Studios Lot serves as the backlot for the film studio Stark starts, Stark Pictures, with filming also taking place at the Los Angeles River. The Dunbar Hotel, a famous jazz club where both African-Americans and Caucasians would attend, is portrayed in the season. The showrunners looked to the films L.A. Confidential, Chinatown, The Big Heat (1953), and The Lady from Shanghai (1947) when shaping the visuals for the season, with additional research provided by Pei. Butters said, "it doesn't feel like a different show. It just feels like an evolution of the show."

=== Visual effects ===
DNeg TV provided the visual effects for the season, with Sheena Duggal returning as visual effects supervisor. Effects created for the season included the Zero Matter and its related properties, such as people being frozen and shattered by it, the dimensional rifts and the levitated objects that get sucked into them, and Wilkes becoming intangible. Frost's Zero Matter "crack" on her face was also augmented with visual effects, to add depth, sentience, and an "infinite black" by color-correcting the image, with the effects animators studying "cracking glass to better capture the animation effect." 20 cast members were digitally scanned and modeled for interaction with Zero Matter, while many other instances required facial tracking markers on actors. For the Zero Matter itself, the design was described as a cross between "liquid spiders" and magnetic ferrofluid, the latter being used as an on set reference for the actors by Duggal. The main dimensional rifts were designed as black holes, based on the work of theoretical physicist Kip Thorne, which also inspired Double Negative's visual effects for Interstellar; the software developed for the film was reused for the series. DNeg TV also worked on Howard Stark's Hover car, using the original computer asset for the version seen in Captain America: The First Avenger. Despite the original car from the film being only a shell and destroyed after the picture, an identical Cadillac was found for DNeg to laser scan and incorporate into the episode along with the real car when it is parked on the ground.

=== Music ===
The dance number used in the dream sequence from "A Little Song and Dance" was an original song from lyricist David Zippel and series composer Christopher Lennertz, in conjunction with Butters and Fazekas. Titled "Whatcha Gonna Do (It's Up to You)", the single was performed by Atwell and Gjokaj along with the Hollywood Studio Symphony, and was released on iTunes on March 18, 2016.

=== Marvel Cinematic Universe tie-ins ===
In July 2015, Butters revealed that the season would feature the Darkforce, which ties to the characters Doctor Strange and Marcus Daniels, the latter having appeared in Agents of S.H.I.E.L.D. In January 2016, Fazekas elaborated, saying that the Darkforce, known as Zero Matter in the series, is the result of a nuclear test gone wrong by Isodyne Energy. Looking to the history of the Darkforce in the comics, Fazekas and Butters "were able to select what we liked and sort of make our own rules as to what it does, how it operates, and who it affects in our world." The producers tried to take a scientific approach to the explanation of the Zero Matter, consulting with theoretical physicist Clifford Johnson to help ground it in science. Johnson provided the science equations seen on blackboards throughout the season, as well as real world reference for the Zero Matter containment systems. The showrunners also conversed with Eric Carroll at Marvel Studios to ensure anything they were doing with the Darkforce would not contradict the Doctor Strange script, and to see if they could destroy Howard Stark's hover car, which was originally seen as a prototype in Captain America: The First Avenger. The mention in the season finale of the land Stark owns in Malibu is a reference to what will become the location for the home of his son, Tony, in the MCU films.

== Marketing ==
Footage from the first episode was screened at New York Comic Con in October 2015, while the first trailer for the season was released in November. Alice Walker of Screen Rant felt that the promo "highlight[ed] the best parts of the show", calling it "[f]ast paced and slick" and Atwell "still incredibly charming". She further noted that "There is a long way to go before we see if they can build on the momentum from the previous season, but so far it looks like a fun adventure." Conversely, Kaitlin Thomas at TV.com called the promo "weird", asking, "Why is ABC marketing Agent Carter like it's one of the network's casually daft melodramas instead of a well-written drama[?]...From a tonal and thematic standpoint, the series depicted in that trailer feels like the polar opposite of what it actually is....cutting together a bunch of scenes of Peggy punching people or holding a gun does not make her a badass when its framed in this way, and frankly, it's no wonder people aren't tuning in if that's the type of show they think this is." In March 2016, Maureen Ryan, writing for Variety, described the season's promotion as "lackluster", and blamed "the botched rollout of Season 2" for the season's ultimately poor viewership.

== Release ==
=== Broadcast ===
Season two of Agent Carter premiered on January 19, 2016, on ABC with a two-hour premiere, during the midseason break of the third season of Agents of S.H.I.E.L.D. It was originally scheduled to premiere on January 5, 2016, but was delayed due to an "earlier than usual" 2016 State of the Union Address. The season aired until March 1, 2016.

=== Streaming ===
On November 29, 2017, Hulu acquired the exclusive streaming rights to the series, and the season was made available on Disney+ at launch, on November 12, 2019.

== Reception ==
=== Ratings ===
Viewership and ratings per episode of Agent Carter season 2
No.	Title	Air date	Rating/share (18–49)	Viewers (millions)	DVR (18–49)	DVR viewers (millions)	Total (18–49)	Total viewers (millions)
1	"The Lady in the Lake"	January 19, 2016	0.9/3	3.18	0.7	2.01	1.6	5.18
2	"A View in the Dark"	January 19, 2016	0.9/3	3.18	0.7	2.01	1.6	5.18
3	"Better Angels"	January 26, 2016	0.9/3	2.90	0.6	1.81	1.5	4.71
4	"Smoke & Mirrors"	February 2, 2016	0.8/2	2.77	0.7	1.85	1.5	4.62
5	"The Atomic Job"	February 9, 2016	0.8/2	2.66	0.6	1.69	1.4	4.35
6	"Life of the Party"	February 16, 2016	0.7/2	2.39	0.6	1.57	1.3	3.96
7	"Monsters"	February 16, 2016	0.7/2	2.39	0.6	1.57	1.3	3.96
8	"The Edge of Mystery"	February 23, 2016	0.8/2	2.50	—N/a	1.42	—N/a	3.92
9	"A Little Song and Dance"	February 23, 2016	0.8/2	2.50	—N/a	1.42	—N/a	3.92
10	"Hollywood Ending"	March 1, 2016	0.7/2	2.35	0.6	1.46	1.3	3.81

The season averaged 4.37 million total viewers, including from DVR, ranking 109th among network series in the 2015–16 television season. It also had an average total 18-49 rating of 1.4, which was 88th.

=== Critical response ===
The review aggregator website Rotten Tomatoes reported a 76% approval rating with an average rating of 7.96/10 based on 21 reviews. The website's consensus reads, "A move from New York to Hollywood gives Agent Carter new territory to explore, as the series continues to search for a storyline as dynamic as its heroine." Variety's Brian Lowry was less positive, praising the casting and performances but saying, "Agent Carter feels too slavishly locked into the S.H.I.E.L.D. formula...it's sort of a shame Agent Carter isn't more compelling, since the impeccable period trappings and costumes make the series a nice change of pace, at least visually."

Eric Goldman of IGN gave the season an 8.3 out of 10, praising Atwell's performance, as well as the return of Dottie in the season and the additions of Ana Jarvis and Whitney Frost. Conversely, he felt Reggie Austin as Jason Wilkes was likable, but ultimately the "character felt a bit bland" and that the humor in the season was pushed "a bit too far". He concluded, "I don't think [the season] was quite as tightly-constructed as Season 1 and tonally, it sometimes wrestled with finding the right balance between the cool spy-action elements and the likable comedic aspect... But overall, it was another fun season filled with compelling characters—including a strong villain—and 1940s, Marvel-flavored spy heroics, which benefitted from the new visuals the Los Angeles setting gave it." Molly Freeman, reviewing the season finale for Screen Rant, called the season as a whole "Excellent", particularly praising the character development given to the character of Whitney Frost, but criticized the way that the season ended that character's storyline, stating that the finale "does a disservice to all the character development of Whitney throughout season 2....for the sake of sweeping her aside as easily as possible and giving the other cast members more development and screen time. After watching Agent Carter develop Whitney as such a powerful and sympathetic villain earlier this season, the way the show wrapped up her storyline is a disappointment." Bob Chipman, in a review of the whole season for the same website, disagreed, calling the season "consistently disappointing" and "a letdown" compared to the previous season.

=== Accolades ===
For the season, the series was nominated for Best Superhero Adaptation Series at the 42nd Saturn Awards.
