= The Edge of Mystery =

- Agent Carter episode
- Episode no.: Season 2 Episode 8
- Directed by: Metin Hüseyin
- Written by: Brant Englestein
- Cinematography by: Edward J. Pei
- Editing by: Christopher Cooke
- Original air date: February 23, 2016
- Running time: 42 minutes

Guest appearances
- Wynn Everett as Whitney Frost; Reggie Austin as Jason Wilkes; Lotte Verbeek as Ana Jarvis; Lesley Boone as Rose Roberts; Rey Valentin as Vega; Kurtwood Smith as Vernon Masters; Brian Glanney as Ford; Ken Marino as Joseph Manfredi; Tina D'Marco as Nonna Manfredi; Matt Braunger as Aloysius Samberly; Tom T. Choi as Chung

Episode chronology
← Previous "Monsters"	Next → "A Little Song and Dance"
- Agent Carter season 2

"The Edge of Mystery" is the eighth episode of the second season of the American television series Agent Carter, inspired by the films Captain America: The First Avenger and Captain America: The Winter Soldier, and the Marvel One-Shot short film also titled Agent Carter. It features the Marvel Comics character Peggy Carter trying to defeat Whitney Frost, and is set in the Marvel Cinematic Universe (MCU), sharing continuity with the films of the franchise. The episode was written by Brant Englestein and directed by Metin Hüseyin.

Hayley Atwell reprises her role as Carter from the film series, and is joined by regular cast members James D'Arcy, Chad Michael Murray, and Enver Gjokaj.

"The Edge of Mystery" originally aired on ABC on February 23, 2016, and according to Nielsen Media Research, was watched by 2.50 million viewers.

== Plot ==
The installment opens with a flash-back to 1946, replaying Peggy Carter’s first telephone call to Edwin Jarvis about diffusing a Nitramene bomb, now shown from inside the Jarvis household where Ana worries that Peggy's dangerous life may follow them to California.

In 1947 Los Angeles, Ana lies unconscious in hospital after being shot, leaving Jarvis despondent while Peggy juggles comforting him with planning their next move against Whitney Frost. Jason Wilkes meanwhile awakens shackled in Frost's improvised laboratory; she urges him to embrace the “voice” of Zero Matter, insisting the substance is a gift rather than a curse.

Peggy and SSR Chief Daniel Sousa trace Frost through her new ally Joseph Manfredi, staging a tense pasta-laced parley in Manfredi's restaurant that secures an agreement to trade uranium rods for Wilkes’ release. Back at Howard Stark’s mansion, SSR scientist Aloysius Samberly fabricates dummy rods and decodes Stark's blueprints for a “gamma cannon,” a pulse weapon designed to collapse Zero Matter rifts.

Jarvis, distraught after learning Ana will never be able to have children, insists on joining the mission despite Peggy's misgivings. Their convoy is interrupted by Jack Thompson, who brandishes a redacted file implicating Peggy in wartime misconduct before being used as a pawn by Vernon Masters’ memory-inhibitor, leaving him confused about his own scheme.

The desert exchange unravels when Frost detects the counterfeit uranium. She opens a dimensional rift that selects Wilkes—rather than herself—as its conduit; he is pulled skywards and infused with pure Zero Matter before the gamma cannon seals the breach and hurls him back to Earth. Jarvis, acting on vengeance, shoots Frost, but the wound heals instantly. Frost's men overpower the team, knocking Peggy and Jarvis unconscious and loading them into a truck bound for an unknown location, ending the episode on a cliff-hanger.

== Production ==
=== Development ===
In February 2016, Marvel announced that the eighth episode of the season would be titled "The Edge of Mystery", to be written by Brant Englestein, with Metin Hüseyin directing.

=== Casting ===
In February 2016, Marvel revealed that main cast members Hayley Atwell, James D'Arcy, Enver Gjokaj, Wynn Everett, Reggie Austin, and Chad Michael Murray would star as Peggy Carter, Edwin Jarvis, Daniel Sousa, Whitney Frost, Jason Wilkes, and Jack Thompson, respectively. It was also revealed that the guest cast for the episode would include Lotte Verbeek as Ana Jarvis, Lesley Boone as Rose Roberts, Rey Valentin as Agent Vega, Kurtwood Smith as Vernon Masters, Brian Glanney as Agent Ford, Ken Marino as Joseph Manfredi, Tina D'Marco as Nonna Manfredi, Matt Braunger as Dr. Aloysius Samberly, Tom T. Choi as Doctor Chung, Russell Edge as Agent Blackwell, Tim Brown as snub-nose and Damian O'Hare as Nick Driscoll. Edge, Brown, and O'Hare did not receive guest star credit in the episode, while Everett and Austin received guest star credit instead of regular starring. Verbeek, Boone, Valentin, Smith, Marino, Braunger, and Choi reprise their roles from earlier in the series.

== Release ==
"The Edge of Mystery" was first aired in the United States on ABC on February 23, 2016. The episode debuted on Hulu on November 29, 2017, after it acquired the exclusive streaming rights to the series, and was made available on Disney+ at launch, on November 12, 2019, along with the rest of the series.

== Reception ==
=== Ratings ===
In the United States, the episode received a 0.8/2 percent share among adults between the ages of 18 and 49, meaning that it was seen by 0.8 percent of all households and 2 percent of all of those watching television at the time of the broadcast. It was watched by 2.50 million viewers.
