= Monsters (Agent Carter) =

- Agent Carter episode
- Episode no.: Season 2 Episode 7
- Directed by: Metin Hüseyin
- Written by: Brandon Easton
- Cinematography by: Edward J. Pei
- Editing by: Mark Hartzell
- Original air date: February 16, 2016
- Running time: 42 minutes

Guest appearances
- Bridget Regan as Dottie Underwood; Wynn Everett as Whitney Frost; Reggie Austin as Jason Wilkes; Lotte Verbeek as Ana Jarvis; Tom T. Choi as Chung; Ken Marino as Joseph Manfredi; Kurtwood Smith as Vernon Masters

Episode chronology
← Previous "Life of the Party"	Next → "The Edge of Mystery"
- Agent Carter season 2

"Monsters" is the seventh episode of the second season of the American television series Agent Carter, inspired by the films Captain America: The First Avenger and Captain America: The Winter Soldier, and the Marvel One-Shot short film also titled Agent Carter. It features the Marvel Comics character Peggy Carter the growing threat of Whitney Frost, and is set in the Marvel Cinematic Universe (MCU), sharing continuity with the films of the franchise. The episode was written by Brandon Easton and directed by Metin Hüseyin.

Hayley Atwell reprises her role as Carter from the film series, and is joined by regular cast members James D'Arcy, Chad Michael Murray, and Enver Gjokaj.

"Monsters" originally aired on ABC on February 16, 2016, and according to Nielsen Media Research, was watched by 2.39 million viewers.

== Plot ==
Whitney Frost and the Council cover up her murder of Calvin Chadwick and the other Council members, and Frost makes Joseph Manfredi her second-in-command. With the help of Edwin Jarvis's wife Ana Jarvis, Jason Wilkes uses the Zero Matter and containment chamber to restore his physical form, though he knows he cannot leave the chamber for long. Vernon Masters tries to interrogate Dottie Underwood, before Frost reassigns him to finding the uranium that Peggy Carter and company stole from the Roxxon Corporation bombs. Frost interrogates Underwood herself, using her abilities, and learns that Carter wanted the Zero Matter because of Wilkes and his condition. Frost sets a trap, luring Carter and Jarvis away from Wilkes. Masters attempts to get Daniel Sousa to cooperate in retrieving the uranium. When he refuses, Masters has men attack him at home, forcing Sousa to take leave. Masters takes over the Los Angeles office of the Strategic Scientific Reserve (SSR). Frost and Manfredi kidnap Wilkes, with Frost hoping to help and study him. To slow down Carter's pursuit of them, Frost shoots Ana. While Carter and Jarvis are focused on saving Ana, Underwood escapes.

== Production ==
=== Development ===
In February 2016, Marvel announced that the seventh episode of the season would be titled "Monsters", to be written by Brandon Easton, with Metin Hüseyin directing.

=== Casting ===
In February 2016, Marvel revealed that main cast members Hayley Atwell, James D'Arcy, Enver Gjokaj, Wynn Everett, Reggie Austin, and Chad Michael Murray would star as Peggy Carter, Edwin Jarvis, Daniel Sousa, Whitney Frost, Jason Wilkes, and Jack Thompson respectively. It was also revealed that the guest cast for the episode would include Lotte Verbeek as Ana Jarvis, Bridget Regan as Dottie Underwood, Christopher Allen as Agent Ryan, Kurtwood Smith as Vernon Masters, Ken Marino as Joseph Manfredi, Arielle McFadden as nurse, Tom T. Choi as Doctor Chung and Myles Grier as man. Allen, McFadden, and Grier did not receive guest star credit in the episode, while Everett and Austin received guest star credit instead of regular starring. Verbeek, Regan, Smith and Marino reprise their roles from earlier in the series.

== Release ==
"Monsters" was first aired in the United States on ABC on February 16, 2016. The episode debuted on Hulu on November 29, 2017, after it acquired the exclusive streaming rights to the series, and was made available on Disney+ at launch, on November 12, 2019, along with the rest of the series.

== Reception ==
=== Ratings ===
In the United States the episode received a 0.7/2 percent share among adults between the ages of 18 and 49, meaning that it was seen by 0.7 percent of all households, and 2 percent of all of those watching television at the time of the broadcast. It was watched by 2.39 million viewers.
