= A View in the Dark =

- Agent Carter episode
- Episode no.: Season 2 Episode 2
- Directed by: Lawrence Trilling
- Written by: Eric Pearson; Lindsey Allen
- Cinematography by: Edward J. Pei
- Editing by: Christopher Cooke
- Original air date: January 19, 2016
- Running time: 43 minutes

Guest appearances
- Wynn Everett as Whitney Frost; Reggie Austin as Jason Wilkes; Currie Graham as Calvin Chadwick; Ray Wise as Hugh Jones; Chris Browning as Rufus Hunt; Sarah Bolger as Violet; Lotte Verbeek as Ana Jarvis; Lesley Boone as Rose Roberts; Casey Sander as Thomas Gloucester

Episode chronology
← Previous "The Lady in the Lake"	Next → "Better Angels"
- Agent Carter season 2

"A View in the Dark" is the second episode of the second season of the American television series Agent Carter, inspired by the films Captain America: The First Avenger and Captain America: The Winter Soldier, and the Marvel One-Shot short film also titled Agent Carter. It features the Marvel Comics character Peggy Carter as she learns of the newly discovered Zero Matter, and is set in the Marvel Cinematic Universe (MCU), sharing continuity with the films of the franchise. The episode was written by Eric Pearson & Lindsey Allen and directed by Lawrence Trilling.

Hayley Atwell reprises her role as Carter from the film series, and is joined by regular cast members James D'Arcy and Enver Gjokaj.

"A View in the Dark" originally aired on ABC on January 19, 2016, and according to Nielsen Media Research, was watched by 3.18 million viewers.

== Plot ==
Calvin Chadwick meets with the secretive Council of Nine, who shut down his Zero Matter program due to its seeming lack of results, and want him to focus on his senatorial ambitions. Chadwick informs his wife Whitney Frost, who is the true brains behind the program while struggling with her acting due to sexism in Hollywood. Jason Wilkes meets with Peggy Carter to help with her investigation, though he is hesitant to turn on Isodyne as it was the only company willing to hire him as a black man. Wilkes explains that Isodyne had attempted to replicate the success of the Manhattan Project and in doing so, had discovered Zero Matter. The frozen woman must have come into physical contact with it, though its effects are not limited to that. Carter and Wilkes agree to steal the Zero Matter, and at Isodyne, find agents of the Council destroying the program. Wilkes manages to get to the Zero Matter, but is confronted by Frost, who is there to steal it herself. The two are exposed to the Zero Matter in the ensuing scuffle, leaving Wilkes missing and Frost having absorbed Zero Matter.

== Production ==
=== Development ===
In January 2016, Marvel announced that the second episode of the season would be titled "A View in the Dark", to be written by Eric Pearson & Lindsey Allen, with Lawrence Trilling directing.

=== Casting ===
In January 2016, Marvel revealed that main cast members Hayley Atwell, James D'Arcy, Enver Gjokaj, Wynn Everett, Reggie Austin, and Chad Michael Murray would star as Peggy Carter, Edwin Jarvis, Daniel Sousa, Whitney Frost, Jason Wilkes, and Jack Thompson, respectively. It was also revealed that the guest cast for the episode would include Currie Graham as Calvin Chadwick, Lotte Verbeek as Ana Jarvis, Lesley Boone as Rose Roberts, Sarah Bolger as Violet, Angela Cristantello as receptionist, Carl Crudup as Frank, Chris Browning as Rufus Hunt, Nick Hoffa as restaurant owner, Robert Buscemi as concierge, Ray Wise as Hugh Jones, Brian Glanney as Agent Ford, Patrick Quinlan as EMT and Kirby Lauryen as singer. Cristantello, Crudup, Hoffa, Buscemi, Glanney, Quinlan, and Lauryen did not receive guest star credit in the episode, while Everett and Austin received guest star credit instead of regular starring and Murray did not ultimately appear. Casey Sander also guest starred as Thomas Gloucester. Graham, Verbeek, Boone, Bolger, Cristantello, and Wise reprise their roles from earlier in the series.

== Release ==
"A View in the Dark" was first aired in the United States on ABC on January 19, 2016. The episode debuted on Hulu on November 29, 2017, after it acquired the exclusive streaming rights to the series, and was made available on Disney+ at launch, on November 12, 2019, along with the rest of the series.

== Reception ==
=== Ratings ===
In the United States the episode received a 0.9/3 percent share among adults between the ages of 18 and 49, meaning that it was seen by 0.9 percent of all households, and 3 percent of all of those watching television at the time of the broadcast. It was watched by 3.18 million viewers.

=== Critical response ===
Eric Goldman of IGN refers to the Whitney as "a compelling character" and cites strong chemistry between Atwell and Austin. He particularly admires the ending, which he contrasts with the season's so far "farcical" tone. Amy Ratcliffe of Nerdist says the show's principal character is "as fabulous and kick-ass as ever" and applauds the addition of Ana Jarvis.
