= Hollywood Ending (Agent Carter) =

- Agent Carter episode
- Episode no.: Season 2 Episode 10
- Directed by: Jennifer Getzinger
- Story by: Chris Dingess
- Teleplay by: Michele Fazekas; Tara Butters
- Cinematography by: Edward J. Pei
- Editing by: Mark Hartzell
- Original air date: March 1, 2016
- Running time: 42 minutes

Guest appearances
- Dominic Cooper as Howard Stark; Wynn Everett as Whitney Frost; Reggie Austin as Jason Wilkes; Currie Graham as Calvin Chadwick; Lotte Verbeek as Ana Jarvis; Lesley Boone as Rose Roberts; Matt Braunger as Aloysius Samberly; Tina D'Marco as Nonna Manfredi; Ken Marino as Joseph Manfredi

Episode chronology
← Previous "A Little Song and Dance"	Next → —
- Agent Carter season 2

"Hollywood Ending" is the tenth episode of the second season, and premature series finale, of the American television series Agent Carter, inspired by the films Captain America: The First Avenger and Captain America: The Winter Soldier, and the Marvel One-Shot short film also titled Agent Carter. It features the Marvel Comics character Peggy Carter trying to defeat Whitney Frost, and is set in the Marvel Cinematic Universe (MCU), sharing continuity with the films of the franchise. The episode was written by Michelle Fazekas and Tara Butters and directed by Jennifer Getzinger.

Hayley Atwell reprises her role as Carter from the film series, and is joined by regular cast members James D'Arcy, Chad Michael Murray, and Enver Gjokaj.

"Hollywood Ending" originally aired on ABC on March 1, 2016, and according to Nielsen Media Research, was watched by 2.35 million viewers.

== Plot ==
Whitney Frost absorbs the Zero Matter released from Jason Wilkes, who is rescued by Peggy Carter, as Howard Stark returns and aids in their escape. Jack Thompson finds in Vernon Masters's possession a supposedly incriminating file on Carter and a secret Council of Nine key. Joseph Manfredi becomes concerned with Frost's behavior, and her new obsession with opening another rift, this time with a machine of her own design. He meets with Stark—an old friend of his—and the others, and agrees to distract Frost while Carter and Daniel Sousa photograph the blueprints for Frost's machine, which Stark and Wilkes build themselves. They open a new rift, and Frost is drawn to it. They use the gamma cannon to knock the Zero Matter from her, into the other dimension; Frost is left insane from her time controlled by the Zero Matter, and is placed in a mental asylum. Thompson gives the secret key to Carter, who is convinced to stay in Los Angeles to be with Sousa. Thompson prepares to return to New York City, but is shot in his hotel room; the shooter takes the file on Carter.

== Production ==
=== Development ===
In February 2016, Marvel announced that the tenth episode of the season would be titled "Hollywood Ending", to be written by executive producers Michele Fazekas and Tara Butters, based on a story by executive producer Chris Dingess, with Jennifer Getzinger directing.

=== Casting ===
In February 2016, Marvel revealed that main cast members Hayley Atwell, James D'Arcy, Enver Gjokaj, Wynn Everett, Reggie Austin, and Chad Michael Murray would star as Peggy Carter, Edwin Jarvis, Daniel Sousa, Whitney Frost, Jason Wilkes, and Jack Thompson, respectively. It was also revealed that the guest cast for the episode would include Currie Graham as Calvin Chadwick, Lotte Verbeek as Ana Jarvis, Lesley Boone as Rose Roberts, Dominic Cooper as Howard Stark, Ken Marino as Joseph Manfredi, Chris Coppola as Hank, Tina D'Marco as Nonna Manfredi, Matt Braunger as Dr. Aloysius Samberly and Malcolm Brock Jones as orderly. Coppola and Jones did not receive guest star credit in the episode, while Everett and Austin received guest star credit instead of regular starring. Graham, Verbeek, Boone, Cooper, Marino, D'Marco, and Braunger reprise their roles from earlier in the series.

== Release ==
"Hollywood Ending" was first aired in the United States on ABC on March 1, 2016. The episode debuted on Hulu on November 29, 2017, after it acquired the exclusive streaming rights to the series, and was made available on Disney+ at launch, on November 12, 2019, along with the rest of the series.

== Reception ==
=== Ratings ===
In the United States the episode received a 0.7/2 percent share among adults between the ages of 18 and 49, meaning that it was seen by 0.7 percent of all households, and 2 percent of all of those watching television at the time of the broadcast. It was watched by 2.35 million viewers.
