= A Little Song and Dance =

- Agent Carter episode
- Episode no.: Season 2 Episode 9
- Directed by: Jennifer Getzinger
- Story by: Michele Fazekas; Tara Butters
- Teleplay by: Chris Dingess
- Cinematography by: Edward J. Pei
- Editing by: Andrew Doerfer
- Original air date: February 23, 2016
- Running time: 45 minutes

Guest appearances
- Lyndsy Fonseca as Angie Martinelli; Bridget Regan as Dottie Underwood; Wynn Everett as Whitney Frost; Reggie Austin as Jason Wilkes; Max Brown as Michael Carter; Lotte Verbeek as Ana Jarvis; Lesley Boone as Rose Roberts; Matt Braunger as Aloysius Samberly; Ken Marino as Joseph Manfredi; Kurtwood Smith as Vernon Masters; Rey Valentin as Vega

Episode chronology
← Previous "The Edge of Mystery"	Next → "Hollywood Ending"
- Agent Carter season 2

"A Little Song and Dance" is the ninth episode of the second season of the American television series Agent Carter, inspired by the films Captain America: The First Avenger and Captain America: The Winter Soldier, and the Marvel One-Shot short film also titled Agent Carter. It features the Marvel Comics character Peggy Carter trying to defeat Whitney Frost, and is set in the Marvel Cinematic Universe (MCU), sharing continuity with the films of the franchise. The episode was written by Chris Dingess and directed by Jennifer Getzinger.

Hayley Atwell reprises her role as Carter from the film series, and is joined by regular cast members James D'Arcy, Chad Michael Murray, and Enver Gjokaj.

"A Little Song and Dance" originally aired on ABC on February 23, 2016, and according to Nielsen Media Research, was watched by 2.50 million viewers.

== Plot ==
The episode opens in Peggy Carter’s subconscious, where a monochrome back-lot morphs into a lavish 1940s musical number featuring Edwin Jarvis, Daniel Sousa and an apparition of Angie Martinelli, each goading Peggy to choose between her rival suitors. Jarvis and Peggy awaken inside a truck bound for Whitney Frost’s hide-out; after short-circuiting their chains they flee into the Mojave Desert, where simmering blame over Ana Jarvis’ injuries erupts until Jarvis confesses that his wife can no longer bear children. Within the Strategic Scientific Reserve, Chief Jack Thompson secretly rewires Howard Stark’s gamma cannon into a remote-detonated bomb that he intends to trade to Frost in exchange for a seat on the Council of Nine, while Vernon Masters manoeuvres for control of the agency. In a downtown waste-management plant, Frost straps Jason Wilkes to an operating table and attempts to siphon Zero Matter from his body, unaware that the substance is destabilising.

Peggy’s team regroups at Stark’s mansion, where Aloysius Samberly fashions a signal jammer to neutralise Thompson’s trigger. The ensuing siege at Frost’s facility devolves into overlapping betrayals: Thompson offers Masters and the bomb to Frost; Peggy cuts the detonator circuit; and Wilkes, overwhelmed by Zero Matter, seals himself in the containment chamber. In the closing moments Wilkes explodes outward, his body fracturing as a shock wave of dark energy engulfs the room, leaving Peggy, Sousa and Frost staring into an expanding void.

== Production ==
=== Development ===
In February 2016, Marvel announced that the ninth episode of the season would be titled "A Little Song and Dance", to be written by executive producer Chris Dingess, based on a story by executive producers Michele Fazekas and Tara Butters, with Jennifer Getzinger directing.

=== Casting ===
In December 2015, Lyndsy Fonseca was revealed to be reprising her season one role of Angie Martinelli for a dream sequence in this episode. The musical sequence, dubbed an informal crossover with Dancing with the Stars, features many of the professional dancers from that series, including Louis van Amstel, Dmitry Chaplin, Karina Smirnoff, Anna Trebunskaya, Sasha Farber, and Damian Whitewood. Dancers Robert Roldan, Malene Ostergaard, Amanda Balen, Serge Onik, Jenya Shatilova, Lacey Escabar, Alla Kocherga, and Paul Kirkland are also featured in the sequence.

In February 2016, Marvel revealed that main cast members Hayley Atwell, James D'Arcy, Enver Gjokaj, Wynn Everett, Reggie Austin, and Chad Michael Murray would star as Peggy Carter, Edwin Jarvis, Daniel Sousa, Whitney Frost, Jason Wilkes, and Jack Thompson, respectively. It was also revealed that the guest cast for the episode would include Lotte Verbeek as Ana Jarvis, Lesley Boone as Rose Roberts, Bridget Regan as Dottie Underwood, Rey Valentin as Agent Vega, Kurtwood Smith as Vernon Masters, Ken Marino as Joseph Manfredi, Matt Braunger as Dr. Aloysius Samberly, Max Brown as Michael Carter, Tim Soergel as Paul, Bert Rotundo as Ralph, Lon Gowan as truck driver and Russell Edge as Agent Blackwell. Soergel, Rotundo, Gowan and Edge did not receive guest star credit in the episode, while Everett and Austin received guest star credit instead of regular starring. Verbeek, Boone, Regan, Valentin, Smith, Marino, Braunger, and Brown reprise their roles from earlier in the series.

=== Design ===
The dream sequence was choreographed by van Amstel and begins in black and white, before transitioning to color.

=== Music ===
The dance number used in the dream sequence was an original song from lyricist David Zippel and series composer Christopher Lennertz, in conjunction with Butters and Fazekas. Titled "Whatcha Gonna Do (It's Up to You)", the single was performed by Atwell and Gjokaj along with the Hollywood Studio Symphony, and was released on iTunes on March 18, 2016.

== Release ==
"A Little Song and Dance" was first aired in the United States on ABC on February 23, 2016. The episode debuted on Hulu on November 29, 2017, after it acquired the exclusive streaming rights to the series, and was made available on Disney+ at launch, on November 12, 2019, along with the rest of the series.

== Reception ==
=== Ratings ===
In the United States the episode received a 0.8/2 percent share among adults between the ages of 18 and 49, meaning that it was seen by 0.8 percent of all households, and 2 percent of all of those watching television at the time of the broadcast. It was watched by 2.50 million viewers.
