= The Atomic Job =

- Agent Carter episode
- Episode no.: Season 2 Episode 5
- Directed by: Craig Zisk
- Written by: Lindsey Allen
- Cinematography by: Edward J. Pei
- Editing by: Christopher Cooke
- Original air date: February 9, 2016
- Running time: 42 minutes

Guest appearances
- Wynn Everett as Whitney Frost; Reggie Austin as Jason Wilkes; Currie Graham as Calvin Chadwick; Lesley Boone as Rose Roberts; Sarah Bolger as Violet; Christopher Allen as Ryan; Rey Valentin as Vega; Alexandra Vino as bombshell secretary; Ken Marino as Joseph Manfredi; Jimmy Ambrose as Jerry; Matt Braunger as Aloysius Samberly; Ray Wise as Hugh Jones

Episode chronology
← Previous "Smoke & Mirrors"	Next → "Life of the Party"
- Agent Carter season 2

"The Atomic Job" is the fifth episode of the second season of the American television series Agent Carter, inspired by the films Captain America: The First Avenger and Captain America: The Winter Soldier, and the Marvel One-Shot short film also titled Agent Carter. It features the Marvel Comics character Peggy Carter as she tries to steal an atomic bomb, and is set in the Marvel Cinematic Universe (MCU), sharing continuity with the films of the franchise. The episode was written by Lindsey Allen and directed by Craig Zisk.

Hayley Atwell reprises her role as Carter from the film series, and is joined by regular cast members James D'Arcy, Chad Michael Murray, and Enver Gjokaj.

"The Atomic Job" originally aired on ABC on February 9, 2016, and according to Nielsen Media Research, was watched by 2.66 million viewers.

== Plot ==
Jason Wilkes becomes drawn to the Zero Matter in a sample of Jane Scott's body. After absorbing that small amount, Wilkes temporarily regains his physical body and discovers the location of Scott's. Peggy Carter and Edwin Jarvis attempt to steal Scott's body, hoping that the rest of the Zero Matter within it will restore Wilkes permanently, but arrive to see Whitney Frost taking the Zero Matter for herself, before convincing Calvin Chadwick to help her steal an atomic bomb from the Council of Nine so she can replicate the original discovery of Zero Matter. They seek help from Frost's ex-boyfriend Joseph Manfredi, a crime lord, who gives them men for the job in exchange for Chadwick's influence in the media. Carter, Jarvis, Daniel Sousa, and some Strategic Scientific Reserve (SSR) allies break into the Roxxon facility holding the bombs and disable them before Frost can reach them. Carter confronts Frost, but she escapes when Carter is impaled on a rebar. Sousa accidentally reveals to his new fiancée that he loves Carter, and while Wilkes comforts Carter as she recuperates, his form begins to fade away.

== Production ==
=== Development ===
In January 2016, Marvel announced that the fifth episode of the season would be titled "The Atomic Job", to be written by Lindsey Allen, with Craig Zisk directing.

=== Casting ===
In January 2016, Marvel revealed that main cast members Hayley Atwell, James D'Arcy, Enver Gjokaj, Wynn Everett, Reggie Austin, and Chad Michael Murray would star as Peggy Carter, Edwin Jarvis, Daniel Sousa, Whitney Frost, Jason Wilkes, and Jack Thompson, respectively. It was also revealed that the guest cast for the episode would include Currie Graham as Calvin Chadwick, Lesley Boone as Rose Roberts, Sarah Bolger as Violet, Christopher Allen as Agent Ryan, Rey Valentin as Agent Vega, Alexandra Vino as bombshell secretary, Ken Marino as Joseph Manfredi, Jimmy Ambrose as Jerry, Matt Braunger as Dr. Aloysius Samberly and Ray Wise as Hugh Jones. Everett and Austin received guest star credit instead of regular starring. Graham, Boone, Bolger, Valentin, Braunger, and Wise reprise their roles from earlier in the series.

== Release ==
"The Atomic Job" was first aired in the United States on ABC on February 9, 2016. The episode debuted on Hulu on November 29, 2017, after it acquired the exclusive streaming rights to the series, and was made available on Disney+ at launch, on November 12, 2019, along with the rest of the series.

== Reception ==
=== Ratings ===
In the United States the episode received a 0.8/2 percent share among adults between the ages of 18 and 49, meaning that it was seen by 0.8 percent of all households, and 2 percent of all of those watching television at the time of the broadcast. It was watched by 2.66 million viewers.
