= Smoke & Mirrors (Agent Carter) =

- Agent Carter episode
- Episode no.: Season 2 Episode 4
- Directed by: David Platt
- Written by: Sue Chung
- Cinematography by: Edward J. Pei
- Editing by: Mark Hartzell
- Original air date: February 2, 2016
- Running time: 42 minutes

Guest appearances
- Wynn Everett as Whitney Frost; Reggie Austin as Jason Wilkes; Currie Graham as Calvin Chadwick; Chris Browning as Rufus Hunt; Max Brown as Michael Carter; Samaire Armstrong as Wilma Cully; Chris Mulkey as Bud Schultz; Christopher Grove as Edwards; Kevin Changaris as Fred Wells; Kurtwood Smith as Vernon Masters; Rey Valentin as Vega; Carole Ruggier as Amanda Carter

Episode chronology
| ← Previous "Better Angels" | Next → "The Atomic Job" |
- Agent Carter season 2

"Smoke & Mirrors" is the fourth episode of the second season of the American television series Agent Carter, inspired by the films Captain America: The First Avenger and Captain America: The Winter Soldier, and the Marvel One-Shot short film also titled Agent Carter. It features the Marvel Comics character Peggy Carter, and juxtaposes her history with that of Whitney Frost. The episode is set in the Marvel Cinematic Universe (MCU), sharing continuity with the films of the franchise. The episode was written by Sue Chung and directed by David Platt.

Hayley Atwell reprises her role as Carter from the film series, and is joined by regular cast members James D'Arcy, Chad Michael Murray, and Enver Gjokaj.

"Smoke & Mirrors" originally aired on ABC on February 2, 2016, and according to Nielsen Media Research, was watched by 2.77 million viewers.

== Plot ==
In the 1920s, in Broxton, Oklahoma, Agnes Cully (who would later become Whitney Frost) is shown to have a brilliant mind, fixing a broken radio, inventing devices, and applying to a science program at the University of Oklahoma, but is rejected due to her gender. Cully's mother doesn't care for her brilliance and tells her looks are all that matter. In 1934, Cully travels to Hollywood, where she is approached by a talent agent, promising to make her a star. In 1940 in England, Peggy Carter, who is engaged, receives an offer to join the Special Operations Executive due to her work at Bletchley Park as a code breaker; she eventually accepts the offer and leaves her fiancé after her brother Michael's death in the war. In 1947, Carter and Edwin Jarvis kidnap Rufus Hunt in an attempt to learn more about the Council of Nine. After getting names of members of the council and locations of transcripts of their meetings, Carter and Daniel Sousa prepare the Strategic Scientific Reserve (SSR) to infiltrate the Arena Club, but are stopped by Vernon Masters. They let a bugged Hunt escape, and he attempts to blackmail Calvin Chadwick in exchange for protection. Displeased with the mess he was causing, Frost absorbs Hunt, revealing her abilities to Chadwick.

== Production ==
=== Development ===
In January 2016, Marvel announced that the fourth episode of the season would be titled "Smoke & Mirrors", to be written by Sue Chung, with David Platt directing.

=== Casting ===
In January 2016, Marvel revealed that main cast members Hayley Atwell, James D'Arcy, Enver Gjokaj, Wynn Everett, Reggie Austin, and Chad Michael Murray would star as Peggy Carter, Edwin Jarvis, Daniel Sousa, Whitney Frost, Jason Wilkes, and Jack Thompson, respectively. It was also revealed that the guest cast for the episode would include Currie Graham as Calvin Chadwick, Kurtwood Smith as Vernon Masters, Chris Browning as Rufus Hunt, Carole Ruggier as Amanda Carter, Gabriella Graves as young Peggy Carter, Webb Baker Hayes as young Michael Carter, Ivy George as young Agnes Cully, Olivia Welch as teen Agnes Cully, Samaire Armstrong as Wilma Cully, Chris Mulkey as Uncle Bud Schultz, Max Brown as Michael Carter, Christopher Grove as Mr. Edwards, Catriona Toop as Bletchley girl #1, Jennifer Neala Page as Bletchley girl #2, Kevin Changaris as Fred Wells, Jonathan Lavallee as FBI Agent, Andrew Carter as Ned Silver, Khalilah Joi as ticket lady and Tamika Katon-Donegal as Mabel. Ruggier, Graves, Hayes, George, Welch, Toop, Page, Lavallee, Carter, Joi, and Katon-Donegal did not receive guest star credit in the episode, while Everett and Austin received guest star credit instead of regular starring. Graham, Smith, and Browning reprise their roles from earlier in the series.

== Release ==
"Smoke & Mirrors" was first aired in the United States on ABC on February 2, 2016. The episode debuted on Hulu on November 29, 2017, after it acquired the exclusive streaming rights to the series, and was made available on Disney+ at launch, on November 12, 2019, along with the rest of the series.

== Reception ==
=== Ratings ===
In the United States the episode received a 0.8/2 percent share among adults between the ages of 18 and 49, meaning that it was seen by 0.8 percent of all households, and 2 percent of all of those watching television at the time of the broadcast. It was watched by 2.77 million viewers.
