= Life of the Party (Agent Carter) =

- Agent Carter episode
- Episode no.: Season 2 Episode 6
- Directed by: Craig Zisk
- Written by: Eric Pearson
- Cinematography by: Edward J. Pei
- Editing by: Andrew Doerfer
- Original air date: February 16, 2016
- Running time: 42 minutes

Guest appearances
- Bridget Regan as Dottie Underwood; Wynn Everett as Whitney Frost; Reggie Austin as Jason Wilkes; Currie Graham as Calvin Chadwick; Lotte Verbeek as Ana Jarvis; Ray Wise as Hugh Jones; Casey Sander as Thomas Gloucester; Kurtwood Smith as Vernon Masters; John Kerry as Mortimer Hayes

Episode chronology
← Previous "The Atomic Job"	Next → "Monsters"
- Agent Carter season 2

"Life of the Party" is the sixth episode of the second season of the American television series Agent Carter, inspired by the films Captain America: The First Avenger and Captain America: The Winter Soldier, and the Marvel One-Shot short film also titled Agent Carter. It features the Marvel Comics character Peggy Carter teaming up with former adversary Dottie Underwood, and is set in the Marvel Cinematic Universe (MCU), sharing continuity with the films of the franchise. The episode was written by Eric Pearson and directed by Craig Zisk.

Hayley Atwell reprises her role as Carter from the film series, and is joined by regular cast members James D'Arcy, Chad Michael Murray, and Enver Gjokaj.

"Life of the Party" originally aired on ABC on February 16, 2016, and according to Nielsen Media Research, was watched by 2.39 million viewers.

== Plot ==
Jason Wilkes returns to the real world but worries that at any moment he could be drawn away completely. He designs a containment chamber for himself, but requires more Zero Matter. Peggy Carter realizes that Whitney Frost is now the only source of Zero Matter, but is still too injured to get it herself. Instead, she breaks Dottie Underwood out of custody and sends her with Edwin Jarvis to one of Calvin Chadwick's campaign events. The event is also cover for a Council of Nine meeting, Chadwick having convinced them to see Frost (they usually never speak with outsiders, let alone women). Vernon Masters and Jack Thompson are also at the event; Jarvis distracts Thompson while Underwood collects a Zero Matter sample from Frost using a device designed by Wilkes. Daniel Sousa tells Carter that his fiancée left him due to his supposed feelings for her. Underwood eavesdrops on the Council meeting, watching as Chadwick betrays Frost and has her restrained. Showing greatly enhanced powers, Frost kills Chadwick and several of the Council members, proclaiming herself in control of the remainder. Masters and Thompson capture Underwood, but the Zero Matter sample is left behind. Masters insists that Thompson "destroy" Carter; he tries to convince her to return to New York City, but fails. Underwood ends up in Frost's control.

== Production ==
=== Development ===
In February 2016, Marvel announced that the sixth episode of the season would be titled "Life of the Party", to be written by Eric Pearson, with Craig Zisk directing.

=== Casting ===
In February 2016, Marvel revealed that main cast members Hayley Atwell, James D'Arcy, Enver Gjokaj, Wynn Everett, Reggie Austin, and Chad Michael Murray would star as Peggy Carter, Edwin Jarvis, Daniel Sousa, Whitney Frost, Jason Wilkes, and Jack Thompson, respectively. It was also revealed that the guest cast for the episode would include Currie Graham as Calvin Chadwick, Lotte Verbeek as Ana Jarvis, Bridget Regan as Dottie Underwood, Kurtwood Smith as Vernon Masters, Josh Latzer as guard, Hayley McCarthy as Melody, John Kerry as Mortimer Hayes, Ray Wise as Hugh Jones and Casey Sander as Thomas Gloucester. Latzer, McCarthy, and Kerry did not receive guest star credit in the episode, while Everett and Austin received guest star credit instead of regular starring. Graham, Verbeek, Regan, Smith, Wise, and Sander reprise their roles from earlier in the series.

== Release ==
"Life of the Party" was first aired in the United States on ABC on February 16, 2016. The episode debuted on Hulu on November 29, 2017, after it acquired the exclusive streaming rights to the series, and was made available on Disney+ at launch, on November 12, 2019, along with the rest of the series.

== Reception ==
=== Ratings ===
In the United States the episode received a 0.7/2 percent share among adults between the ages of 18 and 49, meaning that it was seen by 0.7 percent of all households, and 2 percent of all of those watching television at the time of the broadcast. It was watched by 2.39 million viewers.
