= The Lady in the Lake (Agent Carter) =

- Agent Carter episode
- Episode no.: Season 2 Episode 1
- Directed by: Lawrence Trilling
- Written by: Brant Englestein
- Cinematography by: Edward J. Pei
- Editing by: Mark Hartzell
- Original air date: January 19, 2016
- Running time: 42 minutes

Guest appearances
- Bridget Regan as Dottie Underwood; Wynn Everett as Whitney Frost; Reggie Austin as Jason Wilkes; Currie Graham as Calvin Chadwick; Lotte Verbeek as Ana Jarvis; Sarah Bolger as Violet; Sean O'Bryan as Andrew Henry; Lesley Boone as Rose Roberts; Matt Braunger as Samberly; Kurtwood Smith as Vernon Masters

Episode chronology
← Previous "Valediction"	Next → "A View in the Dark"
- Agent Carter season 2

"The Lady in the Lake" is the first episode of the second season of the American television series Agent Carter, inspired by the films Captain America: The First Avenger and Captain America: The Winter Soldier, and the Marvel One-Shot short film also titled Agent Carter. It features the Marvel Comics character Peggy Carter as she travels to Los Angeles to assist with a strange new case, and is set in the Marvel Cinematic Universe (MCU), sharing continuity with the films of the franchise. The episode was written by Brant Englestein and directed by Lawrence Trilling.

Hayley Atwell reprises her role as Carter from the film series, and is joined by regular cast members James D'Arcy, Chad Michael Murray, and Enver Gjokaj.

"The Lady in the Lake" originally aired on ABC on January 19, 2016, and according to Nielsen Media Research, was watched by 3.18 million viewers.

== Plot ==
In 1947 New York City, Chief Jack Thompson and Agent Peggy Carter of the Strategic Scientific Reserve (SSR) apprehend Soviet spy Dottie Underwood. Newly appointed Chief Daniel Sousa of the Los Angeles SSR office meets with Detective Andrew Henry, who has discovered a woman's body in a frozen lake during a heat wave. Sousa, doubting his inexperienced agents, asks Thompson for backup; he sends Carter. An autopsy shows that the body glows in the dark, likely caused by Isodyne Energy's particle accelerator. Carter learns from Isodyne scientist Jason Wilkes that the woman, physicist Jane Scott, had an affair with Isodyne owner and prospective senator Calvin Chadwick. Underwood is taken into FBI custody, with Thompson's mentor Vernon Masters warning him of greater forces than the SSR that may affect his future. Henry attempts to kill Wilkes, but is killed himself by a police officer; Henry and the officer were hired to cover up the murder by Chadwick and his actress wife Whitney Frost following the former's affair.

== Production ==
=== Development ===
On May 7, 2015, ABC officially renewed Agent Carter for a second season. In January 2016, Marvel announced that the first episode of the season would be titled "The Lady in the Lake", to be written by Brant Englestein, with Lawrence Trilling directing.

=== Casting ===
In January 2016, Marvel revealed that main cast members Hayley Atwell, James D'Arcy, Enver Gjokaj, Wynn Everett, Reggie Austin, and Chad Michael Murray would star as Peggy Carter, Edwin Jarvis, Daniel Sousa, Whitney Frost, Jason Wilkes, and Jack Thompson, respectively. It was also revealed that the guest cast for the episode would include Currie Graham as Calvin Chadwick, Lotte Verbeek as Ana Jarvis, Lesley Boone as Rose Roberts, Sarah Bolger as Violet, Bridget Regan as Dottie Underwood, Sean O'Bryan as Detective Andrew Henry, John Gilbert as elderly teller, Kurtwood Smith as Vernon Masters, Edward Deraney as SSR agent #1, Kevin Ashworth as Agent Fisher, Angela Cristantello as receptionist, Bruce Katzman as medical examiner, Alex Alcheh as rookie cop, Matt Braunger as SSR lab tech Samberly and Jonathan Lavallee as commanding officer. Gilbert, Deraney, Ashworth, Cristantello, Katzman, Alcheh, and Lavallee did not receive guest star credit in the episode, while Everett and Austin received guest star credit instead of regular starring. Boone and Regan reprise their roles from earlier in the series.

== Release ==
"The Lady in the Lake" was first aired in the United States on ABC on January 19, 2016. The episode debuted on Hulu on November 29, 2017, after it acquired the exclusive streaming rights to the series, and was made available on Disney+ at launch, on November 12, 2019, along with the rest of the series.

== Reception ==
=== Ratings ===
In the United States the episode received a 0.9/3 percent share among adults between the ages of 18 and 49, meaning that it was seen by 0.9 percent of all households, and 3 percent of all of those watching television at the time of the broadcast. It was watched by 3.18 million viewers.
