= Better Angels (Agent Carter) =

- Agent Carter episode
- Episode no.: Season 2 Episode 3
- Directed by: David Platt
- Written by: Jose Molina
- Cinematography by: Edward J. Pei
- Editing by: Andrew Doerfer
- Original air date: January 26, 2016
- Running time: 42 minutes

Guest appearances
- Dominic Cooper as Howard Stark; Wynn Everett as Whitney Frost; Reggie Austin as Jason Wilkes; Currie Graham as Calvin Chadwick; Chris Browning as Rufus Hunt; John Balma as Torrance; Kurtwood Smith as Vernon Masters; Randy Sklar as Kenneth; Rey Valentin as Vega; Walker Roach as "Kid Colt" actor

Episode chronology
← Previous "A View in the Dark"	Next → "Smoke & Mirrors"
- Agent Carter season 2

"Better Angels" is the third episode of the second season of the American television series Agent Carter, inspired by the films Captain America: The First Avenger and Captain America: The Winter Soldier, and the Marvel One-Shot short film also titled Agent Carter. It features the Marvel Comics character Peggy Carter as she falls deeper into a strange conspiracy, and is set in the Marvel Cinematic Universe (MCU), sharing continuity with the films of the franchise. The episode was written by Jose Molina and directed by David Platt.

Hayley Atwell reprises her role as Carter from the film series, and is joined by regular cast members James D'Arcy, Chad Michael Murray, and Enver Gjokaj.

"Better Angels" originally aired on ABC on January 26, 2016, and according to Nielsen Media Research, was watched by 2.90 million viewers.

== Plot ==
At Whitney Frost's behest, her husband Calvin Chadwick frames Jason Wilkes as a communist spy who had infiltrated Isodyne and destroyed the facility. Jack Thompson comes to Los Angeles to "clean-up" the situation at the invitation of Vernon Masters, sending Peggy Carter back to New York City where she enlists the help of Howard Stark to investigate the Arena Club—whose membership pin was borne by the Council agents—but is unable to prove that the Council has blackmailed Chadwick's senatorial competitor into dropping out of the race. Carter "misses" her flight, and after unsuccessfully confronting Frost, is attacked by Council hitman Rufus Hunt, barely fending him off. Investigating a gravitational anomaly around Carter, Stark discovers Wilkes is alive but temporarily invisible and non-corporeal, and goes in search of his mentor for help in restoring Wilkes' body. Frost absorbs her film director with newly discovered Zero Matter abilities, and Masters introduces Thompson to Chadwick to celebrate the latter's now guaranteed-senatorship, convincing Thompson that Carter was right.

== Production ==
=== Development ===
In January 2016, Marvel announced that the third episode of the season would be titled "Better Angels", to be written by Jose Molina, with David Platt directing.

=== Casting ===
In January 2016, Marvel revealed that main cast members Hayley Atwell, James D'Arcy, Enver Gjokaj, Wynn Everett, Reggie Austin, and Chad Michael Murray would star as Peggy Carter, Edwin Jarvis, Daniel Sousa, Whitney Frost, Jason Wilkes, and Jack Thompson, respectively. It was also revealed that the guest cast for the episode would include Currie Graham as Calvin Chadwick, Dominic Cooper as Howard Stark, Kurtwood Smith as Vernon Masters, Chris Browning as Rufus Hunt, Randy Sklar as Kenneth, Walter Roach as rawhide kid, Clayton Norcross as sheriff, Rey Valentin as Agent Vega, Hope Lauren as gorgeous blonde, John Balma as Torrance and Chris Harrison as massive guard. Sklar, Roach, Norcross, Valentin, Lauren, and Harrison did not receive guest star credit in the episode, while Everett and Austin received guest star credit instead of regular starring. Graham, Cooper, Smith, and Browning reprise their roles from earlier in the series.

== Release ==
"Better Angels" was first aired in the United States on ABC on January 26, 2016. The episode debuted on Hulu on November 29, 2017, after it acquired the exclusive streaming rights to the series, and was made available on Disney+ at launch, on November 12, 2019, along with the rest of the series.

== Reception ==
=== Ratings ===
In the United States the episode received a 0.9/3 percent share among adults between the ages of 18 and 49, meaning that it was seen by 0.9 percent of all households, and 3 percent of all of those watching television at the time of the broadcast. It was watched by 2.90 million viewers.
