= Flutter (2011 film) =

- Directed by: Giles Borg
- Written by: Stephen Leslie
- Produced by: David Dickson; Sarah Boote; Joe Jenckes; Alan Latham
- Starring: Joe Anderson; Laura Fraser; Luke Evans; Max Brown; Anton Lesser
- Cinematography: Christopher Ross
- Edited by: Guy Bensley
- Production companies: Flutter; Bow Street Films; Silver Reel; Sunrise Films
- Release date: 5 October 2011 (Raindance Film Festival)
- Running time: 86 minutes
- Country: United Kingdom
- Language: English
- Budget: £3 million

Flutter is a 2011 British black comedy film about sports gambling, written by Stephen Leslie and directed by Giles Borg. The film stars Joe Anderson, Ricky Tomlinson, Laura Fraser, Billy Zane, Anna Anissimova and Mark Williams.

== Cast ==
- Joe Anderson as John
- Anna Anissimova Schafer as Stan
- Laura Fraser as Helen
- Luke Evans as Adrian
- Max Brown as Wagner
- Anton Lesser as Bruno
- Billy Zane as Edwin "The Dentist"
- Mark Williams as Raymond
- Ricky Tomlinson
- Autumn Federici as Nancy
- Richard Reid as Winston
- John Raine as Terry

== Production ==
As of February 2010, Park Entertainment begun principal photography in filming northeast England, and began shopping the title to buyers in Berlin. Filming was completed in six weeks.
