= Max Brown (British actor) =

British actor

- Born: 1980 or 1981 (age 45–46)
- Occupation: Actor
- Years active: 2001–present
- Spouses: Pollyanna Rose (m. 2005; div. 2008) Annabelle Horsey (m. 2012)
- Children: 3

Max Brown (born 1980 or 1981) is a British actor who made his television debut in 2001 at the age of 20. He is best known for his role as Edward Seymour in the television series The Tudors.

== Early life ==
Brown spent most of his childhood in the town of Shrewsbury, Shropshire. He has two sisters, Chloe and Phoebe. Brown's father is a civil servant and his mother a governor at a family support charity. Brown was drawn to acting from an early age after moving schools at a young age. He performed in plays regularly at the local Music Hall in Shrewsbury.

== Career ==
Brown first appeared on screens playing the heartthrob Danny Hartston in Grange Hill (2001). He has gone on to appear in several television shows, including Crossroads, Hollyoaks, Doctors, Casualty, Mistresses and The Tudors. In 2010, he was cast as MI5 Piracy and Terrorism Case Officer Dimitri Levendis in the BBC One drama series Spooks until its final season in 2011. He originated the role of Adam Wainwright in Foyle's War, but the role needed to be re-cast when Brown moved to the United States. Brown also played Evan Marks in the first eighteen episodes of the first season of The CW's Beauty and the Beast.

Brown has appeared in films including Turistas (released as Paradise Lost in the UK) and Daylight Robbery. In 2011, he played the role of Wagner in the British independent comedy film Flutter.

He also appeared in the last two seasons of the television series The Royals as Prince Robert who later becomes King. In 2019, he was cast in the Downton Abbey film as the King's Valet, Richard Ellis, and a romantic interest of Thomas Barrow.

== Personal life ==
Brown married his first wife Pollyanna Rose in 2005.

Four years after his divorce from his first wife, Brown married Annabelle Horsey, a model, and together they have three children: two daughters and a son.

== Filmography ==
Film
Year	Title	Role	Notes
2002	Fallen Angels	Brad	
2006	Turistas	Liam	
2006	True True Lie	Chad	
2008	Daylight Robbery	Doctor	
2009	Act of God	Richard Short	
2011	Flutter	Wagner	
2012	Departure Date	Kyle	
2012	Motorcycle Sweden	Corto	Short film
2012	Love Tomorrow	Dominic	
2017	That Good Night	Michael	
2019	Downton Abbey	Richard Ellis	

Television
Year	Title	Role	Notes
2001–2002	Grange Hill	Danny Hartston	Main cast (series 24–25); 36 episodes
2001–2002	Crossroads	Mark Russell	Main cast
2002–2004	Hollyoaks	Kristian Hargreaves	Main cast
2005	Down to Earth	Leon	Episode: "Tall Tales"
2005	Doctors	Kenny Parks	Episode: "Is There a Doctor in the House?"
2005	Casualty	Simon Broughton	Episode: "Brief Encounters"
2006	Heartbeat	Pete Grimshaw	Episode: "Give Peace a Chance"
2008	Mistresses	Sam Grey	Main cast (series 1); 6 episodes
2008–2010	The Tudors	Edward Seymour	Main cast (series 2–4); 21 episodes
2010	Foyle's War	Adam Wainwright	3 episodes
2010–2011	Spooks	Dimitri LevendIs	Main cast (series 9–10); 14 episodes
2012–2013, 2016	Beauty & the Beast	Evan Marks	Main cast (season 1); 18 episodes, Guest star (season 4) It's a Wonderful Beast
2015	Sleepy Hollow	Orion	Episode: "Paradise Lost"
2015	You, Me and the Apocalypse	Dr Samuel	3 episodes
2016	Agent Carter	Michael Carter	2 episodes: "Smoke & Mirrors", "A Little Song and Dance"
2016–2018	The Royals	King Robert	Main cast (Season 3–4)
2022–present	Sister Boniface Mysteries	DI Sam Gillespie	Main cast
2025	Casualty	Henry Somerville	Episode: "Jodie"
