= Myles Grier =

Nigerian-American actor

- Education: Valdosta State University
- Occupations: Actor, producer
- Years active: 2003–present

Myles Grier is a Nigerian American film, television, and stage actor. He was born in Atlanta, Georgia, United States.

== Career ==
Grier has acted in FOX's Lethal Weapon, NBC's Game of Silence, Freeform's The Fosters, NBC's Aquarius, ABC's Agent Carter ("Monsters") and Beerfest: Thirst For Victory, CW Seed's first original film. He was part of the creative team who went viral for their innovative theatrical experience of The Lion King the musical, in which he produced and voiced young and adult Simba on the social audio app Clubhouse.

== Awards ==
Grier received a Best Male Performance award from England's Studio 7 International Film Festival and the Denzel Washington Award from HYP Film Festival in 2021 for his performance in the short film Remember to Breathe in the Dark.
