= Game of Silence (American TV series) =

- Genre: Crime drama; Thriller
- Created by: Pınar Bulut
- Based on: Suskunlar by Pınar Bulut
- Developed by: David Hudgins
- Starring: David Lyons; Michael Raymond-James; Larenz Tate; Bre Blair; Conor O'Farrell; Deidrie Henry; Demetrius Grosse; Claire van der Boom
- Composer: John Debney
- Country of origin: United States
- Original language: English
- No. of seasons: 1
- No. of episodes: 10

Production
- Executive producers: David Hudgins; Carol Mendelsohn; Julie Weitz; Niels Arden Oplev; Timur Savcı; Tariq Jalil; Deran Sarafian
- Producer: Jean Higgins
- Cinematography: Eric Kress; Christopher Baffa
- Editors: Timothy A. Good; Rich Fox; John Wesley Whitton
- Camera setup: Single-camera
- Production companies: David Hudgins Productions; Carol Mendelsohn Productions; Universal Television; Sony Pictures Television

Original release
- Network: NBC
- Release: April 12 – June 5, 2016

Game of Silence is an American crime drama television series based on the Turkish series Suskunlar (English original title: Game of Silence) which is based on the true story of children who were sentenced in absentia to nine years in prison on the charge of stealing a baklava car in Gaziantep in 1997.

Timur Savcı, who was in the original series, is a producer of Game of Silence. Other producers are David Hudgins, Carol Mendelsohn, Julie Weitz, Niels Arden Oplev, and Tariq Jalil. The series premiered as a "preview" on April 12, 2016. It then debuted in its regular Thursday at 10:00 PM timeslot on April 14, 2016, and aired until June 5, 2016. On May 13, 2016, NBC cancelled the series after one season.

== Cast ==
- David Lyons as Jackson Brooks
  - Curran Walters as Young Jackson
- Michael Raymond-James as Gil Harris
  - Judah Lewis as Young Gil Harris
- Larenz Tate as Shawn Cook
  - McCarrie McCausland as Young Shawn
- Bre Blair as Jessie West
  - Katie Kelly as Young Jessie
- Conor O'Farrell as Warden Roy Carroll
- Deidrie Henry as Detective Liz Winters
- Demetrius Grosse as Terry Bosch
  - Myles Grier as Young Terry
- Claire van der Boom as Marina Nagle
- Derek Phillips as Gary "Boots" Nolan
  - Cannon Kluytman as Young Boots

== Episodes ==
| No. | Title | Directed by | Written by | Original release date | U.S. viewers (millions) |
|---|---|---|---|---|---|
| 1 | "Pilot" | Niels Arden Oplev | Teleplay by : David Hudgins | April 12, 2016 | 6.41 |
| 2 | "Blood Brothers" | Deran Sarafian | Wendy West | April 14, 2016 | 3.90 |
| 3 | "Hurricane Gil" | Dave Rodriquez | Christopher Fife | April 21, 2016 | 3.35 |
| 4 | "The Uninvited" | Kimberly Peirce | Tom Mularz | April 28, 2016 | 3.08 |
| 5 | "Ghosts of Quitman" | Bill Johnson | Ian Deitchman & Kristen Rusk Robinson | May 5, 2016 | 3.26 |
| 6 | "Into the Black" | Holly Dale | Jerome Hairston | May 12, 2016 | 3.26 |
| 7 | "Road Trip" | Peter Weller | Hayley Tyler | May 19, 2016 | 3.21 |
| 8 | "Hey" | Robert Mandel | Hiram Martinez | June 2, 2016 | 2.26 |
| 9 | "The Truth" | Brad Tanenbaum | Kurt Voelker | June 2, 2016 | 2.26 |
| 10 | "She Sang Hymns Out of Tune" | Deran Sarafian | David Hudgins | June 5, 2016 | 2.40 |

== Reception ==
On Metacritic, the series holds an average score of 58 (out of 100 points) based on 21 critics, indicating "mixed or average reviews". Review aggregator website Rotten Tomatoes reported that 11 of 19 critical responses were negative, averaging a 42% rating. The site's consensus reads: "Competent acting and a sufficiently intriguing premise aren't enough to make up for Game of Silence's unnecessarily convoluted, heavily clichéd storytelling."
