= Amanda Balen =

Canadian dancer and performer

Amanda Balen (born c. 1984) is a Canadian professional dancer.

== Early life ==
Balen grew up near Hamilton, Ontario with parents Mary and John Balen. She began dance classes at age three.

== Career ==
Balen moved to Los Angeles to pursue a dance career. There, she trained with American choreographer Mandy Moore, who featured Balen in the 2016 movie La La Land. She has also appeared on The Disney Channel, Glee, American Idol, The X-Factor, So You Think You Can Dance, Ellen, and The Oprah Winfrey Show.

In addition to her time in film, Balen has toured with multiple musical and artistic performers, including travelling with Lady Gaga for the Born This Way Ball and The Monster Ball Tour, as well as Celine Dion's Taking Chances World Tour. She has also worked with Janet Jackson, Britney Spears, Carrie Underwood, Pink, and Beyoncé. She performed in multiple Super Bowl halftime shows, including Katy Perry's performance in 2015 and Lady Gaga's performance in 2017.

In 2020, Balen co-directed the Dancing with the Stars live tour with the Season 28 cast.

From 2023 to 2024, she was the dance captain and associate choreographer for Taylor Swift's The Eras Tour, and featured in Taylor Swift: The Eras Tour, the tour's concert film. In 2025, she appeared once again in the follow-up film Taylor Swift: The Eras Tour: The Final Show as well as the accompanying behind-the-scenes docuseries The End of an Era.

== Filmography ==
| Year | Title | Role | Notes | Ref. |
|---|---|---|---|---|
| 2016 | Agent Carter, "A Little Song and Dance" | Dancer | | |
| 2020 | Dancing with the Stars | Co-director | | |
| 2023 | Taylor Swift: The Eras Tour | Dance captain | | |
| 2025 | Taylor Swift: The Eras Tour: The Final Show | Dance captain | | |
| 2025 | Taylor Swift: The End of an Era | Dance captain | | |
