= Brandon M. Easton =

American screenwriter

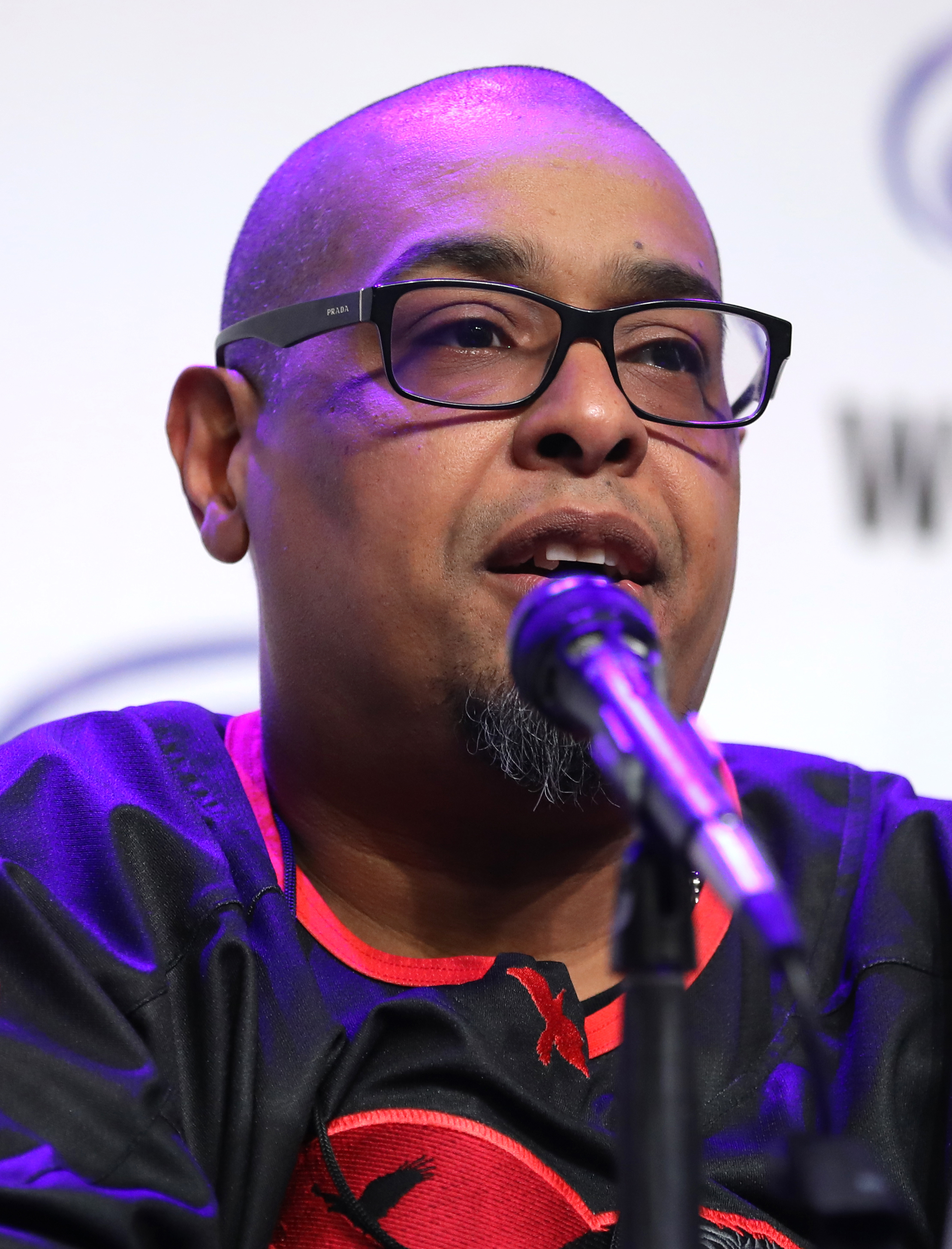
- Easton at the 2024 WonderCon
- Born: Baltimore, Maryland, U.S.
- Education: Ithaca College (BA); Boston University College of Communication (MFA); Lehman College
- Occupations: Writer; screenwriter; educator

Brandon M. Easton is a professional writer, screenwriter, and educator based in Los Angeles, California. Easton was born in Baltimore, Maryland and resides in Southern California. Easton is mainly known for his work on the Warner Bros. Animation reboot of the ThunderCats series as well as critical acclaim for his work in the comic book industry.

== Educational background ==
Easton earned a Bachelor of Arts in Sociology from Ithaca College in 1997, Masters of Fine Arts in Screenwriting from Boston University College of Communication in 2001 and Masters in Secondary Social Studies Education from the City University of New York-Herbert H. Lehman College in New York City in 2005. Easton often credits his time at Ithaca College as a “major transformative moment” in his life and says it gave birth to his writing voice and sociological perspectives.

Easton regularly writes and speaks on issues of race in the comic book industry, and has been published in various articles discussing racial barriers for writers of color. He is also a mentor to new comic book writers, and has a regular panel called "The Writer's Journey" where he and other colleagues discuss the secrets to breaking into show business.

== Writing and podcast career ==
Easton has written for the Boston Herald, Crashpad Magazine, and a variety of other publications, and taught as a public school teacher in the New York City public schools from 2003 to 2008. In 2008, Easton moved to Southern California to pursue writing, and since that time Easton has been writing for television and comics.

Easton has been named the writer of the international franchise Armarauders from Mecha Workshop as well as a guest writer for the new Watson and Holmes comic series published by New Paradigm Studios. In 2012, Easton signed a multi-graphic novel writing deal with LION FORGE COMICS, a new transmedia company based in St. Louis, Missouri and has authored multiple comic books, including "The Joshua Run,” "Roboy," and an upcoming biographical graphic novel about the life of pro-wrestler Andre the Giant. Easton's original graphic novel SHADOWLAW garnered coverage in publications/outlets like USA Today, Wired, Forbes and Ain't It Cool News.

== Brave new souls documentary ==
Easton is the producer, writer and director of Brave New: Black Sci-Fi and Fantasy Writers of the 21st Century - a documentary that addresses the issues of race and representation in the comic book industry, genre publishing and Hollywood. Easton interviewed new, but acclaimed, writers like Nnedi Okorafor, N. K. Jemisin, Geoffrey Thorne, Anthony Montgomery, Erika Alexander, Tony Puryear, Hannibal Tabu and several others.

== Awards ==
Easton is a recipient of the 2015 Disney-ABC Writing Program, a one year program that is considered to be one of the most successful writer programs in the entertainment industry.

Easton was a 2014 nominee for the Eisner Comic Industry Award for Best Single Issue or One Shot, which is considered the Comic Industry's equivalent of the Oscar Academy Awards. Easton also received three GLYPH awards in 2014 from the East Coast Black Age of Comics, including Fan Award (WATSON AND HOLMES #6), Story of the Year (WATSON AND HOLMES #6), and Best Writer (WATSON AND HOLMES #6). Easton is also the recipient of the 2013 Glyph recipient for Best Writer for his original graphic novel Shadowlaw.

Easton was also a semi-finalist with the Hollywood Black Film Festival's Project Stargazer in 2013 – collaboration with NASA to find and develop science-fiction writers of color.

== Film ==
- Takeover (2026)

== Television ==
- Thundercats (2012)
- Transformers: Rescue Bots (2014)
- Agent Carter (2016)
- Avengers Assemble (2018-2019)
- Transformers: War for Cybertron Trilogy (2020)
- Iyanu (2025-2026)

== Comics ==
=== 451 Media Group ===
- Bad Moon Rising #1-6 (2015-2016)

=== Arcana Studio ===
- Shadowlaw (2014)

=== Antarctic Press ===
- Miles Away (2013 GN)

=== DC Comics ===
- Truth & Justice - digital issues #4-6 (newsstand issue #2) [2021]

=== Dreamwave Productions ===
- Arkanium (2002)
- Transformers: Armada Free Comic Book Day (2003)

=== IDW Publishing ===
- André the Giant: Closer to Heaven (2015 GN)
- Hasbro Heroes Sourcebook #1-3 (2017)
- Jim Cornette Presents: Behind the Curtain - Real Pro Wrestling Stories (2019 GN)
- Judge Dredd 100-Page Giant (2020)
- Judge Dredd: False Witness (2020)
- M.A.S.K. #1-10 (2016-2017)
- Revolution: M.A.S.K. #1 (2016)
- Star Trek: Waypoint Special #1 (2018)
- Star Trek: Year Five #3-4 (2019)
- Transformers: Deviations (2016)
- Transformers: Unicron #3 (2018): M.A.S.K. backup story

=== Lionforge Comics ===
- Incidentals #10-19 (2018-2019)
- Roboy #1 - #6 (2013-2015)
- The Joshua Run #1 - #2 (2013)

=== Marvel Comics ===
- Civil War II: Choosing Sides #1 (2016)
- Marvel Action: Spider-Man #1-2 (2020)

=== Mecha Workshop ===
- Armarauders: The Last Battalion #1 (2015)

=== New Paradigm Studios ===
- Watson and Holmes vol.1 #6 (2013), vol.2 #1 (2016)

=== Stranger Comics ===
- Vampire Hunter D: Message from Mars (2016)
