= Eric Pearson =

American screenwriter

- Born: December 14, 1984 (age 41)
- Years active: 2010–present

Eric Pearson (born December 14, 1984) is an American screenwriter, best known for his work with Marvel Studios, writing various short films for their Marvel One-Shots series and the feature films Thor: Ragnarok (2017), Black Widow (2021), Thunderbolts* (2025) and The Fantastic Four: First Steps (2025).

He also contributed to the screenplays for Godzilla vs. Kong (2021) and Transformers One (2024).

== Early life and career ==
Pearson studied screenwriting at New York University's Tisch School of the Arts. He was enrolled in Marvel Studios' screenwriting program in 2010.

== Writing credits ==
Short film

- The Consultant (2011)
- A Funny Thing Happened on the Way to Thor's Hammer (2011)
- Item 47 (2012)
- Agent Carter (2013)

Television

| Year | Title | Notes |
|---|---|---|
| 2015–2016 | Agent Carter | 4 episodes; Also credited as story editor |

Feature film

| Year | Title | Director | Ref. |
|---|---|---|---|
| 2017 | Thor: Ragnarok | Taika Waititi | |
| 2021 | Godzilla vs. Kong | Adam Wingard | |
| 2021 | Black Widow | Cate Shortland | |
| 2024 | Transformers One | Josh Cooley | |
| 2025 | Thunderbolts* | Jake Schreier | |
| 2025 | The Fantastic Four: First Steps | Matt Shakman | |

Uncredited rewrites

- Ant-Man (2015)
- Spider-Man: Homecoming (2017)
- Pacific Rim: Uprising (2018)
- Avengers: Infinity War (2018)
- Avengers: Endgame (2019)
- Pokémon: Detective Pikachu (2019)

Additional Literary Material

- Ant-Man and the Wasp: Quantumania (2023)
- Avengers: Doomsday (2026)
