= Metin Hüseyin =

British film and television director

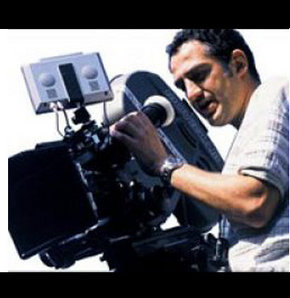
- Born: 1959 (age 66–67); Hackney, London, England
- Occupations: Film and television director
- Years active: 1990–present

Metin Hüseyin (born 1959) is a British television director of Turkish-Cypriot descent.

== Career ==
Hüseyin's debut film, Tight Trousers, was nominated for a BAFTA Film Award for Best Short Film in 1989. In 1998 he received a Royal Television Society Award and a British Academy Television Award nomination for Common as Muck, and The History of Tom Jones, a Foundling won three BAFTAs. In 2002, he directed the film Anita and Me.

Hüseyin has also directed episodes of various television series, including The All New Alexei Sayle Show, Randall and Hopkirk (Deceased), Kingdom, Merlin, Shameless, Outlander, and Krypton.

== Filmography ==
Director
Year	Film	Notes
1990	Tight Trousers	Short film
1991	Teenage Health Freak	TV series (6 episodes)
1994	The All New Alexei Sayle Show	TV series (12 episodes)
1995	Sorry About Last Night	TV movie
1994–1997	Common As Muck	TV series (9 episodes)
1997	The History of Tom Jones, a Foundling	TV mini-series (5 episodes)
1998	Norman Ormal: A Very Political Turtle	TV movie
2000	It Was an Accident	
2001	Randall & Hopkirk (Deceased)	TV series (3 episodes)
2002	Anita and Me	
2004	The Legend of the Tamworth Two	TV movie
2004	A Thing Called Love	TV series (2 episodes)
2005	Angell's Hell	TV movie
2005	Rose and Maloney	TV series (3 episodes)
2006	Mayo	TV series (3 episodes)
2006	Berry's Way	TV movie
2008	The Palace	TV series (4 episodes)
2008	The Invisibles	TV series (3 episodes)
2007–2009	Kingdom	TV series (5 episodes)
2009	All the Small Things	TV series (3 episodes)
2009	Merlin	TV series (3 episodes)
2011	Borgia	TV series (14 episodes)
2010–2011	Shameless	TV series (4 episodes)
2011	Lewis	TV series (1 episode)
2015–2016	Outlander	TV series (7 episodes)
2016	Agent Carter	TV series (2 episodes)
2017	Fortitude	TV series (2 episodes)
2017	Kevin (Probably) Saves the World	TV series (1 episode)
2018	Krypton	TV series (episode: "Transformation")
2019	Another Life	TV series (2 episodes)
2019	City on a Hill	TV series ( S01 E06 )
2021	American Gods	TV series ( S03 E09 "The Lake Effect" )
