= Rey Valentin =

American actor (born 1979)

Reynaldo Valentin (born February 3, 1979) is an American actor. He is best known for his roles in Generation Kill as Cpl. Gabe Garza, One Tree Hill as Nicholas "Nick" Chavez and in The Bedford Diaries as Chris Hernandez.

Valentin has appeared in the following films: Kill the Dog (2006), American Identity (2007) and Crossing Over (2008).

== Filmography ==
=== Film ===
Year	Title	Role	Notes
2009	Crossing Over	Javier Pedraza	Credited as "Reynaldo Valentin"
2009	The Jailhouse	Stark	
2010	Cherry (film)	Same Reyes	
2016	We Are Family	Cohen	

=== Television ===
Year	Title	Role	Notes
2006	That Guy	Oscar	TV film
2006	Law & Order	Freddie Colon	Episode: "Magnet"
2006	The Bedford Diaries	Chris Hernandez/Guy #1	5 episodes
2006	Numb3rs	ND SWAT	Episode: "The Mole"
2006	One Tree Hill	Nick Chavez	3 episodes
2007	CSI: NY	Julian Feeney	Episode: "A Daze of Wine and Roaches"
2008	Generation Kill	Cpl. Gabe Garza	TV min-series, 7 episodes
2008	NCIS	Dwayne Wilson	Episode: "Collateral Damage"
2009	CSI: Crime Scene Investigation	Elvis Rodriguez	Episode: "The Gone Dead Train"
2010	Human Target	Tony Sorrento	Episode: "Victoria"
2011	The Mentalist	Manny Flaco	Episode: "Bloodsport"
2012	Firelight	Caroline's Boyfriend	TV film
2012	Hart of Dixie	Pablo Charlton	Episode: "Destiny & Denial"
2013	Person of Interest	Jack Salazar	Episode: "Liberty"
2015	Supergirl	Ricardo	Episode: "Stronger Together"
2016	Agent Carter	Agent Vega	5 episodes
2018	Lucifer	Jay Lopez	Episode: "My Brother's Keeper"
