= Secret Empire (organization) =

Fictional comic book organization

The Secret Empire
- Leading members of the subversive organisation "the Secret Empire", from Tales to Astonish #81

Publication information
- Publisher: Marvel Comics
- First appearance: Tales to Astonish #81 (July 1966)
- Created by: Stan Lee (writer); Jack Kirby (artist)

In-story information
- Type of organization: Subversive

Roster

The Secret Empire is a fictional organization appearing in American comic books published by Marvel Comics. They first appeared in Tales to Astonish #81 and were created by Stan Lee and Jack Kirby. They were originally a branch of Hydra but later became a separate independent group.

They made their debut in the Marvel Cinematic Universe as a major antagonist in season 2 of Agent Carter. Under this incarnation, they are named the Council of Nine.

== Publication history ==
The Secret Empire first appeared in Tales to Astonish #81 and was created by Stan Lee and Jack Kirby.

== Fictional organization history ==
Secret Empire has been headed by a number of different leaders, always known as "Number One", with each iteration's goals following the desires of its current leader. The Secret Empire was founded by a scientist who felt like an anonymous nobody. The organization began as a criminal enterprise, a subsidiary of Hydra, which provided it with financial support. The Secret Empire served to distract the attention of authorities, such as S.H.I.E.L.D., from Hydra's activities, although the original Number One sought to break away from Hydra. The Secret Empire hires the mercenary Boomerang to steal plans for the Air Force's Orion Missile, but he is defeated by the Hulk. In attempting to blow up the Hulk, Number One instead kills himself.

Some time later, the organization regroups under a new Number One. This Secret Empire infiltrates the Brand Corporation in a bid to ruin Captain America's reputation, and kidnaps several mutants—Havok, Polaris, Beast, Iceman, Angel, Mastermind, Mesmero, Blob and Unus the Untouchable—to power a "flying saucer". Number One lands the saucer on the White House lawn and demands the government surrender control to him, or else he will detonate nukes in every major American city. The Secret Empire is defeated by Captain America, Cyclops, Falcon, and Marvel Girl, and Captain America pursues Number One into the White House. Rather than face capture, Number One unmasks himself, then commits suicide. The leader of the Secret Empire is revealed to be a high-ranking U.S. government official who had been attempting a coup d'état. Although his identity and face are never revealed to the reader, it is strongly implied in the dialogue that Number One was the President of the United States. The government covered up his guilt and suicide with the help of a double. This led to Captain America giving up his role for a while and taking on the role of Nomad. The story was first published in 1973, when the sitting president was Richard Nixon, embroiled at the time in the Watergate scandal. Writer Steve Englehart intended this issue as a metaphor of the Watergate case and the Nixon era.

The Secret Empire seeks to eliminate Moon Knight, who they believe had disrupted some of their operations. The real guilty party was Moon Knight's sidekick Midnight. When Moon Knight and Midnight confront the Secret Empire, Midnight is hit by an energy blast from the group's new leader, Number 7. Moon Knight abandons Midnight, believing him to be dead. In reality, Midnight survived, but was left disfigured. Number 7 orders Midnight to be transformed into a cyborg, implanting a mechanical failsafe that causes him to suffer intense pain if he disobeys Number 7.

During the Round Robin story arc in The Amazing Spider-Man, Midnight is sent to kidnap Nova so that the Secret Empire can transform him into a cyborg as well. The plan is foiled by Nova, Spider-Man, Moon Knight, the Punisher, and Night Thrasher. During the battle, the Secret Empire nurse assigned to provide repair work towards Midnight's robotic body parts disables Number 7's failsafe designed to prevent Midnight from gaining revenge against him for disfiguring him, allowing Midnight to kill Number 7 and assume control over the Secret Empire. However, along the way it was revealed that his nurse (and now lover), was also a cyborg. A loyal follower of the original founder (the original Number 1), she served as a prototype for the process used to transform Midnight into a cyborg. The realization that his lover was insane causes Midnight to aid his mentor and his allies against the nurse, ultimately sacrificing himself to destroy her.

The Secret Empire is involved in a conspiracy to divide up the empire of Wilson Fisk, who had lost control. The meeting took place in Las Vegas, under the cover of a Secret Empire "convention". Many Secret Empire members simply believe it is an organization like the Masons or the Elks, which was a perfect cover for criminal enterprises. The Punisher learns of the meeting, after which the Empire sends two hit squads to attack him. The first squad is killed, while the second group, a motorcycle gang called the "Praetorians", escape with heavy casualties. During the Dead Man's Hand crossover, the Punisher's allies Mickey Fondozzi and Microchip are captured while spying on Baron Strucker and claim to be Four and Eight, members of the Secret Empire. The Empire learn of this via a spy in the Hydra group. The Empire sends the Praetorians to kill everyone involved, but Fondozzi, Microchip, and Strucker survive.

== Membership ==
=== Current membership ===
- Calvin Burlingame - The father of Charcoal.
- Cheer Chadwick - A member of the Elite who has connections with the Secret Empire. She is the daughter of Hesperus Chadwick and niece of William Taurey.
- Hesperus Chadwick - A member of the Elite who has connections with the Secret Empire. He is the father of Cheer Chadwick and brother-in-law of William Taurey.
- Richard Cholmondely
- Thomas Gloucester - A British nobleman.
- Shocktroopers
- William Taurey - A member of the Elite who has connections with the Secret Empire. He is the uncle of Cheer Chadwick and the brother-in-law of Hesperus Chadwick.
- Harcourt Vickers

=== Former membership ===
- Boomerang
- Chainsaw
- Charcoal
- Lynn Church
- Cloud
- Doctor Faustus
- Linda Donaldson
- Mr. Farrell
- Gargantua
- Griffin
- Quentin Harderman - Head of the Committee to Regain America's Principles.
- Harridan
- Javelynn
- Mad Dog
- Carl Maddicks
- Midnight
- Moonstone
- Bo Ollsen
- Pretorians
- Professor Power
- Quasimodo
- Jay Sanford
- Seraph
- Thunderball
- Trickshot
- Tumbler
- Viper (Jordan Stryke)
- Viper (Madame Hydra)
- Martin Willis
- Wyre
- Zeitgeist

=== Other members ===
These members are either honorary or reserve members of the Secret Empire:

- Brute Force
  - Fieldstone
  - Fizgig
  - Hoarfrost
  - Hoopsnake
  - Ingot
  - Loblolly
  - Scarum
  - Watchfire
- Brotherhood of Mutants
  - Blob
  - Mastermind
  - Unus the Untouchable
- Mutant Force
  - Burner
  - Lifter
  - Peepers
  - Shocker
  - Slither
- Seekers
  - Chain
  - Grasp
  - Sonic

== In other media ==
- The Secret Empire appear in the Incredible Hulk segment of The Marvel Super Heroes.
- The Council of Nine, a group based on the Secret Empire, appears in Agent Carter. Known members include Hugh Jones, Calvin Chadwick, Thomas Gloucester, and Mortimer Hayes, with Vernon Masters as their associate. In the episode "Life of the Party", Whitney Frost kills Calvin Chadwick, Thomas Gloucester, and three other members of the Council, then takes control of the group.
