= Lesley Boone =

American actress

- Born: February 25, 1968 (age 58); Los Angeles, California, U.S.
- Occupations: Actress, producer
- Years active: 1989–present
- Spouse: Larry Teng (m. 2005; div. 2013)

Lesley Boone (born February 25, 1968) is an American actress and producer, best known for her roles as Marlene Gilbert on the Fox sitcom Babes (1990–1991), as Molly Hudson in the NBC comedy-drama Ed (2000–2004) and as Rose Roberts in the ABC action-adventure show Agent Carter (2015–2016) included in the Marvel Cinematic Universe.

== Personal life ==
Boone married producer/director Larry Teng in 2005; they met on the set of Ed. They divorced in 2013.

== Filmography ==
Film roles
Year	Title	Role	Notes
1994	City Slickers II: The Legend of Curly's Gold		
1995	Stuart Saves His Family	Jodie Smalley	
1998	I'll Be Home for Christmas	Marjorie	
2003	Family Jewels	Evelyn	
2016	Fences	Evangelist Preacher	minor role

Television roles
Year	Title	Role	Notes
1989	Hooperman		1 episode
1989	L.A. Law	Gretchen	1 episode
1989	Doogie Howser, M.D.	Yvette	1 episode
1990	Mr. Belvedere	Diana	1 episode
1989–1990	Growing Pains	Lesley Boone / Lesley / Girl	3 episodes
1990	Glory Days		1 episode
1990–1991	Babes	Marlene Gilbert	Main cast, 22 episodes
1991	Parker Lewis Can't Lose	Harriet Guzman	1 episode
1993	Danger Theatre	Julie Conklin	1 episode
1994	The Mommies	Shopper #1	1 episode
1995	Wings	Wendy	1 episode
1996	High Incident	Beth Hagar	4 episodes
2000–2004	Ed	Molly Hudson	Main cast, 83 episodes
2006	Medium	Sondra Banister	1 episode
2007	Higglytown Heroes	Dump Truck Driver Hero	Voice, 1 episode
2009	Desperate Housewives	Lucy Blackburn	2 episodes
2011	Medium	Justine Godrich	1 episode
2012	Hawaii Five-0	Madeline	1 episode
2015–2016	Agent Carter	Rose Roberts	Recurring cast, 10 episodes
2017	Kevin (Probably) Saves the World	Lucille	Recurring role
2017–2018	Grey's Anatomy	Judy Kemp	Recurring role
2020	The Good Doctor	Marta Cruz	1 episode
2022–2023	NCIS: Los Angeles	Nina Barnes	Recurring role
2025	The Pitt	Nurse Lena Handzo	Recurring role

== Awards and nominations ==
For TV performances
Year	Association	Category	Series	Result
2004	Online Film & Television Association Award	Best Actress in a New Comedy Series	Ed	Nominated
