= Lotte Verbeek =

Dutch actress, dancer and model (born 1982)

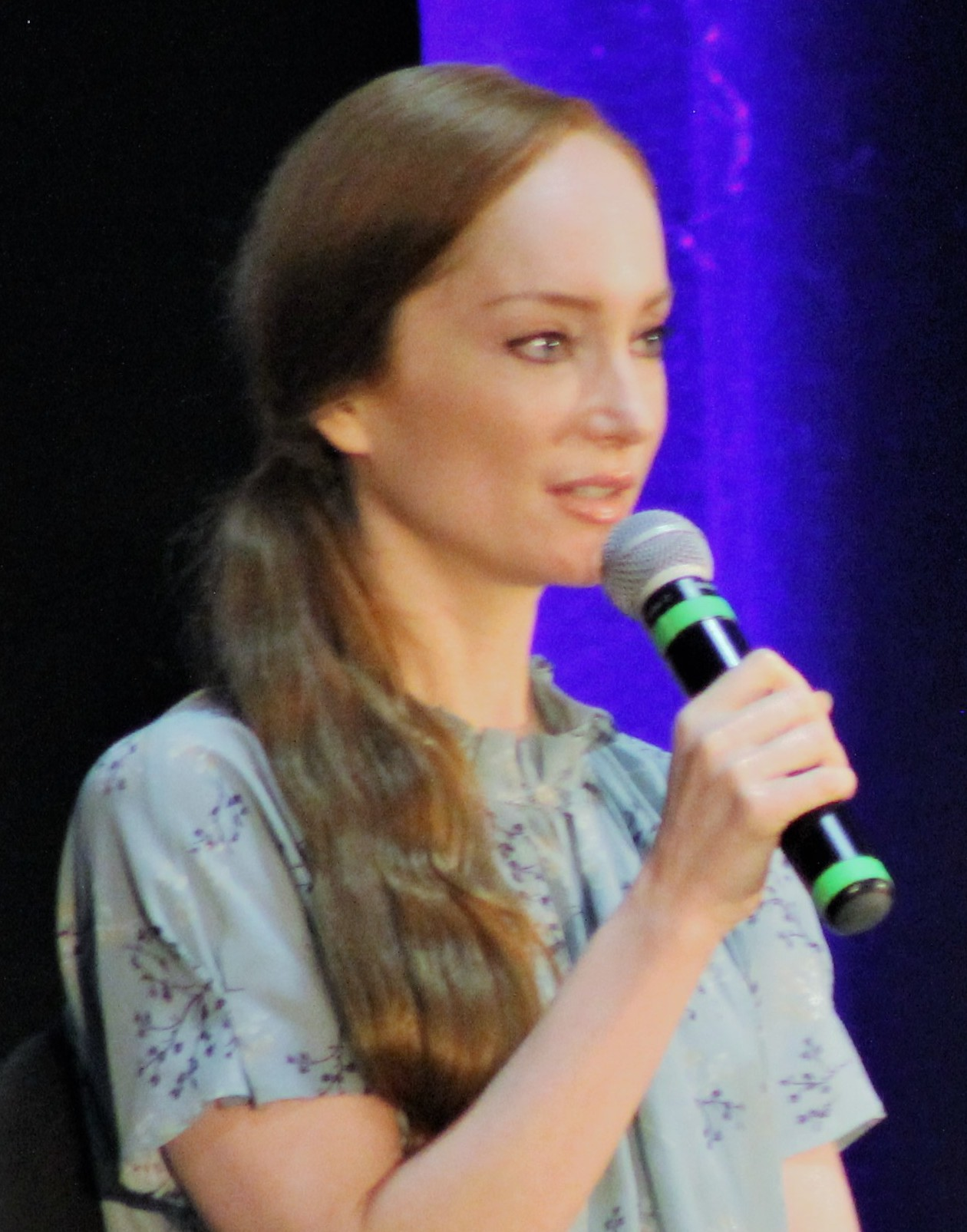
- Verbeek in 2018
- Born: 24 June 1982 (age 44); Venlo, Netherlands
- Occupations: Actress, dancer, model
- Years active: 2006–present

Lotte Verbeek (born 24 June 1982) is a Dutch actress, dancer and model. She is known for her role as Giulia Farnese in The Borgias television series created by Neil Jordan, and as Geillis Duncan in the Starz series Outlander.

Her film credits include The Last Witch Hunter (2015), The Fault in Our Stars (2014), The Book of Vision (2020), and Nuremberg (2025).

== Early life and education ==
Verbeek was born in Venlo, Netherlands. She was educated at Gymnasium Collegium Marianum in Venlo and graduated in 2008 at the Theaterschool in Amsterdam. From 1999, Verbeek attended the Dance Academy in Arnhem and the Amsterdam Academy of Jazz/Musical Theatre and Dance, where she graduated in 2006. She received singing lessons and attended voice workshops. During her studies, she worked as a dancer and model for photographer Erwin Olaf.

== Career ==
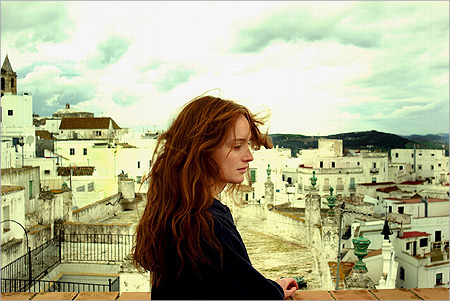
Verbeek in 2009's Nothing Personal

After completing high school, Verbeek started her acting career performing lead roles in Dutch movies such as Moes (2006) and LEFT (2007), in which she plays five double roles.

As a stage actress, Verbeek was in the production of Maria Magdalena by Wayne Traub, which toured Europe in 2009. She sings in the soprano vocal range. However, in Le Ragazze dello Swing, the songs are performed by The Blue Dolls.

In 2009, she won the Leopard for best actress at the Locarno International Film Festival for her role of Anne in Nothing Personal, a Dutch movie directed by Urszula Antoniak. For the same part she was also the recipient of the best actress award at the International Film Festival of Marrakech 2009 and was nominated as best actress for the Golden Calf at the Netherlands Film Festival.

In 2010, Verbeek received the Shooting Stars Award, the annual acting award for up-and-coming actors by European Film Promotion, at the Berlin International Film Festival. In the same year she was cast in Le Ragazze dello Swing (The Swing Girls), an award-winning Italian mini-series based on the Trio Lescano story. For her main role as Judith Leschan she received a Golden Nymph award for best actress alongside Andrea Osvart and Elise Schaap at Monte-Carlo Television Festival 2011.

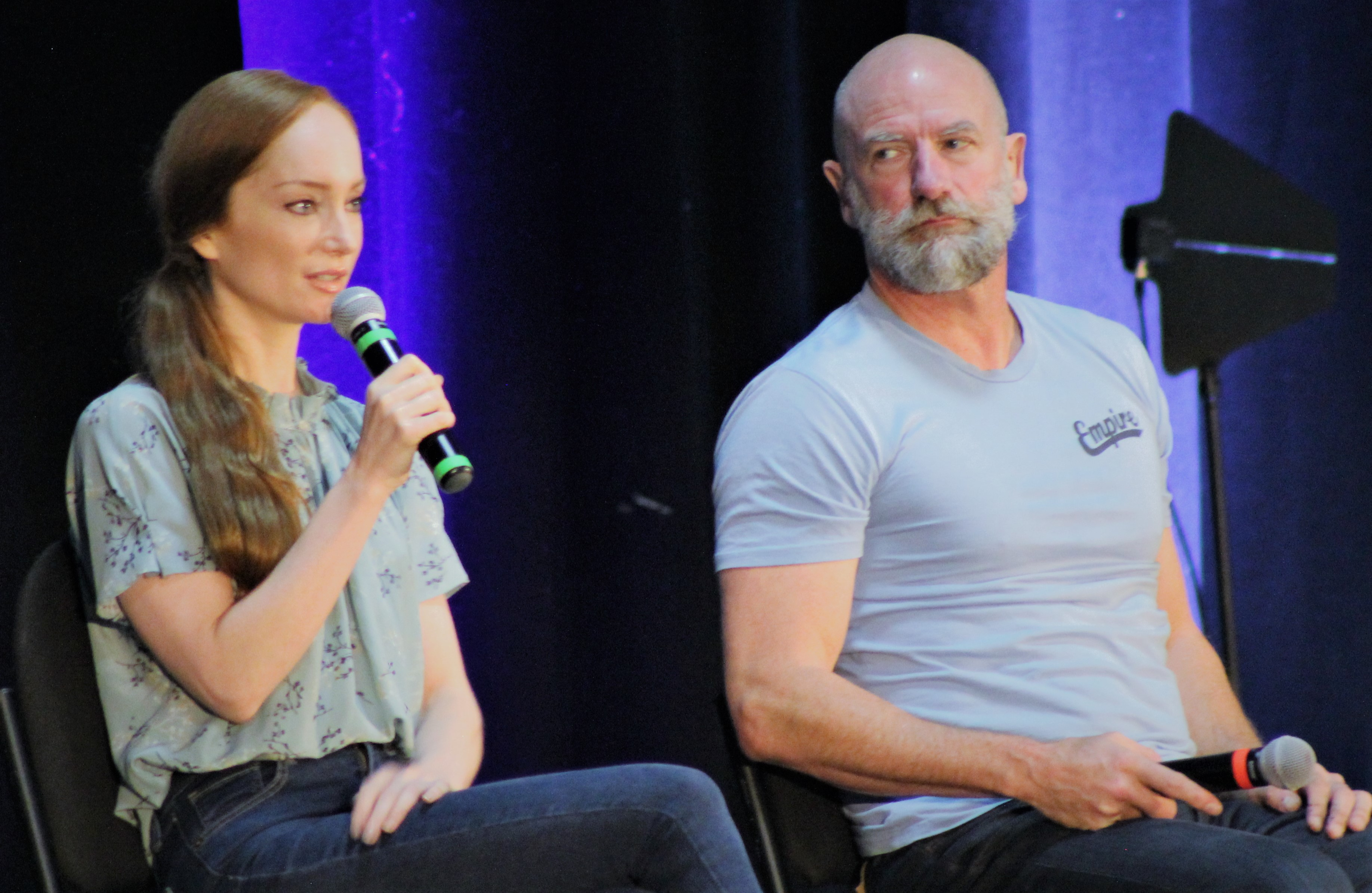
Verbeek (left) with Graham McTavish answering fan questions at a convention in August 2018.

From 2011 to 2013, she played Giulia Farnese in the Showtime period drama The Borgias, alongside Jeremy Irons in the role of Pope Alexander VI. The series was created by Neil Jordan and shot in Budapest.

In 2012, Verbeek played a double role of two twins Therese and Angelique in the erotic thriller Suspension of Disbelief, written and directed by Mike Figgis and screened at Rome Film Festival.

In 2014, she began playing Geillis Duncan in the Starz television drama Outlander and she was cast as Helena in the movie The Last Witch Hunter alongside Vin Diesel.

On 9 October 2015, it was announced at the New York Comic Con that Verbeek would play Ana Jarvis, wife of Edwin Jarvis, on season 2 of Agent Carter.

In 2016, she joined The Blacklist as Katarina Rostova. She appeared in seven episodes across seasons 3, 4, 6 and 8.

In 2025 Verbeek played in Nuremberg as Emmy Göring, with young German-Dutch actress Fleur Bremmer performing as her daughter Edda Göring.

== Filmography ==
| Year | Title | Role | Notes | Broadcaster |
|---|---|---|---|---|
| 2006 | Moes | Mona | TV drama | NPS |
| 2007 | LEFT (Links) | Stella / Esther / Lucy / Secretary / Doctor | | |
| 2009 | Nothing Personal | Annie | | |
| 2010 | Le Ragazze dello Swing | Judith Leschan | TV mini-series | Rai 1 |
| 2011–2013 | The Borgias | Giulia Farnese | TV series | Showtime |
| 2012 | Suspension of Disbelief | Therese/Angelique | | |
| 2014–2017; 2024 | Outlander | Geillis Duncan | TV series | Starz |
| 2014 | The Fault in Our Stars | Lidewij Vliegenthart | | |
| 2015 | Entertainment | The Chromotherapist | | |
| 2015 | The Last Witch Hunter | Helena | | |
| 2016 | Agent Carter | Ana Jarvis | TV series | |
| 2016–2021 | The Blacklist | Katarina Rostova | TV series | NBC |
| 2017 | Division 19 | Aisha | | |
| 2018 | Counterpart | Ringleader | TV series | Starz |
| 2019 | The Coldest Game | Agent Stone | | |
| 2020 | Transference: A Bipolar Love Story | Marieke | | |
| 2020 | The Book of Vision | Eva / Elizabeth | | |
| 2022 | FBI: International | Astrid Janssen | TV series, episode: "Crestfallen" | |
| 2025 | Nuremberg | Emmy Göring | | |

=== Theatre ===
| Year | Title | Role | Notes |
|---|---|---|---|
| 2009 | Maria Magdalena | | |

=== Video game ===
| Year | Title | Role | Notes |
|---|---|---|---|
| 2026 | Directive 8020 | Laura Eisele | Voice |
