= Agent Carter (film) =

2013 Marvel Studios short film

- Home media release poster
- Directed by: Louis D'Esposito
- Screenplay by: Eric Pearson
- Based on: Peggy Carter by: Stan Lee; Jack Kirby
- Produced by: Kevin Feige
- Starring: Hayley Atwell; Bradley Whitford; Dominic Cooper
- Cinematography: Gabriel Beristain
- Edited by: Peter S. Elliot
- Music by: Christopher Lennertz
- Production company: Marvel Studios
- Distributed by: Walt Disney Studios; Home Entertainment
- Release dates: September 3, 2013 (digital); September 24, 2013 (physical)
- Running time: 15 minutes
- Country: United States
- Language: English

Agent Carter is a 2013 American short film featuring the Marvel Comics character Peggy Carter, produced by Marvel Studios and distributed direct-to-video by Walt Disney Studios Home Entertainment. It is the fourth Marvel One-Shot short film set in the Marvel Cinematic Universe (MCU), sharing continuity with the films of the franchise and taking place after Captain America: The First Avenger (2011). The film is directed by Louis D'Esposito from a screenplay by Eric Pearson, and stars Hayley Atwell as Peggy Carter, along with Bradley Whitford and Dominic Cooper. In Agent Carter, Peggy Carter sets out on a solo mission to acquire the mysterious Zodiac while facing sexism post-World War II at the SSR, a precursor to S.H.I.E.L.D.

A Marvel One-Shot featuring Peggy Carter was in the works for some time before Atwell signed on to star in it, reprising her role from the Captain America films. D'Esposito, co-president of Marvel Studios and an executive producer on the feature films, aimed to replicate the period setting of Captain America: The First Avenger, while also giving the short a more modern, superhero feel. The film was a more ambitious production than previous One-Shots, with more action scenes and visual effects required than previously. Several other characters from Marvel Cinematic Universe films also appear, including Cooper reprising his role of Howard Stark.

The short was released on the home media release of Iron Man 3 in September 2013, and was received positively by critics and the audience from an earlier screening at San Diego Comic-Con. It won a Golden Reel Award. This response led to ABC ordering a television series expansion of the short, Agent Carter, which aired from January 2015 to March 2016, over two seasons.

== Plot ==
One year after the events of Captain America: The First Avenger, Agent Peggy Carter is now a member of the Strategic Scientific Reserve (SSR). She faces sexism from her boss, Agent John Flynn, who treats her condescendingly and keeps her compiling data and code breaking while assigning field cases to the male agents. The SSR's main concern is the mysterious Zodiac, which they have been unable to recover for some time.

One night alone in the office while the men are out together, Carter answers the case line to hear of the location of the Zodiac. Though three to five agents are recommended, Carter decides to go to the location herself. Fighting off multiple guards, Carter is able to retrieve the Zodiac, a mysterious serum, herself. The next day, Flynn reprimands her for not going through the proper procedures to complete the mission, and dismisses the indignant Carter as just an "old flame" of Captain America's who was given her current job out of pity for her bereavement. However, before he can officially punish her, the case line rings again, this time with Howard Stark on the other end, who informs Flynn that Carter will co-head the newly created S.H.I.E.L.D.

In a mid-credits scene, Dum Dum Dugan is seen poolside with Stark, marveling at two women wearing the newly created bikinis.

== Cast ==
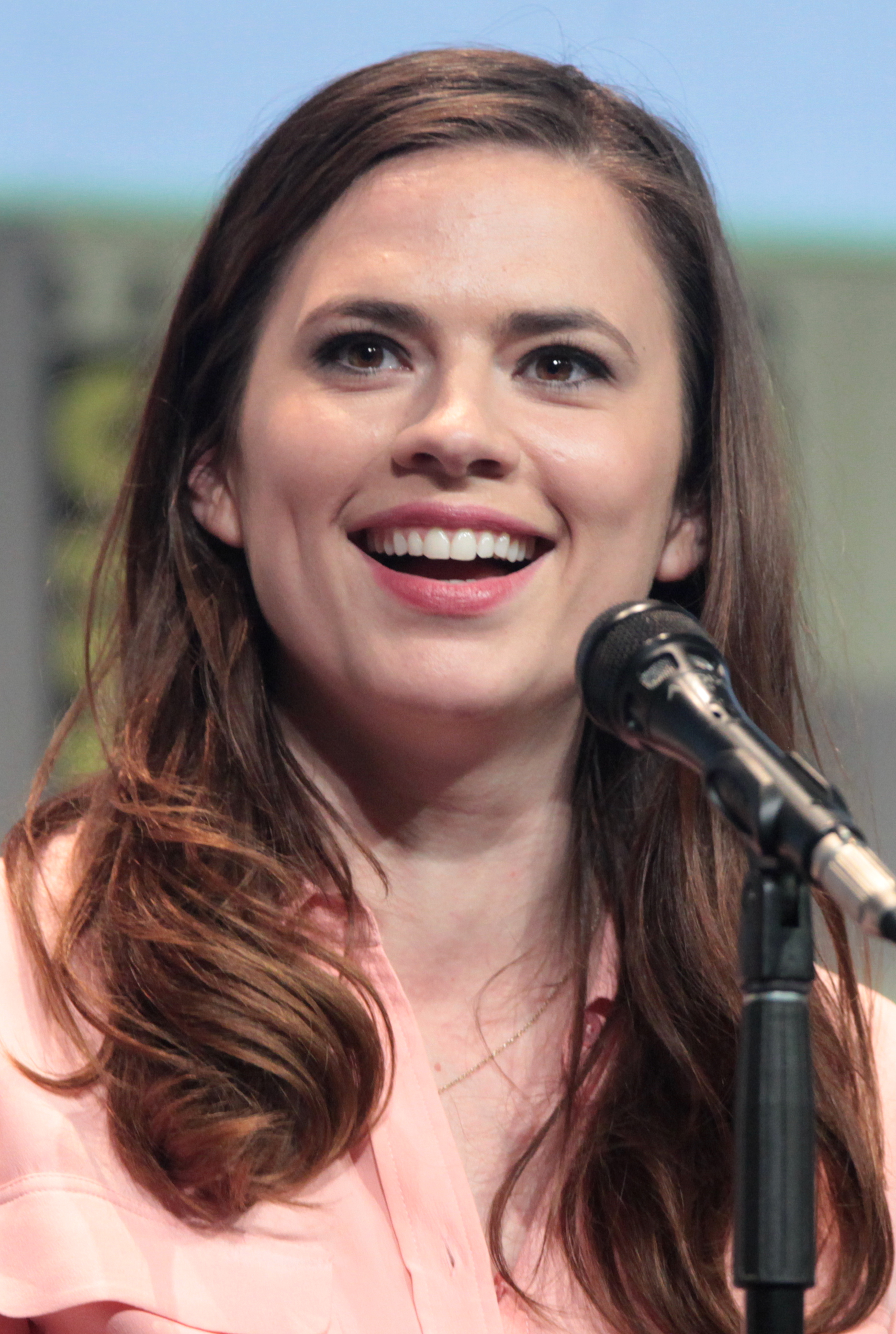
Production on the short began when Hayley Atwell agreed to reprise her role from Captain America: The First Avenger (2011).

- Hayley Atwell as Peggy Carter:
  An SSR agent forced to work in data analysis and code breaking since the end of World War II, Carter reprises her role from the Marvel Cinematic Universe (MCU) film Captain America: The First Avenger (2011). On the character starring in her own short film, director Louis D'Esposito said that Marvel always wanted to do a Peggy Carter short since the character "was a fan-favorite and a Marvel Studios favorite". D'Esposito enjoyed the moment when Carter uses her compact to view the bad guy, which was ad libbed during filming, because "that's the essence of what she's about and what the film's about. Not only is she—especially in that time—a woman in a man's world, she still maintains her femininity".
- Bradley Whitford as John Flynn: Carter's SSR boss.
- Dominic Cooper as Howard Stark:
  The co-head and co-founder of S.H.I.E.L.D., Cooper reprises his role from The First Avenger. In the short, as an easter egg, Stark is seen wearing the same robe that his son Tony wears in Iron Man 2 (2010).

Neal McDonough reprises his role of Timothy "Dum Dum" Dugan from previous MCU films, and Chris Evans appears as Steve Rogers / Captain America via archive footage from The First Avenger. Shane Black, director and co-writer of Iron Man 3 (2013), voices the "Disembodied Voice", the caller on the other end of the case line.

== Production ==
=== Development ===
In August 2011, Marvel Studios announced that a couple of short films would be released direct-to-video, which were designed to be self-contained stories and known as Marvel One-Shots. Co-producer Brad Winderbaum said "It's a fun way to experiment with new characters and ideas, but more importantly it's a way for us to expand the Marvel Cinematic Universe (MCU) and tell stories that live outside the plot of our features." One of the ideas developed as a potential One-Shot was a spin-off from Captain America: The First Avenger (2011), following the story of Peggy Carter after the events of that film. The idea was looked at again when Marvel was deciding on a short film to produce for the home media release of Iron Man 3 in 2013, and it was chosen for the spot, dependent on actress Hayley Atwell's availability.

Marvel Studios co-president Louis D'Esposito, who directed the previous One-Shot Item 47 (2012), returned as director, while writer Eric Pearson also returned from the previous One-Shots. D'Esposito noted that the short had twice the budget of Item 47, but the same amount of shooting time so "the scope of it is much bigger. It's set in a period, there are more actors involved, the scale's bigger, there are three fight scenes—we've never had that in any of [the previous One-Shots]." Atwell agreed to the project after watching Item 47, and due to her love for the character and potential "to show off some of her skill sets" that were not seen in the film. Atwell worked for three days with the stunt team to rehearse the pre-choreographed fight sequences for the short. D'Esposito elaborated on the decision to focus on Carter, saying, "It's telling the best story, and finding that story we want to tell—whether it's connectivity to the Marvel Universe, or it's highlighting a character. In the case of Hayley, it's a little bit of both. We wanted to tell Peggy Carter's story—she's been left back in the '40s. Announcing to the world that she was running S.H.I.E.L.D. with Howard Stark is a great connectivity."

=== Filming ===
Agent Carter was filmed over five days, with Gabriel Beristain serving as cinematographer. The budget did not allow for a storyboard artist to be hired, so D'Esposito, Winderbaum, and Beristain worked together to plan a shot list for the production using stand-in actors. The stunts were also pre-filmed to show the actors. D'Esposito explained that having the shots planned helped with planning the visual effects for the film. The mid-credits scene with Neal McDonough as Dum Dum Dugan was planned to show the character in a pool, but had to be changed on set to taking place beside the pool when it was found that the muscle suit McDonough wears to portray the character could not get wet.

D'Esposito chose to differentiate the short from The First Avenger by avoiding the sepia tone used for that film by director Joe Johnston, instead using a cooler blue color. The production used two old lenses (for both night and day) that gave the short some "better" lens flares that D'Esposito felt gave the period setting a more modern feel. D'Esposito used a Steadicam or a camera dolly for the action sequences, to avoid a "quick cutty or blurry or shaky" feel. D'Esposito said that the crew was ultimately "pushing our limit" to get the planned shots on schedule, and he eventually realized that he "wasn't going to get every shot and I wasn't going to get every punch and kick, so what we do is get the optimum".

=== Post-production ===
External videos
- Agent Carter Title Sequence presents the short film's main-on-end title sequence, YouTube video from Perception's channel

Visual effects shots of 1940s New York from The First Avenger were reused in the short for budgetary reasons. D'Esposito noted the sequence where Carter comes "flying with the gun into the door" and the last fight, when Carter is "being attacked by the big guy", were both created with visual effects elements after they ran out of time to complete filming on them on set. In early 2013, Marvel approached visual effects company Perception to create the main-on-end title sequence for the short. Visual effects supervisor Sheena Duggal was told to retell the story of the short in 90 seconds, so she decided to use stylized versions of imagery from the period and the short itself. A mixture of 2D and 3D animation was used to achieve a final 2D look.

== Music ==
Composer Christopher Lennertz, who previously collaborated with D'Esposito on the One-Shot Item 47, composed the music for Agent Carter. Like the rest of the short, D'Esposito wanted the music to reflect the period setting, but to have a modern feel to it as well, so he sent Lennertz Johnny Rivers' "Secret Agent Man" as a reference track, despite it having been released in the 1960s, since it had the feel and sentiment D'Esposito was looking for.

== Release ==
Agent Carter was first shown in full at the 2013 San Diego Comic-Con. It was then released on the Iron Man 3 home media, first on September 3, 2013, in digital download form, and then on Blu-ray and 3D Blu-ray on September 24, 2013. D'Esposito said that it was decided to release the short along with Iron Man 3 because "the time was right", with Captain America: The Winter Soldier being released in theaters several months later. The short is also included on the bonus disc of the "Marvel Cinematic Universe: Phase Two Collection" box set, which includes all of the Phase Two films in the Marvel Cinematic Universe as well as the other Marvel One-Shots. The collection features audio commentary from D'Esposito and Atwell, and was released on December 8, 2015. After being available on Disney+ under the "Extras" tab of Iron Man 3, the short was given its own listing on the streaming service for the last two weeks of September 2021, and then was removed for unspecified reasons. It returned to Disney+ on January 21, 2022, along with the other One-Shots and the Team Thor films.

== Reception ==
Rosie Fletcher of Total Film noted that the short was well received by the audience at Comic Con, and praised Atwell's performance. She said the short "looks great and packs some euphoric action moments". Andy Hunsaker at CraveOnline gave the short a score of 8.5 out of 10, calling it a fun treat that "gives its title character the send-off she deserves", and hoping that it would lead to further female-focused properties from Marvel. IGN's Scott Collura called Atwell "the big-screen female superhero we've all been waiting for. She kicks so much ass in this short story with such aplomb, using not just brawn but also brains, and it's all very clever and fun." He felt the short seemed more of a proof-of-concept that female-based superhero projects could work, but that "Atwell never loses touch with her feminine side" either.

The Movie Ramblings review of the short highlighted its "short, sharp and witty script mixed with some equally sharp action" and D'Esposito's direction, naming it the best Marvel One-Shot at that point. Flickering Myth called the short "a great effort. A nice, compact story that gives us a lot of great moments with the character." The reviewer felt Flynn made a "great foil" to Carter, and also noted the "great cameos and a post credit scene that should put a smile on everybody's face....Agent Carter is another great Marvel offering that shows how committed they are to the idea of an expanded universe where these great characters get time to shine."

The short won the Golden Reel Award for Best Sound & Music Editing: Direct to Video – Live Action.

== Television series ==
Marvel's Agent Carter, a television series inspired by the short film also starring Hayley Atwell as Peggy Carter, was ordered by ABC on May 8, 2014, and began its first season of eight episodes on January 6, 2015. Dominic Cooper and Neal McDonough also reprised their role of Stark and Dugan in the series, while D'Esposito directed the first episode, and Christopher Lennertz returned to compose the music. The series was created by Christopher Markus & Stephen McFeely, writers on the Captain America films, with Tara Butters, Michele Fazekas, and Chris Dingess serving as showrunners. The series takes place in the middle of the short, before Carter learns that she will be co-head of S.H.I.E.L.D., where she secretly assists Stark with a mission, unbeknownst to the SSR. The series was renewed for a second season on May 7, 2015, consisting of 10 episodes. ABC canceled Agent Carter on May 12, 2016.
