= Reggie Austin (actor) =

American actor (born 1979)

- Born: January 7, 1979 (age 47); Peekskill, New York, U.S.
- Occupation: Actor
- Years active: 2001–present
- Spouse: Nicole Austin

Reggie Austin (born January 7, 1979) is an American actor. He is best known for his recurring roles on the Notes from the Underbelly as Dr. Greg Wise, The Starter Wife as Devon Marsh, Desperate Housewives as Renee Perry's ex-husband Doug Perry, Pretty Little Liars as Eddie Lamb, and Devious Maids as Reggie Miller.

== Personal life ==
As a theater studies major at Yale University, he appeared in numerous stage productions, including starring roles in Macbeth and Othello. After graduation, Reggie moved to New York City, where he performed on stage and in several films before relocating to Los Angeles in 2005.

== Filmography ==
=== Film ===
Year	Title	Role	Notes
2001	A Beautiful Mind	Pen Ceremony Professor	Uncredited
2004	The Manchurian Candidate	Skid Row Resident #1	Uncredited
2004	Proud	Dubois	
2005	1/4life	Eric	
2006	Friends with Money	Old Navy Shopper	
2006	The Omen	Tom Portman	
2006	Pink Collar	Steve P.	
2007	Nurses	Todd	
2007	I'm Paige Wilson	Congressman Larry Gearman	
2010	Please Give	Shopper	
2012	Acts the 3-Man Show	Stephen & Nero	

=== Television ===
Year	Title	Role	Notes
2006	Everwood	Andre Harvey	Episode: "The Land of Confusion"
2007	Saving Grace	Thomas	Episode: "And You Wonder Why I Lie"
2007	Cavemen	Young Man	Episode: "Her Embarrassed of Caveman"
2007	Notes from the Underbelly	Dr. Greg Wise	Episodes: "Pilot", "She's Gotta Have It" and "The Blackout"
2008	Eli Stone	Dr. Francis	Episode: "Heartbeat"
2008	My Boys	Warren	Episode: "Dudes Being Dudes"
2008	The Starter Wife	Devon Marsh	Recurring role, 10 episodes
2009	Bones	James Perry	Episode: "The Beautiful Day in the Neighborhood"
2010	Desperate Housewives	Doug Perry	Episode: "Let Me Entertain You"
2010-2011	Life Unexpected	Jamie	10 episodes
2011	Homeland	Matt	Episodes: "The Good Soldier" and "Achilles Heel"
2012	Up All Night	Issac	Episode: "New Year's Eve"
2012	The Game	Noah	Episodes: "Matchmaker, Matchmaker... Mind Your Business!" and "Keep Your Friends Close and Your Prostitute Closer"
2013	NCIS	Navy Lieutenant Carlton Mane	Episode: "Squall"
2013	NCIS: Los Angeles	Dennis Martin	Episode: "Fallout"
2013–2014	Pretty Little Liars	Eddie Lamb	5 episodes
2014	Devious Maids	Reggie Miller	Episodes: "An Ideal Husband", "The Dark at the Top of the Stairs" and "Crimes of the Heart"
2015	Agent Carter	Jason Wilkes	Recurring role (season 2)
2017–2018	The Fosters	Dean Bayfield	7 episodes
2018–2021	On My Block	Monty Finnie	Recurring role (seasons 1-4)
2018	9-1-1	Glenn	Episode: "Buck, Actually", "Merry Ex–Mas"
2018	The Good Doctor	Todd Williams	Episode: "Stories"
2020	Broke	Ron	Episode: "Dates"
2022	The Rookie: Feds	Adam Link	Episode: "Flashback"
2023	Fantasy Island	Dan Graham	Episode: "#Happy"
2023	Sistas	Michael	Episode: "Mending Fences", "Ordinary Pain" and "Uneven Playing Field"
