= Wynn Everett =

American actress (active 2004–present)

- Born: 1977 or 1978 (age 48–49); Atlanta, Georgia, U.S.
- Occupation: Actress
- Years active: 2004–present
- Spouse: Michael Albanese
- Children: 2

Wynn Everett (born 1977 or 1978) is an American actress known for her roles in Marvel’s Agent Carter and other television programs including Doom Patrol, The Newsroom, and Teenage Bounty Hunters.

== Early life and education ==
Wynn Everett was born in Atlanta, Georgia, the daughter of Ed and Avis Everett. She grew up in Dunwoody and Cumming, Georgia, and attended Forsyth Central High School. Her junior year, she played the lead role in a one-act competition production of Children of a Lesser God, for which she won Georgia State Best Actress.

Everett attended Auburn University, where she was named "Miss Homecoming" in 1998 as a junior. She graduated in 2000 with a Bachelor of Arts in communication and a minor in theatre. She is an alumna of Alpha Gamma Delta women's fraternity. Everett has said of her time in college, "I tried everything, from theater to student government. I just went from Auburn feeling, 'I can go anywhere I want.'"

== Career ==
=== Good Morning America ===
Everett moved to New York City in September 2000, where, in addition to pursuing acting roles and waiting tables, she ran the green room of the Good Morning America morning show. To get the job, Everett had written a letter to Diane Sawyer, whom her mother had hosted in Atlanta in 1963 when Sawyer was America's Junior Miss and Everett's mother was Atlanta's Junior Miss.

Everett held the job for several years, waking up at 3:30am for work. In addition to welcoming guests from Jimmy Carter to troupes of bagpipers, Everett sometimes appeared on air for segments, such as one in which she wore a feather boa and convinced strangers to sing "Copacabana". "My first week at Good Morning America, they’re like, 'Wynn, one of our guests is a famous model'", Everett said. "She came in the door and it was a bulldog. I’m stuffing a 100-pound dog in a bikini and going, 'You have to be kidding.' The next day, it was Bruce Willis."

=== Acting ===
Everett has made appearances on television in House of Lies, Supernatural, Grey's Anatomy, The Event, The Mentalist, Outlaw and the TNT pilot Bird Dog. She has had roles in Root (2004), End of the Spear (2006), as well as playing one of Charlie Wilson's office staff in Charlie Wilson's War (2007). She worked as a green room coordinator on Good Morning America. Everett's poetry has been published in The Curator, Darling Magazine, River Poets Anthology and Wilderness House Literary Review. She appeared as Tamara Hart in the HBO drama series The Newsroom, from 2012 to 2013.

In 2013, Everett was cast as female lead opposite Steve Zahn and Christian Slater in the ABC drama series Mind Games. The series was canceled after five episodes. She later was cast as lead in the TNT drama pilot Lumen.

In 2015, Everett was cast in season 2 of the ABC drama Agent Carter as Whitney Frost, a character based on the actress and inventor Hedy Lamarr. She later reprised the role in Avengers Assemble, where the character was originally a Hydra scientist.

She is featured in The Richards Group's Southeastern Conference "It Just Means More"advertising campaign which debuted on September 1, 2016.

In 2020, Everett played Ellen Johnson, the beloved guidance counselor of Willingham Academy in the sole season of the Netflix series Teenage Bounty Hunters. In 2021, Everett was cast in season 3 of Doom Patrol as Shelley Byron. In 2023, Everett was cast as mentally unstable Kathy, sister to Ronnie Sullivan, in Season 3 of Netflix hit series, Sweet Magnolias.

== Personal life ==
Everett is married to Michael Albanese, a writer and entrepreneur originally from Marietta, Georgia, whom she met in New York City. They have two daughters and a cat. Since 2019, the family has lived in South Atlanta. Prior to having kids, the couple collected first-edition books by authors like Flannery O'Connor and William Faulkner.

== Filmography ==
=== Film ===
Year	Film	Role	Notes
2004	Root.	The Girl	Short film
2005	End of the Spear	Olive Fleming Liefeld	
2007	Raving	The Other Woman	Short film
2007	Trainwreck: My Life as an Idiot	Saleswoman	
2007	Charlie Wilson's War	Receptionist	
2008	The Collective	Jessica	
2008	The Company Man	Wife	Short film
2009	The Maiden Heist	Docent	
2011	Fashionista	Emily	Short film
2012	Backwards	Reba	
2018	City of Lies	Megan Poole	
2021	Palmer	Lucille	
2026	Heartland	TBA	Post-production

=== Television ===
Year	Title	Role	Notes
2005	Hope & Faith	Grace	3 episodes
2006	Law & Order: Criminal Intent	Mala Marsden	Episode: "Slither"
2009	CSI: Crime Scene Investigation	Hallie Donover	Episode: "One to Go"
2009	Cold Case	Diane Drew	Episode: "The Brush Man"
2009	The Mentalist	Lindsay	Episode: "Russet Potatoes"
2009	Supernatural	Amelia Novak	Episode: "The Rapture"
2009	Valentine	Summer Whalen	Episode: "Summer Nights"
2009	In Plain Sight	Camille Ashmore / Camille Andrews	Episode: "Once a Ponzi Time"
2009	Bones	Nicole DaFonte	Episode: "The Dwarf in the Dirt"
2010	Drop Dead Diva	Lindsey Porter	Episode: "Back from the Dead"
2010	Outlaw	Jessica Davis	Episode: "In Re: Jessica Davis"
2010	Grey's Anatomy	Christy Cornell	Episode: "That's Me Trying"
2010	The Event	Rachel	3 episodes
2011	NCIS: Los Angeles	Ariel Drewett	Episode: "Rocket Man"
2011	Bird Dog		TV pilot
2012	House of Lies	Suzanne Tyler	Episode: "Prologue and Aftermath"
2013	Vegas	Hazel	Episode: "Past Lives"
2012–2014	The Newsroom	Tamara Hart	Recurring role; 19 episodes
2014	Mind Games	Claire Edwards	Series regular
2016	Agent Carter	Whitney Frost / Agnes Cully	Recurring role (Season 2); 10 episodes
2016–2018	This Is Us	Shelly	5 episodes
2017–2019	Avengers Assemble	Madame Masque / Whitney Frost (voice)	Recurring role; 6 episodes
2018	Kevin (Probably) Saves the World	Pancakes (voice)	Episode: "Caught White-Handed"
2018	Here and Now	Babette Gibson	Episode: "Fight, Death"
2018	Modern Family	Ms. Wolfe	Episode: "Daddy Issues"
2018	Reverie	Vivian Maxwell	Episode: "Pas de Deux"
2019	Patsy & Loretta	Jeanette Davis	TV film
2019	Dolly Parton's Heartstrings	Willa	Episode: "Jolene"
2020	Teenage Bounty Hunters	Ellen Johnson	Recurring role
2021, 2023	Doom Patrol	Shelley Byron / The Fog	Recurring role (Season 3); Guest (Season 4); 7 episodes
2021	Ordinary Joe	Celeste Kimbreau	2 episodes
2022–present	Sweet Magnolias	Kathy	Recurring role
2022	The Walking Dead	April Martens	Episode: "The Rotten Core"
2023	Young Rock	Gretchen Calamari	Episode: "Chest to Chest"
2025–2026	Chad Powers	Tricia Yeager	Main cast
2026	DTF St. Louis	Eimy Forrest	4 episodes
2026	Will Trent	Janice-Theresa Weggle	2 episodes
2026	M.I.A.	Nancy	Recurring role
2026	Cape Fear	Catherine Buckley	2 episodes
2027	Scooby-Doo: Origins	TBA	Filming
