= List of S.H.I.E.L.D. members =

S.H.I.E.L.D. is a Marvel Comics fictional advanced counterterrorism and intelligence agency charged with investigating and neutralizing paranormal and superhuman threats for global security. It was created by Stan Lee and Jack Kirby in Strange Tales #135 (August 1965) and appeared throughout the publisher's entire comic book line. The agency and its traditional executive director, Nick Fury, have also starred in their own series and miniseries sporadically since that time, most notably during a late-1960s run by writer-artist Jim Steranko.

Three official continuity versions of S.H.I.E.L.D. are listed here: the traditional version in mainstream Marvel Universe continuity, followed by the alternate reality version published under the Ultimate Marvel imprint, as well as the Marvel Cinematic Universe version. Amalgam Comics, a joint venture between Marvel and DC Comics, have their own version of S.H.I.E.L.D. that combines characters from both publishers. An example of this would be Super Soldier, who possesses an amalgamation of the superpowers of Superman and Captain America.

== Marvel Universe S.H.I.E.L.D. ==
=== Executive Directors and Secretaries ===
- Colonel Rick Stoner – First known executive director. Assassinated by the terrorist group Hydra.
- Colonel Nick Fury – Second known executive director. Level 10 Agent.
- Timothy "Dum Dum" Dugan – Third known executive director. Former Corporal of Fury's World War II squad.
- G. W. Bridge – Fourth known executive director.
- Sharon Carter (Agent 13) – Fifth known executive director. She is often detailed as liaison officer to Captain America.
- Maria Hill – Sixth known executive director. Level 9 Agent.
- Anthony Edward "Tony" Stark (Iron Man) – Seventh known executive director. Takes up the position after the Civil War.
- Norman Osborn – Eighth known executive director. Takes up position after Secret Invasion. Dismantles S.H.I.E.L.D. and renames it H.A.M.M.E.R.
- Commander Steve Rogers (Captain America) – Ninth known executive director. Assigned as "America's top cop" following the Siege of Asgard, the arrest of Norman Osborn, the dismantling of H.A.M.M.E.R., and the repeal of the Superhuman Registration Act. He was later reappointed during the Secret Empire storyline where a Hydra-controlled S.H.I.E.L.D. takes over the United States and is later disbanded.
- Daisy Johnson (Quake) – Tenth known executive director. Former protégé of Nick Fury and daughter of Calvin Zabo/Mister Hyde.
- Phil Coulson – Level 8 Agent.
- Seth Burnett – Level 12 Agent

=== Notable Agents (Pre-Civil War) ===
- Agent 22
- Agent 74 – Sent to battle Vamp to demonstrate her abilities to Captain America.
- Agent M – Expert in the Microverse.
- John Allen Adams – Head of ESP squad.
- Agent Boyer undercover unit, dating Joe
- Dr. Ames – Medical surgeon stationed at Central.
- Anderson
- Earl Angstrum – Senior agent. His son was killed by the mutation of former Deathlok John Kelly (Biohazard).
- Artie – Member of S.H.I.E.L.D.'s Superhuman Cleanup Department of Sanitation (SCUDS).
- Ashton – He is in charge of securing the alien spaceship of Golden Blade and Sapper.
- Ken Avery – Thirty-year veteran. A senior officer aboard the Helicarrier.
- Bainbridge
- Balaban – Serving on the Helicarrier with G. W. Bridge.
- Baker – Stationed aboard the Helicarrier.
- Ted Bailey – Stationed at front company D-Fleks Industries. Briefly carried consciousness of Jack Truman.
- Beefcake – LMD assigned to the Hulkbusters unit.
- Bradley Beemer – Part of the Howling Commandos monster force. He is also the Area 13 technical chief.
- Bellini – Ranking officer at the Venice, Italy, station.
- Berdino
- Berger – Formerly stationed in a training camp in Saudi Arabia. She accompanied Nick Fury to investigate a base in the Middle East.
- Bill – Partner of Joe. He picked up Agent L's microfilm from unnamed agents, but blew up his own car to stop Hydra agents. It is unknown if he survived.
- Blake
- Sally Blevins (Skids) – A mutant who infiltrated two factions of the Morlocks, later involved in intrigue among Hawkeye, the Winter Soldier, and Black Widow.
- Boothroyd – Administrator in charge of personal effects department. Probable transfer from MI-6. Could also be a reference to Major Boothroyd, the equipment officer code-named "Q" in the James Bond movie series.
- Abigail Brand – Head of S.W.O.R.D. (Sentient World Observation and Response Department), a subdivision of S.H.I.E.L.D. She is a hybrid mutant and alien.
- Joseph Bricklemoore – Agent of the Mutant Task Force that infiltrated the Jean Grey School Student Body by using MGH (Mutant Growth Hormone) to become the mutate Tri-Joey.
- Josephine Bricklemoore – Agent of the Mutant Task Force that infiltrated the Jean Grey School Student Body by using MGH (Mutant Growth Hormone) to become the mutate Squidface.
- Bubba – Member of S.H.I.E.L.D.'s Alpha Team.
- Barth Bukowski – Regional Director in Los Angeles.
- Jenna Carlisle – Forensics agent and adrenaline junkie.
- Mitch Carson – Security agent under Dum Dum Dugan.
- Carstairs – Member of the Alpha Team Armored Squad.
- Monica Chang – Chief of S.H.I.E.L.D.'s Artificial Intelligence division.
- Cheesecake – LMD assigned to the Hulkbusters unit.
- Isadore "Izzy" Cohen – Former private first class in Fury's World War II squad. Agent of S.H.I.E.L.D.
- Colburn – Agent who noted traffic on the Project Contingency files at HQ.
- Colletti – Member of the Alpha Team Armored Squad.
- William Collins – Division commander who led the battle to raze the slave-camp island of the Red Skull and the Hate-Monger.
- Phil Coulson - Also known as the Agent, he is the main Agent of the Marvel Cinematic Universe.
- Crimson – Head of Magic-Ops division and assigned to the Hulkbusters unit.
- Cross – Friend of Contessa Valentina.
- Valentina Allegra de Fontaine – Former Special Director at Public Relations. Senior liaison officer to MI5. Level 9 agent. Revealed to have been replaced by a Skrull.
- Jessica Drew – The original Spider-Woman. Level 7 agent.
- Stanley Dreyfuss – Elektra's contact on Operation: Lock Kiss. Later learns he is a Life Model Decoy.
- Joanie "Nails" Eaton – Member of the Elite Agents.
- John Facchino – Human resources department.
- Rigby Fallon – Boy genius in the Artificial Intelligence division. Wrote most of the programs for the latter-day Helicarrier.
- Farrell – Member of the Alpha Team Armored Squad.
- E.B. Farrell – Weapons expert for the Elite Agents. Calls himself "the Kid".
- Fisher – Dawn Helicarrier technician.
- Nick Fury Jr. – Son of Nick Fury. Also known as Marcus Johnson.
- Gerrard – Field agent for the Foreign Affairs office.
- Giulietta – Technician at the Venice, Italy, station.
- Gomez – Member of the Alpha Team Armored Squad.
- Herrick Goldman – Among group of renegade agents attempting to take over the Helicarrier for the impromptu war crimes trial of a KGB agent.
- Hazeltine – Intelligence agent at Central.
- Hugh Howard – Pilot and mechanic aboard Behemoth IV Helicarrier, charged with capturing Godzilla. The name is a reference to aviator, engineer, and multi-billionaire Howard Hughes.
- Jerry Hunt – Agent assigned to Scotland Yard. Former lover of Jessica Drew.
- Horatio Huxley – Ranking executive of Level 13. He was previously involved in Alpha Flight.
- Jackson – Pilot in Unit 6 of the Air Cavalry.
- Karl Janáček – Rank L-3.
- Valerie Jessup Toomes – Daughter of supervillain the Vulture.
- Johnson – Attempted to free agents from the City of the Space Gods.
- Daisy Johnson – Seismic-powered "super-agent". She is the only known agent with "Level 10" security clearance aside from Fury and the Black Widow (Natasha Romanova).
- Jones (Jonesy) – Youthful field agent involved in the operations against the Pantheon and the Punisher.
- Gabriel "Gabe" Jones – Former private first class in Fury's World War II squad.
- Kallebach – Field agent during investigation of assassinations at J-2 conference.
- Kelso – Pilot in Unit 6 of the Air Cavalry.
- Derek Khanata – Ex-Hatut Zeraze operative from Wakanda. He was Carmilla Black's carrier and the senior investigator on the "Agents of Atlas" cases. After S.H.I.E.L.D. is dismantled, he later joins the group.
- Helen Kim – Agent investigating the Brothers Grace crime family.
- Veronica King
- Judith Klemmer (Agent 324) – Agent charged with tracking down Baron Ludwig von Schtupf, a.k.a. the Monster-Maker.
- Cameron Klein – Grade T-7 technician. Became field agent and helped capture supervillain Cache.
- Eric Koenig – German defector. He was a replacement member of the World War II Howling Commandos.
- Ali Kokmen – Interfered with Khanata in the Scorpion affair.
- Bruno Kreah – Low-level engineer. He worked on the surveillance equipment used to infiltrate Datalink Systems.
- Sayuri Kyota (M-80) – Demolitions expert of the Elite Agents.
- Sidney "Gaffer" Levine – Primary ordnance inventor and gadgeteer.
- Charles Little Sky – Mutant Director of A.R.M.O.R.
- Alphonso "Mac" MacKenzie – Senior liaison officer to CIA.
- Dr. Myron MacLain – High-ranking scientist who is a seminal adamantium researcher.
- Dino Manelli – Former private in Fury's World War II squad. He was an Italian-American star.
- Kirby Martell – S.H.I.E.L.D. scientist. She operated a captured neo-Nazi time machine.
- Tony Masters – An agent of S.H.I.E.L.D. who would go on to become the Taskmaster. Because of his abilities, Masters has forgotten his S.H.I.E.L.D. past and unknowingly works as an undercover agent.
- Chastity McBryde – Squad leader. Fought against Elektra and other rogues that S.H.I.E.L.D. suspected to be Elektra's accomplices.
- Chris McCarthy – Low-level agent. He was the first person to wear Hank Pym's 2006 Ant-Man suit.
- Mercedes Merced – Undercover agent and Taskmaster's handler.
- Alisanda "Ali" Morales – Undercover in Cuba. She helped Captain America and Falcon track down "Anti-Cap". Stayed with S.H.I.E.L.D. when it became H.A.M.M.E.R.
- Murray – Agent working in reactor core of Central.
- Kate Neville - Aid to Nick Fury and trained marksman. Killed by Baron Strucker.
- N'Gami – Technological advisor and a Wakandan government liaison officer.
- Noriko Nagayoshi – Tech Directorate under Agent Khantana during operation to outfit Camilla Black as the Scorpion.
- Niles Nordstrom – Rank L-8.
- Brady O'Brien – Nearly had affair with Mary Jane Parker when she was separated from Peter. He later attempted to force her to give up Spider-Man or face arrest.
- Eric O'Grady (Ant-Man) – Third known Ant-Man.
- Jake Oh – Field operative stationed at Weapon Plus Headquarters.
- Kara Lynn Palamas (Agent 33) – Researcher; recruited Hercules for operation against Ares and Warhawks.
- Jeffery Parks – Infiltrated the City of the Space Gods. He was reduced to basic matter. Rank L-6.
- Paulo – Technician at Venice station.
- Pandora Peters – Director of S.H.I.E.L.D.'s magic response unit, the Wizardry Alchemy and Necromancy Department W.A.N.D.
- Farrell Phillips – Commander for Dawn Helicarrier. Captain in Black Bird of the Gold Squadron.
- Mr. Postal – Mission coordinator for cyborg agents.
- Emily Preston – Agent whose human consciousness was transferred into a LMD after she was killed by zombie George Washington.
- Clay Quartermain – Former liaison officer of the "Hulkbusters", the Hulk-hunting operations of the U.S. Armed Forces. Supervisor for Nick Fury's Howling Commandos. Level 8 agent. Stated in transcripts of Nick Fury's "Secret Files" in Secret War.
- Cliff Randall – Pilot. He later learned he was an extraterrestrial.
- Red (Agent 1–16)
- Steve Rogers (Captain America) – Has regularly undertaken missions for S.H.I.E.L.D.
- Jack Rollins – Infiltrated Roxxon for the uncovered Delta program, the catalyst for Deltite Affair.
- Natasha Romanova (Black Widow) – First known Black Widow. Was a level 10 agent before S.H.I.E.L.D. was restructured. One of S.H.I.E.L.D.'s top agents.
- Colonel Michael "Mickey" Rossi – Former lover of Carol Danvers.
- Gail Runciter – Trained alongside Wendell Vaughn. She was temporarily replaced by a Deltite.
- Sam – Stationed at Central's barbershop entrance.
- Ayna Sareva – Assisted Khanata in the Scorpion affair.
- Constance Seagrum – Pilot of Unit 6's Air Cavalry.
- Tia Senyaka – Investigated the death of Agent Harlan, who had died in a car accident.
- Gerald "Silcon" Simms – A member of the Elite Agents, with liquid-metal cybernetic arms.
- Simon – Communication officer on the Helicarrier.
- Captain Simon
- Jakuna Singh – Brother of Sarapha. Killed by Damiru.
- Jasper Sitwell – Interrogator. Former interim executive director and former liaison to Tony Stark and Iron Man. Nick Fury's "Secret Files" in Secret War lists Sitwell as a Level 5 interrogator and a Level 5 agent in most transcripts. For two, he is listed as Level 8.
- Carla Smith – Nick Fury's appointment secretary.
- Rosalind Solomon - Agent E-23. An environmental agent.
- Dwight Rollin Stanford – Rank L-3.
- Michael Stevenson – Infiltrated the City of the Space Gods. He was reduced to basic matter. Rank L-6
- Angel Tarnaki – Air Cavalry. She brought in X-Force to reveal history of Dr. Constantin Racal and Niles Roman.
- Kimberly Taylor – One of the last agents trained by Nick Fury. Assigned by G. W. Bridge to protect the Rev. William Connover.
- Teresa – Fury's personal secretary.
- Colonel Nate Thurman – Chief administration officer for Helicarrier repairs. Among group of renegade agents attempting to take over Helicarrier for impromptu war crimes trial of KGB agent.
- Agent Todd - Direct report to Pandora Peters, Holder of the Mouth of Madness and Mismemory which allows him to reshape people's memories as a personal power.
- Jack Truman (Agent 18/Deathlok) – Fourth known Deathlok cyborg.
- Samantha Twotrees – Turncoat working with rogue agent Inali Redpath.
- Steven Tyler – Infiltrated the City of the Space Gods. He was reduced to basic matter. Rank L-6
- Wendell Vaughn (Quasar) – Became the superhero Quasar during a security assignment.
- Kali Vries – Former lover of John Walker. She infiltrated S.T.A.R.S. (Superhuman Tactical Activities Response Squad).
- John Warden – Lead ESP telepath stationed at telepathic amplifier.
- Seth Waters – Administrator for Washington, D.C.'s bureau.
- Commander Jonas Williams – Led task-force to apprehend AWOL agent, Sharon Carter.
- Sam Wilson (Falcon) – Superhero and Avengers member the Falcon.
- Annie Wong - Agent from S.H.I.E.L.D.'s Hong Kong branch.
- Jimmy Woo (Yellow Claw) – Former FBI agent who fought Yellow Claw and later hunted Godzilla. Level 3 interrogator and Level 5 agent (two transcripts of Nick Fury's "Secret Files" in Secret War list Jimmy Woo as a Level 8 agent).
- Larry Young – S.H.I.E.L.D. Air Cavalry officer. Later, fifth known Deathlok cyborg.

=== Notable Agents (Post-Civil War) ===
After the Civil War, Many superheroes that fought on the Pro-registration side of the conflict are now agents of S.H.I.E.L.D. Various heroes were involved as recruiters, trainers, team leaders, and trainees in the 50-State Initiative to provide a superhero team for every U.S. state.

=== Former agents ===
- Val Adair – Rank L-6; expelled.
- Scott Adsit – A former L-6 agent who left with other agents to aid in the reformation of the Nova Corps. The character is based on actor Scott Adsit.
- Agent 9 – Rogue agent who took over the Helicarrier for the Red Skull. Agent 9 was later killed.
- Paul Allen – Rank L-6 agent. He was expelled from S.H.I.E.L.D.
- Harry Angstrum – Records-division agent. He was devoured by Biohazard.
- Dr. Belgrade – Chief scientist in charge of Nemesis project. He was killed by his own creations.
- Yelena Belova (White Widow) – Second known Black Widow.
- Cameron Bissett – Ensign who was killed by Sabretooth. He was later impersonated by Mystique.
- Alison Blaire (Dazzler) - Chief in mutant affairs appointed by Maria Hill. She was later captured, imprisoned, and impersonated by Mystique. Left to join Cyclop's X-Men team.
- John Bronson – Killed and identity taken by Wolfgang von Strucker. Rank L-4
- Laura Brown – Daughter of Imperial Hydra (Arnold Brown) and one-time lover of Nick Fury.
- Peggy Carter – Rank L-6; deceased.
- Stanley Carter (Sin-Eater) – Became the Sin-Eater and killed Jean DeWolff.
- Colonel Kuro Chin (Agent 60) – Colonel in the Yashonka military. Shot dead helping Captain America escape from that Communist country.
- Clayton Claymore – Cyborg. Died on mission to El Corazon de la Muerte.
- Edward Cobert (Gargantua) – Became the Leviathan when his project went wrong.
- Jeff Cochren – Rank L-5; deceased.
- Condor – On black-ops team the Contingency. Turned rogue and was captured.
- Corbin – Surveillance. He was later assigned inventory duty at Virginia storage center. Killed by an undercover A.I.M. agent.
- Edwin Darwin – Cyborg. Died on a mission to El Corazon de la Muerte
- Alex DePaul – Led investigation of Deviant warlord Tantalus. Friend of Bison. Killed by agent Kara Palamas.
- Carl Delandan (sometimes misspelled Karl) – Regional Director in Manhattan. Rank L-3. He was dismissed from S.H.I.E.L.D.
- Phil Dexter – Retired.
- Roger Dooley – Level 4 officer who usurped Dum Dum Dugan's rank and used the Helicarrier to capture She-Hulk. He was killed.
- David Ferrari (Answer) – Toxic-weapons division at the Furnace. He was thought dead, but was later revealed alive and known as Answer.
- Marvin Flumm (Mentallo) – Psi-division. After being discharged, he became the mutant terrorist Mentallo.
- John Garrett – Cybernetically enhanced agent, known for his lack of discipline. Later becomes the President of the United States of America by the unwanted help of Elektra, who put his mind into the body of the (fictional) President Ken Wind, in order to save the world.
- Lt. Tom Gittes – Auxiliary CO and security chief on the Helicarrier. He was among the group of renegade agents attempting to take over Helicarrier for impromptu war crimes trial of KGB agent. He was killed by agent Thurman.
- Dr. Erik Gorbo – Scientist. He changes form into that of a gorilla to commit crimes.
- Hardcase and the Harriers – Mercenaries who are former agents of S.H.I.E.L.D.
- Margaret Huff – Nick Fury's personal secretary. She reassigned to S.H.I.E.L.D.'s Los Angeles branch where she died investigating a cult. Rank L-6
- Brent Jackson – Betrayed S.H.I.E.L.D. and was a mole for Weapon X.
- Major Shera Joseph – Los Angeles branch member who headed the task force in Imaya. Joined Worldwatch and died of time-travel fatigue.
- Sal Kennedy - Old friend of Tony Stark's, took the position when he became director, killed in an attack on the Helicarrier
- Killdeer – On black-ops team the Contingency. Turned rogue and was captured.
- Kite – On black-ops team the Contingency. Turned rogue and was captured.
- Kevin Kraller – Rank L-6; deceased.
- Jeremy Latcham – Double agent for the Purifiers. He was self-terminated.
- Scott Niles Lawrence – Rank L-6; deceased.
- Shannon Lawrence – Undercover agent exposed to mutating virus giving her ability to shoot knives from her fingers. She was killed.
- Elizabeth Lockhart – High-ranking budget officer. Leaked information to the Punisher; liquidated by the Contessa.
- James "Jamie" Madrox (Multiple Man) – One of several duplicates of the mutant Jamie Madrox (Multiple Man). He was re-absorbed by the original Madrox.
- Adam Manna – Rank L-6; expelled.
- Barbara Morse (Mockingbird) – Known as Agent 19. Rank L-6 agent. She resigned from S.H.I.E.L.D. She was later killed by Mephisto. Barbara was revealed to be alive and replaced by a Skrull. Level 6 agent.
- Dani Moonstar (Mirage) – Former New Mutant. Undercover agent infiltrating the Mutant Liberation Front. She resigned following Operation: Zero Tolerance.
- David Nanjiwarra – Aboriginal agent of A.S.I.O. He was used as a mole and subsequently killed by Scorpio.
- "Network" Nina – Cyber-enhanced ESP agent that fought Algernon Crowe. She was killed in telepathic battle with Psi-Borg.
- Kate Neville – Chief of Ordnance and former lover of Nick Fury, after he was ousted by a compromised S.H.I.E.L.D. by Project Delta-LMDs. She was killed by Baron Strucker.
- Arthur Perry – Unscrupulous killer who made it into a S.H.I.E.L.D.- program for cybernetically enhanced "super agents". Was later killed by Elektra.
- Kitty Pryde – Member of the X-Men as Shadowcat. Recruited as an intern while a member of Excalibur.
- Dave Purcell – Killed with girlfriend and identity taken by Hydra at academy graduation ceremony.
- Pyle – Surveillance-team leader. He was later assigned inventory duty at Virginia storage center where he was killed.
- Rapture – Leader of the black-ops team the Contingency. Rapture's a low-level telepath.
- Inali Redpath – Cherokee shaman with ability to control weather. He turned rogue and used S.H.I.E.L.D. to attack U.S. to reclaim land for the Native Americans.
- Richard Rennselaer – Field agent (L-6); resigned. He became the mutant terrorist Overrider.
- Frank Rhodes – Quit S.H.I.E.L.D. and eventually became an ally of Cable. Killed by D'Von Kray, a New Canaanite warrior.
- Buck Richlen – Rank L-5; expelled.
- Nathaniel Richards
- Rico Santana – Rank L-3; expelled.
- Heather Sante – Charged by Iron Man to keep an eye on Mar-Vell.
- Simon – Double agent for Tantalus. He was killed by Pandara.
- Shrike – Member of the black-ops team the Contingency. He turned rogue and was captured.
- John "Skul" Skulinowski – Team leader of the Elite Agents.
- Eugene Spandell – Cyborg. He died on mission to El Corazon de la Muerte.
- Howard Stark
- SULTAN – Former weapons designer and computer and code expert.
- Mitchell Tanner – As Warhawk, he was conscripted to serve as a temporary agent in exchange for reducing his sentence.
- Neal Tapper – Formerly involved with Sharon Carter. He was killed in an explosion.
- Kate Waynesboro – Monitored Bruce Banner following Banner's presidential pardon.
- Nance Winters - Agent brainwashed by Anne-Marie Cortez to join the Acolytes
- William Wesley – Test pilot who volunteered to test the quantum bands, which overloaded and killed him.

=== Super-agents ===
- Blue Streak – Member of the first Super Agents program. He was a double agent for the corporation. Assassinated by Scourge of the Underworld.
- Wendell Vaughn (Marvel Boy) – Member of the first Super Agents program. He later became known as "Quasar".
- Texas Twister – Member of the first Super Agents program. Quit S.H.I.E.L.D. to form his own team, the Rangers.
- Vamp – Member of the first Super Agents program. Professional criminal who is a double agent for the corporation. Became "Animus". Killed by Scourge.
- Ivory – Wakandan native in the second Super Agents program. She was killed by Hydra double agents.
- Knock-About – Hydra double agent. Imprisoned by Nick Fury.
- Psi-Borg – Cybernetically enhanced Latverian. She is a charter member of the second Super Agents program. Revealed as a Hydra double agent and was killed in telepathic battle with "Network" Nina.
- Violence – She was revealed as a Hydra double agent in the Super Agents program. Granddaughter of ex-Howling Commando Percy Pinkerton. Killed by Nick Fury.

=== Pre-modern agents ===
As revealed in the 2010 series S.H.I.E.L.D.:

- Imhotep (ancient founder)
- Zhang Heng
- Leonardo da Vinci
- Galileo Galilei
- Isaac Newton

== Ultimate Marvel Universe S.H.I.E.L.D. ==
=== Executive directors and secretaries ===
- General Thaddeus E. "Thunderbolt" Ross – Executive director until his attempted murder by John Wraith. Later became government liaison to the Baxter Building, and then the Fantastic Four.
- General Nick Fury – Executive director after Thunderbolt Ross' attempted murder. Was taken into custody by the Squadron Supreme of Earth-31916 for his role in the events of Ultimate Power, effectively removing him from the position.
- Carol Danvers – Executive director after Nick Fury's involvement in the events of Ultimate Power and subsequent capture. She is a liaison/girlfriend to the alien Captain Mahr Vehl.
- Monica Chang – Executive director after Marvin Flumm was fired by Steve Rogers.

=== Notable agents ===
- Bruce Banner – Banner works for S.H.I.E.L.D. gathering resources for the better of mankind. In exchange, he allows S.H.I.E.L.D to use the Hulk for their needs.
- Agent Sharon Carter – Dealt with illegal genetic mutations until the Ultimates were created.
- Jefferson Davis – Legally changed his name to Jefferson Morales.
- Corporal Thaddeus Aloysius Cadwallander "Dum Dum" Dugan – Commander of Mutant Ops Division.
- Sofia Mantega (Renascence) – S.H.I.E.L.D trainee
- Daimon Hellstrom – S.H.I.E.L.D. spy within the Defenders.
- Dr. Philip Lawson (Mahr Vehl) – Spy of the alien Kree race; defected.
- Xi'an Coy Manh – Assigned to government-sponsored mutant team to investigate anti-mutant conspiracy.
- Peter Parker (Spider-Man) – A temporary agent who was assigned to track down the Green Goblin.
- Kitty Pryde (Shadowcat) – A temporary agent who was assigned to track down the Green Goblin.
- Clay Quartermain – S.H.I.E.L.D. Special Ops.
- Betty Ross – Former girlfriend of Bruce Banner and head of Public Relations.
- The New Sentinels – Group of 60 agents with advanced body armor used to combat Magneto.
- Elijah Stern (Tinkerer) – Specialized-equipment maker and creator of the Spider-Slayers.
- Agent Wendell Vaughn – Head of security for Project Pegasus in Devil's Point, Wyoming.
- Dr. Jennifer Walters – Scientist in Super Soldier project.
- Sam Wilson (Falcon) – Discovered the alien Vision and worked with her to learn details of alien threat Gah Lak Tus.
- James "Jimmy" Woo – Partnered with Sharon Carter.

=== Former agents ===
- Blackie Drago (Vulture) – An assassin who became the "Vulture" with a powered flying suit.
- Hank Pym (Giant-Man) – Headed Super Soldier project after Bruce Banner's mental breakdown. He is also the superhero Giant-Man.
- Natasha Romanova (Black Widow) – Member of the Ultimates covert-ops division, then promoted to public team. After engagement to Tony Stark (Iron Man), Romanova temporarily leaves the team to join the Liberators.
- Colonel John Wraith – Head of the Weapon X program until killed by Nick Fury, but became Vindicator of Alpha Flight.
- The Ultimates – S.H.I.E.L.D.'s superhuman team that is the Ultimate Marvel version of the Avengers. Broke off after the Ultimates 2 in order to avoid being tied to politics.

== Marvel Cinematic Universe S.H.I.E.L.D. ==
In the Marvel Cinematic Universe, S.H.I.E.L.D. was founded by Strategic Scientific Reserve agent Peggy Carter, along with Chester Phillips and Howard Stark in the 1950s. It was later revealed in Captain America: The Winter Soldier, that S.H.I.E.L.D. was infiltrated by Hydra since its formation. When Hydra emerges in 2014, S.H.I.E.L.D. is labeled as a terrorist organization while most of its non-Hydra members leave S.H.I.E.L.D. to work the private sector or go off the grid. In the finale of the first season of the Agents of S.H.I.E.L.D., Nick Fury charges Phil Coulson with rebuilding the organization as the new director.

=== Executive directors and secretaries ===
- Peggy Carter – co-founder of S.H.I.E.L.D.; First known executive director. Deceased.
- Howard Stark – co-founder of S.H.I.E.L.D. Deceased.
- Chester Phillips – co-founder of S.H.I.E.L.D. Deceased.
- Alexander Pierce – Secretary of S.H.I.E.L.D. Deceased.
- Nick Fury – Former executive director; faked his death after S.H.I.E.L.D's fall and appointed Phil Coulson as his successor.
- Maria Hill – Field agent; former deputy director; had Level 9 Security Clearance before S.H.I.E.L.D. was taken down. Deceased.
- Phil Coulson – Executive director; current field officer who oversees many of the division's field operations; briefly deceased before being subjected to GH-325. Deceased but his consciousness was transferred to an LMD based on Chronicom technology.
- Jeffrey Mace – Executive director. Appointed in the wake of the Sokovia Accords and S.H.I.E.L.D. being made a legitimate organization again. Deceased.
- Daisy Johnson / Skye / Quake – Field agent; computer hacker; first known Inhuman agent with the ability to generate seismic vibrations. Leader of the Secret Warriors. Former executive director of S.H.I.E.L.D.
- Alphonso "Mack" Mackenzie – Mechanic and field agent; founding member of the "Real S.H.I.E.L.D." and new executive director of S.H.I.E.L.D. handpicked by Daisy after Coulson retired.

=== Notable agents ===
- Agent 60 – In contact with Coulson's team.
- Barbour – Stationed at the Hub.
- Baylin – Stationed at the Hub.
- Tomas Calderon – Member of the "Real S.H.I.E.L.D."
- Goodman – Doctor; participated in experiments on GH-325 and in Phil Coulson's resurrection.
- Billy Koenig – Stationed at secret base Playground.
- Sam Koenig – Stationed at secret base Playground.
- Jazuat – Doctor; stationed at S.H.I.E.L.D. Trauma Zentrum in Zurich, Switzerland.
- Jones – Stationed at the Hub.
- Mack – Undercover trucker.
- Mike Peterson / Deathlok – Former test subject for Project Centipede and slave of John Garrett and Hydra. Now a member of S.H.I.E.L.D.
- Elena "Yo–Yo" Rodriguez – Inhuman field agent with ability to move at super speed for the duration of one heartbeat before returning to her starting point. Member of the Secret Warriors.
- Katherine Shane – Undercover specialist.
- Shade – Stationed at the Hub.
- Shaw – Undercover specialist; stationed at the Hub.
- Streiten – Doctor; participated in Phil Coulson's resurrection.
- Tyler – Mechanic aboard helicarrier; later field agent.
- Anne Weaver – Director of the S.H.I.E.L.D. Academy of Science and Technology; member of the "Real S.H.I.E.L.D."

=== Former agents ===
- Akela Amador – Undercover operative prior to being kidnapped by Project Centipede/Hydra organization. Freed from their control by Phil Coulson's group. Incarcerated.
- Linda Avery – Field agent who discovered Skye as an infant. Deceased.
- Clint Barton / Hawkeye – Assassin and skilled marksman with an exceptional ability in archery; founding member of the Avengers. Level 7 Security Clearance.
- Laura Barton – Espionage agent.
- Felix Blake – Espionage agent; went rogue after S.H.I.E.L.D.'s collapse and joined the Watchdogs. Status Unknown.
- Roger Browning – Stationed at a S.H.I.E.L.D. containment facility; went freelance after S.H.I.E.L.D.'s fall; killed by Carl Creel while trying to sell classified information.
- Lincoln Campbell – Inhuman doctor and field agent with ability to generate electrical charges; member of the Secret Warriors. Deceased.
- Mitchell Carson – Former Head of Defense at S.H.I.E.L.D.; now a member of Hydra.
- Sharon Carter / Agent 13 – Espionage agent; now a member of the CIA.
- Chaimson – Stationed at the Hub. Deceased.
- Sebastian Derik – Assassin; test subject for GH-325; arrested after killing other GH-325 test subjects.
- Leopold "Leo" Fitz – Weapons, gadgets, and cutting-edge technology, Level 5 Clearance; Engineer
- Bill Foster – Scientist; fired by Hank Pym.
- John Garrett – Field operative; Hydra double agent known as the "Clairvoyant"; prototype Deathlok. Deceased.
- Robert Gonzales – An elderly high-ranking S.H.I.E.L.D. Agent, tactician, commander of the Iliad, and founder of the "Real S.H.I.E.L.D."; Deceased.
- Franklin Hall – Former S.H.I.E.L.D. instructor; discovered gravitonium.
- Joey Gutierrez – Inhuman construction worker and field agent with ability to manipulate metal objects; member of the Secret Warriors.
- Victoria Hand – Director of the Hub. Deceased.
- Isabelle "Izzy" Hartley – Undercover specialist; member of "Real" S.H.I.E.L.D. Deceased.
- Hauer – Hydra double agent in 1989; freed Werner Reinhardt from custody.
- Lance Hunter – Decorated former member of SAS who joined his old friend Agent Hartley in doing mercenary work for Coulson's reconstituted S.H.I.E.L.D.; formally joined S.H.I.E.L.D. after avenging Hartley's death. Disavowed status.
- Kaminsky – Helicopter pilot; Hydra double agent. Presumed deceased after being buried in a collapsing Hydra base by May.
- Cameron Klein / Hank Thompson – Field agent; test subject for GH-325; had memories erased and retired to civilian life.
- Eric Koenig – Communications agent; stationed at hidden base Providence. Deceased.
- Jacobson – Stationed at the Hub. Deceased.
- Richard Lumley – Field agent who discovered Skye as an infant; faked death and went off the grid.
- Melinda May – Ace pilot and combat expert, Level 7 Security Clearance, a.k.a. "the Cavalry"; Retired. Administrator
- Barbara "Bobbi" Morse – Espionage agent; founding member of the "Real S.H.I.E.L.D."; a.k.a. Mockingbird. Disavowed status.
- Oliver – Member of the "Real S.H.I.E.L.D." Deceased.
- Kara Lynn Palamas / Agent 33 – Espionage agent; brainwashed by Daniel Whitehall. Deceased.
- Benjamin "Benny" Pollack – Bank robber recruited into S.H.I.E.L.D. R&D Think Tank. Whereabouts unknown.
- Prescod — Field agent who uncovers the Skrulls' invasion. Deceased.
- Hank Pym / Ant-Man – Scientist and field operative.
- Quan Chen – Field agent of S.H.I.E.L.D. Deceased.
- Jack Rollins – Member of S.T.R.I.K.E.; Hydra double agent. Whereabouts unknown; presumed deceased.
- Natasha Romanoff / Black Widow – Assassin and undercover spy; founding member of the Avengers; one of the few agents with known Level 10 Security Clearance. Deceased.
- Steve Rogers / Captain America – Field operative; leader and founding member of the Avengers. Level 8 Security Clearance. Whereabouts unknown; likely deceased.
- Brock Rumlow – Leader of S.T.R.I.K.E.; Hydra double agent. Deceased.
- Lewis Seaver – Test subject for GH-325. Deceased.
- Erik Selvig – Astrophysicist; originally recruited for Project P.E.G.A.S.U.S. to study the Tesseract.
- Jemma Simmons – Life scientist; Xenobiologist (both human and alien), Level 5 Clearance, Bio–chemist.
- Jasper Sitwell – Espionage agent; Hydra double agent. Deceased.
- Daniel Sousa – Chief of S.H.I.E.L.D. West Coast in the 1950s. Originally deceased but was saved by Phil Coulson. Joined Daisy Johnson.
- Tony Stark / Iron Man – S.H.I.E.L.D. Advisor; founding member of the Avengers. Deceased.
- Ava Starr / Ghost – Former field agent. Founding member of the New Avengers, formerly known as the Thunderbolts.
- Elihas Starr – Scientist; fired by Hank Pym. Deceased.
- Rebecca Stevens / Janice Robbins – Stationed at the Triskelion; test subject for GH-325. Deceased.
- Antoine "Trip" Triplett – Field operative. Deceased.
- Janet van Dyne / Wasp – Scientist and field operative.
- Grant Ward – Black ops specialist; Level 7 Security Clearance; Hydra double agent. Deceased.
- Noelle Walters – Team leader in Europe. Deceased.
- Claire Wise – Accomplice of Benny Pollack; became apprentice of Agent Felix Blake. Whereabouts unknown.
- Arnim Zola – Hydra scientist recruited during Operation Paperclip following World War II; restarted Hydra within S.H.I.E.L.D. Deceased.
