= Sgt. Fury & his Howling Commandos: Shotgun Opera =

2009 comic book one-shot published by Marvel Comics

- Cover by John Paul Leon.

Publication information
- Publisher: Marvel Comics
- Publication date: 2009
- No. of issues: 1
- Main character(s): Nick Fury; Howling Commandos

Creative team
- Written by: Jesse Alexander
- Artist: John Paul Leon
- Penciller: John Paul Leon
- Inker: John Paul Leon
- Letterer: John E. Workman Jr.
- Colorist: John Paul Leon
- Editor(s): Mark Paniccia; Joe Quesada; Lauren Sankovitch

Sgt. Fury & his Howling Commandos: Shotgun Opera also known as simply Shotgun Opera or Sgt. Fury and his Howling Commandos, Vol. 2 is a 2009 comic book one-shot published by Marvel Comics. The story was written by Jesse Alexander and drawn by John Paul Leon.

== Background ==
The one-shot was Alexander's first time writing a comic book and he stated in a pre-release interview that he had always loved war comics and was very happy to do it. The series was intended as a tie-in to Captain America: White, the delay of which resulted in this comic to be delayed.

== Publication history ==
The story was first published in 2009 as a one-shot. It was reprinted in the hardcover collected edition named Marvel, los héroes mas poderosos #21: "Nick Fury", in December 2016 which also collected the original series of Secret Warriors issue 1 to 6.

== Plot ==
The story has Nick Fury and the Howling Commandos on a mission behind enemy lines in Yugoslavia. It's in the early days of the war, when Germany had just invaded the country. Alexander chose to use the characters of Nick Fury, Dum Dum Dugan, Rebel Ralston, Izzy Cohen, Gabe Jones, and Pinky Pinkerton.

== Reception ==
The comic holds an average rating of 6.4 by 2 professional critics on the review aggregation website Comic Book Roundup.

Jesse Schedeen of IGN expressed that he thought the story was a rather generic Howling Commandos story. He also criticised Alexander's character dialogue.
