= Gabe Jones =

Fictional character appearing in American comic books published by Marvel Comics

- Gabe Jones as depicted in Sgt. Fury and his Howling Commandos #1 (May 1963). Art by Jack Kirby.

Publication information
- Publisher: Marvel Comics
- First appearance: Sgt. Fury and his Howling Commandos #1 (May 1963)
- Created by: Stan Lee (writer); Jack Kirby (artist)

In-story information
- Alter ego: Gabriel Jones
- Team affiliations: Howling Commandos; S.H.I.E.L.D.; Godzilla Squad

Gabriel Jones is a fictional character appearing in American comic books published by Marvel Comics. Created by writer-editor Stan Lee and artist and co-plotter Jack Kirby, he made his first appearance in World War II war comics series Sgt. Fury and his Howling Commandos #1 (May 1963).

Derek Luke portrayed the character in the Marvel Cinematic Universe film Captain America: The First Avenger. Additionally, B. J. Britt portrayed Jones' grandson, Antoine "Trip" Triplett in the Marvel Cinematic Universe television series Agents of S.H.I.E.L.D.

== Publication history ==
Gabe Jones appeared as a regular cast-member in virtually every issue and annual of Sgt. Fury and his Howling Commandos. In present-day stories, initially in the feature "Nick Fury, Agent of S.H.I.E.L.D." in Strange Tales, he appears as an agent of that fictional espionage organization — inexplicably aged very little, like fellow World War II vet and agent Dum Dum Dugan, despite a retcon explanation for agency head Nick Fury's youthfulness. As a S.H.I.E.L.D. agent, Jones has appeared in issues of The Avengers, Iron Man, Captain America, The Incredible Hulk, Godzilla, the first two volumes of Nick Fury, Agent of S.H.I.E.L.D., and the 1988 miniseries Nick Fury vs. S.H.I.E.L.D.

Although colorist Stan Goldberg knew that Jones was African American, the company that made the engraving plates for Sgt. Fury and his Howling Commandos #1 thought a mistake had been made and colored him the same color as the rest of the Howling Commandos.

== Fictional character biography ==
Gabe Jones was born in New York City. He is an original member of the Howling Commandos combat squad of World War II. The squad's senior officer Samuel "Happy Sam" Sawyer was given virtual carte blanche in choosing its members, including the African-American Jones, despite the fact that (at the time) integrated units were unheard of; The U.S. Armed Forces in real life were not integrated until 1948 by executive order of President Harry S. Truman. He is one of Nick Fury's close confidantes, serving under his sergeant during the Korean War and the Vietnam War in reunion missions and also joined the international espionage organization S.H.I.E.L.D. at some unspecified point after the World War II.

During the war, the Howling Commandos travel to Wakanda to combat a Nazi invasion of that land. Jones helps out the ruling family by killing a Nazi agent who had taken an infant hostage.

In 1959, he is shown working with Dum Dum Dugan and Fury, hunting down and executing Nazis. Later in the same year, Gabe assisted Fury and Dugan in creating the first team of Avengers. They successfully stopped a Nazi splinter group from gaining a version of the Super-Soldier formula.

Jones retired from S.H.I.E.L.D. sometime after, but returned to help train a new corps of recruits. This new class is slain by the terrorist organization HYDRA, S.H.I.E.L.D.'s primary nemesis.

Gabe spends time trying to bring down the evil Secret Empire from within. Following the events of Secret Invasion both he and Dugan quit S.H.I.E.L.D. and recreate the Howling Commandos with ex-S.H.I.E.L.D. agents.

Jones is seen commanding the murder scene investigation of his old friend Clay Quartermain.

Jones and fellow Commando Eric Koenig are later killed by the Gorgon during a battle with HYDRA, while both were fighting a holding action against enemy forces to give time for allies to retreat.

== Other versions ==
An alternate universe variant from Gabe Jones from Earth-9997 makes a cameo appearance in Earth X #8.

== In other media ==
=== Television ===
- Gabe Jones appears in The Incredible Hulk, voiced by Thom Barry. This version is an agent of S.H.I.E.L.D. and a member of General Thunderbolt Ross' Hulkbusters.
- Gabe Jones makes a non-speaking appearance in The Avengers: Earth's Mightiest Heroes episode "Meet Captain America".

=== Film ===
Gabe Jones appears in Captain America: The First Avenger, portrayed by Derek Luke. This version is an alumnus of Howard University and member of the Howling Commandos.

=== Video games ===
- Gabe Jones makes a cameo appearance in Marvel: Ultimate Alliance.
- Gabe Jones makes a cameo appearance in Spider-Man 2 via a photograph. This version was a famous jazz trumpeter from Harlem during the 1930s before enlisting in army intelligence during World War II, serving in the Korean War, and later joining S.H.I.E.L.D. By the present, his music equipment and performance attire are recovered and displayed in an exhibit celebrating African-American art and history.
- Gabe Jones will appear as a playable character in Marvel 1943: Rise of Hydra, voiced by Marque Richardson.

== See also ==
- List of S.H.I.E.L.D. members
