= Samuel Sawyer =

Samuel Sawyer may refer to:

- Samuel Locke Sawyer (1813–1890), U.S. Representative from Missouri
- Samuel Tredwell Sawyer (1800–1865), U.S. Representative from North Carolina
- Happy Sam Sawyer, a Marvel Comics character
