= List of Agent Carter characters =

Agent Carter is an American television series created for ABC by Christopher Markus & Stephen McFeely, inspired by the 2011 film Captain America: The First Avenger, and the 2013 Marvel One-Shot short film of the same name. It is set in the Marvel Cinematic Universe (MCU), sharing continuity with the films and other television series of the franchise. The first season, consisting of eight episodes, originally aired from January 6 to February 24, 2015, while the second season, consisting of ten episodes, originally aired from January 19 to March 1, 2016. Agent Carter was canceled by ABC on May 12, 2016.

The series features the Marvel Comics character Peggy Carter, with Hayley Atwell reprising her role from the film series and One-Shot, as she must balance life as a secret agent with that of a single woman in 1940s America. Also starring is James D'Arcy as Edwin Jarvis, butler to Howard Stark who joins Carter for her missions, developing a strong platonic relationship with her. The pair are joined by series regulars Chad Michael Murray as Jack Thompson and Enver Gjokaj as Daniel Sousa, as well as Shea Whigham as Roger Dooley for the first season. Whigham signed on to the series knowing that his character, Dooley, would be killed off during the first season. Dominic Cooper portrays Stark, reprising his role from the films and One-Shot in a recurring capacity for the series. Agent Carter also introduces the origins of several characters and storylines from MCU films: Bridget Regan recurs as Dottie Underwood, an early product of the Black Widow program; and Ralph Brown recurs as Johann Fennhoff, the pioneer of Hydra's mind control techniques.

In addition to original characters, the series' cast also includes further characters based on various Marvel Comics properties, as well as more characters crossing over from the MCU films. The following list includes Agent Carter's main cast, as determined by its producers, as well as all guest stars deemed to have had recurring roles throughout the series, and a supplementary list of other noteworthy guests.

== Overview ==
Character	Portrayed by	Appearances		
Character	Portrayed by	First	Season 1	Season 2
Main characters
Peggy Carter	Hayley Atwell	"Now is Not the End"	Main	Main
Edwin Jarvis	James D'Arcy	"Now is Not the End"	Main	Main
Jack Thompson	Chad Michael Murray	"Now is Not the End"	Main	Main
Daniel Sousa	Enver Gjokaj	"Now is Not the End"	Main	Main
Roger Dooley	Shea Whigham	"Now is Not the End"	Main	
Recurring characters
Howard Stark	Dominic Cooper	"Now is Not the End"	Recurring	Guest
Angie Martinelli	Lyndsy Fonseca	"Now is Not the End"	Recurring	Guest
Ray Krzeminski	Kyle Bornheimer	"Now is Not the End"	Recurring	
Rose Roberts	Lesley Boone	"Now is Not the End"	Guest	Recurring
Miriam Fry	Meagen Fay	"Bridge and Tunnel"	Recurring	
Dottie Underwood	Bridget Regan	"Time and Tide"	Recurring	Recurring
Johann Fennhoff	Ralph Brown	"The Iron Ceiling"	Recurring	
Whitney Frost	Wynn Everett	"The Lady in the Lake"		Recurring
Jason Wilkes	Reggie Austin	"The Lady in the Lake"		Recurring
Calvin Chadwick	Currie Graham	"The Lady in the Lake"		Recurring
Ana Jarvis	Lotte Verbeek	"The Lady in the Lake"		Recurring
Aloysius Samberly	Matt Braunger	"The Lady in the Lake"		Recurring
Vernon Masters	Kurtwood Smith	"The Lady in the Lake"		Recurring
Joseph Manfredi	Ken Marino	"The Atomic Job"		Recurring

== Main characters ==
=== Peggy Carter ===
Margaret Elizabeth "Peggy" Carter (portrayed by Hayley Atwell) is an officer with the Strategic Scientific Reserve (SSR) who worked with Captain America during World War II, falling in love with him before he seemingly sacrificed himself to stop the Nazi-division Hydra. Following the end of the war, Carter is working in a secretarial role despite her status as an agent. Approached by Howard Stark, whom she had also worked with during the war, to help clear his name after being framed for selling weapons to the USSR, Carter agrees to go behind the backs of her superiors. Her treason is eventually discovered by Agent Daniel Sousa, but she is let off when she helps stop the Russians. She goes on to earn the respect of her coworkers, instigate the defeat of Whitney Frost, and start a relationship with Sousa.

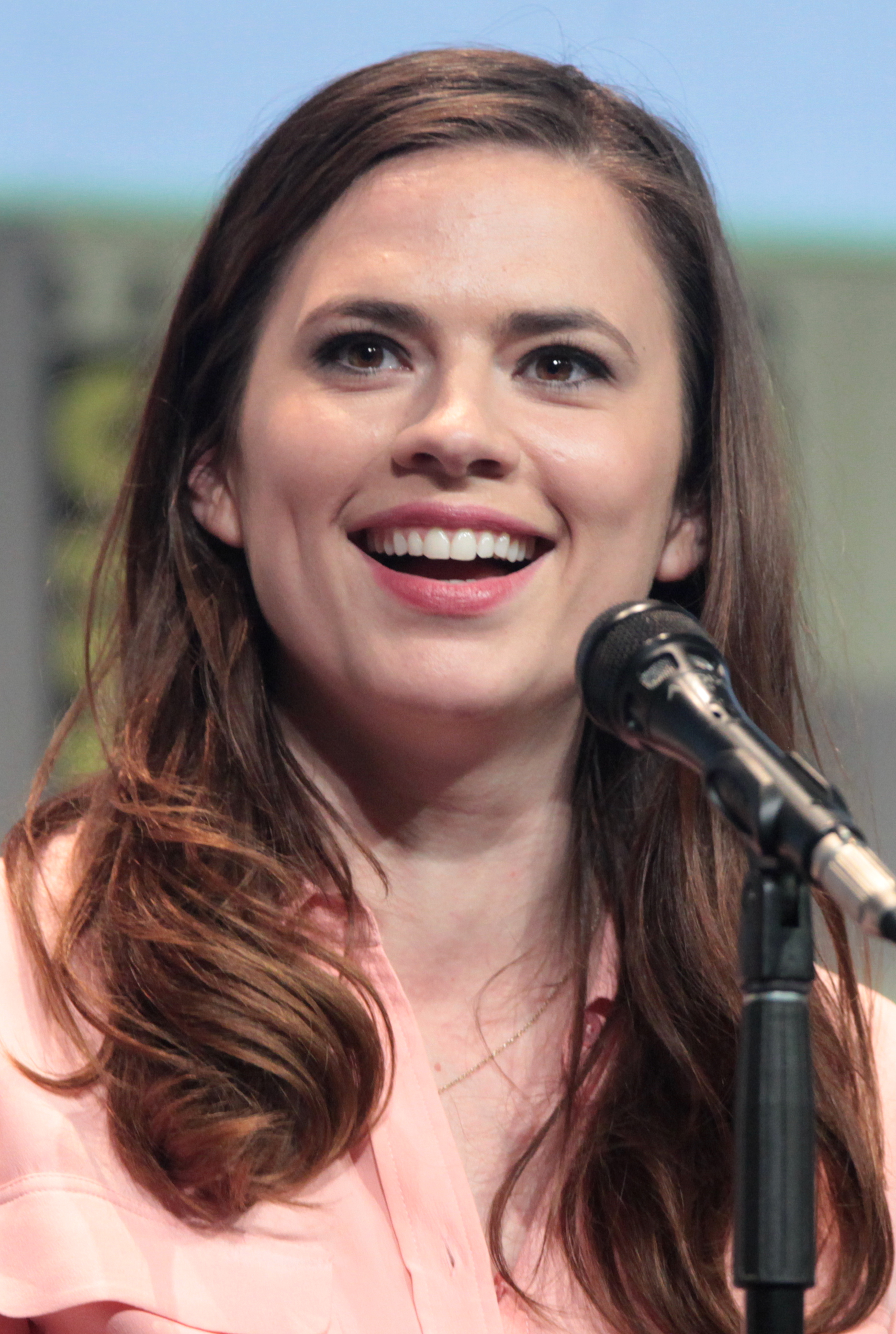
Hayley Atwell

Atwell, who portrayed Carter in Captain America: The First Avenger, Captain America: The Winter Soldier, and the Agent Carter short film, expressed interest in reprising the role for the series in October 2013; ABC Entertainment president Paul Lee confirmed her involvement in January 2014. Carter is the first female character to headline a standalone story as part of the Marvel Cinematic Universe (MCU), ahead of popular comic characters such as Natasha Romanoff and Carol Danvers. Unlike other major Marvel heroes, Carter does not have any superpowers, instead the writers "always said her superpower is the fact that other people underestimate her. And she often uses that to her advantage". Atwell said it was "thrilling" to explore "the backdrop of this male-dominated world, where women are still in the workforce, unspoken for and struggling to find a place outside the home" and how it affects Carter, who must deal with this along with the missions she receives. For Carter's costumes, though some vintage pieces were used, most of her outfits were custom made to accommodate the scripted action scenes. Costume designer Giovanna Ottobre-Melton gave the outfits an "hourglass style with strength in the tailoring and defined shoulders, but not overly exaggerated." For the character's tactical gear, World War II underground military looks were referenced. Gabriella Graves portrays a young Carter.

Speaking about the influence that the apparent death of Steve Rogers has on Carter, Atwell explained that "It's only been a year and she's grieving him and I think what keeps her going is he was the greatest person she ever knew ... she's also determined to make sure that his work wasn't in vain." Following the first season, Atwell noted that Carter did not "win everyone's respect", with Jack Thompson taking credit for her actions, for example, but "she knows her value so she doesn't need that praise". For the second season, executive producer Michele Fazekas explained that after Carter "put a lot of things emotionally to bed", such as letting go of Captain America, she is now "more open to looking at her life and figuring out, does she want a relationship?" Fazekas added that Carter would start to realize that "not everybody has her ideals", even in the SSR.

The A.V. Club named Atwell's performance as one of the "Best Individual Performances" of 2015. Atwell was also nominated for Best Actress in a Television Series at the 41st Saturn Awards, but lost the award to Caitriona Balfe of Outlander.

=== Edwin Jarvis ===
Edwin Jarvis (portrayed by James D'Arcy) was charged with treason during the war after he forged the signature of his superior officer in an attempt to save the woman that would become his wife, Ana. Saved from this by Howard Stark, Jarvis becomes Stark's butler and is eventually offered to Carter as support for her mission to clear Stark's name. Befriending Carter, Jarvis came to enjoy his missions with her and chose to continue to help her with missions unrelated to Stark, such as the fight against Whitney Frost. For this, Ana became involved as well, until she was seriously injured by Frost. In retaliation, Jarvis unsuccessfully attempted to murder Frost.

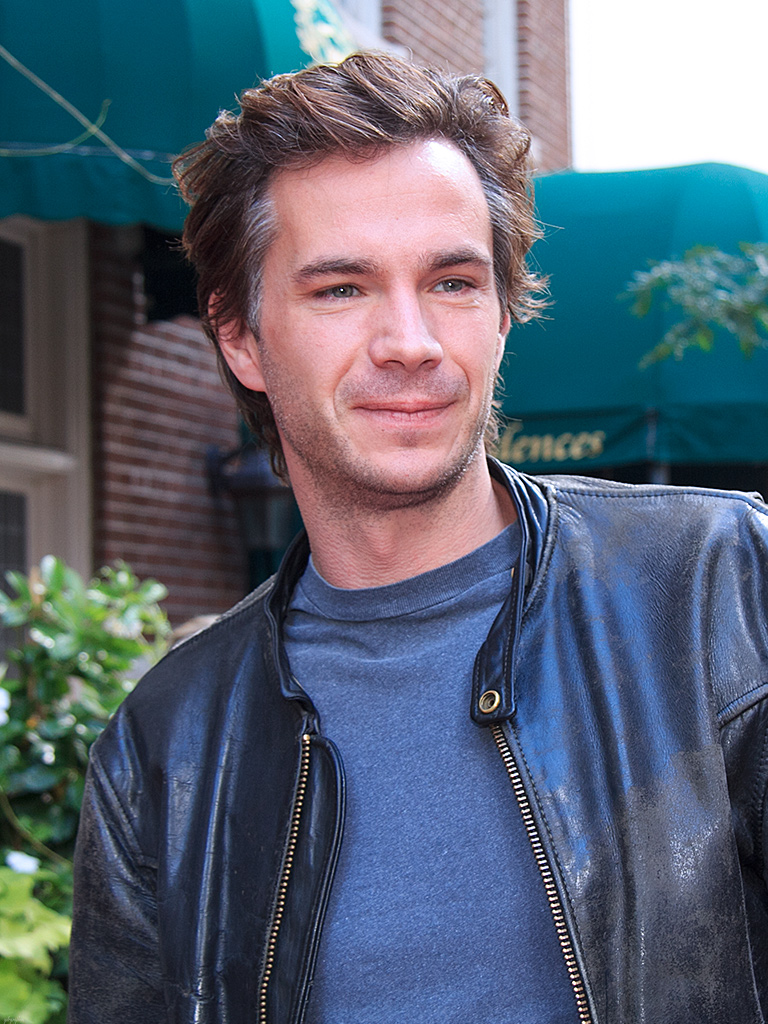
James D'Arcy

Edwin Jarvis was announced to be in the series in July 2014. A butler to the Stark family in the original comics, Jarvis was first adapted in the MCU films as an artificial intelligence named J.A.R.V.I.S., created by Tony Stark. The official tie-in comic Iron Man 2: Public Identity explained that a more comic-accurate version of the character did exist in the MCU, with the butler Jarvis serving as a mentor to a young Tony and eventually inspiring his A.I.; the Jarvis seen in Agent Carter is a younger version of this butler, working for Howard Stark before Tony is born. D'Arcy was cast in the role in September 2014. Fazekas, explaining the introduction and development of Jarvis in the series, stated that "some of it has come from the comics and some of it we've developed ourselves. Some of it is influenced by James D'Arcy himself and his strengths." D'Arcy was initially nervous about portraying Jarvis's comedic side, given his history of "predominantly play[ing] psychopaths", and did not study Paul Bettany's performance as J.A.R.V.I.S. when approaching the character. Ottobre-Melton explained, in terms of costume design, that "Jarvis is a tweed suit man. He has a large responsibility handling Howard Stark's affairs, and needs to look polished at all times. He's a well-paid employee who can afford custom-made 3-piece suits, and has a British sensibility, so we put him in a finely tailored bold black and grey Herringbone suit."

Atwell referred to Carter's relationship with Jarvis as the series' comic relief, while Fazekas called their relationship "the center relationship of the show". Executive producer Tara Butters compared the relationship to that of Fox Mulder and Dana Scully in the early seasons of The X-Files, where "you really believed they cared about each other but it wasn't sexual. That was very refreshing." Fazekas discussed giving Jarvis a major character arc in the second season, saying that he "really got a taste for adventure with Peggy in the first season, so, when she comes back into his life, he's so happy because he's so bored with being Howard Stark's butler ... what that starts is a really interesting story for him, which is, how much did he really understand about what Peggy does? For him, it's like a fun diversion, even though he's in danger ... we will see in Jarvis' story how he grows to understand that and where he comes out in the end. It will have a cost for him, and it will have an impact on his relationship with Peggy". D'Arcy reprised the role of Jarvis in the Marvel Studios film Avengers: Endgame (2019), and voiced an alternate version of the character in the Disney+ animated series What If...? episode "What If... Agatha Went to Hollywood?" (2024). He portrayed the human form of J.A.R.V.I.S. in the Disney+ miniseries VisionQuest (2026).

=== Jack Thompson ===
Jack Thompson (portrayed by Chad Michael Murray) is a war veteran and agent with the SSR who accidentally killed surrendering enemy soldiers, but hid the mistake, instead being praised as a hero. He takes the credit for Carter's work in defeating Leviathan, and is promoted to Chief of the New York SSR office. Thompson is shot by a mysterious person looking to take a redacted case file he has on "M. Carter".

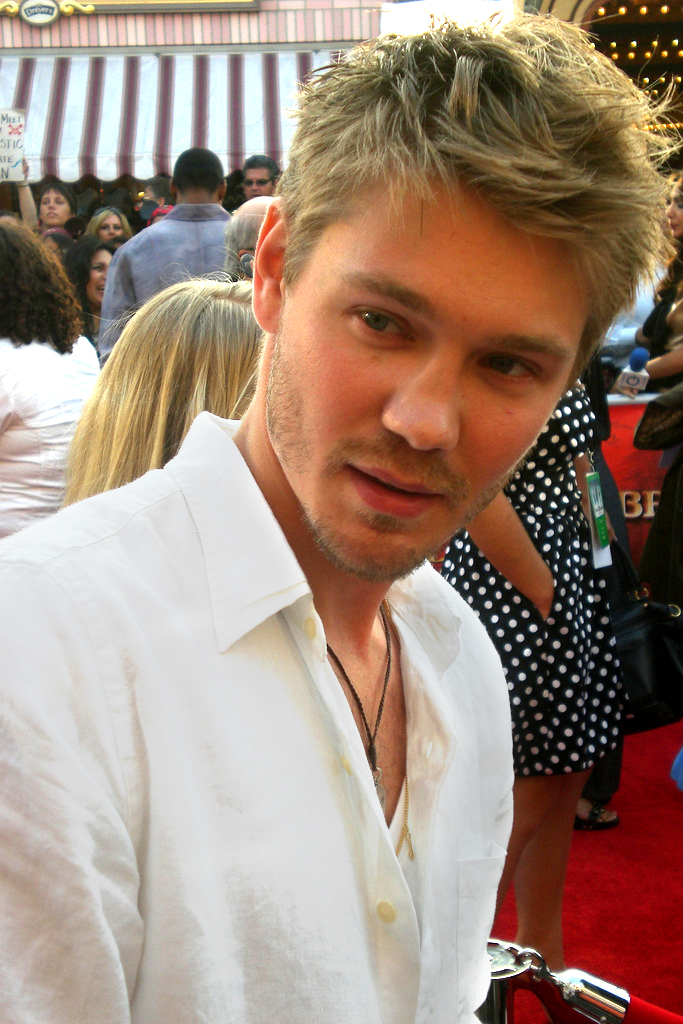
Chad Michael Murray

Murray was cast in August 2014. He noted that, unlike his character on One Tree Hill, Thompson does not serve as the "moral compass" of the series, which meant that he would not be "confined to a box" and would instead be allowed to "really play things up and do what's unexpected." The costumes for the SSR agents in the series are meant to be distinctive to help explain their characters: Thompson wears single breasted suits with suspenders. The second season ends on a cliffhanger, with Thompson being shot by an unknown character. The executive producers insisted that Thompson was not necessarily dead, and that his fate would be revealed in a potential third season.

Murray described the character as chauvinistic and "chest-puffing", and compared him to Indiana Jones, stating that "he's working his way up to become the head of the SSR. His goal in life is to just be great at his job. So he has a large chip on his shoulder, which gives him an attitude." Butters stated that "The problem with Thompson is, he's such an opportunist, and he so wants to succeed above all other things, that he sometimes makes bad choices. I think he's not a bad guy, he just gets blinded by ambition." On the character's second season arc, Fazekas reiterated that he "puts his ambition and his ego over other things, over sometimes doing the right thing, and he often doesn't care who gets hurt or who is upset about it ... [But] he actually decides to do the right thing in the end at great cost to himself."

=== Daniel Sousa ===
Daniel Sousa (portrayed by Enver Gjokaj) is a war veteran and agent with the SSR who experiences prejudice due to his crippled leg, for which he uses a crutch to support himself. Sousa's investigation leads to him discovering Carter's status as a traitor. His relationship with Carter becoming complicated, Sousa accepts the position of chief of the Los Angeles SSR office to get some distance from her, and eventually begins a new relationship with Violet. However, Violet leaves Sousa when she discovers that he still has feelings for Carter; Sousa eventually begins a relationship with Carter once they defeat Whitney Frost together.

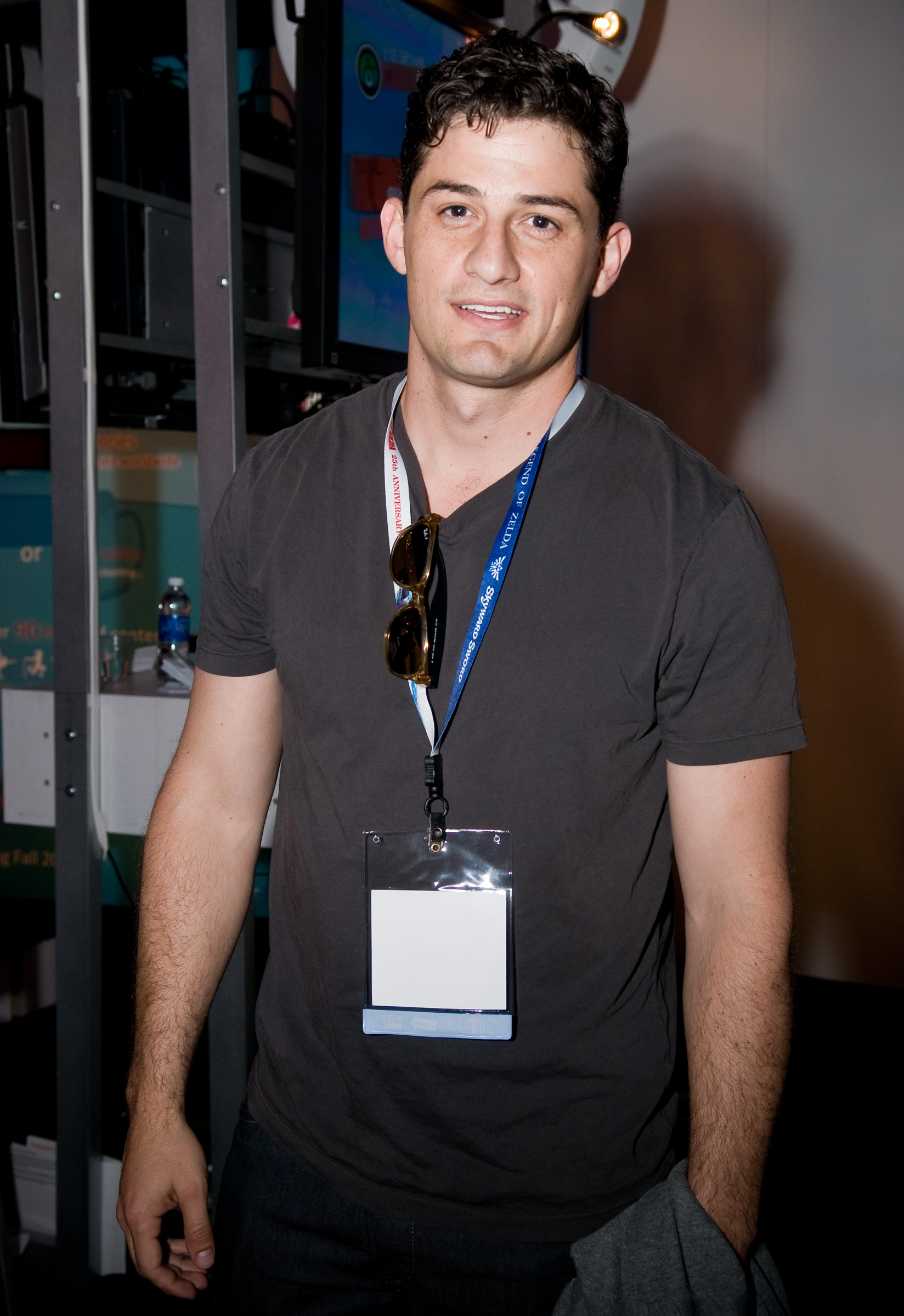
Enver Gjokaj

Gjokaj was cast in the role in August 2014. "He was a soldier, and he had been very active all his life, and now he has to figure out how to use his brains, how to try to be smart," Gjokaj explained of the character. "He accepts his injury, he accepts his compromised status in society ... Peggy says, 'Forget this. I'm Peggy Carter. I'm going to do something else.' I think that's the difference between the two of them." Considering a potentially romantic relationship between Sousa and Carter, Gjokaj said, "I think there's definitely a situation where ... if she hadn't dated Captain America, he might ask her out for a drink. It's like if your new girlfriend dated Ryan Gosling. It's going to make you sweat a bit." For the second season, Gjokaj said, "you'll see him deal with actually being part of the machine. Not trying to get into the machine, but being the boss. The first season was him trying to be listened to, and now he's being listened to by a lot of people." The costumes for the SSR agents in the series are meant to be distinctive to help explain their characters: Sousa wears "sweater vests under his sport coats and pleated pants".

Ahead of the second season, Fazekas explained that after Carter turned Sousa down at the end of the first season, saying "Oh, let me take a rain check. I have something to do", Carter felt like a potential relationship was something she could consider, while Sousa "felt like he missed an opportunity there." Because of that, Sousa moved to Los Angeles to avoid Carter, and "They haven't spoken since he left. There's that interesting awkward [feeling] when they start working together again. But now Sousa has got a girlfriend and it's very serious, so that's a new thing for Peggy to deal with." Though Sousa and Carter do eventually get together in the second-season finale, the executive producers warned that this did not necessarily mean Sousa is Carter's future husband, who was first mentioned in Captain America: The Winter Soldier. Gjokaj would reprise his role as Sousa during the seventh season of Agents of S.H.I.E.L.D.

=== Roger Dooley ===
Roger Dooley (portrayed by Shea Whigham) is the chief of the New York SSR office. After talking to Russian psychiatrist Johann Fennhoff about his marital issues, Dooley is hypnotized by the latter into aiding the Russians before being placed in an exploding vest designed by Stark. Dooley manages to jump out a nearby window before the vest explodes and kills him, saving the SSR agents.

In September 2014, Whigham was cast as Dooley, for the first seven episodes of the series, since the character is killed off during the first season's penultimate episode. This decision was made to help build stakes for the series given that "everyone knows Peggy lives". The costumes for the SSR agents in the series are meant to be distinctive to help explain their characters: Dooley wears "the classic 1940s double-breasted looks. Many of his closet pieces are sourced 1940s vintage suits."

Dooley is not a well established character in the comics, so Whigham created his own background for him, feeling that "Dooley is [not] a political appointee. I think I worked my way up through good hard work." Unlike many of the other agents, Whigham believes that Dooley does respect Carter, saying "I think he likes her. I think he cares deeply. I'm not sure that he can always show that". When asked whether Dooley's death was what brings Carter and the other SSR agents together, Fazekas said that this was not necessarily the case, as Carter had already begun to earn that herself, but she did feel that it "sort of focuses everyone and affects everyone".

== Recurring characters ==
The following is a list of guest characters that have recurring roles throughout the series. The characters are listed by the MCU media or season in which they first appeared.

=== Introduced in films ===
==== Howard Stark ====
Howard Stark (portrayed by Dominic Cooper) is a weapons developer who is framed for selling weapons to America's enemies. One of the weapons he created during the war was Midnight Oil, designed to give soldiers extra stamina during war, but instead it caused psychosis and led to them killing each other. The U.S. military stole Midnight Oil and used it on the Russians, and Fennhoff blames Stark for the ensuing massacre. Fennhoff hypnotises Stark into bombing New York, but Carter is able to convince Stark to stop. He moves on to set up his own film studio in Los Angeles.

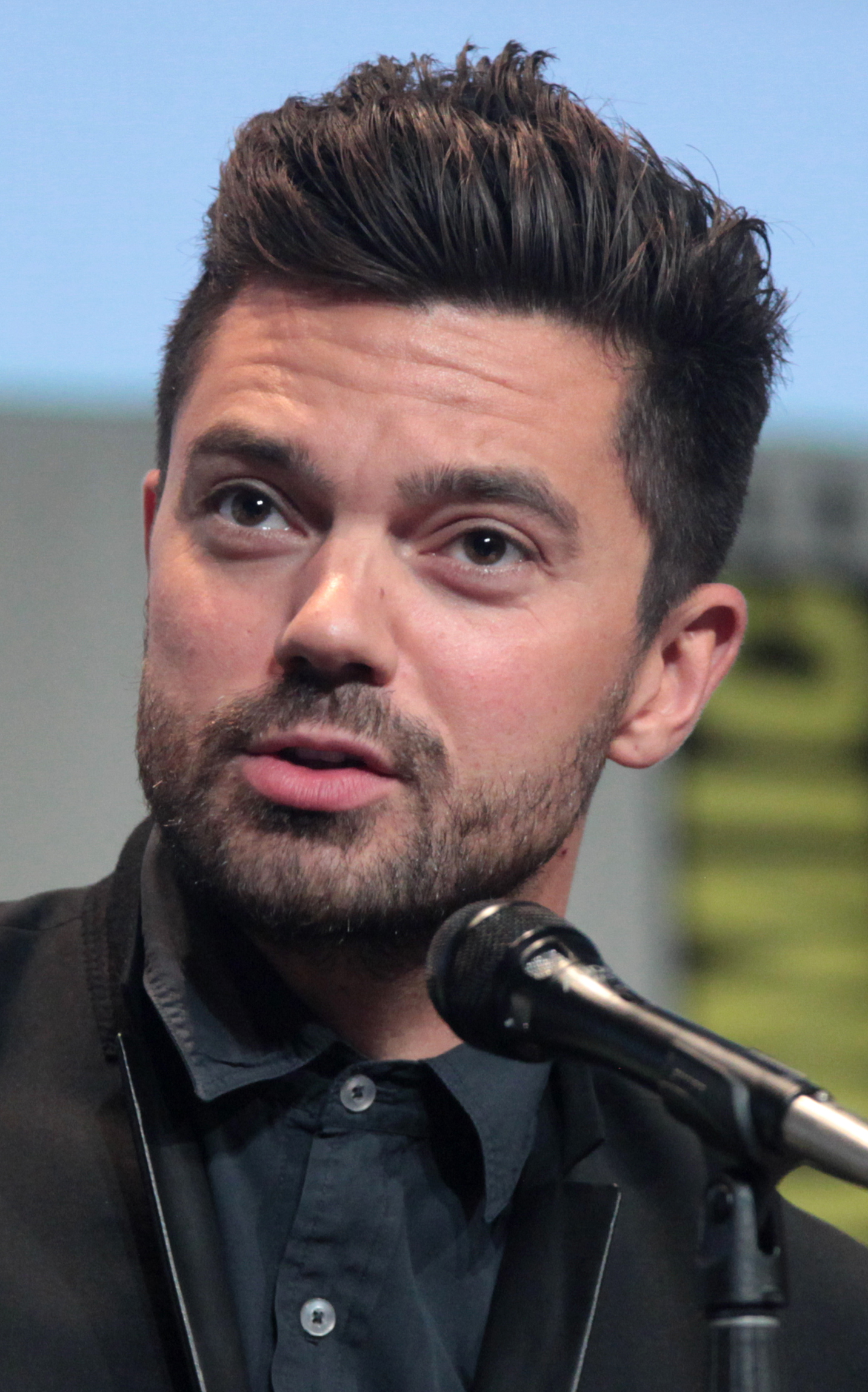
Dominic Cooper

In March 2014, Markus and McFeely stated that Howard Stark, the father of Tony Stark, CEO of Stark Industries, and a founding member of S.H.I.E.L.D., would be a recurring character in Agent Carter contingent on Cooper's willingness to reprise the role from The First Avenger and short film. In June 2014, Atwell confirmed that Cooper would be involved with the series. Ottobre-Melton designed Stark's outfits with his fugitive-status in mind, aiming to have him look "rich, comfortable, and sexy all rolled up into one." Stark doesn't wear a tie while on the run, unlike many men during the time, and tends to wear casual shirts with custom made jackets and vintage pants.

In describing the character, Cooper said "You don't know what he does in the depths of the evening, and he's gallivanting around." He continued, "I love dipping into ... some of that material of Howard Hughes, which I'm sure he's kind of been likened to", and described his biggest challenge in playing the character as "keeping it very realistic, but at the same time, tongue-in-cheek as well", and not making Stark "too broad". On Carter and Stark's relationship moving into the second season, Atwell said, "there's a new comfort level between Stark and Peggy ... they're on a bit more of an even level. She respects him hugely, but is also not afraid to comment on his lifestyle choices and how disgustingly misogynistic she finds him ... he does use women as a form of escapism for him and his Dionysian ways, but when it comes to Peggy, he doesn't see her as big boobs and red lips. He sees her as someone he can actually have a proper conversation with. Which probably scares the hell out of him".

In the first-season finale, the creators ensured that Stark spoke of Steve Rogers as "the greatest thing [he] ever did". This was done to set up the former's obsession with super soldier serums and identify "something/someone he's prouder of than his own son", which pays off in Captain America: Civil War: in the film, Stark is shown still attempting to recreate his super soldier serum in the 1990s; also, his love for Rogers adds to the antagonistic relationship between the latter and Tony.

Cooper was nominated for Best Guest Performance in a Television Series at the 41st Saturn Awards, and for Best Guest Actor in a Drama Series at the 19th Online Film & Television Association Awards. He lost the awards to Wentworth Miller (for The Flash) and Jonathan Pryce (for Game of Thrones), respectively.

=== Introduced in season one ===
==== Angie Martinelli ====
Angie Martinelli (portrayed by Lyndsy Fonseca) is a waitress and aspiring actress who befriends Carter.

Fonseca was drawn to Martinelli's "funky personality", which differed from her much more serious previous role of Alexandra Udinov on Nikita. Fonseca and Atwell discussed keeping their characters as friends, rather than falling to "jealousy or cattiness. There's nothing but just support and interest and friendship, because a lot of times it's more complicated than that on shows." By July 2015, Fonseca was negotiating to return for the second season, and that December she was revealed to be returning for a dream sequence in "A Little Song and Dance". Fazekas said that Angie's appearance in the sequence is her acting as Carter's conscience, "speaking the things that Peggy maybe can't say to herself. It ties things back together from the first season and it's connecting all of these things in a way that only a dream can do."

==== Ray Krzeminski ====
Ray Krzeminski (portrayed by Kyle Bornheimer) is a misogynistic SSR agent who clashes with Carter, until he is killed by Dottie Underwood.

Bornheimer was cast in the recurring role by October 2014, as part of the series "stocking up on male counterparts" for Carter to deal with throughout the series. In terms of costume design, Ottobre-Melton described Krzeminski as "a bit of a slob with his sport jacket, and open collar shirts." After the character's death, Butters explained that Carter would feel guilty about it moving forward, as it was her decisions that "inadvertently put Krzeminski at risk". His death also affected the series in general, with Fazekas explaining, "The stakes have changed now, they've gotten a lot more serious. The episodes that come subsequently really reflect that".

==== Rose Roberts ====
Rose Roberts (portrayed by Lesley Boone) is a switchboard operator who works for the SSR in New York and later in Los Angeles.

Discussing Rose's increased role in the second season, after making brief guest appearances in the first, Fazekas stated that the opportunity presented itself to "bring [Rose] out to L.A." for the second season, in order for Carter to have another person to talk to, "who knows her secrets and knows a lot about what's going on." Boone called Rose "a little bit of a bestie," trying to get information from Carter and Sousa to help "move things along" since she sees an attraction between the two. For the second season, Rose goes into the field, with Boone saying, "She gets recruited and she is beside herself excited that she gets to go out there and be a bad woman. I think she's quite capable."

==== Miriam Fry ====
Miriam Fry (portrayed by Meagen Fay) is the strict proprietor of The Griffith Hotel for Women, a boarding house where Carter lives.

Fay was cast as the woman in charge of the boarding house where Carter lives in October 2014, set for a minimum four-episode arc. Fay and the Griffith Hotel were introduced as a way to have more female characters in the series, as "We were troublingly dominated by men given that [Carter] was the only woman working in the SSR". The Griffith was based on the Barbizon Hotel for Women, one of the places in New York that "were considered safe places for women to live in the big city."

==== Dottie Underwood ====
Dorothy "Dottie" Underwood (portrayed by Bridget Regan) is a Russian sleeper agent disguised as a small-town girl from Iowa who moves next door to Carter. She reveals her true allegiance in an attempt to capture Carter, and later escapes after being defeated in a fight with the latter. Dottie resurfaces in an attempt to raid a bank account, only to be stopped by Carter and the SSR. She is taken into FBI custody until Carter breaks her out to help her defeat Whitney Frost.

One of Underwood's dresses from the series, on display. The red and black colors are a nod to the character's Black Widow status.

Underwood was created to give Carter a "strong female antagonist", and Butters noted that "we said, wouldn't it be great to have one of those people who is living right there with her be actually a bad guy?" In late January 2015, Butters and Fazekas revealed that Underwood is a product of the precursor to the Black Widow program. Regan did not know the character was a Black Widow when auditioning, but quickly learned after being cast, as the showrunners wanted her to change her then current red hair, order to avoid being "a tip to the audience, because of Natasha [Romanoff]. They didn't want to imply that every Black Widow had red hair and they didn't want the audience to see it coming." Regan trained with a Taekwondo expert and studied Scarlett Johansson's Black Widow choreography from the films in preparation for the character's fight scenes, while Ottobre-Melton referenced her Black Widow status by using the colors red and black. Underwood's initial "small-town girl from Iowa" persona was based on Judy Garland's Dorothy Gale from The Wizard of Oz.

Butters and Fazekas stated that Underwood "doesn't quite understand what it's like to be a normal woman" after her upbringing in the program, and is intrigued by Carter. Regan elaborated that "she's never seen anyone like [Carter] before and she's never been beaten before. There's this competitive but playful obsession with her" which is seen with Underwood's "flirtation" and "feminine prowess". Regan continued, "She knows that to be on top she has to beat Peggy ... So Dottie does want to get under her skin. She tries to make her feel uncomfortable and that might be with a look or a glance or what she says." Atwell said, "Peggy has male baddies that she fights, but to have someone who is physically her equal—she's a Black Widow, incredibly capable and very smart—I think that shows some balance for Peggy, like a flip side of the same coin." After Carter defeats Underwood and Leviathan in the first season, Underwood becomes "a lone wolf ... she's a woman without a country right now, but she is more involved in the [overarching] case" for the second season than it initially appears.

==== Johann Fennhoff ====
Johann Fennhoff (portrayed by Ralph Brown) is a Russian hypnotist working for Leviathan, whose brother died from the effects of Stark's chemical weapon Midnight Oil. Fennhoff infiltrates the SSR under the guise of rescued psychiatrist Dr. Ivchenko, and steals Midnight Oil for himself. He then tries to use hypnosis to make Stark spread Midnight Oil over New York, but is defeated by Carter and the SSR. He is arrested, gagged, and imprisoned with Arnim Zola.

Fennhoff's history as Doctor Faustus in the comics is referenced in the series, with him shown reading Christopher Marlowe's The Tragical History of the Life and Death of Doctor Faustus. Having Faustus meet Zola was intended to set up Hydra's use of mind control for the Winter Soldier program, as seen in Captain America: The Winter Soldier. Hydra's system of brainwashing and mind control is also seen in the series Agents of S.H.I.E.L.D., where it is referred to as the Faustus Method.

=== Introduced in season two ===
==== Whitney Frost ====
Whitney Frost (portrayed by Wynn Everett) is the stage name of Agnes Cully, an actress and scientific genius forced to hide behind her husband, senatorial candidate Calvin Chadwick, due to the sexism of the age. She accidentally absorbs Zero Matter, which leaves her with a Zero Matter scar on her forehead, and the ability to absorb any living thing she touches. After she is purged of the Zero Matter, Frost goes insane and is committed to an asylum.

In August 2015, Butters and fellow executive producer Chris Dingess stated that Madame Masque would appear in the season, and that an actress had been cast in the role. Everett was confirmed to be playing the character that October. After being cast and seeing a picture of the comic version of the character, Everett felt "'They got the wrong girl,' only because I look nothing like her. I was very nervous about it ... [and] thought, 'They will probably dye my hair dark, and I'm going to need to work out a bit. And those are some pretty big boobs.'" However, the producers were looking to take a different approach to the character, taking inspiration from "Hollywood icons like Hedy Lamarr and Lauren Bacall". The character also does not wear the gold mask from the comics, though the show does reference this, with masks appearing in the background of many scenes featuring Frost. Ivy George and Olivia Welch portray younger versions of Cully during her time growing up in Broxton, Oklahoma.

Makeup artist Robin Beauchesne applying special prosthetics to Wynn Everett to depict Whitney Frost's Zero Matter "crack"

Series head of make-up Debra LaMia Denaver explained that for the Zero Matter "wound" on Frost's face, the "guidelines were for it to be like a cracked porcelain doll and then the black matter would come from inside out. From there, Jay [Wejebe, makeup artist] designed the prosthetics that we use and Robin [Beauchesne, key makeup artist] created all the different avenues the dark matter takes." Using reference photographs and pre-made prosthetics, the make-up team were ultimately able to apply the effect to Everett in 30 minutes. The "crack" was then augmented with visual effects, to add depth, sentience, and an "infinite black" by color-correcting the image, with the effects animators studying "cracking glass to better capture the animation effect."

Fazekas said that, "Whitney is used to people treating her with a certain amount of deference, because she's a famous actress, and she's met her match in Peggy." She added that in the series, "You see the makings of a villain, but she doesn't start off evil. She starts off manipulative and not the nicest person you've ever met, but she's not a bad guy when you first meet her." Fazekas additionally noted how the sexist themes of the times were handled, by showing "that the only way Whitney Frost felt she could exert power in the world was through her husband, because she had been told her whole life, 'Nobody cares how smart you are, they care about how pretty you are.'" On Frost's relationship with Chadwick, Everett called him "her best friend. And like many friends and family, you end up [fighting], but he's always there ... he knows I can do what I say I can do, especially in the science world. So he's really the only one who gets me."

==== Jason Wilkes ====
Jason Wilkes (portrayed by Reggie Austin) is a scientist for Isodyne, the only company willing to hire him as a black man, who informs Carter of the company's Zero Matter discovery. He is rendered invisible and intangible following exposure to the substance, and under its influence he attempts to take drastic steps to gain power. He expresses remorse for his actions after the Zero Matter is eventually purged from his body and he regains tangibility.

Austin joined the cast as Wilkes in October 2015. Wilkes, who originates from the comics, was changed to a black character for the series, which allowed the series to address racism during the 1940s. On the race of the character, Austin said "it does play a factor. It can't not, really. It's Los Angeles—or [rather], America—in 1947. So race does play a factor". Butters added, "We wanted to tell a rich story around [the blatant racism that existed] and not feel like you're preaching about it, you know, 'Racism is not good.'" For when the character becomes intangible following exposure to Zero Matter, the series' science adviser theoretical physicist Clifford Johnson explained that the substance introduces the idea of moving in "another direction" from what is usually possible, and so Wilkes's intangibility is actually the Zero Matter taking him "somewhat off, towards the place it came from" in another dimension. Austin noted that this experience causes both fear and curiosity in Wilkes, and forces his role in the series to be more cerebral rather than action-focused as he is relegated to explaining science and planning until he regains his tangibility.

On how Wilkes connects to Carter, Austin said Wilkes is "one of the top scientists in his field [working at Isodyne], but he's had to work hard to get there. It's sort of a similar struggle of an African-American and a woman in the 1940s to try to succeed, so I think that they both see that in one another and that's part of where the chemistry and connection comes from." Expanding on the love triangle that forms between Wilkes, Sousa, and Carter, Austin said, "we're very nice to each other. We're professional. I think that Sousa likes Wilkes enough and it's the same the other way".

==== Calvin Chadwick ====
Calvin Chadwick (portrayed by Currie Graham) is Frost's husband, the owner of Isodyne Energy and secret member of the Council of Nine. He is a senatorial candidate for the Council, until he tries to turn over the powered-Frost to the Council out of fear; Frost absorbs him in retaliation.

Graham was announced as cast in the role in October 2015. He compared his relationship to Frost to that of Bill and Hillary Clinton, calling them "a power couple" and adding, "I think that Chadwick was probably attracted to her because of her beauty, [but she's] also a very smart woman, very successful, also probably a Type A. We really strive, both of us I think, as a very successful actress and with a very successful business[man]. The world is our oyster. We're going to make as many pearls as we can."

==== Ana Jarvis ====
Ana Jarvis (portrayed by Lotte Verbeek) is the free-spirited and quirky wife of Edwin Jarvis who quickly befriends Carter. She is wounded by Whitney Frost, resulting in internal complications that render her unable to have children.

The character was featured entirely off screen in the first season, often as a "disembodied voice". In July 2015, she was revealed to be physically appearing in the second season, and Verbeek was cast in the role by October 2015. Verbeek was in Europe when she auditioned for and got the part, and Agent Carter had not yet begun airing there, so Verbeek "didn't really know anything. I just talked to the showrunners, what is it about, what is the character about." Verbeek wanted to play more than just "the wife of", and noted that her take on the character is "somewhat unexpected with Jarvis being who he is ... Ana just brings a whole different dimension to him." Verbeek, who is Dutch, has "spent a lot of time in Budapest", which helped with the character's Hungarian accent.

On creating the character, Fazekas said the writers "wanted to be really specific about who the woman is that Jarvis is just madly in love with" in order to highlight the strong, platonic relationship Jarvis has with Carter. Fazekas added, "It makes sense in that, Jarvis likes Peggy Carter, so of course the woman he's in love with would not be a quiet, prim and proper lady ... We also wanted to be very clear that Peggy and Ana really like each other, and that there's no jealousy from Ana. Ana and Jarvis are so comfortable in their relationship, they're not going to be jealous of other people coming in and out of their lives." On some of the differences between Ana and Edwin, Verbeek said, "The first scene we had I walk in and I smack him on his ass, which is a sort of sexual, playful, fun thing they have. That's not something he would do, that's something she does, and he loves it." D'Arcy later revealed that Verbeek had improvised this on their first day on set, after having "just flown in", calling it "brilliantly courageous ... to do it to an actor you don't know" and "so perfectly what they were hoping that Ana would be like."

==== Aloysius Samberly ====
Aloysius Samberly (portrayed by Matt Braunger) is an SSR lab tech who eventually goes out into the field with Carter, Sousa, Jarvis and Roberts to help them retrieve old atomic bombs at Roxxon Oil. He then assists them in defeating Frost.

Fazekas called him "a comedy guy, who plays the lab tech who is kind of disgruntled. He feels like, 'You agents, you just look down your nose at the lab techs,' and he's a thorn in Sousa's side. He's so funny because everything he says is completely earnest, but hilarious. He just annoys everyone ... [But] he also has his little hero moments as well." Butters called Braunger "a great comic addition to our cast."

==== Vernon Masters ====
Vernon Masters (portrayed by Kurtwood Smith) is a veteran of the War Department and subordinate of the Council of Nine, he was Thompson's mentor and boss in the War Department, and manipulates Thompson into doing the bidding of the Council.

In October 2015, Smith was cast in the "major recurring role" of Masters for the second season, having previously worked with Butters and Fazekas on their television series Resurrection. Though the executive producers never thought that they would be able to get Smith for the series, they developed and wrote Masters with the actor in mind. The character was intended to be killed off at the end of the season, and a version of that was filmed, but the writers ultimately decided to leave Masters' fate "ambiguous" as they enjoyed working with Smith, with Fazekas saying, "The nice thing about that is we could go both ways on it. Maybe we never see him again or maybe we see him again and by the way he's full of Zero Matter now. The last thing you saw was Whitney Zero Mattering him and then getting interrupted. But it's still in him. Either way, we wanted to keep our options open."

==== Joseph Manfredi ====
Joseph Manfredi (portrayed by Ken Marino) is the leader of the Maggia crime syndicate branch in Los Angeles who aids Frost, having previously dated her. He is also an old acquaintance of Howard Stark, and helps Stark and the SSR defeat Frost when she begins losing her mind to the Zero Matter.

Marino was cast in November 2015, on which Fazekas said, "He's obviously very funny, but he also is a great dramatic actor. We had talked about him for a different role, but it was too small of a role. Then we knew we wanted him in [the] Manfredi role. So that role became so much bigger because it was Ken." About the character, Fazekas added, "What I love about Manfredi is he's funny, he can flip on a dime and be a total psycho, and he is madly in love with Whitney and genuinely so—even when she's cuckoo. Their scenes together, there's such a tenderness to them". Since the character differs from its comic counterpart, Marino said "the two things [vital to the character]" were defining that Manfredi "definitely was the muscle for Whitney, and that he did have a true love for her." Marino wanted to make sure Manfredi "felt like he was an old-school tough guy" and felt that Frost was "the one true love for him", comparing their relationship to Joe DiMaggio and Marilyn Monroe's.

== Guest characters ==
The following is a supplementary list of guest stars that appear in lesser roles or make significant cameo appearances. The characters are listed by the MCU media or season in which they first appeared.

=== Introduced in films ===
- Anton Vanko (portrayed by Costa Ronin, first in season one): Co-creator of the arc reactor with Howard Stark.
- Timothy "Dum Dum" Dugan (portrayed by Neal McDonough, first in season one): Leader of the Howling Commandos.
- Arnim Zola (portrayed by Toby Jones, first in season one): A Hydra scientist and prisoner of the SSR with Fennhoff.

=== Introduced in season one ===
- Leet Brannis (portrayed by James Frain): An ex-Leviathan operative who steals Stark's inventions.
- Jerome Zandow (portrayed by Rob Mars): A former Coney Island strong man, now a thug for hire.
- Sasha Demidov (portrayed by James Landry Hébert): A Leviathan operative.
- Colleen O'Brien (portrayed by Ashley Hinshaw): Carter's roommate who is murdered by Demidov.
- Miles Van Ert (portrayed by James Urbaniak): A Roxxon Oil scientist.
- Yauch (portrayed by Alexander Carroll): An SSR agent hypnotized by Fennhoff.
- Hugh Jones (portrayed by Ray Wise): The president of Roxxon Oil who is on the Council of Nine
- Sheldon McFee (portrayed by Devin Ratray): A truck driver bribed to aid Brannis.
- Radio announcer (portrayed by Ralph Garman)
- "Captain America" radio actor and "Kid Colt" film actor (portrayed by Walker Roach)
- "Betty Carver" radio actress (portrayed by Erin Torpey)
- Otto Mink (portrayed by Gregory Sporleder): A black market smuggler. Killed by Underwood before he can kill Carter.
- Alex Doobin (portrayed by Kevin Cotteleer): An SSR scientist.
- Samuel "Happy Sam" Sawyer (portrayed by Leonard Roberts): A Howling Commando.
- Nikola (portrayed by Alex Veadov): A Russian scientist and Leviathan prisoner.
- Percival "Pinky" Pinkerton (portrayed by Richard Short): A Howling Commando.
- Jonathan "Junior" Juniper (portrayed by James Austin Kerr): A Howling Commando who is killed by a young Leviathan trainee.

Stan Lee and John Glover make cameo appearances as a shoeshiner patron and a journalist friend of Dooley, respectively. Chris Evans appears as Steve Rogers / Captain America via archive footage from Captain America: The First Avenger.

=== Introduced in season two ===
- Violet (portrayed by Sarah Bolger): Sousa's new girlfriend in Los Angeles. She leaves him after learning of his feelings for Carter.
- Andrew Henry (portrayed by Sean O'Bryan): An LAPD homicide detective exposed to Zero Matter.
- Isodyne receptionist (portrayed by Angela Cristantello)
- Rufus Hunt (portrayed by Chris Browning): A Council of Nine hitman.
- Torrance (portrayed by John Balma): An Arena Club host.
- Vega (portrayed by Rey Valentin): An SSR agent under Sousa.
- Thomas Gloucester (portrayed by Casey Sander): A businessman on the Council of Nine.
- Amanda Carter (portrayed by Carole Ruggier): Peggy Carter's mother.
- Michael Carter (portrayed by Max Brown as an adult, Webb Baker Hayes as a boy): Peggy's brother, who is killed in World War II. This convinces her to join the Special Operations Executive.
- Wilma Cully (portrayed by Samaire Armstrong): Whitney Frost's mother.
- Bud Schultz (portrayed by Chris Mulkey): Wilma Cully's lover.
- Edwards (portrayed by Christopher Grove): An instructor of Peggy's at Bletchley Park.
- Fred Wells (portrayed by Kevin Changaris): Peggy's ex fiancé.
- Mortimer Hayes (portrayed by John Kerry): A newspaper mogul on the Council of Nine.
- Nonna Manfredi (portrayed by Tina D'Marco): Joseph Manfredi's grandmother.
- Chung (portrayed by Tom T. Choi): Ana Jarvis's doctor in a hospital.

Louis van Amstel, Dmitry Chaplin, Karina Smirnoff, Anna Trebunskaya, Sasha Farber, and Damian Whitewood, professional dancers on Dancing with the Stars, make cameo appearances as dancers in Peggy's dream in "A Little Song and Dance".

== See also ==
- List of Marvel Cinematic Universe television series actors (ABC)
