= Sgt. Fury and his Howling Commandos =

Comic book series

- Sgt. Fury and his Howling Commandos #1 (May 1963). Cover art by Jack Kirby and Dick Ayers.

Publication information
- Publisher: Marvel Comics
- Format: Ongoing
- Publication date: May 1963 – Dec. 1981
- No. of issues: 167
- Main character(s): Sgt. Fury; Izzy Cohen; Dum Dum Dugan; Gabe Jones; Junior Juniper; Eric Koenig; Dino Manelli; Pinky Pinkerton; Rebel Ralston

Creative team
- Created by: Stan Lee; Jack Kirby
- Written by: Stan Lee (1-28, Annual #1); Roy Thomas (29-41, Annual #2); Gary Friedrich (42–57, 59–73, 75–76, 83, 94, 96–98, 100, 102, 104, 106, 108, 110, 112, 115–116, Annual #3–4, 6)
- Penciller(s): Jack Kirby; Dick Ayers
- Inker(s): Dick Ayers; George Roussos; John Severin

Sgt. Fury and his Howling Commandos is a comic book series created by Jack Kirby and Stan Lee and published by Marvel Comics from 1963 to 1981. The main character, Sgt. Nick Fury, later became the leader of Marvel's super-spy agency, S.H.I.E.L.D. The title also featured the Howling Commandos, a fictional World War II unit that first appeared in Sgt. Fury and his Howling Commandos #1 (cover dated May 1963).

== Publication history ==
Stan Lee has described the series Sgt. Fury and his Howling Commandos as having come about due to a bet with his publisher, Martin Goodman that the Lee-Kirby style could make a book sell even with the worst title Lee could devise. Lee elaborated on that claim in a 2007 interview, responding to the suggestion that the series title did not necessarily seem bad:

It did at the time. First of all, it was too long for a title — we didn't have any that were six words. And "Howling" was a long word, and "Commandos" was a long word. I got the name "Howling Commandos" because in the Army there was a group called the Screaming Eagles. And I loved the sound of that. So I figured we'd have the Howling Commandos.

Comics-artist contemporary John Severin recalled in an interview conducted in the early 2000s that in the late 1950s, Kirby had approached him to be partners on a syndicated, newspaper comic strip "set in Europe during World War Two; the hero would be a tough, cigar-chomping sergeant with a squad of oddball GIs — sort of an adult Boy Commandos", referring to a 1940s wartime "kid gang" comics series Kirby had co-created for DC Comics.

Sgt. Fury and his Howling Commandos followed an elite special unit, the First Attack Squad, nicknamed the "Howling Commandos", which was stationed in a military base in England to fight missions primarily, but not exclusively, in the European theatre of World War II. Under Captain "Happy Sam" Sawyer, Fury was the cigar-chomping noncom who led the racially and ethnically integrated unit (racial integration was unusual for the then-segregated U.S. military, though possible in elite special forces units). Lee was obliged to send a memo to the color separator at the printing plant to confirm that the character Gabe Jones was African American, after the character had appeared with Caucasian coloring in the first issue.

The series ran 167 issues (May 1963 - Dec. 1981), though with reprints alternating with new stories from issue #80 (Sept. 1970), and only in reprints after issue #120 (July 1974); at this point the formal copyrighted title in the indicia, which had been simply Sgt. Fury, was changed to match the trademarked cover logo, Sgt. Fury and his Howling Commandos. Following seven issues by creators Lee and Kirby (who returned to collaborate on #13 and on the opening and closing pages of #18), penciller Dick Ayers began his long stint on what would be his signature series, penciling 95 issues, including two extra-length annuals. John Severin later joined as inker, forming a long-running, award-winning team; he would, additionally, both pencil and ink issues #44-46. The series' only other pencilers came on one issue each by Tom Sutton (which Ayers said was "done that time I asked for a furlough and reassignment") and Herb Trimpe ("They shuffled Trimpe and me around, [him] to Fury and [me] and Severin to [The Incredible] Hulk" Ayers recalled.)

Roy Thomas followed Lee as writer, himself followed by Gary Friedrich, for whom this also became a signature series. Ayers said in 1977, "Stan Lee left Fury first to Roy Thomas because the superheroes were gaining in popularity at that time it was best he concentrate on them", referring to the young Marvel's then growing line of superhero comics, such as Fantastic Four and The Amazing Spider-Man. "I must admit I resented somewhat those superheroes taking Stan away from Fury!"

Friedrich began as a co-scripter of issues #42-44 (May–July 1967). The Friedrich-Ayers-Severin team began in earnest, however, with #45 (Aug. 1967), the first of what would be several of the series' "The" stories: "The War Lover", a shaded exploration of a trigger-happy soldier and the line drawn, even in war, between killing and murder. Daring for the time, when majority public sentiment still supported the undeclared Vietnam War, the story balanced present-day issues while demonstrating that even in what is referred to as "a just war", a larger morality prevails. As one writer in the 1970s observed,

...Sgt. Fury #45 took a firm moralistic stance for the rest of the series by premiering what would become one of the most acclaimed series of stories in comics: the Gary Friedich "The" series, beginning with "The War Lover". ... Future stories in that fashion — all but one written by Friedrich — would center on what war could do to "The Assassin" (#51), the tragedy of a man turned hired liquidator, his family held hostage by Hitler's Gestapo; "The Informer" (#57), an observation on loyalty and trust, staged in a German POW camp; "The Peacemonger" (#64) [about a World War II conscientious objector]; "The Deserter" (#75), an allusion to the real-life execution of Private Eddie Slovik; "The All-American" (#81), Al Kurzrok's tale of a man [caught] between the twin microcosms of sport and war; and ultimately, "The Reporter" (#110), an account of a journalist faced with the [question of] when might a human life be forfeit? Many feel, also, that #46's tale, "They Also Serve", should be included ... for that story might as easily have been called "The Medic"....

Sgt. Fury #57 (Aug. 1968), featuring a Friedrich "The" story. Cover art by Dick Ayers & John Severin.

At his best, Ayers' art in Sgt. Fury showed "a clear, forthright storyteller, excellent in medium close shots with a subtly out-of-focus background. He blended large panels with thin or small ones for movement, and often provided vast, cinemascopic panoramas for his writers to work with.... [E]ven in a scene that would ordinarily be static you could feel his characters breathing." Inker Severin "took the art even further, laying dark, scratchy inks" that gave grit to Ayers' pencils. Ayers himself "liked the results of John Severin's work on Sgt. Fury immensely", he said in 1977. "He added details beyond what I'd put in. He always seemed to go one step beyond."

Friedrich continued through #83 (Jan. 1971), with the late part of this run having reprint issues alternating with new stories. He returned for the even-numbered issues from #94-114 (Jan. 1972 - Nov. 1973).

Sgt. Fury ran concurrently with two other, short-lived Marvel World War II series, Capt. Savage and his Leatherneck Raiders (later titled Captain Savage and his Battlefield Raiders), which lasted 19 issues from 1968–1970; and Combat Kelly and the Deadly Dozen, which lasted nine issues from 1972-1973. The Howlers guest starred in #6 and #11 of the former series, and #4 of the latter.

Lee explained the series's transition to reprints: "... so much fan mail came in from readers who wanted more of Sgt. Fury, but we didn't have time, I didn't have the men to draw it, I didn't have the time to write it, and we were busy with other things, so we just started re-printing the books, and strangely enough, the reprint versions of Sgt. Fury sold as well as the original ones had!" The final issue, #167 (Dec. 1981) reprinted the first issue.

Seven annual publications appeared, the first titled Sgt. Fury and his Howling Commandos Special King Size Annual #1 (1965), and the remainder titled Sgt. Fury and his Howling Commandos King-Size Special #2-7 (1966 - Nov. 1971), with hyphen and sans "Annual". The final three contain reprints only, save for a 10-page framing sequence in #6. In annuals #1 and #3, the Howlers reunited for a special mission each in the Korean War and the Vietnam War, respectively; annual #2 found them storming the beaches at Normandy on D-Day in 1944, and annual #4 was a flashback to the Battle of the Bulge.

One latter-day story was published in Sgt. Fury and his Howling Commandos #1 (July 2009), as the cover logo read; its copyright indicia read Sgt. Fury & His Howling Commandos One-Shot #1. The 32-page story, "Shotgun Opera", was by writer Jesse Alexander and artist John Paul Leon.

== Characters ==
In addition to Fury, the elite special unit of U.S. Army Rangers nicknamed the Howling Commandos consisted of the following:

- Corporal Timothy Aloysius Cadwallader "Dum Dum" Dugan - A former circus strongman, Dum Dum is Fury's good right hand. He occasionally refers to his wife in Boston and his mother-in-law as reasons that he enlisted, preferring fighting Nazis to dealing with them.
- Private Isadore "Izzy" Cohen - One of the first demonstrably Jewish American comic book heroes. Izzy is a master mechanic.
- Private Gabriel "Gabe" Jones - An African American serving in an integrated unit. (The regular U.S. armed forces were not in reality integrated until after the war in 1948. However, certain elite units were in other comic books.)
- Private Dino Manelli - He is modeled after Dean Martin. A swashbuckling movie actor, born in Italy, Dino enlisted to give back to the country that gave him so much. He is fluent in Italian and, inexplicably, also in German.
- Private Robert "Rebel" Ralston - An ex-jockey from Kentucky's Bluegrass region.
- Private Percival "Pinky" Pinkerton - Loosely modeled after real-life Commando and movie actor David Niven, this British soldier replaced Juniper in issue #8 (July 1964).
- Private Jonathan "Junior" Juniper — In an unusual and daring move for comics at the time, Junior was killed in action after a few issues (issue #4 (Nov. 1963)). As one comics historian wrote in 1999, "Today that's no big deal but in 1963, comics heroes simply didn't die; not permanently, anyway. Suddenly, with the death of 'Junior' Juniper, the series acquired some real cachet. It now played like a true-life war drama where people got killed and never came back. You wondered who would be next."
- Private Eric Koenig - A defector from Nazi Germany who joined the squad in issue #27 (Feb. 1966).
- Private James "Jim" Morita - Was an American of Japanese descent who served in the U.S. Army as a Ranger during World War II. He joined a Nisei Squadron under the command of Capt. "Happy Sam" Sawyer and served with the Howling Commandos on several missions.
- Private Jacques "Frenchie" Dernier - Was a member of the French Resistance against the Nazi occupation during WWII.

== Fictional team history ==
In issue #34 (Sept. 1966) it is shown that a young Nick Fury with his friend Red Hargrove, left their childhood neighborhood to pursue their dreams of adventure, eventually settling on a daring wing-walking aviation act. Their death-defying stunts caught the attention of Lieutenant Samuel "Happy Sam" Sawyer when Fury and Hargrove were training British Commandos in low-level parachuting. Sawyer was serving with the British Commandos in 1940 and underwent training by Fury. Sawyer enlisted them for a special mission in the Netherlands. Nick and Red later joined the U.S. Army, with Fury undergoing basic training under a Sergeant Bass at Fort Dix in New Jersey. Both Fury and Red were stationed at Schofield Barracks, Oahu, Hawaii when the Imperial Japanese Navy attacked the base on December 7, 1941, and Red was among the many killed in the attack on Pearl Harbor.

Sawyer recruited select U.S. Army Rangers to his "Able" Company. Sawyer assigned Fury the command of the First Attack Squad, nicknamed the "Howling Commandos". They and the Second Attack Squad (the "Maulers", led by Sgt. "Bull" McGiveney, with Cpl. "Ricketts" Johnson), and, later, Jim Morita's Nisei squad were stationed in a military base in England to fight specialized missions, primarily, but not exclusively, in the European theatre of World War II, eventually going as far afield as the Pacific theatre, Africa, and, once each, in the Middle East and on the Russian front. Fury fell in love with a beautiful English nurse, Pamela Hawley, who is killed in a German bombing raid on London before he could propose to her.

The Howling Commandos' earliest (but not first-published) assignment occurred in the autumn of 1942. They were to recover British rocket scientist Dr. Henry MacMillan from a German military base in occupied Norway. Their success brought them to the attention of British Prime Minister Winston Churchill, who incorporated the unit into the British Army, and given the title of "Commandos".

The Howlers fought against the likes of German General Erwin Rommel and inter-squad bigotry, often in the same story. Antagonists included Baron Strucker, Captain America's nemeses Baron Zemo and the Red Skull (Adolf Hitler's protégé), and other Axis villains. The Howlers encountered Office of Strategic Services agent Reed Richards (later Mister Fantastic of the Fantastic Four) in issue #3 (Sept. 1963), and fought alongside Captain America and Bucky in #13 (Dec. 1964).

They reunited for missions in the Korean War, where Fury received a field promotion to lieutenant, and in the Vietnam War, each in a summer-annual special, as well as at a present-day, fictional reunion gala in issue #100 (July 1972).

== In other media ==
=== Television ===
- The Howling Commandos make a cameo appearance in the X-Men: The Animated Series episode "Old Soldiers".
- The Howling Commandos appear in The Super Hero Squad Show episode "Wrath of the Red Skull!", consisting of Nick Fury, Dum Dum Dugan, Gabe Jones, and Izzy Cohen.
- The Howling Commandos appear in The Avengers: Earth's Mightiest Heroes, led by series original character and Nick Fury's father Jack Fury and consisting of Dum Dum Dugan, Gabe Jones, Rebel Ralston, Izzy Cohen, Dino Manelli, Pinky Pinkerton, and James Howlett.

=== Marvel Cinematic Universe ===
The Howling Commandos appear in media set in the Marvel Cinematic Universe, consisting of Bucky Barnes (Sebastian Stan), Dum Dum Dugan (Neal McDonough), Gabe Jones (Derek Luke), Montgomery Falsworth (JJ Feild), Jim Morita (Kenneth Choi), Jacques Dernier (Bruno Ricci), Happy Sam Sawyer (Leonard Roberts), Junior Juniper (James Austin Kerr), and Pinky Pinkerton (Richard Short).

== Collected editions ==
- Marvel Masterworks: Sgt. Fury Vol. 1 (Sgt. Fury and his Howling Commandos #1-13) ISBN 978-0785120391
- Marvel Masterworks: Sgt. Fury Vol. 2 (Sgt. Fury and his Howling Commandos #14-23, Annual #1) ISBN 978-0785129288
- Marvel Masterworks: Sgt. Fury Vol. 3 (Sgt. Fury and his Howling Commandos #24-32, Annual #2) ISBN 978-0785142126
- Marvel Masterworks: Sgt. Fury Vol. 4 (Sgt. Fury and his Howling Commandos #33-43) ISBN 978-0785159599
- Essential Sgt. Fury Vol. 1 (Sgt. Fury and his Howling Commandos #1-23, Annual #1) ISBN 978-0785163954
- Marvel Epic Collection Vol. 1 (Sgt. Fury and His Howling Commandos #1-19) ISBN 978-1302916572
- Marvel Epic Collection Vol. 2 (Sgt. Fury and His Howling Commandos #20-36, Annual #1-2) ISBN 978-1302952549
