= Time and Tide (Agent Carter) =

- Agent Carter episode
- Episode no.: Season 1 Episode 3
- Directed by: Scott Winant
- Written by: Andi Bushell
- Cinematography by: Gabriel Beristain
- Editing by: David J. Siegel
- Original air date: January 13, 2015
- Running time: 41 minutes

Guest appearances
- Lyndsy Fonseca as Angie Martinelli; Kyle Bornheimer as Ray Krzeminski; Bridget Regan as Dottie Underwood; Meagen Fay as Miriam Fry; Lesley Boone as Rose

Episode chronology
← Previous "Bridge and Tunnel"	Next → "The Blitzkrieg Button"
- Agent Carter season 1

"Time and Tide" is the third episode of the first season of the American television series Agent Carter, inspired by the films Captain America: The First Avenger and Captain America: The Winter Soldier, and the Marvel One-Shot short film also titled Agent Carter. It features the Marvel Comics character Peggy Carter as she learns dark secrets about her ally Edwin Jarvis while secretly searching for dangerous, stolen weapons, and is set in the Marvel Cinematic Universe (MCU), sharing continuity with the films of the franchise. The episode was written by Andi Bushell and directed by Scott Winant.

Hayley Atwell reprises her role as Carter from the film series, and is joined by regular cast members James D'Arcy (Jarvis), Chad Michael Murray, Enver Gjokaj, and Shea Whigham.

"Time and Tide" originally aired on ABC on January 13, 2015, and according to Nielsen Media Research, was watched by 5.10 million viewers.

== Plot ==
Strategic Scientific Reserve (SSR) agent Peggy Carter is acclimatizing to life in the Griffith Hotel, a strict women's-only hostel where men are not allowed above the lobby, while pretending to work at the telephone company, and secretly attempting to clear supposed traitor Howard Stark's name at night without the knowledge of her friends or colleagues. SSR chief Roger Dooley and Agent Ray Krzeminski investigate a hotel room after having found a key while searching for Stark. They discover a typewriter with a long-range transmitter, while Agent Jack Thompson discovers that the deceased Leet Brannis, who they had also found while searching for Stark, had apparently been killed two years earlier during World War II. Agent Daniel Sousa is investigating a license plate discovered in the remains of a Roxxon Oil refinery previously, and learns that it is registered to Stark.

Thompson and Sousa visit Stark's butler Edwin Jarvis, who has been secretly assisting Carter at the request of the now in-hiding Stark, and take him in for questioning regarding the finding of the license plate at a major crime scene. Thompson brings up that Jarvis, when serving in the British military before World War II, had been dishonorably discharged for treason, only escaping the death penalty by the influence of Stark's fortune. Thompson threatens to have Jarvis and his wife, Ana, deported, but before this threat can be used to get any answers out of Jarvis, Carter intervenes, faking incompetence in a calculated move that allows Jarvis to walk free, in turn losing any respect that she may have earned from her male coworkers.

Carter and Jarvis then return to Stark's house, and search his vault, which had contained dangerous weapons that had been stolen by Brannis (Stark is deemed a traitor due to the fact that he could easily have sold the weapons on the black market himself). While following the sewer system below Stark's house, Carter broaches the subject of Jarvis's past with him, as she needs to be able to trust him if they are to work together. Jarvis explains that he had met Anna, who is Jewish, in Budapest whilst serving, and as War was breaking out, Jarvis's superior refused to save her from persecution. Jarvis forged the general's signature in an attempt to save her himself, but was caught, and the two only escaped to live happy lives in America with the help of Stark. At the end of the sewer pipe, the two find a ship in which Brannis had stored all of Stark's inventions. Jarvis anonymously tips off the SSR to their location, while Carter fights off an associate of Brannis' who was guarding the weapons. Using one of the weapons, Carter is able to subdue the man, but they are forced to leave him, a witness, there when the SSR promptly arrives.

Dooley orders the weapons and the man all transported back to the SSR immediately, with Krzeminski taking the man. As they are driving, the man is about to break Carter's cover to Krzeminski, when they are attacked by an unknown assailant, who kills them both. The entire SSR office mourns Krzeminski's death, even Carter, who he had never treated well at all. Dooley explains that even though Stark may have not pulled the trigger, this was all his fault, and Krzeminski would still be alive if it wasn't for his actions.

== Production ==
=== Development ===
At the 2014 San Diego Comic-Con, Marvel announced that Anthony and Joe Russo, who directed Captain America: The Winter Soldier, would direct the episode. However, it was ultimately directed by Scott Winant. "Time and Tide" was written by Andi Bushell.

=== Casting ===
In December 2014, Marvel revealed that main cast members Hayley Atwell, James D'Arcy, Chad Michael Murray, Enver Gjokaj, and Shea Whigham would star as Peggy Carter, Edwin Jarvis, Jack Thompson, Daniel Sousa, and Roger Dooley, respectively. It was also revealed that the guest cast for the episode would include Lyndsy Fonseca as Angie Martinelli, Kyle Bornheimer as Agent Ray Krzeminski, Meagen Fay as Miriam Fry, Patrick Smith as Agent Wallace, Alexander Carroll as Agent Yauch, Rob Mars as Jerome Zandow, Lesley Boone as Rose, Benita Robledo as Carol, Bridget Regan as Dottie Underwood, Laura Coover as Molly, Tim James as Jimmy, Paul Roache as building manager, Christie Lynn Herring as prostitute and Rick Steadman as automat customer. However, Smith, Carroll, Mars, Robledo, Coover, James, Roache, Herring, and Steadman did not receive guest star credit in the episode. Fonseca, Bornheimer, Fay, Carroll, and Boone all reprise their roles from earlier in the series.

=== Design ===
In the Griffith Hotel (based on the Barbizon Hotel for Women) where Carter now lives, the women have high expectations, including having to wear appropriate attire – series costume designer Giovanna Ottobre-Melton noted that "No one shows up in P.J.s or curlers in the dining room". When Carter and Jarvis investigate in a sewer, she wears a "fashionable yet very practical jumpsuit" consisting of "her brown wool plaid high-waisted check pants, previously seen in the premiere ... with a matching plaid shirt, belt, and brown brogue style boots", while he wears "fisher stripe belted coveralls" over his suit. Both of these outfits were custom made for the series. For the introduction of Dottie Underwood, "fresh from Iowa", Regan wears "a vintage burgundy hand-knit sweater, sage green blouse, dark green A-line skirt, and green suede pumps."

== Release ==
"Time and Tide" was first aired on ABC in the United States and CTV in Canada on January 13, 2015.

The episode was released on Blu-ray and DVD along with the rest of the first season on September 18, 2015, as an Amazon exclusive in the U.S. "Time and Tide" debuted on Hulu on November 29, 2017, after it acquired the exclusive streaming rights to the series, and was made available on Disney+ at launch, on November 12, 2019, along with the rest of the series.

== Reception ==
=== Ratings ===
In the United States the episode received a 1.5/4 percent share among adults between the ages of 18 and 49, meaning that it was seen by 1.5 percent of all households, and 4 percent of all of those watching television at the time of the broadcast. It was watched by 5.10 million viewers. The Canadian broadcast gained 1.80 million viewers, the third highest for that day and the eleventh highest for the week.
