= Pinky Pinkerton =

Fictional character

- Pinky Pinkerton as depicted in Black Panther/Captain America: Flags of Our Fathers #1 (April 2010). Art by Denys Cowan (penciler), Klaus Janson (inker), and Pete Pantazis (colorist).

Publication information
- Publisher: Marvel Comics
- First appearance: Sgt. Fury and his Howling Commandos #8 (July 1964)
- Created by: Stan Lee (writer); Jack Kirby (artist)

In-story information
- Alter ego: Percival Pinkerton
- Team affiliations: Howling Commandos; S.H.I.E.L.D.

Percival "Pinky" Pinkerton is a fictional character appearing in American comic books published by Marvel Comics. The character's first appearance was in Sgt. Fury and his Howling Commandos #8 (July 1964), in which he replaced Jonathan Junior Juniper who was killed in issue #4. He was created by writer Stan Lee and artist Jack Kirby.

Pinky Pinkerton was portrayed by Richard Short, in the TV series Agent Carter which is set in the Marvel Cinematic Universe.

== Fictional character biography ==
Percival "Pinky" Pinkerton was an English member of the original Howling Commandos who fought alongside the team during World War II. A British Army commando and gentleman ranker who used an umbrella as a weapon along with his Thompson submachine gun, Pinkerton had served alongside the unit commander Captain Samuel Happy Sam Sawyer prior to Pearl Harbor when both were with the British Commandos.

Along with Colonel Timothy Dum Dum Dugan and Dino Manelli, he helped organize the Deadly Dozen.

Though never explained in the series, Pinkerton wore a Carlist Requetés type red beret with a yellow tassel with his battledress that may have involved service in the Spanish Civil War. Pinkerton also wore his battle dress with an open collar with scarf rather than having the buttoned collar of a British other rank.

In issue #23 ("The Man Who Failed") of Sgt. Fury and his Howling Commandos, Percy's older brother, Lieutenant Colonel Pinkerton appeared. The story, set in Burma revealed that Pinkerton came from an English family with a long tradition of service as officers to the Crown. Why Pinkerton never accepted a commission was explained as his living a playboy womanizing lifestyle during his initial military training that led him to be unable to catch up with his studies and resigning.

In the first Sgt Fury Annual taking place with the Howlers (Howling Commandos) being recalled to service in the Korean War, Pinkerton was a sergeant as were all the other former private soldiers of the unit. At the time of their 1966 Vietnam War mission (Sgt Fury and his Howling Commandos Annual #3) Pinkerton was managing a Playboy Club in London.

Pinkerton, Izzy Cohen and Dino Manelli had a reunion with Fury aboard the S.H.I.E.L.D. Helicarrier.

As with several other members of the Howling Commandos, Pinkerton joined S.H.I.E.L.D. He later dies from cancer, with Dum Dum Dugan at his side.

== Pinkerton and the Essex Regiment ==
Pinkerton wore Essex Regiment shoulder flashes on his battledress. The battalion that Lt. Colonel Pinkerton led was referred to as the "Burma Dragons". During the Burma Campaign the Essex Regiment were part of the Chindits. A famous member of the regiment was Arthur Percival, who was commissioned into the regiment in 1916 and achieved fame as a Regimental Intelligence Officer. He later commanded the Imperial Garrison at Singapore, surrendering his command to the Japanese in 1942.

== Ancestry ==
Three ancestors of Percy were mentioned in Sgt. Fury and his Howling Commandos. These include:

- A Pinkerton who survived the winter at Valley Forge in 1777–1778
- Pinkerton who fought in the battle of Waterloo in 1815.
- An ancestor who fought during World War I.

== Character basis ==
In a 2002 interview with the Traditional Values Coalition's executive director Andrea Sheldon Lafferty about the latest incarnation of the comic book character of the Rawhide Kid, who was now homosexual, Stan Lee said, "years ago [a comic book] that I did, Sgt Fury, ...had a gay character. One member of the platoon was called, I think, Percy Pinkerton. He was gay. We didn't make a big issue of it. In this comic book that I read, the word gay wasn't even used. He's just a colorful character who follows his own different drummer. He follows a different beat. But we're not proselytizing for gayness". In a 2005 interview, however, Lee stated that Pinkerton came off as being gay, but that "it wasn't purposely done that way".

In Sgt Fury #23 Pinkerton was portrayed as a playboy. Artist Dick Ayers said in an interview that Lee told him to base Pinkerton on actor David Niven.

== In other media ==
- Pinky Pinkerton makes a non-speaking appearance in The Avengers: Earth's Mightiest Heroes episode "Meet Captain America" as a member of the Howling Commandos.
- Pinky Pinkerton appears in the Agent Carter episode "The Iron Ceiling", portrayed by Richard Short.
