= Roger Dooley =

Fictional character in Marvel Comics

Publication information
- Publisher: Marvel Comics
- First appearance: Marvel Graphic Novel #18 (1985)
- Created by: John Byrne

In-story information
- Team affiliations: S.H.I.E.L.D.

Roger Dooley is a fictional character appearing in American comic books published by Marvel Comics.

Shea Whigham appeared as Roger Dooley in the Marvel Cinematic Universe TV series Agent Carter in the first season. He was depicted as the chief of the Strategic Scientific Reserve (SSR) who oversaw agents Peggy Carter, Jack Thompson, and Daniel Sousa.

== Publication history ==
Roger Dooley first appeared in Marvel Graphic Novel #18 and was created by John Byrne.

== Fictional character biography ==
Roger Dooley was a Level Four Special Officer for S.H.I.E.L.D.

Dooley was placed in charge of an operation to evaluate She-Hulk. During the operation, he accidentally teleported a colony of sentient cockroaches which later took over his body. When the cockroaches tried to have him take over She-Hulk, she threw him and his body ruptured.

== Powers and abilities ==
Roger Dooley was a trained S.H.I.E.L.D. agent.

== In other media ==
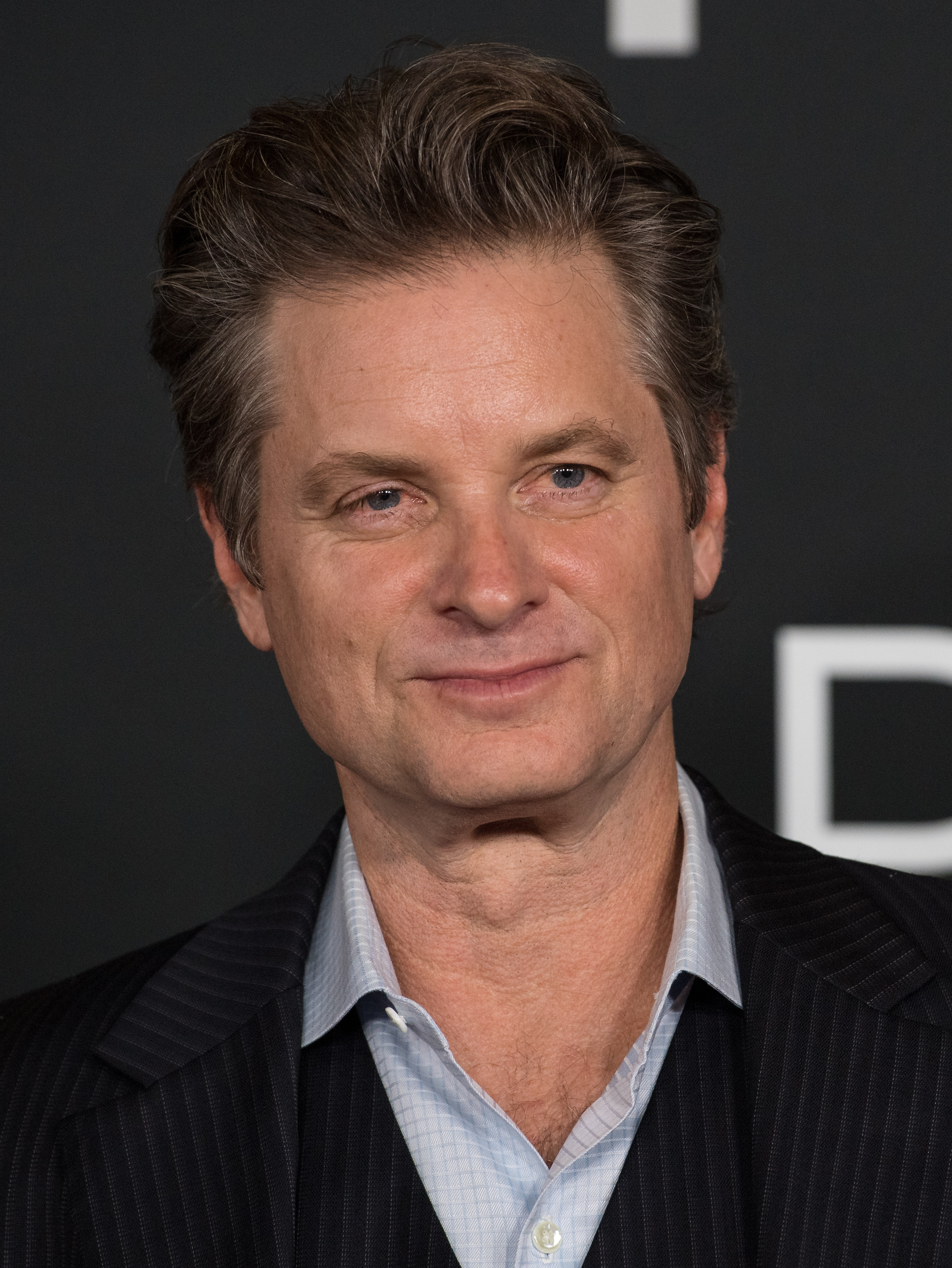
Shea Whigham in 2018

Roger Dooley appears in Agent Carter, portrayed by Shea Whigham. This version is the chief of the Strategic Scientific Reserve (SSR). Because of Dooley's limited appearances and characterization in the comics, Whigham created his own background for the character on which he said: "I don't think Dooley is a political appointee. I think I worked my way up through good hard work. I don't think I'm a politician in any respect. Dooley's got a pretty wicked sense of humor". In the episode "Snafu", Viktor Ivchenko kills Dooley with an explosive vest.
