= Dum Dum Dugan =

Fictional character appearing in publications from Marvel Comics

- Dum Dum Dugan taken from the cover of Secret Warriors #4 (May 2009). Art by Jim Cheung.

Publication information
- Publisher: Marvel Comics
- First appearance: Sgt. Fury and his Howling Commandos #1 (May 1963)
- Created by: Stan Lee (writer); Jack Kirby (artist)

In-story information
- Full name: Timothy Aloysius Cadwallader "Dum Dum" Dugan
- Team affiliations: S.H.I.E.L.D. Howling Commandos; U.S. Army; Rangers; British Army; Flying Commandos; Great Wheel "Avengers" (1959); Godzilla Squad; S.T.A.K.E. C.R.A.D.L.E.
- Notable aliases: Libra
- Abilities: Extensive military training, skilled marksman, expert in espionage and intelligence

Timothy Aloysius Cadwallader "Dum Dum" Dugan is a character appearing in American comic books published by Marvel Comics. He is an officer of S.H.I.E.L.D. and is one of the most experienced members of Nick Fury's team, known for his marksmanship with rifles and trademark bowler hat.

Neal McDonough appeared as the character in the Marvel Cinematic Universe.

== Publication history ==
Dum Dum Dugan first appeared in Sgt. Fury and his Howling Commandos #1 (May 1963), and was created by Stan Lee and Jack Kirby.

Dum Dum Dugan received an entry in the Official Handbook of the Marvel Universe Update '89 #2.

== Fictional character biography ==
Dum Dum Dugan was originally portrayed as a British citizen in Sgt Fury #1, but later retconned to be born in Boston, Massachusetts. During World War II, while working as a circus strongman, Dugan helps Nick Fury and Sam "Happy" Sawyer escape the Nazis during a mission. Dugan joins the British Army, and when Sawyer is charged with creating Fury's First Attack Squad, formally listed as "Able Company" and nicknamed the Howling Commandos, Sawyer invites Dugan to transfer into the US Army and be Fury's second-in-command. Dugan's exceptional strength saves the day in several of his adventures in the Sgt. Fury comic books. Dugan is an enlisted man with the rank of corporal, and wears the chevrons of his rank on the front top of his trademark bowler hat throughout World War II.

Dugan leaves the U.S. Army before the Korean War, but rejoins during the war as Second Lieutenant under the promoted First Lieutenant Fury, once again as his second-in-command of the reformed Howling Commandos. Fury had already received a battlefield promotion to Second Lt. earlier. Dugan remains with Fury when Fury continues his military career into the Vietnam War, as shown in Sgt. Fury and his Howling Commandos Annual #3-4, and later into espionage work. Dugan's exact rank is not stated, but he is addressed as "Captain" at one point. He remains with Fury when Fury goes into the CIA and later into the original S.H.I.E.L.D..

Different accounts state that Dugan and other members of the Howling Commandos receive the Infinity Formula to explain how they all remain youthful and active despite being all into their 60s and 70s in the modern era. Other stories contradict this artificial maintenance of youth by Dugan as merely dyeing his hair and suffering a heart attack.

Later on in life, he is placed in charge of internal security on the S.H.I.E.L.D. Helicarrier.

Dum Dum is placed in charge of a SHIELD unit coined the Godzilla Squad, charged with the task of tracking and stopping the radioactive kaiju. Over the course of the twenty-four issue Godzilla, King of the Monsters series, Dugan goes from loathing the creature's destructive tendencies to accepting the beast's existence after Godzilla saves him on numerous occasions. Dugan goes on to recall a long list of his greatest nightmares, one of which includes Godzilla.

After suffering a heart attack, Dugan is formally promoted to Fury's permanent second-in-command of S.H.I.E.L.D. as "Deputy Director", though he has acted as such before his formal appointment.

=== Power struggles ===
In Marvel Graphic Novel #18: She-Hulk, Dum Dum Dugan runs S.H.I.E.L.D. during one of Fury's absences. His authority is usurped by the craven, sex-obsessed agent Roger Dooley. After She-Hulk and Wyatt Wingfoot are illegally captured, Dugan protests Dooley's forcible strip search of She-Hulk in public, but is overruled. Dugan regains his authority when Dooley is killed in action.

=== Nick Fury vs. S.H.I.E.L.D. ===
During the Nick Fury vs. S.H.I.E.L.D. six issue series, Dum Dum Dugan and, later, the entirety of S.H.I.E.L.D., deal with another mutiny from within. Dugan was shown to have been shot to death while taking out the trash. In this series, Hydra was revealed to have been a sister organization of S.H.I.E.L.D., with both directly controlled by the mysterious council, who had replaced many of the organization's top brass - including Deputy Director Dugan - with Life Model Decoy android duplicates to speed the survival of the fittest selection process that the council had been forcing between the two organizations over the decades. All the officers who were thought to be killed were shown to have been replaced with Life Model Decoy android replacements and were found alive. Dugan retires, along with many of the older officers, at the end of this series. Dugan's retirement does not last long, as he rejoins Fury when the next version of S.H.I.E.L.D. (Strategic Hazard Intervention Espionage Logistics Directorate) is created.

Dugan calls on Squirrel Girl to help him take down various supervillains.

With Fury's absence at the S.H.I.E.L.D. headquarters, Dugan is placed second-in-command to Maria Hill. Dugan is put in charge of mutant affairs, and deals with Wolverine. Dugan apparently knows a dire secret to Logan's past.

=== Civil War ===
In Marvel's Civil War crossover, Dum Dum Dugan and several other S.H.I.E.L.D. agents are sent to capture Captain America to which the entire group is defeated. He expresses regret to fellow agent Sharon Carter for trying to capture Steve Rogers. He also states his concerns about losing faith in S.H.I.E.L.D due to the war and the way the organization is run under Hill as Director.

Afterwards, Dugan turns in his letter of resignation when Tony Stark takes over as director of S.H.I.E.L.D. as he does not approve of the changes made or the way the organization is run. Dugan's resignation is not accepted as he is too vital to S.H.I.E.L.D.; despite his disapproval of Stark's leadership, Stark still trusts Dugan, and Dugan alone, with the command of a weapon that could send an abandoned Manhattan into the Negative Zone, destroying the island and anyone inside during World War Hulk, stating that the Hulk and the Warbound are too dangerous a global threat to leave Manhattan free. Stark trusts that Dugan will know the appropriate time to execute the plan, if at all. Dugan never used the weapon.

Dugan later proved his worth and loyalty to S.H.I.E.L.D during a confrontation with Hill, where he forced Hill to confront the fact that Hill was apparently willing to take actions that would allow innocent people to die while still sticking to 'the book' because the alternative was to disobey orders, informing Hill that some situations were not in 'the book'. Inspired by Dugan's words, Hill ended up putting her career on the line by locking down the United Nations under S.H.I.E.L.D. martial law so Stark could escape a tribunal and track down the Mandarin, with Dugan providing a version of Iron Man's armor after the Extremis abilities were deactivated.

Dum Dum is stabbed through the chest by Daken.

=== Secret Invasion ===
Shortly after Rogers's death, it is revealed that Dugan was ambushed and stabbed by a Skrull impersonator who took his place. Dugan's impostor destroys the Peak, the orbital base of S.W.O.R.D., in a suicide strike that allows the Skrull armada to invade Earth. Afterwards, Iron Man discovers the Skrulls' kidnap victims alive and well, including Dum Dum and Valentina Allegra de Fontaine. Dugan is later shown in a support group meeting with the others that had been replaced by Skrulls; Dugan wanted to leave immediately but is convinced to stay.

=== Secret Warriors ===
After a confrontation that goes badly between the Secret Warriors and the Gorgon, Fury calls up Dum Dum Dugan's "Howling Commandos" PMC for help in the missions, needing "a couple of nasty old bastards with a bad habit of shooting first and asking questions later." Dugan learns that the new S.H.I.E.L.D. organization has been controlled by their old enemies Hydra right from the start, the same as the older incarnations of S.H.I.E.L.D. Dugan later shows up as part of Fury's efforts to bring down Hydra and yet another secretive organization, the Russian Leviathan. Dugan and Jasper Sitwell soon became all that is left of the Howling Commandos PMC after battles with Hydra and Leviathan and are arrested by the U.N. At the end of Secret Warriors, Dugan and Sitwell were released.

Dugan is recruited as part of a multi-verse wide effort to stop a supernatural-powered Nazi zombie army. Assisted by Howard the Duck, he takes a team of warriors to the affected reality and manages to neutralize the threat at the source.

A Hydra group attempts to devastate civilization via super-powered shock-troops and media that inflames people's personal beliefs into irrationality. Dugan leads the effort in destroying this group, often with high explosives. He works closely with Carter and the Falcon. Dugan is severely wounded in the upper arm but recovers.

=== Original Sin ===
During the Original Sin storyline, it is revealed Dum Dum Dugan was killed in 1966 while on a Black Ops mission, and Fury had his body preserved and his mind transferred to an advanced Life Model Decoy before anyone else learned that Dugan was dead. Fury claims that this was because he wanted to keep his best friend alive in some form, but Dugan is angered at Fury's actions, declaring that the real reason Fury kept him alive was so that Dugan could be his "hairshirt", allowing Fury to tell himself that he was not a monster if he still felt bad about things like what had happened to Dugan. Dugan commits suicide, but Maria Hill rebuilds the LMD as he is too vital to S.H.I.E.L.D. to be lost.

== Other versions ==
=== 1602 ===
An alternate universe version of Dum Dum Dugan named Dougan appears in Marvel 1602. This version is the commander of Sir Nicholas Fury's soldiers and defender of the Roanoke Colony.

=== Earth X ===
An alternate universe version of Dum Dum Dugan appears in Earth X. This version was killed by the Hydra entity alongside the other Howling Commandos. Nonetheless, his spirit participates in Mar-Vell's battle against Mephisto's forces.

=== The Transformers ===
Dum Dum Dugan appears in The Transformers #3.

=== Ultimate Marvel ===
An alternate universe version of Dum Dum Dugan appears in the Ultimate Marvel imprint. This version is S.H.I.E.L.D.'s Director of Mutant Operations who possesses a connection to Wolverine and took Chester Phillips' place in Project: Rebirth.

== In other media ==
=== Television ===
- Dum Dum Dugan makes a non-speaking cameo appearance in the X-Men: The Animated Series episode "Old Soldiers".
- Dum Dum Dugan appears in Iron Man, voiced by W. Morgan Sheppard.
- Timothy Dugan appears in Nick Fury: Agent of S.H.I.E.L.D., portrayed by Garry Chalk.
- Dum Dum Dugan makes a non-speaking appearance in The Super Hero Squad Show episode "Wrath of the Red Skull!".
- Dum Dum Dugan appears in The Avengers: Earth's Mightiest Heroes.
- Dum Dum Dugan appears in Marvel Rising Ultimate Comics, voiced by Brian Bloom.

=== Marvel Cinematic Universe ===
Neal McDonough as Dum Dum Dugan in Captain America: The First Avenger.

Dum Dum Dugan appears in media set in the Marvel Cinematic Universe (MCU), portrayed by Neal McDonough. This version is one of several POWs who was freed and recruited by Steve Rogers to form the Howling Commandos. Dugan first appears in the film Captain America: The First Avenger before making subsequent appearances in Agent Carter (2013), the Agents of S.H.I.E.L.D. episode "Shadows", and the Agent Carter (2015) episode "The Iron Ceiling". Additionally, an alternate timeline version of Dugan appears in the What If...? episode "What If... Captain Carter Were the First Avenger?".

=== Video games ===
- Dum Dum Dugan makes a non-speaking appearance in The Punisher.
- Dum Dum Dugan appears as a non-playable character in Marvel: Ultimate Alliance, voiced by Scott MacDonald.
- Dum Dum Dugan makes a non-speaking appearance in The Punisher: No Mercy.
- Dum Dum Dugan appears in Captain America: Super Soldier, voiced by Neal McDonough.
- Dum Dum Dugan appears in Marvel Heroes, voiced by Michael Benyaer.
- Dum Dum Dugan appeared as a playable character in Lego Marvel's Avengers.
- Dum Dum Dugan appears in Marvel Avengers Academy, voiced by Billy Kametz.
- Dum Dum Dugan appears in Marvel's Avengers.

== See also ==
- List of S.H.I.E.L.D. members
