= Eric Koenig =

Fictional character created by Marvel Comics

Publication information
- Publisher: Marvel Comics
- First appearance: Sgt. Fury and his Howling Commandos #27 (February 1966)
- Created by: Stan Lee (writer); Dick Ayers (artist)

In-story information
- Alter ego: Eric Koenig
- Species: Human
- Team affiliations: S.H.I.E.L.D. Howling Commandos
- Abilities: Skilled pilot

Eric Koenig is a fictional character appearing in American comic books published by Marvel Comics. He first appeared in Sgt. Fury and his Howling Commandos #27 (February 1966) and he was created by writer Stan Lee and artist Dick Ayers. He is most commonly in association with the Howling Commandos and S.H.I.E.L.D.

Patton Oswalt portrayed the character in the first season of the TV series Agents of S.H.I.E.L.D.. After Koenig is killed, Oswalt continued to portray his identical brothers Billy, Sam, and Thurston and grandfather Ernest throughout the remaining seasons.

== Publication history ==
Eric Koenig's first appearance was in Sgt. Fury and the Howling Commandos vol. 1 #27 (February 1966), and he was created by writer Stan Lee and artist Dick Ayers.

Eric Koenig received an entry in the All-New Official Handbook of the Marvel Universe A to Z: Update #3 (2007).

== Fictional character biography ==
As a teenager, Eric Koenig and his best friend Wilhelm Hauser were members of the Hitler Youth Group. When Germany invaded Poland in 1939, Koenig and Hauser joined the Wehrmacht, or Nazi German Army. Eventually, Hauser was transferred to the S.S., while Koenig joined the Luftwaffe. However, before he can complete his trainingas a pilot, he is requested as an aid to the verbally abusive Nazi scientist August Draus.

When the Howling Commandos were sent to destroy a new weapon invented by Dr. Draus, Nick Fury managed to convince Koenig to defect to the Allied cause. Some time later, Koenig aids Fury in rescuing the rest of the Howlers, who had been captured on an earlier mission. As a result of his bravery, Koenig is accepted as a temporary member of the Howling Commandos (replacing Dino Manelli, who was injured during the escape). On his first mission as a Howler, Koenig comes face to face with his childhood friend Wilhelm Hauser, causing conflicting feelings for the ex-Nazi. As a result, he cannot bring himself to kill Hauser (though the latter does not hesitate to shoot him). Despite feeling as if he failed, Fury congratulates him for having compassion for his former friend (in contrast to the inhumane Nazis).

In issue #65, "Eric Koenig, Traitor!", Koenig seemed to have been exposed as a Gestapo plant, and his apparent treachery was part of the storyline from then on. This later turned out to have been a complicated double agent operation by the High Command, and in issue #79, Koenig was finally confirmed to be a loyal fighter for the Allies.

After the war, Koenig is among the members of the Howling Commandos who join Nick Fury in forming S.H.I.E.L.D. A Life Model Decoy of Koenig participates in the Deltite affair, but destroys itself after being captured and scanned by Tony Stark.

When S.H.I.E.L.D. is decommissioned and its agents transferred to the newly founded H.A.M.M.E.R. during the "Dark Reign" storyline, Koenig remains with H.A.M.M.E.R. It is later revealed that Koenig had been working for H.A.M.M.E.R. from within and assisted in a raid on several H.A.M.M.E.R. Helicarriers. Koenig is later killed in a battle against Hydra.

== In other media ==
Eric Koenig appears in Agents of S.H.I.E.L.D., portrayed by Patton Oswalt. Introduced in the episode "Providence", Koenig is assigned to Nick Fury's secret S.H.I.E.L.D. base, Providence, and assists Phil Coulson and his team following S.H.I.E.L.D.'s downfall (Note: As depicted in the film Captain America: The Winter Soldier.) until he is murdered off-screen by Hydra double agent Grant Ward. Oswalt returned in the season one finale "Beginning of the End" as Eric's twin brother Billy Koenig, who oversees a S.H.I.E.L.D. base called the "Playground". In addition to appearing as Billy in the second season, Oswalt also portrays Eric and Billy's other brother Sam Koenig in the episode "...Ye Who Enter Here". In the season four episode "Hot Potato Soup", two more Koenig siblings are introduced: Thurston Koenig, a slam poet activist who mocks S.H.I.E.L.D. for allowing Eric to die, and an older sister named L.T. Koenig (portrayed by Artemis Pebdani), who got her younger siblings to join S.H.I.E.L.D. and constantly picks on them. At the end of the episode, it is revealed that the Koenig siblings were part of S.H.I.E.L.D.'s original LMD program. In the season seven premiere "The New Deal", Coulson's team travel back in time to 1931 New York City and meet the Koenig siblings' grandfather, Ernest "Hazard" Koenig, who runs a speakeasy that goes on to become an asset to S.H.I.E.L.D.'s predecessor, the Strategic Scientific Reserve, and a S.H.I.E.L.D. safehouse under the pseudonym Gemini. Following an encounter with the agents, Ernest discovers his employee, Wilfred "Freddy" Malick, is the father of future Hydra leader Gideon Malick. In the episode "Know Your Onions", Ernest is given a glimpse of the future when he meets the agents' Chronicom ally Enoch and is brought aboard the agents' airship, Zephyr One, to help save Freddy from rebel Chronicoms. After the S.H.I.E.L.D. agents leave 1931 to pursue the Chronicoms, Ernest hires a stranded Enoch to become his new bartender in exchange for information on how he, his speakeasy, and his descendants will help S.H.I.E.L.D. in the future.
