= Happy Sam Sawyer =

Publication information
- Publisher: Marvel Comics
- First appearance: Sgt. Fury and the Howling Commandos #1 (May 1963)
- Created by: Stan Lee (writer); Jack Kirby (artist)

In-story information
- Alter ego: Samuel Sawyer
- Team affiliations: Howling Commandos; United States Army

Samuel Sawyer is a character appearing in American comic books published by Marvel Comics. Created by writer Stan Lee and artist Jack Kirby, the character first appeared in Sgt. Fury and his Howling Commandos #1 (May 1963). Sawyer, also known as "Happy Sam," served as the commanding officer of the Howling Commandos. He has since been portrayed as holding various senior military positions at various points in his history.

== Publication history ==
Samuel Sawyer debuted in Sgt. Fury and his Howling Commandos #1 (May 1963), created by Stan Lee and Jack Kirby. He subsequently appeared in several Marvel series, including Captain Savage and his Battlefield Raiders (1968), and Combat Kelly and the Deadly Dozen (1972).

Sawyer is named after Stan Sawyer, a friend of Stan Lee and his wife Joan who worked as a voice-over artist in commercials.

== Fictional character biography ==
Sam Sawyer was assigned to the British Commandos by the U.S. Army. He trained for parachuting in Britain in 1940 with Finley's Flying Circus, alongside daredevil parachutist Nick Fury and pilot Red Hargroves. They gave him the nickname "Happy Sam" because of his serious and consistently stony demeanor. In 1942, Sawyer, who had been wounded in North Africa and was deemed unfit for combat missions, organized and led the Howling Commandos, Bull McGiveney's Maulers, Jim Morita's Nisei Squad, and Sgt. Bob Jenkin's The Missouri Marauders, as well as the Deadly Dozen.

In a Sgt Fury annual set in the Korean War, Sawyer was a Colonel, and in another annual set in the Vietnam War, Sawyer was a full general.

In modern times, Baron Strucker creates a Life Model Decoy (LMD) based on Sawyer who attacks the original Howling Commandos as well as Captain America. Sawyer sacrifices himself to stop the LMD after it self-destructs while trying to gain missile navigation override codes.

== In other media ==
- Sam Sawyer appears in the X-Men: The Animated Series episode "Old Soldiers," voiced by Lorne Kennedy.
- Sam Sawyer appears in the Agent Carter episode "The Iron Ceiling", portrayed by Leonard Roberts. This version is African-American.
