= Peggy Carter (disambiguation) =

Peggy Carter may refer to:

- Peggy Carter, the Marvel Comics character
- Peggy Carter (Marvel Cinematic Universe), the Marvel Cinematic Universe version
- Captain Carter, an animated alternative Marvel Cinematic Universe version
- "Peggy Carter" (Marvel Studios: Legends), an episode of Marvel Studios: Legends
