= A Trout in the Milk =

- Agents of S.H.I.E.L.D. episode
- The title card for the episode, as seen during a 1970s-style opening sequence
- Episode no.: Season 7 Episode 5
- Directed by: Stan Brooks
- Written by: Iden Baghdadchi
- Cinematography by: Allan Westbrook
- Editing by: Dexter Adriano
- Original air date: June 24, 2020
- Running time: 41 minutes

Guest appearances
- Joel Stoffer as Enoch; Tobias Jelinek as Luke; Thomas E. Sullivan as Nathaniel Malick; Neal Bledsoe as Wilfred Malick; Dawan Owens as Ford; Cameron Palatas as Gideon Malick; Sedale Threatt Jr. as John Mackenzie; Paulina Bugembe as Lilla Mackenzie; Patrick Warburton as Rick Stoner; Enver Gjokaj as Daniel Sousa

Episode chronology
← Previous "Out of the Past"	Next → "Adapt or Die"
- Agents of S.H.I.E.L.D. season 7

"A Trout in the Milk" is the fifth episode of the seventh season of the American television series Agents of S.H.I.E.L.D. Based on the Marvel Comics organization S.H.I.E.L.D., it follows a Life Model Decoy (LMD) of Phil Coulson and his team of S.H.I.E.L.D. agents as they race to stop the Chronicoms from unraveling history in the 1970s. It is set in the Marvel Cinematic Universe (MCU) and acknowledges the franchise's films. The episode was written by Iden Baghdadchi and directed by Stan Brooks.

Clark Gregg reprises his role as Coulson from the film series, starring alongside Ming-Na Wen, Chloe Bennet, Elizabeth Henstridge, Henry Simmons, Natalia Cordova-Buckley, and Jeff Ward. The episode moves to the mid-1970s, bringing with it guest star Enver Gjokaj who reprised his role of Daniel Sousa from the MCU series Agent Carter in the previous two episodes. Neal Bledsoe also returns as Wilfred Malick, while Patrick Warburton reprises his role as Rick Stoner from season five. Following changes made to the timeline, the episode depicts events from the MCU film Captain America: The Winter Soldier (2014) taking place in the 1970s.

"A Trout in the Milk" originally aired on ABC on June 24, 2020, and was watched by 1.37 million viewers. It received positive reviews for its use of events from The Winter Soldier and other Marvel references.

== Plot ==
Landing in 1973, the agents return to the speakeasy to figure out the Chronicoms' latest plan while Daniel Sousa adjusts to the new time period, only to discover from General Rick Stoner that Wilfred Malick, who should have died in 1970, is leading S.H.I.E.L.D. in preparing Project Insight, which should not have been developed for several more decades. Wilfred and the Chronicoms attempt to capture the agents, but Daisy Johnson takes the former's son, Nathaniel (who also was supposed to be dead), hostage to facilitate their escape. Unbeknownst to her, Nathaniel sees her using her powers. The agents reunite with Enoch and return to their mobile headquarters, Zephyr One, to stop Project Insight, believing they have time to do so.

Without warning however, the Chronicoms jump forward to 1976, when Project Insight is set to launch, causing Zephyr One to follow them. The aliens also confront Wilfred regarding his saving Nathaniel over destroying S.H.I.E.L.D., though they become inspired to use their enemies' emotions against them. With no other options left, Johnson and Sousa hack the Lighthouse's security system while Phil Coulson and Melinda May infiltrate the S.H.I.E.L.D. base to plant explosives. Concurrently, Deke Shaw and Elena "Yo-Yo" Rodriguez confront Wilfred, who reveals the Chronicoms knew they were going to try and destroy the Lighthouse before Shaw kills him. Despite this, he and Yo-Yo discover too late that the Chronicoms have captured Director Alphonso "Mack" Mackenzie's parents and imprisoned them in the Lighthouse. In response, Mack aborts the detonation, allowing Insight to launch. The team uses Zephyr One to destroy Insight, giving away their location as Chronicom leader Sibyl predicted while Coulson and May are arrested. Meanwhile, after capturing Johnson and Sousa, Nathaniel attempts to acquire Hydra scientist Daniel Whitehall's research on transplanting superhuman powers to others.

== Production ==
=== Development ===
After the sixth season finale of Agents of S.H.I.E.L.D. aired in August 2019, showrunners Jed Whedon, Maurissa Tancharoen, and Jeffrey Bell revealed that the seventh season would feature the team trying to save the world from invasion by the Chronicoms. They used time travel to do this, allowing the season to explore the history of S.H.I.E.L.D. Later that month, one of the season's episodes was revealed to be titled "A Trout in the Milk" and written by Iden Baghdadchi. It was confirmed to be the fifth episode of the season in June 2020, when Stan Brooks was revealed to have directed it. While creating the episode, the writers researched the opening credit sequences of 1970s crime series, ultimately finding the opening of The Streets of San Francisco. The episode they found was named "A Trout in the Milk", which led to this episode being named similarly. To prepare for the episode, Brooks watched the film Saturday Night Fever (1977) and "a lot of 70s TV" including Mannix, The Streets of San Francisco, Columbo, and Cannon.

=== Writing ===
Enver Gjokaj said it was fun to portray Daniel Sousa in the 1970s and reacting to the new time period. He added that having Sousa be out of his time would give "some clarity" to his Marvel Cinematic Universe (MCU) history and the status of his relationship with Peggy Carter. The episode also shows Sousa "struggling to be a part of the team, or S.H.I.E.L.D., and go from being at the top of the S.H.I.E.L.D. organization in his time to not really having a clue what's going on in this time." Some of the decisions Sousa makes are in service of his original mission to take down Hydra, and "feeling allegiance" to his own time.

=== Casting ===
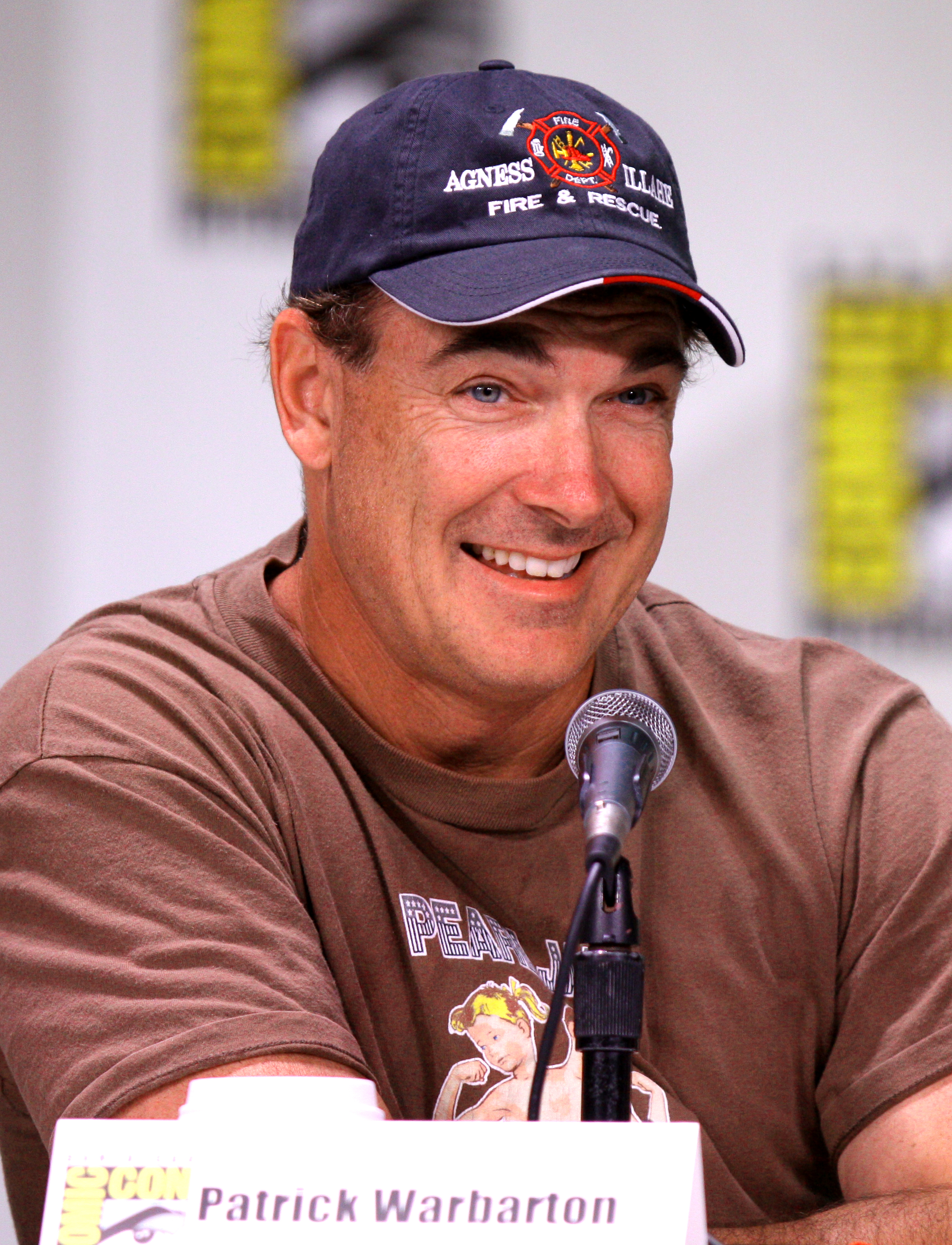
Patrick Warburton returns to guest star as Rick Stoner in the episode

With the season renewal, main cast members Ming-Na Wen, Chloe Bennet, Elizabeth Henstridge, Henry Simmons, Natalia Cordova-Buckley, and Jeff Ward were confirmed to be returning from previous seasons as Melinda May, Daisy Johnson / Quake, Jemma Simmons, Alphonso "Mack" Mackenzie, Elena "Yo-Yo" Rodriguez, and Deke Shaw, respectively. Series star Clark Gregg also returns as his character Phil Coulson, portraying a Life Model Decoy version of the character in the seventh season.

In August 2019, Patrick Warburton was revealed to be returning for the final season after appearing as Rick Stoner earlier in the series, guest starring in "A Trout in the Milk". Also guest starring are Joel Stoffer as Enoch, Tobias Jelinek as Luke, Neal Bledsoe as Wilfred Malick, and Enver Gjokaj reprising his Agent Carter role as agent Daniel Sousa, all returning from earlier episodes of the season. Cameron Palatas reprises his role as a young Gideon Malick from the third season, while Thomas E. Sullivan takes on the role of Nathaniel Malick who was portrayed by Joel Dabney Courtney in the third season. They are joined by Dawan Owens as agent Ford, Sedale Threatt Jr. as John Mackenzie, and Paulina Bugembe as Lilla Mackenzie.

=== Design ===
==== Costumes ====
Jessica Torok joined the series as costume designer alongside Whitney Galitz beginning with this episode, ahead of Galitz leaving the series to give birth to her daughter. The 1970s blue S.H.I.E.L.D. jumpsuits are a reference to the uniforms worn by S.H.I.E.L.D. agents in Marvel Comics from the 1960s and 1970s. Though the comics versions had "a darker shade of blue" and were "more skintight", the episode versions had a S.H.I.E.L.D. logo patch on the left shoulder, white bands on the right arm, and a white belt and gun holster, similarly to the comics counterpart. Torok's designs for the jumpsuits also took inspiration from real life 1970s jumpsuits. Brooks specifically requested the red Adidas tracksuit for Shaw "because there's nothing more iconic to 70s".

==== Title sequence ====
External videos
- Marvel's Agents of S.H.I.E.L.D. | 70s Opening Credits presents the full opening credits sequence of the episode, YouTube video from Marvel Entertainment's channel

"A Trout in the Milk" features a 1970s-themed opening, continuing the decade-themed opening for each episode in the season. This opening was the first in the series' history to include "actual opening credits". These feature voiceover introductions for the actors, over clips from past seasons, including: Coulson with his car Lola (which has not been "seen on the show in years") from "The Asset"; May from "Face My Enemy" during her fight against Agent 33; Daisy Johnson's "fierce entrance" from "Laws of Nature"; Mack with his shotgun-axe from "Ascension"; and Yo-Yo's first appearance in "Bouncing Back". Clips of Jemma Simmons and Deke Shaw smiling are also included.

Brooks was shown a few options the producers were thinking of for the opening before he started shooting, and once they settled on the version they would go with, Brooks storyboarded the sequence. It was originally planned to have all stock footage from past seasons in the opening, but there was an issue with the Screen Actors Guild, necessitating some clips to be shot for it, such as Henstridge's. The sequence was designed and created by the series' post production supervisor, Daniel Spilatro. Jamie Jirak of ComicBook.com called this opening "next level", while Alex McLevy of The A.V. Club described it as "delightful". Bam! Smack! Pow!'s Wesley Cobrun felt the opening was "outstanding" and likened it to the opening sequence of the 1970s television series Wonder Woman, but with the font from the series M*A*S*H.

=== Filming ===
The episode was shot in mid-April 2019, with the scenes on the New York City streets filming on the Warner Bros. backlot. The opening shot of the episode was a homage to Saturday Night Fever. Director Stan Brooks utilized many filming techniques from the 1970s, such as snap zooms and whip pans, to make the episode feel like a 1970s television series.

=== Visual effects ===
The hatch opening underwater to reveal a rocket silo for launching "Project Insight", all created through computer-generated imagery, was considered a standout visual effects sequence from the episode for visual effects supervisor Mark Kolpack along with viewers. Kolpack first created storyboards of the sequence, before designing the rocket with his team; the design was based on actual rockets from the "1970s era", including Apollo 11. Extensive research was done on actual rockets to depict the launch accurately, down to "the deflected flames that then transitioned to the huge plume of smoke". Long simulations were run to create the water pouring into the silo from outside the hatch, while the shot where the hatch first opens under the water was even more difficult. Creating the correct amount of mist coming off the water was also a challenge.

=== Marvel Cinematic Universe tie-ins ===
"Project Insight", a major plot point in Captain America: The Winter Soldier (2014), is featured heavily, due to the Chronicoms altering the timeline so its deployment is 40 years sooner than established in the films. Like in The Winter Soldier, "Project Insight" is targeting high-level assets, such as Bruce Banner, Peggy Carter, Victoria Hand, Nick Fury, Robert Gonzales, Jim Morita, and Isabelle Hartley. Other names were also included in the episode as Easter eggs, including other characters who have appeared in the series or comics. Roger Dooley, the Strategic Scientific Reserve New York chief from Agent Carter, is also referenced in the episode.

== Release ==
"A Trout in the Milk" was first aired in the United States on ABC on June 24, 2020.

== Reception ==
=== Ratings ===
In the United States the episode received a 0.2 percent share among adults between the ages of 18 and 49, meaning that it was seen by 0.2 percent of all households in that demographic. It was watched by 1.37 million viewers. The 0.2 percent share was the lowest for the series. Within a week of release, "A Trout in the Milk" was watched by 2.42 million viewers.

=== Critical response ===
Christian Houlb of Entertainment Weekly gave the episode a "B−". Speaking to the use of "Project Insight" in the episode, Houlb said while the MCU connections in the series "have faded a bit in recent years", he enjoyed "this direct callback. Plus, critics have often compared The Winter Soldier to '70s conspiracy thrillers like The Parallax View (1974), so it is fun to imagine its plot happening in the actual '70s." CinemaBlend 's Laura Hurley felt it was "pretty funny" that the series "just destroyed the premise of Captain America: The Winter Soldier, when The Winter Soldier totally blew up the premise of Agents of S.H.I.E.L.D. halfway through S.H.I.E.L.D.'s first season". Trent Moore at Syfy Wire called the inclusion of "Project Insight" a "great callback to the film universe, and a truly organic one." He continued saying that "If the Chronicoms really want to help Hydra stamp out S.H.I.E.L.D., what better way than accelerating their eventual plan as laid out in the films?" In his review of the episode, Alex McLevy from The A.V. Club said "The return of Project Insight was such an inventive way to combine S.H.I.E.L.D.'s latest enemies and its oldest ones, it's a shame it ended up just being a one-off premise, albeit one that created a real cliffhanger for the episode." He added that the "wrinkles" introduced by the Chronicoms, such as keeping Wilfred and Nathaniel Malick alive, "helps the show keep fresh a formula that might otherwise begin feeling a little too pat." However, McLevy felt the series was "still dragging its heels" regarding Leo Fitz and Simmons, despite Simmons having "some moments of real significance" in the episode. Overall, he gave the episode a "B−". Giving the episode 4.5 stars out of 5, Michael Ahr at Den of Geek exclaimed the "sheer depth of the Marvel references" in the episode "distinguishes it from all others before it", calling "A Trout in the Milk" an "excellent" episode. Wesley Coburn at Bam! Smack! Pow! called the episode "the first real filler episode of the season", adding there were "too much uncomfortable possibly-romantic pairing of characters", and gave it a "B−".
