= Adapt or Die (Agents of S.H.I.E.L.D.) =

- Agents of S.H.I.E.L.D. episode
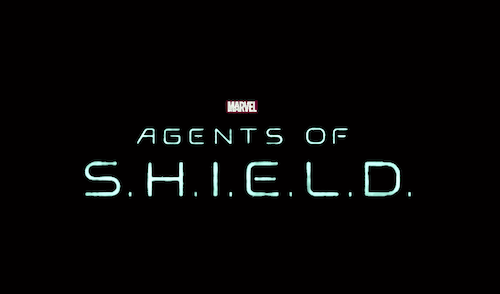
- The episode utilizes the season five typeface logo
- Episode no.: Season 7 Episode 6
- Directed by: Aprill Winney
- Written by: DJ Doyle
- Cinematography by: Kyle Jewell
- Editing by: Kelly Stuyvesant
- Original air date: July 1, 2020
- Running time: 42 minutes

Guest appearances
- Joel Stoffer as Enoch; Tamara Taylor as Sibyl; Tobias Jelinek as Luke; Thomas E. Sullivan as Nathaniel Malick; Paulina Bugembe as Lilla Mackenzie; Dawan Owens as Ford; Sedale Threatt Jr. as John Mackenzie; Shakira Barrera as King; Patrick Warburton as Rick Stoner; Enver Gjokaj as Daniel Sousa

Episode chronology
← Previous "A Trout in the Milk"	Next → "The Totally Excellent Adventures of Mack and The D"
- Agents of S.H.I.E.L.D. season 7

"Adapt or Die" is the sixth episode of the seventh season of the American television series Agents of S.H.I.E.L.D. Based on the Marvel Comics organization S.H.I.E.L.D., it follows a Life Model Decoy (LMD) of Phil Coulson and his team of S.H.I.E.L.D. agents as they race to stop the Chronicoms from unraveling history in the 1970s. It is set in the Marvel Cinematic Universe (MCU) and acknowledges the franchise's films. The episode was written by DJ Doyle and directed by Aprill Winney.

Clark Gregg reprises his role as Coulson from the film series, starring alongside Ming-Na Wen, Chloe Bennet, Elizabeth Henstridge, Henry Simmons, Natalia Cordova-Buckley, and Jeff Ward. The episode remains in 1976 after the characters traveled to that year in the previous episode. Guest stars Enver Gjokaj, reprising his role of Daniel Sousa from the MCU series Agent Carter, and Patrick Warburton, reprising his role as Rick Stoner from season five, return from previous episodes in the season.

"Adapt or Die" originally aired on ABC on July 1, 2020, and was watched by 1.32 million viewers.

== Plot ==
Following the events of "A Trout in the Milk", against General Rick Stoner's orders, the Lighthouse automatically fires missiles at Zephyr One, damaging the time drive. While Deke Shaw, Jemma Simmons, and Enoch attempt to repair it, Shaw discovers that Simmons has a memory implant that blocks her knowledge of Leo Fitz's location while retaining information on time travel. Simmons urges Shaw not to reveal this to the others. While in Stoner's custody, Melinda May identifies a Chronicom infiltrator with her empathetic abilities and its lack of emotions. Deducing the Chronicoms are replacing S.H.I.E.L.D.'s agents with their Hunters, she and the Phil Coulson LMD escape from their detainment and save Stoner before the Chronicoms can steal his face and memories. Along the way, Coulson discovers the Chronicoms' ship and encounters their predictor Sibyl. After speaking with her about the Chronicoms' plans, he sacrifices himself to destroy their ship and Hunters while May and Stoner escape.

Meanwhile, Elena "Yo-Yo" Rodriguez and Alphonso "Mack" Mackenzie rescue the latter's parents from the Lighthouse and meet up with May. While escaping in their quinjet however, May realizes that Mack's parents are actually Chronicoms who killed and replaced the real ones, forcing Mack to throw them from the quinjet. Concurrently, Nathaniel Malick experiments on Daisy Johnson and transplants her Inhuman powers to himself. However, he is unable to control them as they break his bones and demolish the building around him, allowing Johnson and Daniel Sousa to escape and return to Zephyr One. After it jumps, Johnson is placed in a healing pod while Mack steps out to mourn. Shaw leaves to check on him, but they are stranded when Zephyr One unexpectedly jumps through time again.

== Production ==
=== Development ===
After the sixth season finale of Agents of S.H.I.E.L.D. aired in August 2019, showrunners Jed Whedon, Maurissa Tancharoen, and Jeffrey Bell revealed that the seventh season would feature the team trying to save the world from invasion by the Chronicoms. They use time travel to do this, allowing the season to explore the history of S.H.I.E.L.D. Later that month, one of the season's episodes was revealed to be titled "Adapt or Die" and written by DJ Doyle. It was confirmed to be the sixth episode of the season in June 2020, when Aprill Winney was revealed to have directed it. Winney had shadowed Agents of S.H.I.E.L.D. director Garry A. Brown in season six, as "Adapt or Die" was her first time directing a television episode with stunts and visual effects; Winney previously worked more on kids and family television.

=== Writing ===
This episode introduces Jemma Simmons' biological implant, which she has named D.I.A.N.A. (Digital Implanted Axon Neurotransmission Attenuator). Simmons actress Elizabeth Henstridge had gotten engaged during the previous episode and named her engagement ring Diana, speaking openly about the ring by that name when Henstridge returned to filming. As such, Tancharoen reached out to Henstridge letting her know the writers and producers decided to call the implant D.I.A.N.A. as well.

=== Casting ===
With the season renewal, main cast members Ming-Na Wen, Chloe Bennet, Elizabeth Henstridge, Henry Simmons, Natalia Cordova-Buckley, and Jeff Ward were confirmed to be returning from previous seasons as Melinda May, Daisy Johnson / Quake, Jemma Simmons, Alphonso "Mack" Mackenzie, Elena "Yo-Yo" Rodriguez, and Deke Shaw, respectively. Series star Clark Gregg also returns as Phil Coulson, portraying a Life Model Decoy version of the character in the seventh season.

Guest starring in the episode are Joel Stoffer as Enoch, Tamara Taylor as Sibyl, Tobias Jelinek as Luke, Thomas E. Sullivan as Nathaniel Malick, Paulina Bugembe as Lilla Mackenzie, Dawan Owens as Agent Ford, Sedale Threatt Jr. as John Mackenzie, Patrick Warburton as General Rick Stoner, and Enver Gjokaj reprising his Agent Carter role of agent Daniel Sousa; all returning from earlier episodes of the season. They are joined by Shakira Barrera as Agent King.

=== Filming ===
Director of photography Kyle Jewell suggested a crane be used when filming in Sibyl's void, which director Aprill Winney felt helped "bring the dynamism" to an empty room with two people.

== Release ==
"Adapt or Die" was first aired in the United States on ABC on July 1, 2020.

== Reception ==
=== Ratings ===
In the United States the episode received a 0.3 percent share among adults between the ages of 18 and 49, meaning that it was seen by 0.3 percent of all households in that demographic. It was watched by 1.32 million viewers. Within a week of release, "Adapt or Die" was watched by 2.38 million viewers.

=== Critical response ===
The A.V. Club's Alex McLevy gave the episode a "B", saying the episode "successfully integrates its various subplots with optimal pacing" thanks to "strong direction and a solid script". Coulson's conversation with Sibyl "was elegantly crafted, giving him a chance to deliver a stirring speech about humanity without it feeling trite or hokey". He called the Simmons subplot explaining about her memory chip the episode's only weak spot. McLevy concluded, "It wasn't always fun to watch, but for being one of the show's periodic downer installments, it remained lively and compelling throughout, balancing the adventure and pathos more successfully than in" the last episode. Michael Ahr of Den of Geek felt the failures endured in the episode made "for the perfect season midpoints as the characters face the most overwhelming odds yet, framing what will presumably be their seemingly impossible comeback in the back half", giving the episode 4.5 stars out of 5. Trent Moore at Syfy Wire felt Coulson's line "Dying? It's kind of my superpower." was "one of the show's greatest" and that Sousa and Daisy had "a great bit of chemistry" in their scenes, noting "Sousa really gets a chance to shine". Matt Webb Mitovich from TVLine said that after the first five episodes had "light-hearted time-travel hijinks", "Adapt or Die" had "harder-hitting drama" which resulted in an "incredibly eventful episode". Giving the episode a "B−", Christian Houlb at Entertainment Weekly said the episode "reach[s] new depths for the season" and called Mack learning his parents were Chronicoms "the most brutal stuff in [the] episode". Wesley Coburn from Bam! Smack! Pow! was more critical of the episode, giving it a "C", and saying it "answers a lot of questions, but at the expense of character development and excessive action.".
