= Alien Commies from the Future! =

- Agents of S.H.I.E.L.D. episode
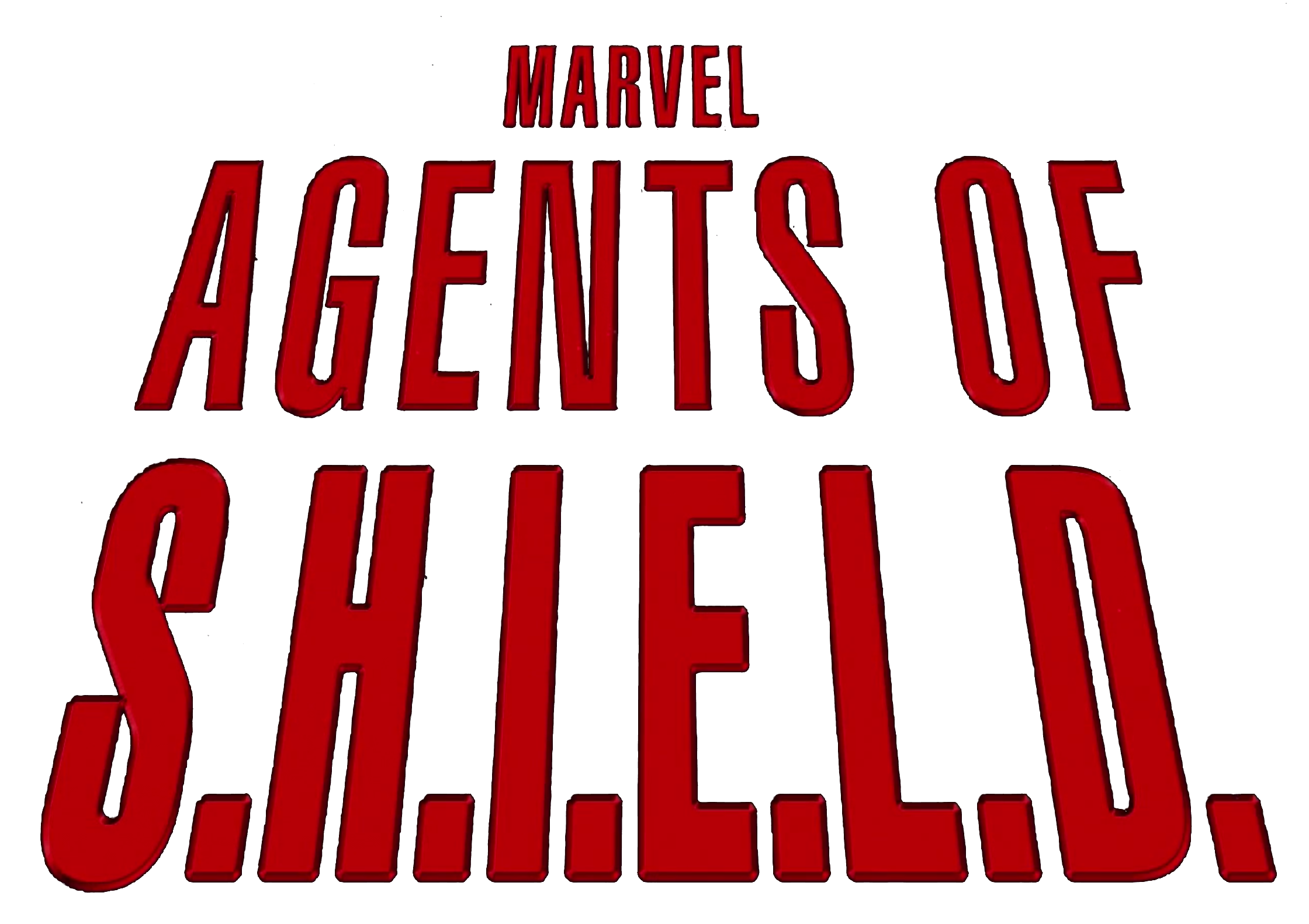
- Title card for the episode, using a 1950s "classic sci-fi" theme reflective of the episode's 1955 Area 51 setting
- Episode no.: Season 7 Episode 3
- Directed by: Nina Lopez-Corrado
- Written by: Nora Zuckerman; Lilla Zuckerman
- Cinematography by: Allan Westbrook
- Editing by: Kelly Stuyvesant
- Original air date: June 10, 2020
- Running time: 42 minutes

Guest appearances
- Enver Gjokaj as Daniel Sousa; Tobias Jelinek as Luke; Julian Acosta as Pascal Vega; Michael Gaston as Gerald Sharpe; Tamara Taylor as Sibyl

Episode chronology
← Previous "Know Your Onions"	Next → "Out of the Past"
- Agents of S.H.I.E.L.D. season 7

"Alien Commies from the Future!" is the third episode of the seventh season of the American television series Agents of S.H.I.E.L.D. Based on the Marvel Comics organization S.H.I.E.L.D., it follows a Life Model Decoy (LMD) of Phil Coulson and his team of S.H.I.E.L.D. agents as they race to stop the Chronicoms from unraveling history in 1955. It is set in the Marvel Cinematic Universe (MCU) and acknowledges the franchise's films. The episode was written by Nora and Lilla Zuckerman and directed by Nina Lopez-Corrado.

Clark Gregg reprises his role as Coulson from the film series, starring alongside Ming-Na Wen, Chloe Bennet, Elizabeth Henstridge, Henry Simmons, Natalia Cordova-Buckley, and Jeff Ward. The episode moves to Area 51 in 1955 after the season explored the 1930s in the first two episodes. Filming took place in deserts around California, with authentic period costumes designed for the episode. Guest star Enver Gjokaj reprises his role of Daniel Sousa from the MCU series Agent Carter.

"Alien Commies from the Future!" originally aired on ABC on June 10, 2020, and was watched by 1.57 million viewers. The episode received generally positive reviews, particularly for its fun tone, but with mixed responses for its attempts to address the racism and misogyny of the era.

== Plot ==
The Chronicoms meet with their Predictor, Sibyl, to confirm that their latest plan to eliminate S.H.I.E.L.D. from history will succeed. Meanwhile, the agents land in 1955 near Area 51, a S.H.I.E.L.D. base currently working on Project Helius, an ion fusion reactor prototype. The agents kidnap high ranking agent Gerald Sharpe so the Phil Coulson LMD can impersonate him while Jemma Simmons impersonates S.H.I.E.L.D.'s then-current director, Peggy Carter, to locate Chronicom infiltrators. However, they unexpectedly run into Carter's former partner Daniel Sousa, who immediately outs them and has them detained. Concurrently, Alphonso "Mack" Mackenzie, Melinda May, Deke Shaw, and Inhuman agent Elena "Yo-Yo" Rodriguez attempt to interrogate Sharpe to find out more about Project Helius. Though he puts up resistance, he eventually reveals Helius cannot function without a powerful energy source, leading Deke to deduce that the Chronicoms plan to sacrifice one of their own to activate the weapon and destroy the base.

Agent Daisy Johnson arrives undercover and convinces Sousa to free her teammates just as a pair of Chronicoms enact their plan. May and Yo-Yo's first attempt to stop them fails after the former unexpectedly suffers a panic attack and the latter fails to use her powers, just like last episode. Recovering quickly once Area 51 is evacuated, they pursue one of the Chronicoms while Coulson battles the other. Johnson and Simmons improve a S.H.I.E.L.D. EMP device in time to disable Helius, along with the entire base, the Chronicoms, and Coulson. The other agents regroup at their mobile headquarters, Zephyr One, while Sousa detains Coulson and Mack and Shaw pose as aliens to avoid changing history while returning Sharpe to the desert.

== Production ==
=== Development and writing ===
After the sixth season finale of Agents of S.H.I.E.L.D. aired in August 2019, showrunners Jed Whedon, Maurissa Tancharoen, and Jeffrey Bell revealed that the seventh season would feature the team trying to save the world from invasion by the Chronicoms. They used time travel to do this, allowing the season to explore the history of S.H.I.E.L.D. Later that month, one of the season's episodes was revealed to be titled "Alien Commies from the Future!" and written by Nora and Lilla Zuckerman. It was confirmed to be the third episode of the season in June 2020, when Nina Lopez-Corrado was revealed to have directed it.

Nora Zuckerman revealed there were a few title options for the episode, but "Alien Commies from the Future!" was chosen because "it had the best ring to it" and felt like "a cool '50s monster movie title". After being assigned the third episode of the season, the Zuckerman siblings knew the episode was going to be set in either the 1940s or 1950s, and at one point was considering the Roswell UFO incident to be the backdrop for the episode. Jed Whedon ultimately suggested using Area 51, which Nora called "perfect" since "it fit with the MCU timeline".

=== Casting ===
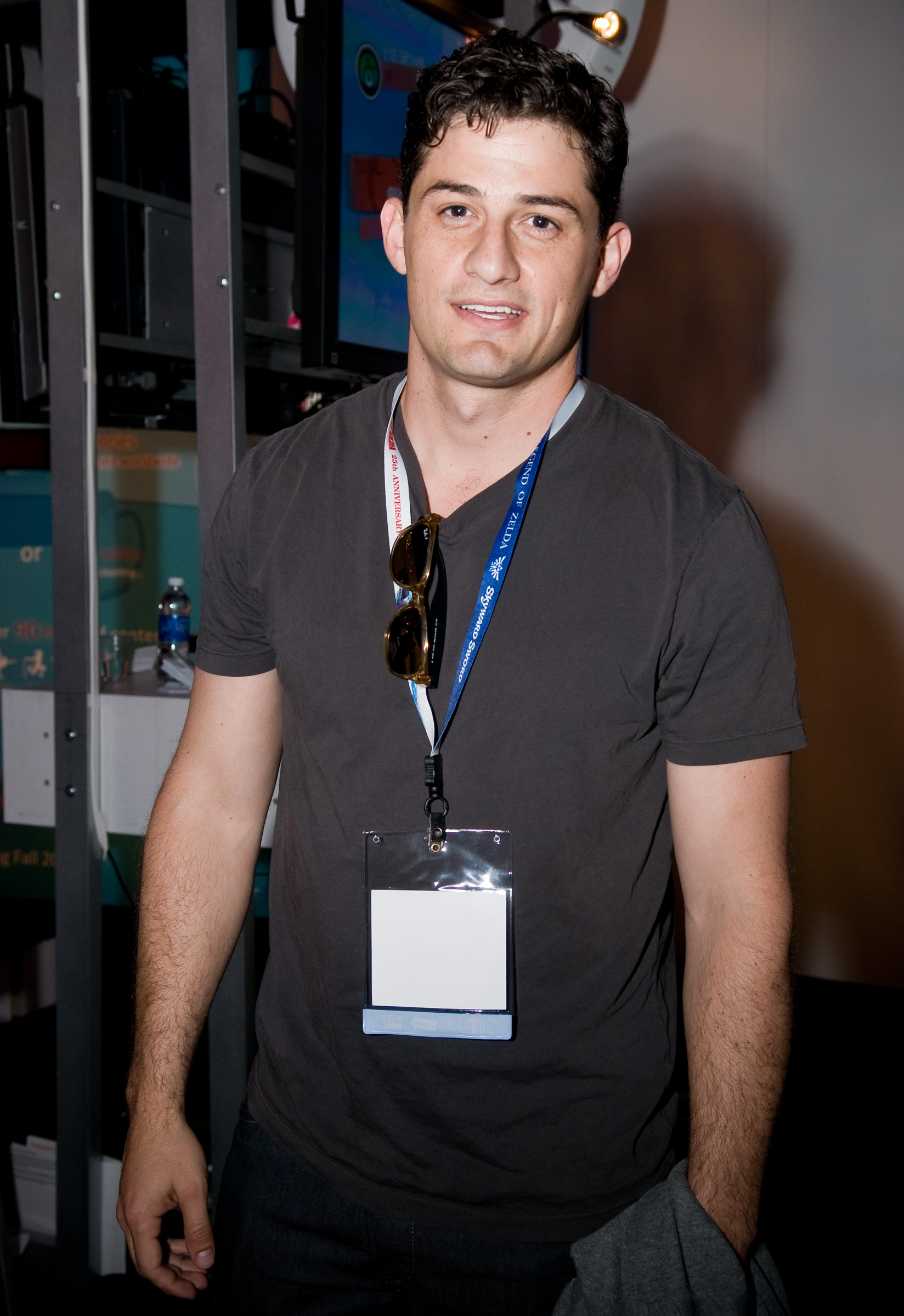
Enver Gjokaj makes his first appearance in the series with this episode, reprising his Agent Carter role of Daniel Sousa

With the season renewal, main cast members Ming-Na Wen, Chloe Bennet, Elizabeth Henstridge, Henry Simmons, Natalia Cordova-Buckley, and Jeff Ward were confirmed to be returning from previous seasons as Melinda May, Daisy Johnson / Quake, Jemma Simmons, Alphonso "Mack" Mackenzie, Elena "Yo-Yo" Rodriguez, and Deke Shaw, respectively. Series star Clark Gregg also returns as his character Phil Coulson, portraying a Life Model Decoy version of the character in the seventh season.

In August 2019, Enver Gjokaj was expected to reprise his role as Agent Daniel Sousa from the series Agent Carter, which was confirmed in April 2020. Whedon and Tancharoen previously worked with Gjokaj on Dollhouse and were excited to explore his character further on S.H.I.E.L.D. They had discussed having Gjokaj appear in previous seasons of the series, with discussion about revisiting Sousa with flashbacks at different points during the series, or having Gjokaj reprise his minor role from The Avengers as a New York City cop, before deciding that it would make sense to include him in a crossover with Agent Carter during the final season due to the time travel storyline. Gjokaj felt the storyline allowed the series to "open up". Bell said Sousa would be seen in a "different light", and would bring a new flavor to the series' character dynamics, with Gjokaj adding the character had become "a bit of a 007, but mostly in the ways of intrigue and espionage" since the events of Agent Carter. Whedon added that having Sousa allows Coulson, a "fanboy for S.H.I.E.L.D. history", to interact with that history. Gjokaj guest stars in "Alien Commies from the Future!" alongside Tobias Jelinek as Luke, Julian Acosta as Pascal Vega, Michael Gaston as Gerald Sharpe, and Tamara Taylor as the Chronicom predictor Sibyl. Jelinek returns from the first two episodes of the season.

Julian Acosta is married to the episode's director, Nina Lopez-Corrado, and Nora Zuckerman called Acosta "absolutely perfect" to play Vega. One of the reasons Taylor was cast was for her voice. Taylor stated she had "no point of reference" for portraying Sibyl, but was given "some pretty key notes" such as to make her more soothing, calming, and in control than the other Chronicoms. Taylor tried to do this while still making the character "somewhat creepy". Sibyl's hairstyle was also suggested by Taylor.

=== Design ===
==== Costumes ====
Costume designer Whitney Galitz said the 1950s "didn't just mean poodle skirts and sherburts", and she wanted to use some saturated colors to contrast with the "dusty and muted tones of the desert town". Imogene Chayes of Marvel's Visual Development group provided concept art for the costumes.

Galitz wanted to stay true to the costumes used for Sousa in Agent Carter, while updating them for the 1950s setting and for his new position at the Area 51 base. She also took inspiration from Cary Grant for the character. Sousa's suit was created by High Society Custom Tailor. For Simmons undercover as Peggy Carter, Galitz built a "power suit" using a "Dior silhouette jacket with the nipped in waist and a no-nonsense pencil skirt" that she hoped was reminiscent of Carter's costumes from Agent Carter while looking correct for Simmons and the 1950s setting. Galitz created a custom suit for Coulson undercover using glen plaid fabric sourced by High Society. The vintage ties in the episode were also created by Galitz's team. May and Yo-Yo go undercover in the episode as test pilots, which is accurate for women in the period. The idea for this was suggested by Wen, and Nora Zuckerman said it "worked perfectly for the episode". Galitz based the costumes worn by the pair on the uniforms used by members of the Women Airforce Service Pilots.

==== Title sequence ====
This episode moves to Area 51 in 1955 and features a title card with a font that "appears to be lifted from a classic alien invasion movie", evoking a 1950s "classic sci-fi" style to reflect the setting. An "outer spacey" rendition of the opening music is also heard. Michal Schick of Hypable felt the title card was "deliciously kitschy".

=== Filming ===
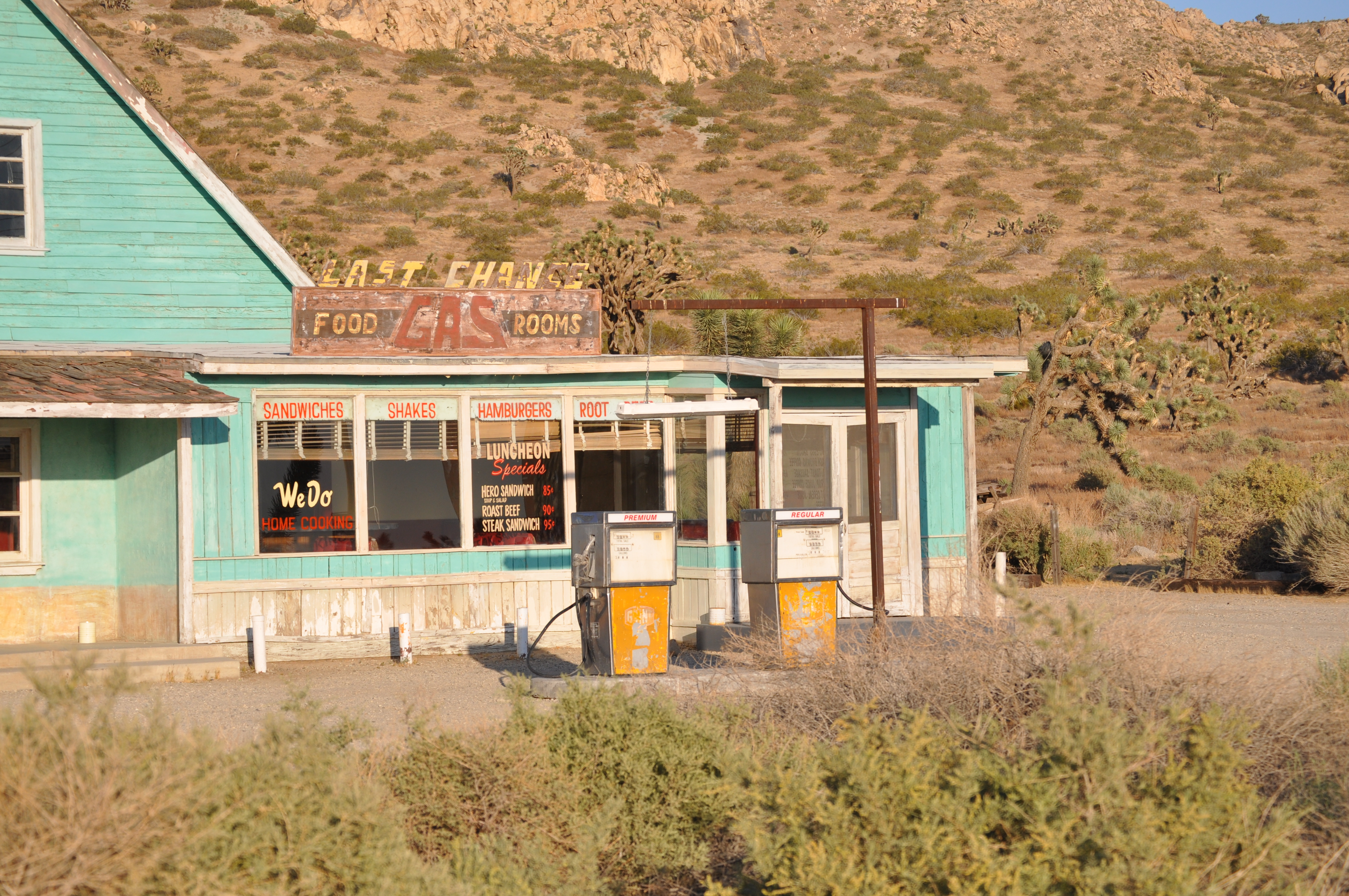
The Club Ed diner set used in the episode

Director Nina Lopez-Corrado was going for a "Coen brothers kind of look" with the episode, resulting in slight changes to the way the episode was shot compared to other episodes of the series. Examples included not shooting actors over the shoulder and having "clean POVs". Filming for the episode's opening scene, where the team arrives in 1955, and for the diner took place at Lancaster, California. Lopez-Corrado called the diner location, a set known as "Club Ed", "perfect because we needed a diner and it had to be in the desert," adding that the location is "a blank space" allowing the production designer to bring in the desired set pieces and props. Area 51 was filmed at Mystery Mesa in Santa Clarita, California. Due to recent wet weather in the area, the desert appears greener in the episode than the crew had planned.

=== Visual effects ===
Visual effects for the Zephyr arriving in 1955 were created by FuseFX. Rhythm and Hues created the Helius explosion, while CoSA VFX provided the effects for the Chronicom connecting to Helius and for the time stream that the Chronicoms study. For the Quinjet at the end of the episode, visual effects supervisor Mark Kolpack asked for a large fan to be used on set to simulate the wind that the Quinjet would be creating. The fan had to be turned off when it blew sand all over actor Michael Gaston, and due to the scene being filmed at the end of the day there was not enough time to retrieve an alternative. Kolpack directed the visual effects for the scene to attempt to explain why there was no wind on Gaston by adjusting the angle of the Quinjet.

=== Marvel Cinematic Universe tie-ins ===
References are made to Sousa's involvement in the second season of Agent Carter, including the defeat of Hugh Jones and the Council of Nine.

== Release ==
"Alien Commies from the Future!" was first aired in the United States on ABC on June 10, 2020.

== Reception ==
=== Ratings ===
In the United States the episode received a 0.3 percent share among adults between the ages of 18 and 49, meaning that it was seen by 0.3 percent of all households in that demographic. It was watched by 1.57 million viewers. Viewership increased from the previous episode, while the rating share was the same. Within a week of release, "Alien Commies from the Future!" was watched by 2.66 million viewers.

=== Critical response ===
Matt Webb Mitovich of TVLine called "Alien Commies from the Future!" "one of Agents of S.H.I.E.L.D.'s most entertaining episodes ever", highlighting the dialogue and 1950s elements such as the title card, while Christian Holub at Entertainment Weekly graded the episode a "B+". Syfy Wire's Trent Moore also felt this was the first episode of the season "that really felt 'fun' in that Marvel-y way this series has pioneered at this point" after the first two "had to do a bit of narrative heavy-lifting". Moore also pointed out "the writers continue to have a deft handling of addressing issues of race and sexism" of the era, show the bathrooms being segregated and how General Sharpe might talk to Deke because he was a white male. He enjoyed Coulson's fight with the Chronicom, saying it was "something straight out of a Terminator movie". Writing for Bam! Smack! Pow!, Wesley Coburn graded the episode an "A−", saying "packed a solid mix of heavy emotional toll underneath a glossy outer coating of nostalgic chrome brightness, making for a very solid episode overall."

Awarding the episode a "B", The A.V. Club's Alex McLevy felt the episode was "a mostly solid installment of the time-hop mission" adding "the Area 51 sequence is fleet and funny, and some solid fight choreography helps maintain momentum." Highlights for McLevy were the sequence where Coulson and Simmons tried to find the Chronicoms, particularly Coulson repeating the word "moist" and using the replicant test from Blade Runner, and the period appropriate technology, sets, and costumes. Unlike Moore, McLevy felt the attempt to address the social issues of the era were less successful, saying "The series is probably wise to keep tap-dancing around the virulent racism and misogyny of these past eras... but the only thing using it as a minor plot point does is remind the viewer of what lengths they're going to in order to dodge the subject the rest of the time". Michael Ahr from Den of Geek felt the episode was extremely current, and that examining some of the racism from the 1950s and exploring UFO culture helped elevate an "otherwise okay episode". Ahr called Sousa's appearance the "highlight" of the episode, and was a reminder "that Agent Carter ended too soon". He also, like McLevy, enjoyed the Chronicom interrogation sequence. However, Ahr felt the plot of the episode "wasn't all that compelling overall" and ultimately gave the episode 3.5 out of 5 stars. Michal Shick at Hypable called the episode "gosh-darned delightful" explaining, "From giddily feigned identities to terrifying moments that force agents to question their essential selves, "Alien Commies From the Future!" keeps nudging our heroes to probe at deep and important uncertainties." However, Shick felt the series "still hasn't quite found its lane as far as translating historical attitudes towards race into its sci-fi aesthetic", with some of this commentary "land[ing] with something of an ungraceful thunk."
