= The Totally Excellent Adventures of Mack and The D =

- Agents of S.H.I.E.L.D. episode
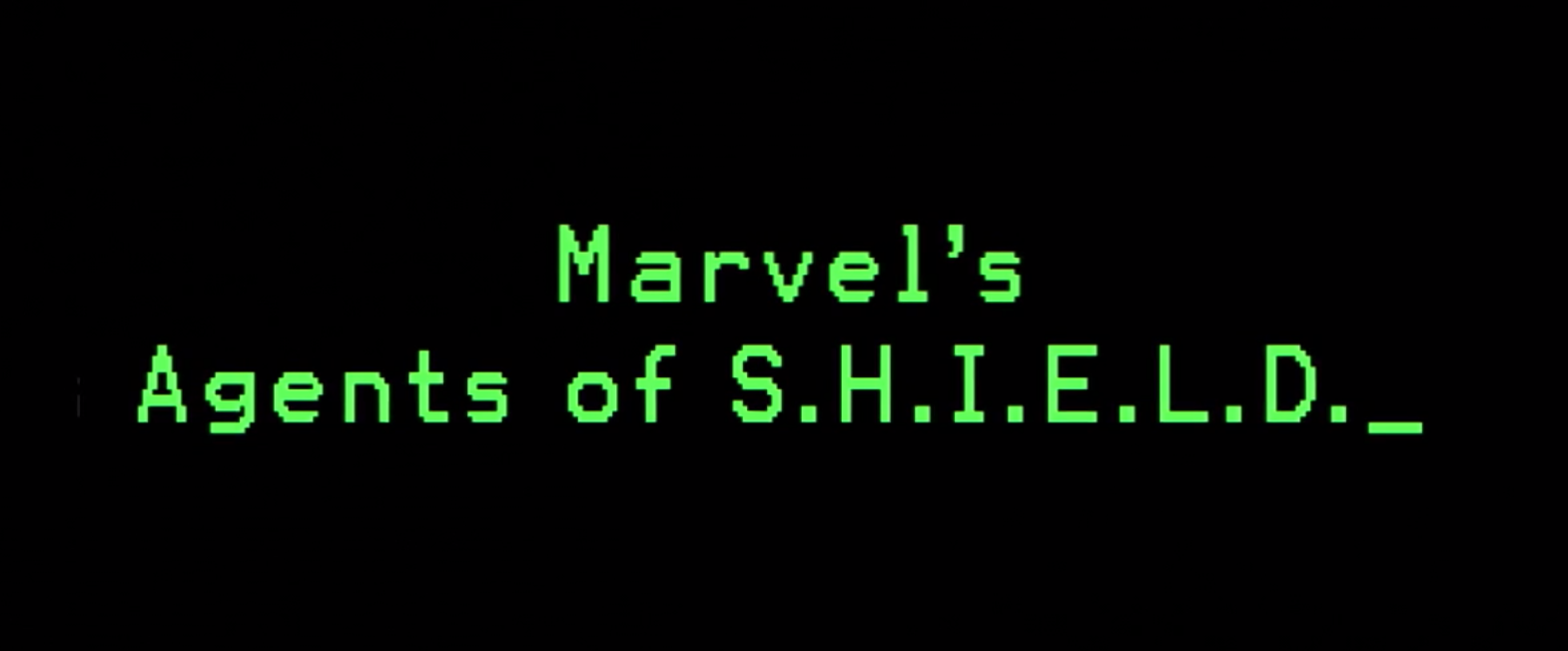
- Title card for the episode, an homage to the "tech and hacker movies" of the 1980s
- Episode no.: Season 7 Episode 7
- Directed by: Jesse Bochco
- Written by: Brent Fletcher
- Cinematography by: Allan Westbrook
- Editing by: Eric Litman
- Original air date: July 8, 2020
- Running time: 43 minutes

Guest appearances
- Jolene Andersen as Olga Pachinko; Austin Basis as Russell Feldman; Ryan Donowho as Cricket; Tipper Newton as Roxy Glass; Tamara Taylor as Sibyl

Episode chronology
← Previous "Adapt or Die"	Next → "After, Before"
- Agents of S.H.I.E.L.D. season 7

"The Totally Excellent Adventures of Mack and The D" is the seventh episode of the seventh season of the American television series Agents of S.H.I.E.L.D. Based on the Marvel Comics organization S.H.I.E.L.D., it follows a team of S.H.I.E.L.D. agents as they race to stop the Chronicoms from unraveling history in the 1980s. It is set in the Marvel Cinematic Universe (MCU) and acknowledges the franchise's films. The episode was written by Brent Fletcher and directed by Jesse Bochco.

Clark Gregg reprises his role as Phil Coulson from the film series, starring alongside Ming-Na Wen, Elizabeth Henstridge, Henry Simmons, Natalia Cordova-Buckley, and Jeff Ward. The episode begins after the end of the previous one, with Alphonso "Mack" Mackenzie (Simmons) and Deke Shaw (Ward) stranded in the 1980s. The episode pays homage to various media from the 1980s. Practical effects were used to create the killer robots and the gallons of blood featured in the episode, with less visual effects used compared to other episodes of the series. The episode also includes Ward performing the song "Don't You (Forget About Me)" by Simple Minds.

"The Totally Excellent Adventures of Mack and The D" originally aired on ABC on July 8, 2020, and was watched by 1.39 million viewers. The episode received generally positive reviews for its fun tone and 1980s references, though some reviewers felt these references went too far or were a detriment to the series' storytelling and characters.

== Plot ==
Following the events of "Adapt or Die", S.H.I.E.L.D. agents Alphonso "Mack" Mackenzie and Deke Shaw are stranded in 1982 after their mobile headquarters, Zephyr One, unexpectedly jumps through time without them. After losing his parents to the Chronicoms, a despondent Mack purchases a house and spends the next year in isolation while Shaw occasionally checks on him. In 1983, Shaw manages to convince Mack to come see his band, The Deke Squad, as they perform 1980s songs that have not been written yet, such as "Don't You (Forget About Me)". After their performance, Shaw reveals most of his band are actually S.H.I.E.L.D. recruits and that the Phil Coulson LMD survived destroying the Chronicoms' ship by saving his "mind" onto an external hard drive. However, Mack is not impressed by Shaw and his recruits, berating the former for his apparent immaturity and belittling the latter within earshot of them before storming off.

Concurrently, having also survived after her "mind" was trapped in the local power grid, Chronicom predictor Sibyl manipulates lonely programmer, Russell Feldman, into building a crude robotic body for her. Once she is able to, she builds Hunter robots to kill the programmer before using them to attack S.H.I.E.L.D.'s base, the Lighthouse, and retrieve her Time Stream. After Shaw's team fail to stop the robots, Mack returns to join the fray after he learns that Shaw has been watching over his younger self. Together, the agents manage to destroy the hunter robots, but fail to notice a small one escaping with the Time Stream. Sometime later, Agents Melinda May and Elena "Yo-Yo" Rodriguez arrive and reunite with Mack and Shaw before Shaw gets May up to speed on what happened. Elsewhere, the robot travels a vast distance before delivering the Time Stream to Nathaniel Malick, who survived 1976 and aligned himself with Sibyl.

== Production ==
=== Development ===
After the sixth season finale of Agents of S.H.I.E.L.D. aired in August 2019, showrunners Jed Whedon, Maurissa Tancharoen, and Jeffrey Bell revealed that the seventh season would feature the team trying to save the world from invasion by the Chronicoms. They used time travel to do this, allowing the season to explore the history of S.H.I.E.L.D. Later that month, one of the season's episodes was revealed to be titled "The Totally Excellent Adventures of Mack and The D" and written by Brent Fletcher. It was confirmed to be the seventh episode of the season in July 2020, when Jesse Bochco was revealed to have directed it. Following the ending of the previous episode, "The Totally Excellent Adventures of Mack and The D" is set during the 1980s. The title of the episode is a reference to the 1989 film Bill & Ted's Excellent Adventure. Fletcher stated it was determined at the beginning of the season that, while the specifics were unknown, one of the episodes would be "Chopping Mall-esque".

=== Writing ===
With Alphonso "Mack" Mackenzie and Deke Shaw stranded in 1982, Deke actor Jeff Ward said his character "kind of finds a way to thrive in" the time period. Mack, after the death of his parents in the previous episode, hits rock bottom in the episode, which actor Henry Simmons said was necessary to show since "we've seen [Mack] be strong so much". Ward added that "it's a hard thing that could be trivialized in [the] world [of the show], and it's not [...] there's a feeling of what real loss feels like, and how real people deal with it and come together to overcome it ... It led to a really human experience that I think people will relate to." Deke can also relate to Mack after losing his own parents at a young age.

The episode pays homage to various media from the 1980s, including Max Headroom (Coulson's resurrection), Short Circuit and Chopping Mall (the new Chronicom bodies), Doctor Who's Daleks (a Chronicom screaming "Exterminate"), The Breakfast Club (using "Don't You (Forget About Me)" in the episode), The Terminator (Chronicom hunters HUD), WarGames (Sybil reaching out to Russell), Weird Science (Russell falling in love with Sybil), Commando (Mack's suit up montage), Predator (Mack and Shaw's handshake), The A-Team ("the classic montage intro" when Shaw introduces the members of his Deke Squad), Top Gun, E.T. the Extra-Terrestrial, Rambo, Back to the Future, MacGyver, and campy slasher films. Other 1980s television tropes were also used. Ward said while the episode was shot "earnestly", there was also "a side-eye kind of making fun of it at the same time".

=== Casting ===
With the season renewal, main cast members Ming-Na Wen, Chloe Bennet, Elizabeth Henstridge, Henry Simmons, Natalia Cordova-Buckley, and Jeff Ward were confirmed to be returning from previous seasons as Melinda May, Daisy Johnson / Quake, Jemma Simmons, Alphonso "Mack" Mackenzie, Elena "Yo-Yo" Rodriguez, and Deke Shaw, respectively. Series star Clark Gregg also returns as his character Phil Coulson, portraying the consciousness of his Life Model Decoy version, visualized as Coulson appearing on a television set. Although credited, Bennet does not appear in the episode.

Guest stars returning from past episodes of the season include Tamara Taylor as Sibyl and Thomas E. Sullivan as Nathaniel Malick (uncredited). Also guest starring are Jolene Andersen as agent Olga Pachinko, Austin Basis as Russell Feldman, Ryan Donowho as Cricket, Matt and John Yuan as agents Ronnie and Tommy Chang, and Tipper Newton as agent Roxy Glass. The latter's character name is a reference to Ron Glass, who was a guest star in the first season of the series. Several journalists, including Chancellor Agard of Entertainment Weekly, served as background extras at the bar during Deke Squad's performance. Matt and John Yuan had auditioned for another part in the episode "Fear and Loathing on the Planet of Kitson" (also written and directed by Fletcher and Bochco) in season six and did not get cast. However, Fletcher "loved them so much" and when crafting "The Totally Excellent Adventures of Mack and The D", knew the brothers would work as Deke's best friends. As a result, the Yuans did not have to audition again for the parts.

=== Design ===
The title card for the episode features "Marvel's Agents of S.H.I.E.L.D." being typed on a black computer screen in a "throwback green font of the first generation of computers". Since the episode pays homage to "tech and hacker movies" of the 1980s such as WarGames, Ian Cardona at Comic Book Resources felt this title card was "a simple but totally effective introduction" for the episode.

=== Filming and effects ===
Filming of the episode occurred from the mid- to the end of May 2019. Remote controlled robots were created for the episode. There were some software issues with getting the robots to work on set, but the team working on them was able to get "the software to work and [the] robots did what they were supposed to" according to visual effects supervisor Mark Kolpack, who added that there was nothing for the visual effects team to "clean-up" for the robots. Discussing the remote controlled robots on set, Ward said, "When you see these things in the hallway on patrol and it just rolls in and turns — it feels alive." Simmons added that at times, seeing the robots moving down the dark hallway was "freaky and scary" since they had "a life of [their] own". Blood was also created practically for the episode by the series' special effects team, with "gallons of blood" used on the set. This was done as a reference to the idea that "Everything in the 1980s was overly done." The resurrected Coulson was also created on set, with footage of Gregg played on the television for the other actors to interact with. Gregg was shot three times, with him looking at the camera and to the left and right of the camera, to allow the takes to be edited together to create the effect.

Visual effects for the episode included adding red lasers for Sybil; adding paintball hits to the training sequence; showing the Zephyr's time jump, which reused some of an old visual effects shot featuring the Bus; and creating the explosion for when Sybil is blown up. The latter was the "big" visual effects shot for the episode, with Kolpack noting that the episode had a lot less visual effects in it compared to other episodes of the series, and that the amount of visual effects would "ramp up" for the rest of the season.

=== Music ===
"Don't You (Forget About Me)" by Simple Minds is performed by Shaw and his band, which they claim is their own since the song was not yet written in 1982. Other 1980s songs had been considered, including "Money for Nothing" by Dire Straits, but these were abandoned because Ward was not familiar with them. Shaw's costume while performing was based on the music video for "Working for the Weekend" by Loverboy.

Ward was nervous filming his performance but said "once we were able to just go and I stopped thinking about it [and] could just kind of do it — it became so fun and one of my favorite things that I've ever gotten to film". Ward watched David Bowie, Prince, Elvis Presley, and Bruce Springsteen to help inform his performance in part because he believed that Shaw would have watched them. He also watched Bowie perform at Live Aid 1985, which Simple Minds had played "Don't You (Forget About Me)" at. This helped Ward create a backstory for Shaw, imagining that his time between seasons five and six was spent catching up on history, including watching Live Aid. He also felt it would be easier to replicate Simple Minds than Bowie. Shaw also changes one of the "babies" in the lyrics to "Daisy" as a way to express his feelings to Daisy "just in case he never got back" to her.

== Release ==
"The Totally Excellent Adventures of Mack and The D" was first aired in the United States on ABC on July 8, 2020.

== Reception ==
=== Ratings ===
In the United States the episode received a 0.3 percent share among adults between the ages of 18 and 49, meaning that it was seen by 0.3 percent of all households in that demographic. It was watched by 1.39 million viewers. Within a week of release, "The Totally Excellent Adventures of Mack and The D" was watched by 2.44 million viewers.

=== Critical response ===
Giving the episode an "A−", Christian Houlb of Entertainment Weekly felt the episode "had as much fun as possible with" its premise, feeling it was "a nice counter to how heavy things have gotten recently". He could also tell that the writers were "more familiar with the vibe of the 80s than the previous decades", since the episode featured multiple references to the era such as "glam rock, superteam action movies, and a little bit of Cold War" where as past episodes focused only on one or two references. Writing for Bam! Smack! Pow!, Wesley Coburn gave the episode an "A+" and said it "was a standout standalone adventure that mixed humor with pathos, with just enough character and action to make things interesting. By far the best episode yet this season." Trent Moore from Syfy Wire said "Agents of S.H.I.E.L.D. has done a lot of wild things over the years, but this beautifully weird homage to everything about the 1980s is arguably the craziest. It's a standalone work of eclectic, throwback joy — but cut down the middle with a year of mourning for one of the show's fan favorite characters." He added that "The Totally Excellent Adventures of Mack and The D" was "among the best standalone-ish episodes the series has ever attempted".

Reviewing the episode, Alex McLevy of The A.V. Club felt as if the writers were trying to mimic the fun nature of the DC Comics series Legends of Tomorrow with the episode. He said, "while it's hard to not smile at the fey but likable tributes to retro horror-comedy tropes, it's also not exactly bold or original, either. It mostly elicits some knowing chuckles, a breezy and enjoyable episode that bends the series' format in ways that are broad and occasionally too cute by half", and compared the episode to "Fear and Loathing on the Planet of Kitson" from season six. McLevy gave the episode a "B−". Michael Ahr at Den of Geek said, "although the movie allusions were entertaining and appreciated, the stylistic narrative choices felt very much out of place" with "the whole episode feeling a bit like a parody of itself." He gave the episode 3 out of 5 stars. Matt Webb Mitovich from TVLine felt the episode was a letdown, describing it as "a well-intended but tonally wayward misfire". Mitovich conceded the episode was "every bit the love letter to the decade that it promised to be" but amidst all that, "it felt like actual storytelling opportunities were missed." For him, Mack's storyline was disappointing, likening his downward spiral to "Bro Thor" seen in Avengers: Endgame (2019), and called the Deke Squad storyline "just this side of too silly". Mitovich concluded, "If the events of this episode had taken place in an alternate reality or dream, then the over-the-top humor would have worked ... But as a very real juncture in the S.H.I.E.L.D. agents' final mission, it fell flat for me".

Chopping Mall director and co-writer Jim Wynorski was not enthused about the episode, claiming he had not been informed about the references used and that the episode was "overtly plagiarizing other people's creative hard work". Conversely, when the series had referenced the film in the season four episode "Broken Promises", Wynorski messaged Fletcher, who also wrote the season four episode, thanking him for referencing the film and sent Fletcher an autographed Blu-ray of the film.
