= Out of the Past (Agents of S.H.I.E.L.D.) =

- Agents of S.H.I.E.L.D. episode
- The opening of the episode pays homage to the "iconic" Sunset Boulevard (1950) opening, with a title card that is a "throwback-style credit intro".
- Episode no.: Season 7 Episode 4
- Directed by: Garry A. Brown
- Written by: Mark Leitner
- Narrated by: Clark Gregg
- Cinematography by: Kyle Jewell
- Editing by: Eric Litman
- Original air date: June 17, 2020
- Running time: 43 minutes

Guest appearances
- Joel Stoffer as Enoch; Tobias Jelinek as Luke; Neal Bledsoe as Wilfred "Freddy" Malick; Larry Clarke as a bar patron; Enver Gjokaj as Daniel Sousa

Episode chronology
← Previous "Alien Commies from the Future!"	Next → "A Trout in the Milk"
- Agents of S.H.I.E.L.D. season 7

"Out of the Past" is the fourth episode of the seventh season of the American television series Agents of S.H.I.E.L.D. Based on the Marvel Comics organization S.H.I.E.L.D., it follows a Life Model Decoy (LMD) of Phil Coulson and his team of S.H.I.E.L.D. agents as they race to stop the Chronicoms from unraveling history in 1955. It is set in the Marvel Cinematic Universe (MCU) and acknowledges the franchise's films. The episode was written by Mark Leitner and directed by Garry A. Brown.

Clark Gregg reprises his role as Coulson from the film series, starring alongside Ming-Na Wen, Chloe Bennet, Elizabeth Henstridge, Henry Simmons, Natalia Cordova-Buckley, and Jeff Ward. The episode remains in 1955 after the characters traveled to that year in the previous episode, but takes on a film noir tone and is shown almost entirely in black and white; the episode was filmed in color like other episodes of the series before being re-graded to be black and white. Its title is a reference to the 1947 noir film of the same name. Guest star Enver Gjokaj reprises his role of Daniel Sousa from the MCU television series Agent Carter.

"Out of the Past" originally aired on ABC on June 17, 2020, and was watched by 1.40 million viewers. It received generally positive reviews for its noir tone and black and white imagery.

== Plot ==
Following the events of "Alien Commies from the Future!", the Phil Coulson LMD has been arrested by S.H.I.E.L.D. Agent Daniel Sousa for trespassing on Area 51. Coulson is currently seeing the world in black-and-white and hearing an internal monologue due to damage sustained while battling the Chronicoms. Realizing today is the day Sousa is killed by the Russians after delivering vital technology to Howard Stark, Coulson uses his historical knowledge to impersonate Sousa's contact and convince him they are to pick up the device while in transit. He also makes contact with his team via their Chronicom ally Enoch to let them know what he is doing.

Agents Elena "Yo-Yo" Rodriguez and Deke Shaw pick up the device, but the latter is kidnapped by Hydra agents and taken to their boss, Wilfred Malick, who has since become a high-ranking S.H.I.E.L.D. officer since Deke last encountered him in 1931. Despite the danger, Deke manages to convince Malick to let him go after reminding the latter that he spared his life. After Chronicoms attack them on the way, Coulson and his team evacuate Sousa onto their mobile headquarters, Zephyr One, posing as top-secret government operatives to maintain history. Following Melinda May's uncharacteristic behavior around Sousa and the device, scientist Jemma Simmons discovers May acquired the ability to experience others' emotions.

When Sousa reveals that he knows Hydra has infiltrated S.H.I.E.L.D., Coulson deduces that the former actually killed him to prevent him from revealing their secret. After conferring with Director Alphonso "Mack" Mackenzie and Agent Daisy Johnson, they decide to find a way to save Sousa without changing history. Suspicious of the team's intentions however, Sousa flees Zephyr One to make his delivery. He successfully makes it to the rendezvous point and delivers the device before the modern day agents tranquilize him, allowing Coulson to impersonate him and fake his death. Back onboard Zephyr One, Coulson tells Sousa that they are S.H.I.E.L.D. agents from the future, and that to protect the timeline, he cannot go back to 1955. Simmons repairs Coulson as the team jumps to 1973. Unbeknownst to them, a Chronicom stayed behind to propose an alliance with Malick.

== Production ==
=== Development ===
After the sixth season finale of Agents of S.H.I.E.L.D. aired in August 2019, showrunners Jed Whedon, Maurissa Tancharoen, and Jeffrey Bell revealed that the seventh season would feature the team trying to save the world from invasion by the Chronicoms. They used time travel to do this, allowing the season to explore the history of S.H.I.E.L.D. Later that month, one of the season's episodes was revealed to be titled "Out of the Past" and written by Mark Leitner. It was confirmed to be the fourth episode of the season in June 2020, when Garry A. Brown was revealed to have directed it. The episode's title is a reference to the 1947 noir film of the same name.

=== Writing ===
The episode is set in 1955, like the previous one, but takes on a film noir tone, with most of the episode in black and white. In the episode, the Phil Coulson Life Model Decoy is malfunctioning, becoming the framing device for the noir tone, with Coulson seeing everything in black and white and having an internal monologue, thus serving as the episode's narrator. Bell had the idea to do an episode in black and white at the start of the season, which director Garry A. Brown felt was "so unique" to do for a television episode. Whedon added that it was not "a gimmick" since being in black and white had a story point and logic attached to it, making it "an instant sell". Enver Gjokaj spoke about Daniel Sousa joining the S.H.I.E.L.D. team at the end of the episode, saying "he's on the ride for the time being". Gjokaj added that Sousa is "very conflicted about being taken out of time, as you can imagine, because of all of the things that he had to love for in that time period."

=== Casting ===
With the season renewal, main cast members Ming-Na Wen, Chloe Bennet, Elizabeth Henstridge, Henry Simmons, Natalia Cordova-Buckley, and Jeff Ward were confirmed to be returning from previous seasons as Melinda May, Daisy Johnson / Quake, Jemma Simmons, Alphonso "Mack" Mackenzie, Elena "Yo-Yo" Rodriguez, and Deke Shaw, respectively. Series star Clark Gregg also returns as his character Phil Coulson, portraying a Life Model Decoy version of the character in the seventh season.

Enver Gjokaj reprises his Agent Carter role of agent Daniel Sousa in "Out of the Past", guest starring alongside Joel Stoffer as Enoch and Tobias Jelinek as Luke, all returning from earlier episodes of the season. They are joined by Neal Bledsoe as Wilfred Malick, a character introduced in earlier episodes as a younger man in 1931 portrayed by Darren Barnet. Barnet had discussed playing the older version of the character with old-age make-up while filming his appearances as the younger Malick, but the production chose to cast an older actor because the age difference was too much. Larry Clarke also guest stars.

=== Design ===
The episode's opening sequence is an homage to Sunset Boulevard's (1950) "iconic opening of the dead body floating in a pool", with a title card that is a "throwback-style credit intro". When designing the costumes in the episode, costume designer Whitney Galitz had to create costumes that would work in both black and white and color, since they are featured both ways in the episode. Galitz felt some of her color and pattern choices "work[ed] well on the body but when shown in [black and white looked] totally different". Her fittings with Cordova-Buckley were photographed in both color and black and white to help see what would work in the episode.

=== Filming and visual effects ===
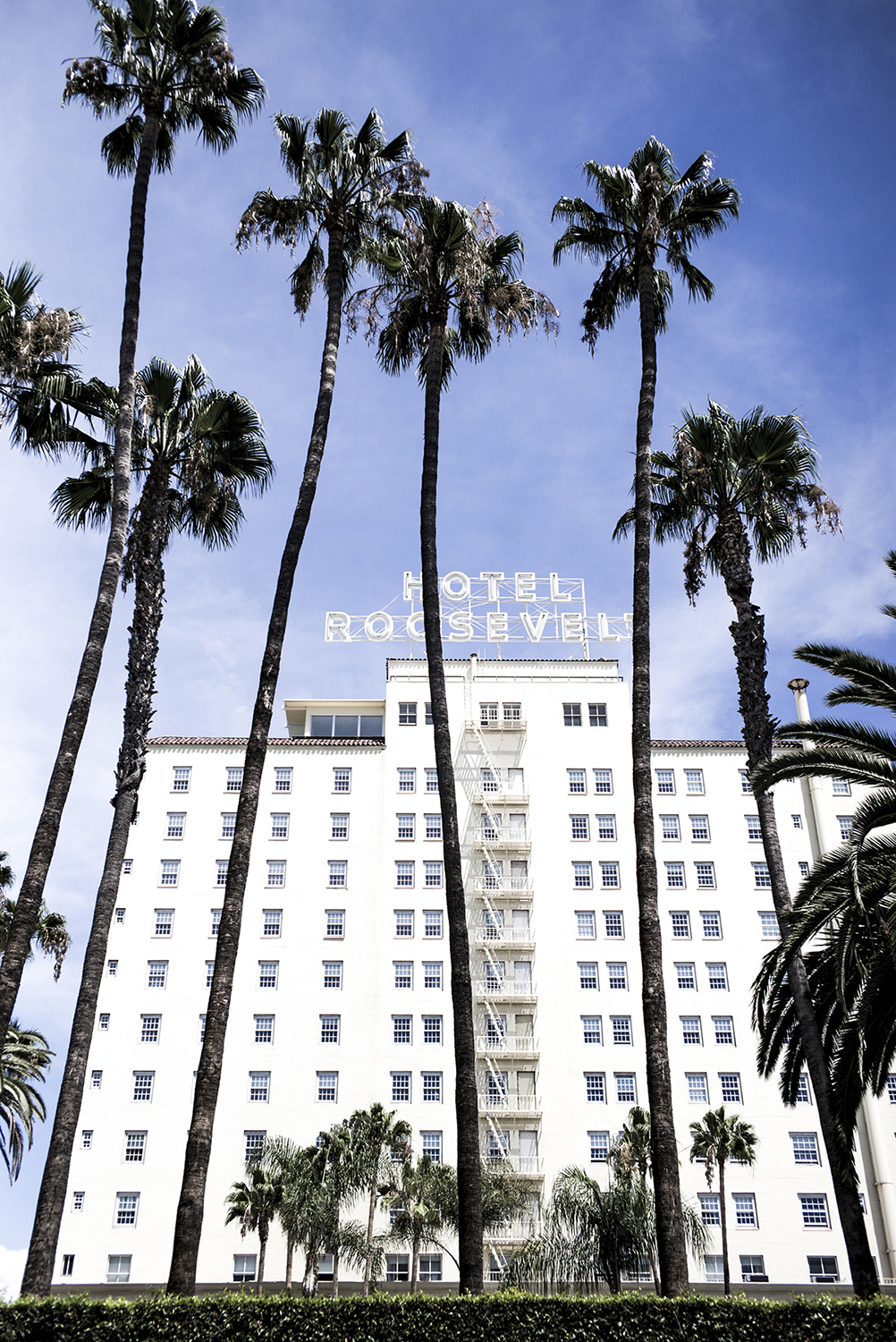
The Hollywood Roosevelt Hotel featured prominently in the episode

The episode was filmed in color, and all the visual effects were created in color as they normally would be. The episode was then color graded to be in black and white. The video monitors on set were also in black and white to aid in shooting the episode. Agents of S.H.I.E.L.D. films with zoom lens, but for this episode, director Garry A. Brown chose 29 mm, 50 mm, 75 mm, and 100 mm prime lens "to help with the 1950s authenticity". Brown said "the favorite" lens was the 29 mm "because you could get in nice and close to the actors and you also stay wide enough to see the environment that you're shooting in". To be further authentic, Brown utilized many tight shots on the actors and the mechanism on the camera that could quickly change the shot to a Dutch angle. Cinematographer Kyle Jewell used a light filter over the camera lens to give lights in the episode a "bloom quality", which was compared to the 1959 television series The Twilight Zone. The sequences with Coulson and Sousa on the train were filmed on an actual train, rather than using green screen. Filming on the train reminded Gjokaj of filming on Agent Carter because of the period wardrobe and setting and the many extras used. The Hollywood Roosevelt Hotel was one of the locations in Los Angeles the episode was able to shoot at, since the episode was set in the city.

=== Music ===
"No More Mr. Nice Guy" by Alice Cooper was featured at the end of the episode to indicate the team's time jump to 1973.

== Release ==
"Out of the Past" was first aired in the United States on ABC on June 17, 2020.

== Reception ==
=== Ratings ===
In the United States the episode received a 0.3 percent share among adults between the ages of 18 and 49, meaning that it was seen by 0.3 percent of all households in that demographic. It was watched by 1.40 million viewers. Within a week of release, "Out of the Past" was watched by 2.47 million viewers.

=== Critical response ===
Writing for Bam! Smack! Pow!, Wesley Coburn gave the episode an "A", saying the episode was "a wild ride through trying times that succeeds brilliantly." Trent Moore at Syfy Wire called "Out of the Past" "a fun one, and you can tell [the creators are] pulling out all the stops for the final few adventures." In his episode recap, Entertainment Weekly's Christian Houlb felt the episode was "a pretty fun noir parody". Alex McLevy of The A.V. Club gave the episode a "B+", saying it "isn't a perfect episode, but it's so much fun that it manages to coast by on the strength of its numerous charms". He felt the episode fully committed to the noir premise by going "beyond mere black and white imagery to utilize hardened gumshoe voiceover, [and] a bevy of canted camera angles". Den of Geek's Michael Ahr said the episode "found a clever way to tell a rather mundane story, and in some ways it was successful in upending expectations and delivering on its mysteries." He felt the smaller moments, such as Yo-Yo and Deke's conversation and May discovering her powers, were "the more powerful" in the episode. He also enjoyed Sousa's character arc, and awarded the episode 3.5 stars out of 5.
