= Peggy Carter =

Fictional character

- Peggy Carter on the cover of Captain America: Peggy Carter, Agent of S.H.I.E.L.D. #1 (Dec. 2014). Art by Siya Oum.

Publication information
- Publisher: Marvel Comics
- First appearance: Unnamed and obscured: Tales of Suspense #75 (March 1966); Unnamed: Tales of Suspense #77 (May 1966); As Peggy Carter: Captain America #162 (March 1973)
- Created by: Stan Lee (writer); Jack Kirby (artist)

In-story information
- Full name: Margaret Elizabeth "Peggy" Carter
- Team affiliations: Daughters of Liberty; S.H.I.E.L.D.; Avengers
- Supporting character of: Captain America
- Notable aliases: Dryad, Agent 13
- Abilities: Skilled martial artist and hand-to-hand combatant, markswoman, and tactician

Margaret Elizabeth "Peggy" Carter is a fictional character appearing in American comic books published by Marvel Comics. She is usually depicted as a supporting character in books featuring Captain America. Created by writer Stan Lee and artist Jack Kirby, she debuted, unnamed, in Tales of Suspense #75 as a World War II love interest of Steve Rogers in flashback sequences. She would later be better known as the aunt of Sharon Carter.

Hayley Atwell portrayed the character in several projects of the Marvel Cinematic Universe from 2011 to 2019, including films, a short film, and television series, before playing alternate versions of the character known as Captain Carter in the animated series What If...? (2021–2024) and the film Doctor Strange in the Multiverse of Madness (2022), with the comic book version of the character subsequently being redesigned after Atwell.

== Publication history ==
The character debuted in a single panel (and unnamed) as a wartime love interest of Captain America in Tales of Suspense #75 (March 1966), and then receiving a backstory in #77 (May 1966). She was created by writer Stan Lee and artist Jack Kirby. She appeared again as the older sister of Sharon Carter in Captain America #161 (May 1973). She was later retconned as Sharon's aunt, then later great-aunt, due to the unaging nature of comic book characters. The character has appeared frequently in Captain America stories set during World War II.

== Fictional character biography ==
Dr. Peggy Carter joins the French Resistance as a teenager and becomes a skilled fighter, who serves on several operations alongside Captain America. The two fall in love, but an exploding shell gives her amnesia and she is sent to live with her parents in Virginia.

During the "Original Sin" storyline, it was revealed in 1952 that Peggy Carter worked with Howard Stark and Woody McCord when they investigated an alien ship in Siberia. The three of them worked to keep the alien from being taken by Hydra and had the alien live with Anton Vanko.

In the 1960s, Peggy Carter joins S.H.I.E.L.D. for a long tenure.

At the time when Captain America resurfaced, Peggy Carter was taking treatments from Doctor Faustus. When she was rescued by Captain America, she maintained her friendship with him.

Peggy Carter later helped Captain America fight the Secret Empire. She also dealt with his decision to stop being Captain America for a while.

Peggy helps Captain America when her niece Sharon Carter and some S.H.I.E.L.D. Agents went missing while gathering information on the new Grand Director.

Peggy Carter later joined the Avengers' support staff at Avengers Mansion.

Following her retirement, Peggy lives in a nursing home, where she eventually dies. Following her death, S.H.I.E.L.D. erects a memorial statue outside the S.H.I.E.L.D. Academy in Newark.

Through unknown means, Peggy Carter is resurrected and becomes a founding member of the Daughters of Liberty as Dryad. She assists the group in clearing Captain America's name when he is framed for Thunderbolt Ross' death.

== Abilities ==
Peggy Carter is shown to be a superb martial artist, also excelling in using firearms. She is a highly trained spy and tactician.

As Dryad, Peggy wears a type of battle armor that is strong enough to protect her from a missile attack and keep her insulated when it is ablaze.

== Other versions ==
=== Amalgam Comics ===
Mademoiselle Peggy, a fusion of Peggy Carter and DC Comics character Mademoiselle Marie, appears in the Amalgam Comics one-shot Super-Soldier: Man of War.

=== Exiles ===
An alternate universe variant of Peggy Carter who became Captain America, based on Hayley Atwell's likeness and adapted from a similar character created for Marvel Puzzle Quest, appears in Exiles (vol. 3).

=== Captain Carter ===
A character based on the What If...? character Captain Peggy Carter appears in a self-titled comic. Similarly to Captain America, this version was cryogenically frozen during WWII and thawed out in the present day. Additionally, a separate Captain Carter appears in Avengers Forever #4 as a member of Avenger Prime's army.

==== In other media ====
- Captain Carter originates from the Disney+ series What If...?, voiced by Hayley Atwell.
- Atwell reprised the role in the live-action film Doctor Strange in the Multiverse of Madness.

=== House of M ===
An alternate universe variant of Peggy Carter appears in "House of M". This version married Captain America shortly after WWII due in part to him having never been frozen.

=== Spider-Gwen ===
An alternate universe variant of Peggy Carter from Earth-65 appears in Spider-Gwen. This version is the long-lived director of S.H.I.E.L.D. who, similarly to Nick Fury, wears an eyepatch.

== In other media ==
=== Television ===
- Peggy Carter appears in the "Captain America segment" of The Marvel Super Heroes, voiced by Vita Linder.
- Peggy Carter, based on the MCU incarnation, appears in Avengers Assemble, voiced by Hayley Atwell.

=== Marvel Cinematic Universe ===
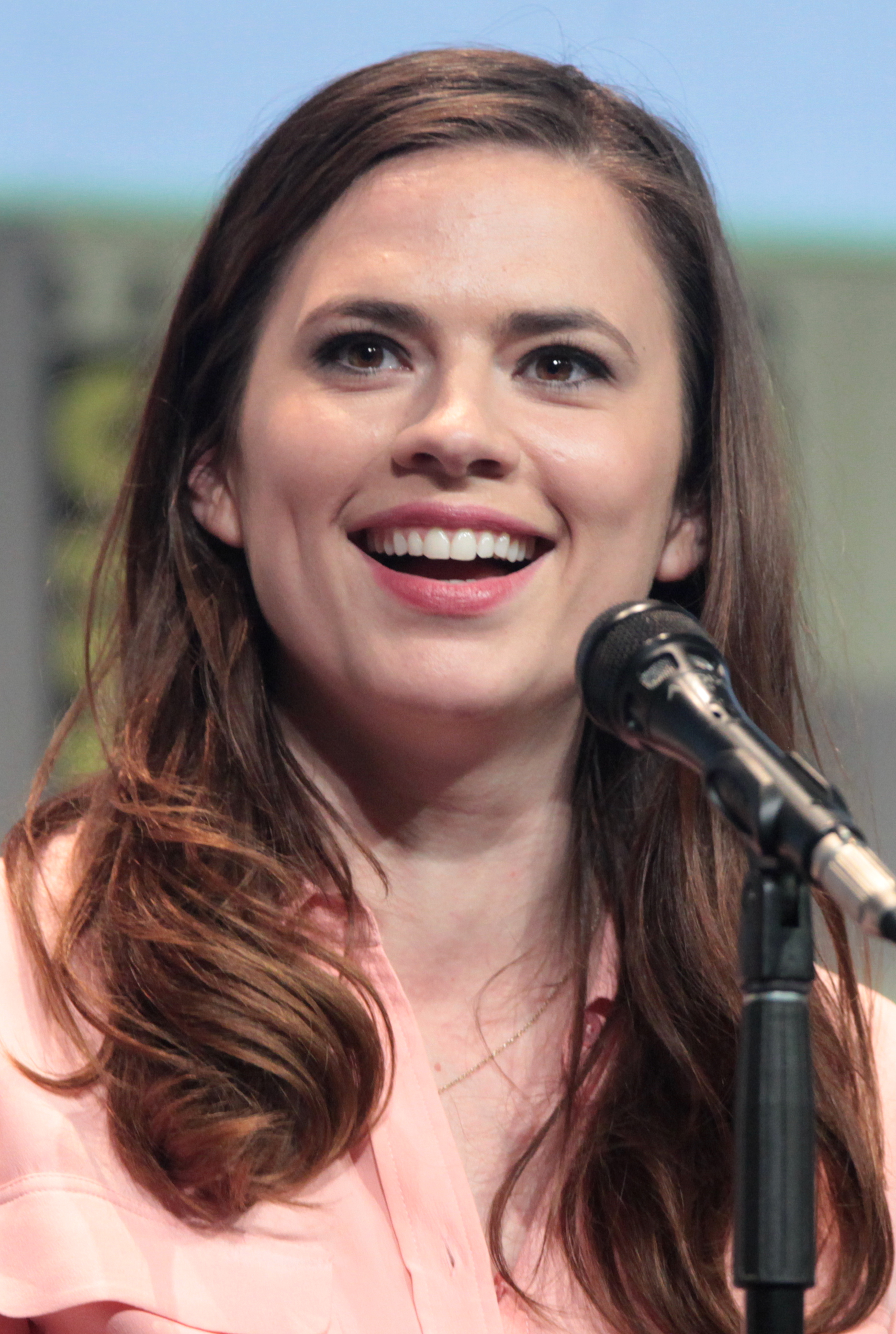
Hayley Atwell, who portrays Peggy Carter in the MCU, at San Diego Comic-Con in 2015

Peggy Carter appears in media set in the Marvel Cinematic Universe (MCU), portrayed by Hayley Atwell. This version is a British agent of the Strategic Scientific Reserve (SSR), co-founder of S.H.I.E.L.D. alongside Howard Stark, and aunt of Sharon Carter. She first appears in the live-action film Captain America: The First Avenger before making subsequent appearances in the live-action Marvel One-Shot Agent Carter, the live-action TV series Agent Carter, Agents of S.H.I.E.L.D., and the live-action films Captain America: The Winter Soldier, Avengers: Age of Ultron, and Ant-Man. While she does not appear in the live-action film Captain America: Civil War, she is stated to have died. Additionally, alternate timeline variants of Peggy appear in the live-action films Avengers: Endgame and Doctor Strange in the Multiverse of Madness (2022) as well as the Disney+ animated series What If...?. Atwell will reprise the role in the upcoming film Avengers: Doomsday.

=== Video games ===
- Peggy Carter, based on the MCU incarnation, appears in Captain America: Super Soldier, voiced again by Hayley Atwell.
- Peggy Carter appears in Lego Marvel's Avengers, voiced again by Hayley Atwell.
- Multiple incarnations of Peggy Carter appear as playable characters on Marvel Puzzle Quest. These include an alternate universe variant who became her universe's Captain America; "Iron Carter", a variant who wields a version of Iron Man's armor; and another who wields Mjolnir.
- Peggy Carter as Captain America appears in Lego Marvel Super Heroes 2.
