= Agent Carter (TV series) =

2015–2016 Marvel Television series

- Genre: Action; Spy
- Created by: Christopher Markus; Stephen McFeely
- Based on: Peggy Carter by: Stan Lee; Jack Kirby
- Showrunners: Tara Butters; Michele Fazekas; Chris Dingess
- Starring: Hayley Atwell; James D'Arcy; Chad Michael Murray; Enver Gjokaj; Shea Whigham
- Composer: Christopher Lennertz
- Country of origin: United States
- Original language: English
- No. of seasons: 2
- No. of episodes: 18

Production
- Executive producers: Alan Fine; Stan Lee; Joe Quesada; Kevin Feige; Louis D'Esposito; Jeph Loeb; Christopher Markus; Stephen McFeely; Chris Dingess; Michele Fazekas; Tara Butters; Jim Chory
- Producer: Sara E. White
- Production location: Los Angeles, California
- Cinematography: Gabriel Beristain (season 1); Edward J. Pei (season 2)
- Editors: Chris Peppe; Troy Takaki; David J. Siegel; Mark Hartzell; Christopher Cooke; Andrew Doerfer
- Running time: 41–43 minutes
- Production companies: ABC Studios; Marvel Television; Fazekas & Butters

Original release
- Network: ABC
- Release: January 6, 2015 – March 1, 2016

Related
- Agents of S.H.I.E.L.D.; Marvel Cinematic Universe television series

Marvel's Agent Carter, or simply Agent Carter, is an American television series created by Christopher Markus & Stephen McFeely for ABC, based on the Marvel Comics character Peggy Carter following her roles in the 2011 film Captain America: The First Avenger and the 2013 Marvel One-Shot short film also titled Agent Carter. It is set in the Marvel Cinematic Universe (MCU) and shares continuity with the franchise's films and other television series. The series was produced by ABC Studios, Marvel Television, and Fazekas & Butters, with Tara Butters, Michele Fazekas, and Chris Dingess serving as showrunners.

The series stars Hayley Atwell as Peggy Carter, reprising her role from the film series and One-Shot, with James D'Arcy, Chad Michael Murray, and Enver Gjokaj also starring; they are joined by Shea Whigham for the first season. In the series, Carter must balance life as a secret agent with that of a single woman in 1940s America. Development on a series inspired by the short film had begun by September 2013, with Atwell's involvement confirmed in January 2014. That May, ABC ordered the show straight to series. Agent Carter introduces the origins of several characters and storylines from MCU films, while other characters from the films also appear.

The first season, consisting of eight episodes, originally aired from January 6 to February 24, 2015, while the second season, consisting of 10 episodes, originally aired from January 19 to March 1, 2016. Both seasons aired during mid-season breaks of the television series Agents of S.H.I.E.L.D. Agent Carter received a positive critical response, but viewership fell and ABC canceled the series on May 12, 2016.

== Premise ==
The first season takes place in 1946, with Peggy Carter having to balance the routine office work she does for the Strategic Scientific Reserve (SSR) in New York City with secretly helping Howard Stark, who is framed for supplying deadly weapons to enemies of the United States. Carter is assisted by Stark's butler, Edwin Jarvis, to find those responsible and dispose of the weapons. In the second season, set approximately six months to a year following the events of the first season in 1947, Carter moves from New York City to Los Angeles to deal with the threats of the new Atomic Age by the Council of Nine in the aftermath of World War II. In the season, she gains new friends, a new home, and a potential new love interest.

== Cast and characters ==
- Hayley Atwell as Peggy Carter:
  An SSR agent initially stuck doing administrative work. Butters said Carter's "superpower is the fact that other people underestimate her. And she often uses that to her advantage". On the influence that the apparent death of Steve Rogers has on Carter, Atwell explained that "he was the greatest person she ever knew—even before he took the serum and became Captain America. She knew his character and she saw a kindred spirit in him. So I think she's grieving the loss of him but she's also determined to make sure that his work wasn't in vain. That gives her a tremendous amount of determination to carry on despite the obstacles that she comes across." Gabriella Graves portrays a young Carter.
- James D'Arcy as Edwin Jarvis:
  Howard Stark's butler and ally to Carter, who will eventually be a tutor to Tony Stark and inspire his J.A.R.V.I.S. artificial intelligence. Atwell referred to Carter's relationship with Jarvis as the series' "comic relief", and said "she needs someone who is in contact with Howard to help kind of run this mission[, and] they have this very witty banter back and forth". Fazekas explained that some of the character's persona "has come from the comics and some of it we've developed ourselves. Some of it is influenced by James D'Arcy himself and his strengths." D'Arcy was initially nervous about portraying Jarvis's comedic side, given his history of "predominantly play[ing] psychopaths". He did not study Paul Bettany's performance as J.A.R.V.I.S. when approaching the character.
- Chad Michael Murray as Jack Thompson:
  A war veteran and agent with the SSR, described as chauvinistic and "chest-puffing". Murray compared the character to Indiana Jones, and stated that "he's working his way up to become the head of the SSR. His goal in life is to just be great at his job. So he has a large chip on his shoulder, which gives him an attitude." Murray also noted that, unlike his character on One Tree Hill, Thompson does not serve as the "moral compass", which meant that he would not be "confined to a box" and would instead be allowed to "really play things up and do what's unexpected". For the second season, Thompson is made chief of the East Coast SSR office.
- Enver Gjokaj as Daniel Sousa:
  A war veteran who is an agent with the SSR and experiences prejudice due to his injured leg. "He accepts his injury, he accepts his compromised status in society ... Peggy says, 'Forget this. I'm Peggy Carter. I'm going to do something else.' I think that's the difference between the two of them." Considering a potentially romantic relationship between Sousa and Carter, Gjokaj said, "I think there's definitely a situation where...if she hadn't dated Captain America, he might ask her out for a drink. It's like if your new girlfriend dated Ryan Gosling. It's going to make you sweat a bit." For the second season, Sousa is made chief of the West Coast SSR office.
- Shea Whigham as Roger Dooley:
  The SSR chief who oversees Agents Carter, Thompson, and Sousa until he dies to save his fellow SSR agents at the end of season one. Whigham believes that, unlike many of the other agents, Dooley does respect Carter, saying, "I think he likes her. I think he cares deeply. I'm not sure that he can always show that ... these are things that keep him up at night, as well as the other boys, when I send them out on missions." The character was always intended to die during the first season's penultimate episode to help build stakes for the series given that "everyone knows Peggy lives", so from the beginning, Whigham was only hired for the seven required episodes.

== Episodes ==
| Season | Episodes | Originally released | |
| Season | Episodes | First released | Last released |
|---|---|---|---|
| 1 | 8 | January 6, 2015 | February 24, 2015 |
| 2 | 10 | January 19, 2016 | March 1, 2016 |

=== Season 1 (2015) ===
| No. overall | No. in season | Title | Directed by | Written by | Original release date | U.S. viewers (millions) |
|---|---|---|---|---|---|---|
| 1 | 1 | "Now is Not the End" | Louis D'Esposito | Christopher Markus & Stephen McFeely | January 6, 2015 | 6.91 |
| 2 | 2 | "Bridge and Tunnel" | Joseph V. Russo | Eric Pearson | January 6, 2015 | 6.91 |
| 3 | 3 | "Time and Tide" | Scott Winant | Andi Bushell | January 13, 2015 | 5.10 |
| 4 | 4 | "The Blitzkrieg Button" | Stephen Cragg | Brant Englestein | January 27, 2015 | 4.63 |
| 5 | 5 | "The Iron Ceiling" | Peter Leto | Jose Molina | February 3, 2015 | 4.20 |
| 6 | 6 | "A Sin to Err" | Stephen Williams | Lindsey Allen | February 10, 2015 | 4.25 |
| 7 | 7 | "Snafu" | Vincent Misiano | Chris Dingess | February 17, 2015 | 4.15 |
| 8 | 8 | "Valediction" | Christopher Misiano | Michele Fazekas & Tara Butters | February 24, 2015 | 4.02 |

=== Season 2 (2016) ===
| No. overall | No. in season | Title | Directed by | Written by | Original release date | U.S. viewers (millions) |
|---|---|---|---|---|---|---|
| 9 | 1 | "The Lady in the Lake" | Lawrence Trilling | Brant Englestein | January 19, 2016 | 3.18 |
| 10 | 2 | "A View in the Dark" | Lawrence Trilling | Eric Pearson & Lindsey Allen | January 19, 2016 | 3.18 |
| 11 | 3 | "Better Angels" | David Platt | Jose Molina | January 26, 2016 | 2.90 |
| 12 | 4 | "Smoke & Mirrors" | David Platt | Sue Chung | February 2, 2016 | 2.77 |
| 13 | 5 | "The Atomic Job" | Craig Zisk | Lindsey Allen | February 9, 2016 | 2.66 |
| 14 | 6 | "Life of the Party" | Craig Zisk | Eric Pearson | February 16, 2016 | 2.39 |
| 15 | 7 | "Monsters" | Metin Hüseyin | Brandon Easton | February 16, 2016 | 2.39 |
| 16 | 8 | "The Edge of Mystery" | Metin Hüseyin | Brant Englestein | February 23, 2016 | 2.50 |
| 17 | 9 | "A Little Song and Dance" | Jennifer Getzinger | Story by : Michele Fazekas & Tara Butters; Teleplay by : Chris Dingess | February 23, 2016 | 2.50 |
| 18 | 10 | "Hollywood Ending" | Jennifer Getzinger | Story by : Chris Dingess; Teleplay by : Michele Fazekas & Tara Butters | March 1, 2016 | 2.35 |

== Production ==
=== Development ===
A potential Agent Carter series was initially brought up in July 2013 by Louis D'Esposito, after a screening of his Agent Carter Marvel One-Shot at San Diego Comic-Con. By September, Marvel Television was developing a series inspired by the short film, featuring Peggy Carter, and was in search of a writer for the series. In January 2014, ABC Entertainment Group president Paul Lee confirmed that the show was in development, and revealed that Tara Butters and Michele Fazekas would act as the series' showrunners. Chris Dingess also serves as a showrunner. In March 2014, Christopher Markus & Stephen McFeely, writers of the Captain America films, stated that they envisioned the series, which had not yet been greenlit, as a limited series of approximately 13 episodes. By April 2014, there were indications that the series would be ordered straight to series, bypassing a pilot order, and would air between the late 2014 and early 2015 portions of Agents of S.H.I.E.L.D., if that series got a second season renewal. On May 8, 2014, ABC officially ordered the series for eight episodes, with executive producers Butters, Fazekas, Markus, McFeely, Dingess, Kevin Feige, Louis D'Esposito, Alan Fine, Joe Quesada, Stan Lee, and Jeph Loeb. The series was renewed for a second season on May 7, 2015, of 10 episodes.

=== Writing ===
It's a really rich period in history, where this giant opposition we had going for 10 years with the Nazis is gone, and we're not completely positive what the rules are anymore. Who gets the scientists? Who gets the secrets? It's all on the table. Everyone developed these skills in World War II. People became spies, people became murderers. And suddenly the war was over, and they came back, and it's like, 'Wow, I know how to do some shit. Now, what do I do with this?' It's nice to play with that assortment of characters. An office, basically full of people who just came back from the war. There's no telling what any of them experienced last year.

— Co-creator Christopher Markus on exploring the dynamic of 1940s characters.

Markus and McFeely stated in March 2014 that the series would be set in 1946 initially, occurring in the middle of the timeline established in the One-Shot, and would focus on one case for Carter. Additional seasons would then advance a year and examine a new case. Despite working on Captain America: Civil War at the same time, Markus and McFeely remained involved with the series after writing the first script. When the showrunners joined the series, they went on a "mini-camp" with Markus and McFeely to develop the series from a pilot script written by the pair. They looked to several different influences outside of Marvel in developing the series, including Raiders of the Lost Ark, L.A. Confidential, and the works of author James Ellroy. Elaborating on deviating from the comics, Fazekas said, for example, "if we're using a minor character or a bad guy from an old comic book, we don't have to adhere to what that character was in that comic book from 1945. Because there are so many different iterations of a specific character, you can't be true to every single one." ABC asked the producers to not have the series follow a "Gadget of the Week or Bad Guy of the Week" model, and instead focus on telling the story of Carter balancing her personal and professional lives. Fazekas called this "such a nice change" from previous television experience, with the group feeling free to drop whole story ideas in favor of focusing on the series' central storyline.

On the time periods the series could potentially explore following the first season given Carter's role in Captain America: The Winter Soldier, Atwell said, "I think the great thing about the fact that I've already played her at the end of her life means that we know ... [Now] we have an opportunity, if the show does go into second and third and fourth and fifth [seasons], we know that we can explore all of these aspects of her character because we know she lives such a long life and she's had a fulfilled life. I think what's going to start happening in Season 1 is seeds are going to be planted as to what happens in her personal life—and yet it's still open to the possibility of new men coming into her life, deepening relationships with the men that we discover in Season 1. Obviously, the era is 1946 but in the second, third, fourth, fifth season—if it goes onto that—we can explore different time periods. We can explore the late forties, the early fifties, the sixties, the seventies, the eighties, up until present day, so it's very exciting because of that." However, Butters clarified that future seasons would likely stay in the same time period, possibly changing location to a place like Hollywood or Europe, to remain in a pre-S.H.I.E.L.D. setting and avoid competing with Agents of S.H.I.E.L.D. This was the case with the second season, which moved the series to 1947 Los Angeles.

=== Casting ===
Atwell, who portrayed Carter in Captain America: The First Avenger, Captain America: The Winter Soldier, and the Agent Carter short film, expressed interest in returning as the character in October 2013, before Lee confirmed her involvement in January 2014. That August, Chad Michael Murray and Enver Gjokaj were cast as SSR agents Jack Thompson and Daniel Sousa, respectively, while James D'Arcy was cast the next month as Edwin Jarvis, the character who would eventually inspire the artificial intelligence J.A.R.V.I.S. from the MCU films. Shea Whigham was also cast, as SSR chief Roger Dooley. Atwell, D'Arcy, Gjokaj, and Murray returned for the second season.

=== Design ===
==== Costumes ====
The costume designer for the series was Giovanna Ottobre-Melton, who felt comfortable with the series' period setting after spending months researching American styles in the 1940s for the 2013 television series Mob City. She noted that "many comic books were all blended by the color, style, and fabrics" from 1940s New York. Due to the large amount of action in the series, fabrics "with the feel and texture of the 1940s" had to be sourced in large quantities, to allow for the creation of four, five, or more of each costume. Ottobre-Melton's process "for each episode, [is to] read the script first, and then search for historic photos that relate to what the episode is about. Afterwards I chose the fabrics, and then begin to design the outfits."

==== Props ====
When creating the gadgets for the series, the writers noted the need to combine the period setting with the influence of Howard Stark, who opens the door to "things that are fantastic for the time period". They worked closely with the props department to develop technology that appears "both retro and futuristic at the same time", with Fazekas explaining that the goal was to avoid a science fiction look, so the fantastical aspects were reserved solely for function while the aesthetic was kept within the realms of that time period.

=== Filming ===
Filming for the series took place in Los Angeles, with the story's location shifting from New York City to Los Angeles with the second season to capitalize on this. Gabriel Beristain, cinematographer for the One-Shot and the first season of the series, used a combination of modern digital technology and traditional analog techniques to replicate the feel of classic films that are set in the 1940s, but to also have the convenience and consistency of modern technology, such as using the Arri Alexa digital camera, along with Leica Camera lenses and silk-stocking diffusion nets. Edward J. Pei took over as cinematographer for the second season. Stunt coordinator Casey O'Neill, who also worked on the One-Shot and Captain America: The Winter Soldier, incorporated the specific fighting styles of the characters, such as the more "CIA-trained" fighting of Carter or the more acrobatic, "Black Widow"-inspired style of antagonist Dottie Underwood.

=== Visual effects ===
Sheena Duggal served as visual effect supervisor, returning in the same capacity from the Agent Carter One-Shot, with the visual effects for the series created by Industrial Light & Magic (ILM), Base FX, and later DNeg TV. Duggal worked closest with ILM, who coordinated with Base and DNeg to ensure a "seamless workflow". The majority of the series' visual effects work focuses on set extensions to depict the period setting, as well as the more fantastical aspects such as Howard Stark's inventions, or Zero Matter and Jason Wilkes' intangibility in the second season.

=== Music ===
In June 2014, Christopher Lennertz, who composed the music for the Agent Carter One-Shot, talked about potentially working on the series, saying, D'Esposito "told me last summer at Comic-Con that there was a possibility this was going to become a series. And he said that if he was going to be involved, he wanted me to be involved, too." In September 2014, Lennertz officially signed on to compose for the series. Lennertz combined all the different style elements of the show in the music, such as mixing jazz and period elements, with orchestra and electronic elements. Lennertz said, the music is "always done from a sense of being sort of in control and savvy and clever, rather than just being strong or just having a superpower or sort of being so much further along than anybody else physically. Part of it was just trying to make it that she's just smarter than everybody else. She's got such command over so many of these situations, and that was the most important thing was to give her that personality." A soundtrack album for the first season was released on iTunes on December 11, 2015, and the single "Whatcha Gonna Do (It's Up to You)" from the second season was released on March 18, 2016.

=== Marvel Cinematic Universe tie-ins ===
We work really closely with Eric Carroll in Marvel Studios. He's sort of the guy who tells us, "Well, you can't really do this to that thing, because that's going to step on this project. But what if you do this?" They're really generous with that world.

— Fazekas on working in with MCU canon

Because Carter originated from the films, Fazekas said Marvel Studios co-presidents Feige and D'Esposito were very invested in the production of the series and called them "really collaborative and very generous with their world". Markus, talking about the series' place in the greater architecture of the MCU, later said, "you really only need to drop the tiniest bit of hint and its connected. You don't have to go, 'Howard Stark's wearing the same pants that Tony wears!' ... Everything is enhanced just by the knowledge that its all connected." Butters said, "We always want to feel like you see us as a piece of [the MCU]. But because of our time period, we kind of are on our own a little bit."

In July 2014, Fazekas explained the series' relationship with the One-Shot by saying, "The short really is the basis for the series. [Carter]'s working at SSR, post-war...If you think of the short as sort of the end of the series, the series would be leading up to that moment where she gets assigned to S.H.I.E.L.D." Markus reiterated this in January 2015, but acknowledged that it would be harder to keep continuity with the short the longer they made the series. The first season introduces the origins of the Black Widow and Winter Soldier programs, which both appear in several MCU films, while the second season shows the discovery of the Darkforce (known as Zero Matter in the series), which previously appeared in Agents of S.H.I.E.L.D. and has ties to the Marvel characters Doctor Strange and Cloak.

== Release ==
=== Broadcast ===
Agent Carter aired on ABC in the United States, in 720p high definition and 5.1 surround sound. It also aired on CTV in Canada, and TV2 in New Zealand. In October 2014, Channel 4, the channel that airs Agents of S.H.I.E.L.D. in the United Kingdom, stated that they did not "have any current plans [to air] Agent Carter". In June 2015, FOX UK purchased the broadcast rights for the United Kingdom, with the series premiering on July 12, 2015. In February 2016, the series was announced to air on 7flix in Australia.

=== Home media and streaming ===
| Season | DVD and Blu-ray release dates | | |
| Season | Region 1 | Region 2 | Region 4 |
|---|---|---|---|
| 1 | September 18, 2015 | November 30, 2015 | December 7, 2016 |
| 2 | TBA | December 5, 2016 | March 1, 2017 |

The complete first season became available on Blu-ray and DVD on September 18, 2015, as an Amazon exclusive. On November 29, 2017, Hulu acquired the exclusive streaming rights to the series. Both seasons of Agent Carter were made available on Disney+ at launch, on November 12, 2019.

== Reception ==
=== Ratings ===
Viewership and ratings per season of Agent Carter
| Season | Timeslot (ET) | Episodes | First aired | | Last aired | | TV season | Viewership rank | Avg. viewers (millions) | 18–49 rank | Avg. 18–49 rating |
| Season | Timeslot (ET) | Episodes | Date | Viewers (millions) | Date | Viewers (millions) | TV season | Viewership rank | Avg. viewers (millions) | 18–49 rank | Avg. 18–49 rating |
|---|---|---|---|---|---|---|---|---|---|---|---|
| 1 | Tuesday 9:00 pm | 8 | January 6, 2015 | 6.91 | February 24, 2015 | 4.02 | 2014–15 | 74 | 7.14 | 46 | 2.3 |
| 2 | Tuesday 9:00 pm | 10 | January 19, 2016 | 3.18 | March 1, 2016 | 2.35 | 2015–16 | 109 | 4.37 | 88 | 1.4 |

Maureen Ryan of Variety blamed both seasons' low viewership on "the questionable scheduling decisions" made by then ABC president Paul Lee, saying that the series "has received lackluster promotion, especially [for its second season]. The botched rollout of season two included a changed premiere date and episodes that were difficult to access in advance on Marvel's dreadful media site. Capping the mishandling is the fact that the full first season was only made available on ABC.com days before season two began, which frustrated viewers who might have wanted to jump on board in advance."

=== Critical response ===
Critical response of Agent Carter
| Season | Rotten Tomatoes | Metacritic |
|---|---|---|
| 1 | 98% (48 reviews) | 72 (27 reviews) |
| 2 | 76% (21 reviews) | —N/a |

The review aggregator website Rotten Tomatoes reported a 98% approval rating with an average rating of 7.9/10 based on 48 reviews for the first season. The website's consensus reads, "Focusing on Peggy Carter as a person first and an action hero second makes Marvel's Agent Carter a winning, stylish drama with bursts of excitement and an undercurrent of cheeky fun". The second season scored a 76% approval rating with an average score of 8/10 based on 21 reviews. The website's consensus reads, "A move from New York to Hollywood gives Agent Carter new territory to explore, as the series continues to search for a storyline as dynamic as its heroine". Metacritic, which uses a weighted average, assigned a score of 72 out of 100 based on 27 reviews, indicating "generally favorable reviews" for the series overall.

=== Accolades ===
Accolades received by Agent Carter
| Award | Year | Category | Recipient(s) | Result | Ref. |
|---|---|---|---|---|---|
| Hollywood Post Alliance Awards | 2015 | Outstanding Visual Effects – Television (Under 13 Episodes) | Sheena Duggal, Richard Bluff, Jay Mehta, Chad Taylor, and Cody Gramstad for "Now is Not the End" | Nominated | |
| Make-Up Artists and Hair Stylists Guild Awards | 2016 | Television and New Media Series – Best Period and/or Character Hair Styling | Agent Carter | Nominated | |
| Saturn Awards | 2015 | Best Superhero Adaptation Television Series | Agent Carter | Nominated | |
| Saturn Awards | 2015 | Best Actress in a Television Series | Hayley Atwell | Nominated | |
| Saturn Awards | 2015 | Best Guest Performance in a Television Series | Dominic Cooper | Nominated | |
| Saturn Awards | 2016 | Best Superhero Adaptation Television Series | Agent Carter | Nominated | |
| Visual Effects Society Awards | 2016 | Outstanding Supporting Visual Effects in a Photoreal Episode | "Now is Not the End" | Nominated | |

== Cancellation ==
Arguing for the renewal of the series for a third season following its low viewership, Ryan said that "letting the show die would be a serious mistake, for the network and for the bigger Disney-ABC conglomerate...These days, entertainment properties have to be viewed not just through the lens of their ratings (admittedly weak for Agent Carter). They have to be evaluated within the context of the overall value they bring to any entertainment colossus, and what Agent Carter adds to Disney-ABC is simply too valuable to give up ... [bringing] something different to the company's superhero portfolio." She suggested if ABC did not renew the series for broadcast, that it should explore other opportunities, such as debuting on its online Watch ABC app, or being sold to Netflix, where "fans of super-heroic storytelling already flock to" and Agent Carter's "status as a period piece—which may have harmed it on broadcast—could be a real draw for Netflix viewers". Ryan also felt Marvel "could copy what CBS is doing with Star Trek" by creating a subscription service for a monthly fee, where consumers could access Marvel's films and televisions shows "as well as premium exclusives like a third season of Agent Carter". Ryan concluded, "A third Agent Carter season could help solidify Marvel's standing not just with female fans, but with everyone who appreciates excellent and adventurous storytelling."

In March 2016, Fazekas said the producers felt "bad" about the chances for a third season due to the series' low viewership, adding she "would love to see it live on, even if it's in some other form, digital or whatever. I doubt that there's a Netflix play for it." She also added that ABC wanted some sort of conclusion to the series, and so the writers and producers would find a way to conclude the lingering plot threads in some form if the series was not renewed. On May 12, 2016, ABC canceled the series.

Loeb stated in August 2016 that he did not understand the cancellation, as "there were no conversations" regarding the series' future between ABC and Marvel, with the latter simply receiving a call from ABC saying Agent Carter was canceled. He added that since the networks decide what content they would like from Marvel Television, "if someone wants to call and say, 'We want a two-hour Agent Carter [film special] for May 2017,' boom. We'll put together the greatest Agent Carter movie we can." Atwell added that she was also not part of the conversation to cancel the series and called it "a network political thing" since ABC wanted her to headline the more "mainstream" drama Conviction "to get their ratings up" instead of staying on Agent Carter, which Atwell felt had gained a "cult following". After speculation regarding a revival for the series by Netflix, chief content officer Ted Sarandos stated the streaming service passed on reviving Agent Carter because it is "looking for truly original brands to own and in that Marvel space we already have" original Marvel series. He also added that due to existing international broadcasting "deal complexities" for the series, Netflix would not have been able to air Agent Carter globally, as "some of those output partners still had it on the air, so they would argue its covered by their output [deals]. Unfortunately, it was a business decision more than a creative one."

When the series was canceled shortly after the release of Captain America: Civil War, in which Carter dies, Meagan Damore of Comic Book Resources felt that "for all intents and purposes" Carter had "effectively been phased out of the Marvel Cinematic Universe", and the universe had subsequently lost "a wonderful role model and...inspiration" to fans of the character and series. Damore lamented the fact that the second season's cliffhanger ending had been left unresolved, and that viewers would never get the chance to see Carter's "happy ending", despite knowing she gets one, leaving the character's "fate unfulfilled, languishing in the obscurity of 'what could have beens'". She also noted that Marvel had now lost "the opportunity to show several prominent MCU events, not the least of which is the founding of S.H.I.E.L.D.", and added that despite making "leaps and bounds for women in the MCU, the same [could not] be said for people of color", wishing the series had addressed Asian American women like Hazel Ying Lee, one of 38 Women Airforce Service Pilots who died in the line of duty, or Black women like Harriet Ida Pickens and Frances Wills, the first two Black members of the United States Naval Reserve.

== Future ==
=== Suggested spin-off podcast ===
In March 2015, Butters revealed that there had been discussions with Thrilling Adventure Hour co-creator Ben Blacker about turning the fictional Captain America Adventure Program radio show from the first season into a real podcast. Butters said these well-received segments had not been part of their original pitch to Marvel, and that a second season renewal for the series would help the podcast's chances. She said the potential episodes would be "little fifteen-minute storylines".

=== Planned third season ===
Before the cancellation, Atwell said on the series' future, "We think that there could be more to come....the [second season] finale doesn't suggest that that's it and they live happily ever after; that's the end. We know that's not the case. They've done it in a very clever way which wraps up and that gives the audience a very satisfying conclusion but they're not quite finishing it". Fazekas explained that an early idea from Markus and McFeely was to set the third season in London, but "you can put the show anywhere, because it's spies. [The location is] all going to be determined by what story we want to tell. I loved [Los Angeles]. I loved how it looked, I loved how it looked on Peggy. We would be very happy to do another L.A. season, but we're not married to it." Fazekas added that seeds for a third season had been planted throughout the second, and that the end of the second season—with someone shooting Thompson and taking the M. Carter file—was "very much tied to a third season arc", with the shooter and their reasoning already determined. Atwell said the third season would have gone "further back into [Carter's] past" while having "a possible kind of twist... into something to do with [her] family". She also added that more insight would have been provided on Carter's brother, Michael. Writer Jose Molina expanded on this in July 2018, stating that the season would have focused on the investigation of the assassination attempt on Thompson, along with the revelation that Michael was still alive and involved in some "very nefarious, super-villainous shenanigans".

=== Feature films and other television series ===
D'Arcy first reprised his role as Jarvis for Marvel Studios in their MCU film Avengers: Endgame (2019), marking the first time a character introduced in an MCU television series appears in an MCU film. Additionally, Gjokaj reprises his role as Sousa in the seventh season of Agents of S.H.I.E.L.D. The episode "Alien Commies from the Future!" is set in 1955, eight years after the events of Agent Carter season two, and sees Sousa as the head of the S.H.I.E.L.D.-run Area 51 base. In "Out of the Past", the S.H.I.E.L.D. team fakes Sousa's death, allowing him to join the team as they travel to future time periods.

=== Potential revival ===
While promoting Endgame, Markus and McFeely were asked about the potential for Agent Carter to be revived by Disney's new streaming service Disney+. McFeely acknowledged that the series' fanbase was "really dedicated" but was unsure if there was enough support to justify the cost of making the series and its period setting.
