= Peggy Carter (Marvel Cinematic Universe) =

Character in the Marvel Cinematic Universe

- Marvel Cinematic Universe character
- Hayley Atwell as Peggy Carter in Captain America: The First Avenger
- First appearance: Captain America: The First Avenger; (2011)
- Based on: Peggy Carter by: Stan Lee; Jack Kirby
- Adapted by: Christopher Markus; Stephen McFeely
- Portrayed by: Hayley Atwell; Gabriella Graves (young)

In-universe information
- Full name: Margaret Elizabeth Carter
- Nickname: Peggy
- Species: Human
- Title: Agent Carter
- Occupation: Special agent; Director of S.H.I.E.L.D.
- Affiliation: S.H.I.E.L.D.; Strategic Scientific Reserve; MI6
- Family: Harrison Carter (Father); Amanda Carter (mother); Michael Carter (brother)
- Spouse: Steve Rogers (Note: In an alternate reality through time travel, that becomes the past in the main timeline.)
- Significant others: Fred Wells (ex-fiancé); Daniel Sousa (ex-boyfriend)
- Relatives: Sharon Carter (niece)
- Nationality: British

Margaret Elizabeth "Peggy" Carter, also known as Agent Carter, is a fictional character in the Marvel Cinematic Universe (MCU) media franchise portrayed by Hayley Atwell, based on the Marvel Comics character of the same name. Carter is depicted as a British MI6 agent and member of the Strategic Scientific Reserve who became Steve Rogers's love interest during World War II. Following the war, she became one of the founders of S.H.I.E.L.D., eventually serving as the Director. Atwell has received critical praise for her depiction of the character.

As of 2024, the character has appeared in five films, as well as the short film Agent Carter (2013), the second season of Agents of S.H.I.E.L.D., and her own television series Agent Carter (2015–2016).

Alternate versions of the character, including Captain Carter, appear in the animated series What If...? (2021–2024) and the film Doctor Strange in the Multiverse of Madness (2022). What If...?'s Carter receives the Super Soldier Serum instead of Rogers. She is recruited by The Watcher to join the Guardians of the Multiverse. Multiverse of Madness's Captain Carter, also a supersoldier, is a member of the Illuminati from a reality called Earth-838.

== Concept and creation ==
Peggy Carter debuted in a single panel (at the time the character was unnamed) as a wartime love interest of Captain America in Tales of Suspense #75 (March 1966), and then being named in #77 (May 1966). She was created by writer Stan Lee and artist Jack Kirby.

Hayley Atwell was cast in the role of Peggy Carter for Captain America: The First Avenger in April 2010. Atwell expressed interest in reprising the role for Agent Carter in October 2013; ABC Entertainment president Paul Lee confirmed her involvement in the project in January 2014.

Regarding her preparation for the role, Atwell said, "I'm training at the moment six days a week to make her a bit more military and make it convincing that I could kick butt." On taking up the role of Carter, Atwell said "the main reason I did Captain America was because I wanted to get out of my own head and stop taking my work so seriously". Captain America: The First Avenger screenwriter Christopher Markus said the film "takes place in the 40s, there weren't too many women in areas of authority at that point, and we wanted her to essentially be the most capable person on the screen at that time".

== Appearances ==
Hayley Atwell portrays Peggy Carter in the Marvel Cinematic Universe films Captain America: The First Avenger (2011), Agent Carter (2013), Captain America: The Winter Soldier (2014), Avengers: Age of Ultron (2015), Ant-Man (2015), Avengers: Endgame Atwell appears in images in Captain America: Civil War (2016).

Atwell also appears in the television series Agents of S.H.I.E.L.D.'s episodes "Shadows" (2014) and "The Things We Bury" (2014), and in the television series Agent Carter (2015–2016).

Gabriella Graves portrays a young Carter in the Agent Carter episode "Smoke & Mirrors".

Atwell voices an alternate version in the What If...? season 2 episode "What If... Peter Quill Attacked Earth's Mightiest Heroes?". In an alternate 1988, she is responsible for bringing together the Avengers to face Peter Quill and Ego.

== Fictional character biography ==
=== Early life ===
Margaret Elizabeth Carter was born in Hampstead, England, on April 9, 1919, to her parents Harrison and Amanda Carter. After the death of her brother Michael fighting in World War II, Carter decided to leave her then-fiancé Fred Wells and joined British Intelligence, and assigned as a code breaker in Bletchley Park. Rising quickly through the ranks, she was reassigned as a British Liaison to the American Forces fighting the Nazis, becoming a key member of the Strategic Scientific Reserve (SSR) under the command of Colonel Chester Phillips. (Note: As seen in the Agents of S.H.I.E.L.D. episode "Emancipation" (01:07), in the newspaper article that Phil Coulson is reading.)

=== Project Rebirth ===
In 1943, Carter is tasked by the SSR to help oversee Project Rebirth, a program led by Howard Stark and Dr. Abraham Erskine to create an army of supersoldiers for the United States war effort. After a series of tests on different soldiers, the sickly Steve Rogers is chosen as their first test subject, due to his cunning and heroic character.

Carter escorts Rogers to a secret underground lab in Brooklyn, where Erskine injects Rogers with his Super Soldier Serum and doses him with vita-rays. Rogers emerges from the experiment as a super soldier, but an undercover Hydra agent, Heinz Kruger, kills Erskine and flees with the last vial of serum. Rogers and Carter pursue Kruger; Carter nearly kills him, but Rogers saves her from being hit by his vehicle. After the vial is destroyed and Kruger commits suicide upon capture, Carter and Rogers part ways when he is assigned to a research lab so that he could be studied, only for Rogers to be reassigned as a costumed mascot named "Captain America" to sell war bonds.

==== Helping Steve Rogers ====
Carter and Rogers reunite in Italy during his USO tour. After Rogers' best friend Bucky Barnes is captured by Hydra, Rogers has Carter and Howard Stark fly him behind enemy lines to mount a solo rescue attempt for Barnes and hundreds of other POWs, which succeeds. Returning to SSR Headquarters in London, England, Carter and Rogers develop feelings for each other, but Carter catches him being kissed by another woman, prompting her to become jealous and angrily fire bullets at Rogers' new shield when he shows it to her.

Carter, Rogers and his Howling Commandos continue to work together on numerous missions to defeat Hydra. When Barnes falls to his death while capturing Arnim Zola, Carter comforts Rogers. Zola's interrogation reveals the final Hydra stronghold, where Rogers leads an attack to stop Johann Schmidt from using weapons of mass destruction on America's cities. Rogers and Carter kiss before he climbs aboard Schmidt's aircraft as it takes off.

Carter later receives a radio transmission from Rogers, who reports Schmidt's death and that the plane is too damaged to land without the risk of detonating its weapons. The pair say their goodbyes, promising to dance with each other, before Rogers crashes the aircraft into the Arctic. With Rogers and the wreck unable to be recovered, Rogers is presumed dead, and Carter keeps an old photo of Rogers before his transformation as a loving keepsake.

=== Post–World War II ===
In 1945, Carter and the SSR raid the last known Hydra base led by Werner Reinhardt. They confiscate many items including the Obelisk and a blue body.

One year later, Carter faces sexism from her boss, Agent John Flynn, who treats her condescendingly and keeps her compiling data and code breaking while assigning field cases to the male agents. The SSR's main concern is the mysterious Zodiac, which they have been unable to recover for some time. One night alone in the office while the men are out together, Carter answers the case line to hear of the location of the Zodiac. Though three to five agents are recommended, Carter decides to go to the location herself. Fighting off multiple guards, Carter is able to retrieve the Zodiac, a mysterious serum, herself. The next day, Flynn reprimands her for not going through the proper procedures to complete the mission, and dismisses the indignant Carter as just an "old flame" of Captain America's who was given her current job out of pity for her bereavement. However, before he can officially punish her, the case line rings again, this time with Howard Stark on the other end, who informs Flynn that Carter will co-head the newly created S.H.I.E.L.D.

Later, Carter has to balance the routine office work she does for the SSR in New York City with secretly assisting Howard Stark, who finds himself framed for supplying deadly weapons to enemies of the United States. Carter is assisted by Stark's butler, Edwin Jarvis, to find those responsible and dispose of the weapons.

In 1947, Carter moves from New York City to Los Angeles to deal with the threats of the new Atomic Age by the Council of Nine in the aftermath of World War II, gaining new friends, a new home, and starting a romance with Daniel Sousa.

=== Director of S.H.I.E.L.D. and later life ===
Sometime later, Carter marries a man whom Steve Rogers saved from a Hydra base in World War II, and has two children with him. Carter's American niece Sharon Carter later becomes a S.H.I.E.L.D. agent. Meanwhile, Peggy Carter also conducts S.H.I.E.L.D. operations in collaboration with a man named "Braddock". (Note: Noted in media as a possible reference to Brian Braddock.)

By 1970, Carter serves as the Director of S.H.I.E.L.D. (Note: As depicted in Avengers: Endgame (2019).) In 1989, Carter witnesses a confrontation between Hank Pym and Howard Stark over Stark's use of Pym Particles without Pym's knowledge, causing Pym to quit S.H.I.E.L.D. (Note: As depicted in a flashback in Ant-Man (film) (2015).)

In 2014, Carter, who is now elderly, has developed Alzheimer's disease, and is living in a retirement home in Washington D.C.. Rogers visits her, having come out of suspended animation a few years prior. Carter notes to Rogers that the world has changed and is surprised to see him.

In 2016, Carter passes away in her sleep, and Sharon, Rogers, and Sam Wilson attend her funeral. (Note: As depicted in Captain America: Civil War (2016).)

== Alternate versions ==
=== Working at S.H.I.E.L.D. ===
In an alternate identical-history 1970s, Director Carter is observed working at S.H.I.E.L.D.'s base at Camp Lehigh, New Jersey by a time-travelling Steve Rogers.

=== Reunited with Steve Rogers ===
In an alternate identical-history 1949, Carter was met by Earth 616-Steve Rogers. They got married and lived a happy life together. This claim was supported by directors Joe and Anthony Russo but has been contested by writers Christopher Markus and Stephen McFeely, who claim that Steve managed to break the film's time travel rules and live on Earth-616 with Peggy, possibly even being present at her funeral alongside his younger self.

=== 1988 Avengers vs. Ego ===
In an alternate 1988, Carter, now-Director of S.H.I.E.L.D., together with Howard Stark, assembles a team composed of Bill Foster / Goliath, King T'Chaka of Wakanda, Wendy Lawson / Mar-Vell, Bucky Barnes / Winter Soldier and Hank Pym / Ant-Man to stop a young Peter Quill who returned to Earth after being reunited with his father, Ego. Carter and Stark aid the team in capturing Quill before Pym's daughter, Hope van Dyne, frees Quill. Carter later leads the attack on Ego and witness the defeat of his physical form at Quill's hands. Afterwards, Carter attends a victory party at Pym's house and joins the rest of the team in going after Ego's planetary form.

=== Captain Carter ===
Atwell portrays Captain Carter in the Disney+ animated series What If...? in an alternate universe. In this timeline, she receives the Super Soldier Serum and becomes a superhero named Captain Carter. In the episode "What If... the Watcher Broke His Oath?", she is recruited by the Watcher to join the Guardians of the Multiverse to stop an alternate Ultron. She returns in the season 2 episodes "What If... Captain Carter Fought the Hydra Stomper?", "What If... the Avengers Assembled in 1602?", "What If... Strange Supreme Intervened?", and the season 3 episodes "What If... The Watcher Disappeared?" and "What If... What If?".

Another version of Captain Carter appears in Doctor Strange in the Multiverse of Madness. In Earth-838, Carter serves as a member of the Illuminati and is killed when Wanda Maximoff throws Carter's shield at her, cutting her in half.

==== What If...? ====
===== Becoming a Super Soldier =====
In an alternate 1943, when Carter chooses to stay in the main theater instead of watching from a safe distance, which leads other men present for observation doing the same. As a result, Kruger attacks Project Rebirth before it starts and shoots Rogers, leading Carter to take the Super Soldier Serum herself. Carter, after attacking a Hydra convoy and successfully retrieving the Tesseract from Hydra leader Johann Schmidt, becomes the superhero Captain Carter, equipped with a vibranium shield that has a Union Jack style paint job. Rogers instead pilots the Hydra Stomper armor made by Howard Stark and powered by the Tesseract. Carter fights alongside Rogers to help the Allied Forces win World War II. In 1945, Rogers goes missing during an attack on a Hydra train, prompting Carter to interrogate Arnim Zola to learn the location of Schmidt's castle. They find him using the Tesseract to summon an interdimensional creature from a portal which kills him. Carter sacrifices herself by entering the portal while pushing the creature back into it.

Carter lands in S.H.I.E.L.D.'s warehouse, meeting Nick Fury and Clint Barton, who tell her the war ended almost 70 years ago. In 2012, Carter becomes a member of the Avengers, consisting of Barton, Natasha Romanoff, Thor, Tony Stark, and Hope van Dyne, and fights in the Battle of New York.

===== Joining the Guardians of the Multiverse =====
By 2014, Carter, who works for S.H.I.E.L.D., goes on a mission with Romanoff to rescue the hijacked S.H.I.E.L.D. vessel Lemurian Star from Georges Batroc. While she duels Batroc, she is recruited by the Watcher to form the Guardians of the Multiverse to defeat Ultron, who plans to take control and destroy the entire multiverse. She and the Guardians meet Stephen Strange in a pub-like setting before being sent out to stop Ultron. The Guardians and an apocalyptic version of Romanoff fight Ultron in his and Romanoff's home universe, and Carter exposes Ultron's eye by removing part of his helmet. This allows Romanoff to inject an Arnim Zola virus, wiping out Ultron's consciousness, destroying him. Carter is then returned to her universe by the Watcher although she briefly hesitates while staring at a picture of her Steve Rogers.

===== Facing the Hydra Stomper =====
Back in her universe, Carter and Romanoff subdue Batroc, and then Romanoff informs her that the Hydra Stomper has been found with someone inside. This proves to be a still alive and barely aged Steve Rogers who was believed to have perished fighting Hydra in 1953. However, Rogers attacks the two women and escapes. Fury and Romanoff admit that there have been rumors of the Hydra Stomper still being around since the 1960s, but as the world's most deadly killer and a terrorist, Rogers having been captured and brainwashed by the Red Room. Carter and Romanoff thwart an assassination attempt by Rogers on Barnes in Washington, D.C.. They take Rogers to a hideout in Scotland where they discover that biotech in the Hydra Stomper has kept Rogers from aging, but it's also the only thing keeping him alive, meaning that they can't remove the suit without killing him. Awakening seemingly free of his brainwashing, Rogers leads the two women to a test site in Sokovia used the Red Room and reconnects with Carter. However, the Red Room attacks and reactivates Rogers' brainwashing, revealing that his true mission had always been to capture Carter. During the battle that follows, Carter manages to help Rogers break through the brainwashing and he seemingly sacrifices himself to destroy the Red Room.

Sometime later, Carter leaves Avengers Tower and is met by Romanoff in the garage. She states her desire to find Rogers who she is convinced is still alive. Before she can leave, Carter is pulled from a chaos magic portal into another universe. She is then met by Fury and Scarlet Witch who state that she is the person who can save their queen and their world. Carter begins calling for the Watcher.

===== Stranded on Earth-1602 =====
Stranded on Earth-1602, in the year 1602, Carter agrees to help Fury and the Scarlet Witch upon learning about an impending incursion. Sometime later, as a tear opens up, she arrives at the courtyard and saves Loki from being pulled into it. However, she is unable to save Queen Hela and under the new King Thor's orders is hunted down by Happy Hogan and the Royal Yellowjackets. Carter hides out and hears the Watcher narrating. She speaks to him and he tells her she does not belong in that universe. Carter tells him she wants to be there to help them, and locates Stark. She seeks his help in retrieving Thor's scepter and he tells her about people who can help steal it. She stumbles upon Loki's carriage and finds Scott Lang, Barnes, and Rogers there. She is overjoyed to meet a new Rogers and joins them at a pub, but it gets attacked by Hogan, the Yellowjackets and the Destroyer, who Carter fights off. She willingly gets taken into custody and speaks again with the Watcher, before freeing herself and frees Bruce Banner, bringing out the Hulk. They meet with Stark who reveals his device and are met by Rogers, Lang, and Barnes. The group disguise themselves and enter Thor's courtroom and wait for the Hulk's signal. After he arrives, Carter confronts Thor over the Scepter and he engages in a fight with her. Once the Scarlet Witch intervenes, Carter takes the Scepter and uses the Time Stone inside on Stark's device, exposing the time-displaced person to be Rogers. She is forced to say goodbye to him and sends him back to his universe, which ends the impending incursion and returns everyone else too to their universes.

However, Carter remains left behind in the universe and returns to the pub alone, but is met suddenly by Strange.

===== Facing Strange Supreme =====
Using his magic to provide shot glasses for them, Strange then takes her to his dimension, Sanctum Infinitum. He shows her the captured "universe-killers" and asks her to help him catch one that got away. He sends her to a universe where HYDRA had won and destroyed everything. The Watcher arrives and asks her what she is doing there. After he leaves, Carter is attacked by Kahhori, before the two make conversation and Carter learns that Strange lied to her. The two are then pulled through a portal back to the Sanctum and Carter learns he wants to resurrect his destroyed universe. In an effort to stall him, Carter releases all of Strange's prisoners and escapes with Kahhori. They run into a zombified Wanda Maximoff and other zombies, before another Hela, Fenris, and Surtur arrive. As they escape through the Sanctum, they are confronted by Thanos, but he gets snapped away by Erik Stevens. Stevens prepares to attack them, but Kahhori removes the Infinity Stone cladded armor from him and Carter puts the Stones on her armor. They reach the Forge and engage in a battle against Strange, which Carter tries reason with him but he said that his grief is too great. When he brings the captives to the Forge, Carter and Kahhori work together to save them, as Hela, Xu Wenwu, another Hulk, and another Thor throw their weapons to them. Carter fights off Strange, which, thanks to her compassion, he's been able resist to his grief, allowing to spare Carter, as he falls into the Forge and is rescued by the Watcher.

She is taken to the Nexus of All Realities and then to Strange's restored universe where they see Christine Palmer alive. Carter tells the Watcher she wants to see the Multiverse before going home and he takes her to the end of time to see Loki and assembly of the Multiversal Tree, that resembles Yggdrasil.

===== New Team and Sacrifice =====
Sometime later, Carter restarted the Guardians of the Multiverse and recruited Kahhori. She also met Storm and Byrdie the Duck and recruited them to the team. At some point, they were taken in by the Time Variance Authority. However, they escaped, stealing TVA reset charges and Kang the Conqueror's Time Sphere. Together they tracked the Champion of Hydra down in another universe attacking Xandar and arrived to help Nebula, Groot and Korg. Carter killed the creature and was thanked by Nebula before three Observational Plane shards fell from the sky. Carter realized that the Watcher must be in trouble and left with her team to investigate on their ship. Upon Kahhori's suggestion to recruit another Ultron, Carter went to another destroyed universe and asked Ultron for his help, but was captured by Eminence.

Carter was held prisoner by Eminence and the other Watchers in the Fifth Dimension. Before she was killed, Ultron broke into the Dimension and freed her and Uatu. Their ship crashed through picking up Carter and the Watcher, although Ultron stayed behind to buy them time. As they traveled out of the Dimension, Carter came up with the idea of leading the Watchers to Strange Supreme's new universe where Strange's soul was in every atom of the universe, hoping that their old friend could help them once again. However, they were attacked by the Watchers before they could reach it and crashed onto a planet. The Watcher gave Carter and the others the power of Watchers to fight, with the team getting the upper hand until Uatu told them to wait. He tried to reason with the Watchers but they instead tried to erase every variant of the team from existence. Carter sacrificed herself to save her friends, attacking Eminence to stop the attack and transporting everyone to Strange's universe.

Carter's sacrifice paid off as the Watchers were powerless in Strange's universe. Later, Carter's friends commemorated her actions by sending her shield flying through the Observational Plane. The Watcher suggested that Carter was still watching over them in some form, for the first time able to sense that he was being watched by something.

==== Earth-838 ====
In an alternate 2021, in a universe designated Earth-838, Captain Carter is a member of the Illuminati. When Thanos instigates the Infinity War, she and the Illuminati successfully defeat him using the Book of Vishanti. She is also present at the execution of 838-Stephen Strange, who became corrupted by the Darkhold. Carter and her fellow Illuminati debate what to do with Earth 616-Strange and America Chavez when they arrive on Earth-838. When their headquarters are attacked by 616-Wanda Maximoff, who has possessed the body of her 838-counterpart, Carter is killed when she is bisected by her own shield.

==== Other versions ====
In other universes, Carter has donned several mantles and identifies, including an Asgardian warrior, Sabretooth, Black Knight, Elektra, and Deathlok.

== Characterization ==
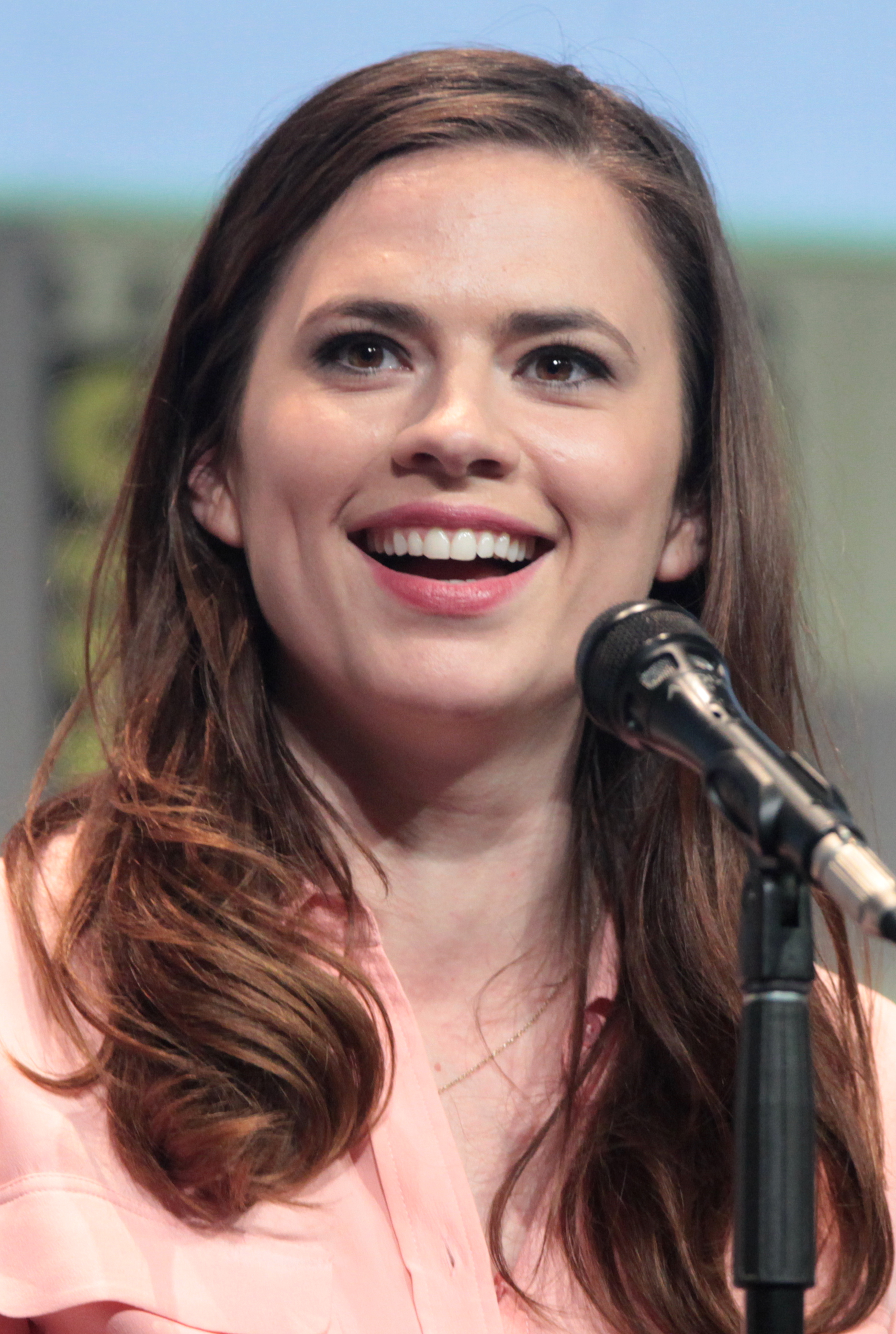
Hayley Atwell at San Diego Comic-Con in 2015

About the character's debut in Captain America: The First Avenger, Atwell stated, "I likened her character to that famous Ginger Rogers quote. She can do everything Captain America can do, but backwards and in high heels. She's an English soldier through and through, although she always looks fabulous. She might stand there with a machine-gun shooting Nazis, but she's obviously gone to the loo beforehand and applied a bit of lipstick. She doesn't need to be rescued. That's exciting to me – her strength." She added, "I think she's quite stubborn, a slightly frustrated woman who struggles with being a woman in that time. But more importantly she's a modern woman and she sees something in Captain America that she relates to, and becomes kindred spirits. He treats her very differently to how she's been treated by lots of men, in this kind of dominated world she lives in. So she's very much a fighter."

Carter is the first female character to headline a standalone story as part of the MCU, ahead of popular comic characters such as Black Widow and Captain Marvel. Unlike other major Marvel heroes, Carter does not have any superpowers, instead the writers "always said her superpower is the fact that other people underestimate her. And she often uses that to her advantage". Atwell said it was "thrilling" to explore "the backdrop of this male-dominated world, where women are still in the workforce, unspoken for and struggling to find a place outside the home" and how it affects Carter, who must deal with this along with the missions she receives.

On the character starring in her own short film, the director of the Agent Carter short film Louis D'Esposito said that Marvel always wanted to do a Peggy Carter short since the character "was a fan-favorite and a Marvel Studios favorite". D'Esposito enjoyed the moment when Carter uses her compact to view the bad guy, which was ad libbed during filming, because "that's the essence of what she's about and what the film's about. Not only is she—especially in that time—a woman in a man's world, she still maintains her femininity".

Speaking about the influence that the apparent death of Steve Rogers has on Carter, Atwell explained that "It's only been a year and she's grieving him and I think what keeps her going is he was the greatest person she ever knew ... she's also determined to make sure that his work wasn't in vain." Following the first season, Atwell noted that Carter did not "win everyone's respect", with Jack Thompson taking credit for her actions, for example, but "she knows her value so she doesn't need that praise". For the second season, executive producer Michele Fazekas explained that after Carter "put a lot of things emotionally to bed", such as letting go of Captain America, she is now "more open to looking at her life and figuring out, does she want a relationship?" Fazekas added that Carter would start to realize that "not everybody has her ideals", even in the SSR.

=== Appearance ===
Hayley Atwell before and after being digitally aged as Peggy Carter in Captain America: The Winter Soldier.

For Carter's costumes, though some vintage pieces were used, most of her outfits were custom made to accommodate the scripted action scenes. Costume designer Giovanna Ottobre-Melton gave the outfits an "hourglass style with strength in the tailoring and defined shoulders, but not overly exaggerated." For the character's tactical gear, World War II underground military looks were referenced. On receiving the script for Captain America: The Winter Soldier, Atwell realized the character "would be 96, and I would be up to the eyeballs in prosthetics." The visual effects team was not satisfied with the initial make-up used to make Atwell look older, and eventually resorted to aging her through CGI methods.

== Reception ==
=== Critical response ===
Reviewing Captain America: The First Avenger, Christy Lemire of the Associated Press said, "Atwell's gorgeous looks make her a great fit for the part, but her character is better developed than you might imagine; she's no damsel in distress, waiting for Captain America to save her, but rather a trained fighter who is very much his equal." Roger Ebert of the Chicago Sun-Times felt that she resembled "a classic military pin-up of the period" with her depicted "full red lips" of the film.

Rosie Fletcher of Total Film noted that the Marvel One-Shot short film Agent Carter was well received by the audience at San Diego Comic-Con, and praised Atwell's performance. Andy Hunsaker at CraveOnline said the short "gives its title character the send-off she deserves", and hoped that it would lead to further female-focused properties from Marvel. IGN's Scott Collura called Atwell "the big-screen female superhero we've all been waiting for. She kicks so much ass in this short story with such aplomb, using not just brawn but also brains, and it's all very clever and fun." He felt the short seemed more of a proof-of-concept that female-based superhero projects could work, but that "Atwell never loses touch with her feminine side" either.

Brian Lowry, reviewing the two-part premiere of the TV series Agent Carter for Variety, felt that giving Atwell her own television series was "a pretty smart bet" by Marvel, and he called the episodes "considerable fun".

The A.V. Club named Atwell's performance as one of the "Best Individual Performances" of 2015.

=== Accolades ===
Year	Award	Category	Work	Result	Ref.
2011	Scream Award	Breakthrough Performance – Female	Captain America: The First Avenger	Nominated	
2011	Scream Award	Best Science Fiction Actress	Captain America: The First Avenger	Nominated	
2014	Saturn Award	Best Actress on Television	Agent Carter	Nominated	

== See also ==
- Characters of the Marvel Cinematic Universe
