= Agents of S.H.I.E.L.D. season 2 =

Agents of S.H.I.E.L.D.
- Season 2
- Promotional poster and home media cover art
- Showrunners: Jed Whedon; Maurissa Tancharoen; Jeffrey Bell
- Starring: Clark Gregg; Ming-Na Wen; Brett Dalton; Chloe Bennet; Iain De Caestecker; Elizabeth Henstridge; Nick Blood; Adrianne Palicki
- No. of episodes: 22

Release
- Original network: ABC
- Original release: September 23, 2014 – May 12, 2015

Season chronology
- ← Previous; Season 1 Next → Season 3

The second season of the American television series Agents of S.H.I.E.L.D., based on the Marvel Comics organization S.H.I.E.L.D., follows Phil Coulson and his team of S.H.I.E.L.D. agents and allies as they attempt to rebuild the organization after it was revealed to have been infiltrated by Hydra in the film Captain America: The Winter Soldier (2014). The season is set in the Marvel Cinematic Universe (MCU) and acknowledges the continuity of the franchise's films and other television series. It was produced by ABC Studios, Marvel Television, and Mutant Enemy Productions, with Jed Whedon, Maurissa Tancharoen, and Jeffrey Bell serving as showrunners.

Clark Gregg reprises his role as Coulson from the film series, starring alongside the returning series regulars Ming-Na Wen, Brett Dalton, Chloe Bennet, Iain De Caestecker, and Elizabeth Henstridge. They are joined by Nick Blood and Adrianne Palicki. A second season of Agents of S.H.I.E.L.D. was ordered in May 2014, and production began in Culver City, California that July. Some episodes directly crossover with the television series Agent Carter and the film Avengers: Age of Ultron (2015), while the Inhumans were introduced to set up the planned film of the same name and connect to the film Guardians of the Galaxy (2014). Glenn Hetrick designed prosthetics for the Inhuman characters. Several actors reprise their MCU roles in the season for guest appearances.

The season aired on ABC from September 23, 2014, to May 12, 2015, and consists of 22 episodes. The season premiere was watched by 5.98 million people, less than half the viewing total for the first season premiere, which was watched by 12.12 million people, and overall the season had lower but much more consistent viewership than the previous season. It also received a much more positive critical response than the first season. The series was renewed for a third season in May 2015.

== Episodes ==
No. overall	No. in season	Title	Directed by	Written by	Original release date	U.S. viewers (millions)
23	1	"Shadows"	Vincent Misiano	Jed Whedon & Maurissa Tancharoen	September 23, 2014	5.98
In 1945, Agent Peggy Carter and the Strategic Scientific Reserve (SSR) raid the last known Hydra base (led by Werner Reinhardt) and confiscate many items, including the Obelisk and a blue body. In the present, Phil Coulson's team monitors a deal revolving around the Obelisk, which goes awry when Carl Creel kills the ex-S.H.I.E.L.D. agent offering the intel and escapes with it. Agent Skye interrogates Grant Ward and learns that Hydra is using communication channels not monitored by S.H.I.E.L.D. The team realizes that General Glenn Talbot is in trouble and rushes to rescue him from Creel, before abducting Talbot themselves and using him to break into a military facility full of confiscated S.H.I.E.L.D. assets. Agent Isabelle Hartley finds the Obelisk, while Skye and Agent Antoine Triplett steal a cloak-capable quinjet. Lance Hunter leaves with his team of mercenaries enlisted by S.H.I.E.L.D., only to be ambushed by Creel, whose attack kills Hartley. Creel then steals the Obelisk for an apparently un-aged Reinhardt, now going by the name Daniel Whitehall.
24	2	"Heavy Is the Head"	Jesse Bochco	Paul Zbyszewski	September 30, 2014	5.05
Following Creel's theft of the Obelisk, Hunter is captured by Talbot's men. Creel absorbs the properties of the Obelisk and accidentally kills a waitress in a bar. He later meets Raina, but declines her offer of help. Talbot tries to persuade Hunter to work for him and sets him free, but Hunter returns to S.H.I.E.L.D., wanting revenge for his fallen friends. Agent Leo Fitz and the mechanic Agent Alphonso Mackenzie are able to build a weapon that can incapacitate Creel. As the team observes Creel making a deal with Whitehall's second-in-command Sunil Bakshi, Hunter disarms the other agents and tries to kill Creel himself. Creel easily defeats Hunter but, just as he is about to kill him, Coulson incapacitates Creel with the new weapon. Coulson later asks Hunter to stay and help S.H.I.E.L.D., then tells Talbot that he is wasting his time tracking S.H.I.E.L.D. and turns Creel over to him. The Obelisk is later shown in the possession of Raina and "The Doctor"—Skye's father—who is asking the former to find his daughter.
25	3	"Making Friends and Influencing People"	Bobby Roth	Monica Owusu-Breen	October 7, 2014	4.47
Coulson learns from Agent Jemma Simmons, who is working undercover within Hydra, that their next planned target for recruitment is Donnie Gill. Ward explains to Skye that Hydra brainwashes promising recruits such as Creel. S.H.I.E.L.D. traces Gill to a Hydra ship in Morocco, while Hydra sends Simmons with a team to find Gill themselves as a test of her loyalty. Fitz reveals to Ward that Gill is the target and Ward warns that Gill was a Hydra asset already, with Hydra only seeking to reactivate his brainwashing. Agent Melinda May, who knows of Simmons' mission, allows her and Gill to escape to maintain Simmons' cover, so Hydra successfully re-brainwashes Gill. Skye manages to shoot him; he falls into the water and freezes, but government forces are later unable to locate his body. Whitehall decides to promote Simmons despite her failure to retrieve Gill and Ward tells Skye that her father is alive, offering to bring her to him.
26	4	"Face My Enemy"	Kevin Tancharoen	Drew Z. Greenberg	October 14, 2014	4.70
Coulson and May go undercover to a charity function to get a painting that is carved with alien symbols. There, they encounter Talbot, who has already claimed it and asks to meet with Coulson in private. Coulson sends May to scout ahead and she discovers the brainwashed S.H.I.E.L.D. Agent 33 in Talbot's hotel room, realizing that the Talbot at the party was actually Bakshi in disguise. Bakshi tortures May while Agent 33 disguises herself as May to pick up Coulson and sabotage the Bus. Coulson realizes that "May" is a fake because of inconsistencies in her behavior. He rescues the real May, who defeats Agent 33, while Fitz and Hunter work together to save the Bus from Hydra's computer virus, allowing Fitz to start reintegrating into the team following previous life-changing injuries. Though Bakshi escapes, S.H.I.E.L.D. claims the painting, hiding its survival from the real Talbot. Raina is later confronted by Whitehall, who orders her to deliver the Obelisk to Hydra or face death.
27	5	"A Hen in the Wolf House"	Holly Dale	Brent Fletcher	October 21, 2014	4.36
Raina begs Skye's father to give her the Obelisk, but he angrily berates her for not delivering Skye, then kills two men for whom he was performing surgery. Raina discovers Simmons' cover and attempts to blackmail Coulson: she will not reveal Simmons to Hydra if she can take Skye to her father. Coulson refuses the offer and Simmons' identity is exposed, though Hydra security chief Bobbi Morse, another undercover S.H.I.E.L.D. agent, rescues her. Coulson has Raina tagged so she can lead them to Hydra; while being surveilled, she also discloses the location of Skye's father. At his abandoned hideout, the team finds the bodies of the men he murdered and he realizes, watching through hidden cameras, that Skye thinks he is a monster. Coulson later shows Skye alien symbols he has been compulsively carving and she believes they are a map. Fitz and Simmons are reunited while Morse, who is Hunter's ex-wife, joins the team. Skye's father delivers the Obelisk to Whitehall himself and offers to join forces with Hydra.
28	6	"A Fractured House"	Ron Underwood	Rafe Judkins & Lauren LeFranc	October 28, 2014	4.44
During a United Nations meeting on S.H.I.E.L.D., Hydra agents posing as S.H.I.E.L.D. operatives attack and kill several world representatives. Senator Christian Ward, the brother of Grant Ward, decides to use this incident to propose a multinational anti-S.H.I.E.L.D. initiative. As Coulson meets Christian to propose a win-win solution, Skye interrogates Grant about Christian. Grant explains to Skye that Christian is a master manipulator. Christian tells Coulson that this is a lie, with both S.H.I.E.L.D. agents attempting to ascertain which Ward brother is being truthful. Christian and Coulson agree to abandon the anti-S.H.I.E.L.D. proposal in exchange for Grant's transfer to Christian to stand trial, but Grant escapes while being transferred. May leads a team against the Hydra agents who attacked the UN, capturing several and turning them over to Talbot, who begins to agree with Coulson's mission and offers his condolences for fallen S.H.I.E.L.D. agents.
29	7	"The Writing on the Wall"	Vincent Misiano	Craig Titley	November 11, 2014	4.27
Since being resurrected by S.H.I.E.L.D.'s Project T.A.H.I.T.I. using the experimental drug GH-325 (derived from the alien corpse Carter discovered in Whitehall's possession), Coulson has been compulsively carving alien symbols. When a former S.H.I.E.L.D. agent and patient of T.A.H.I.T.I. is killed and her body carved with the symbols (by the former agent who had carved the painting previously), Coulson uses Hydra's memory machine to find other patients who were injected with the drug. He goes after the remaining patients, trying to find an end to the madness. He discovers that the writing is actually a 3D diagram of a city where the alien host of GH-325 apparently wished to go. Seeing the completed design ends his need to carve but, since Hydra is also searching for the city, he makes it a priority for S.H.I.E.L.D. to find it first. Meanwhile, the other members of the team try to capture Ward, who betrays Hydra by capturing Bakshi and leaving him for S.H.I.E.L.D. before preparing to meet his brother.
30	8	"The Things We Bury"	Milan Cheylov	DJ Doyle	November 18, 2014	4.58
Bakshi accidentally reveals to Morse that Whitehall is actually Reinhardt, a Nazi scientist who was working on the Obelisk before being captured by the SSR and imprisoned for life by Carter in 1945. In 1989, Reinhardt was released from prison by Alexander Pierce to find that a woman he had found in 1945 was still the same age. Dissecting her, Reinhardt discovered the secret to her immortality and used it to make himself 44 years younger. "The Doctor" finds the remains of the woman, who was his wife, and vows vengeance against Whitehall, with whom he is now pretending to be allied. Grant Ward also appears to join in an alliance with Whitehall, after having tortured Christian into confessing past sins and then apparently murdering him and their parents. S.H.I.E.L.D. hacks a United States Air Force mapping satellite and uses it to find the hidden city. Coulson meets "The Doctor", who knows that the Obelisk (or the Diviner) is a key that must be taken to the city by someone it deems to be worthy.
31	9	"...Ye Who Enter Here"	Billy Gierhart	Paul Zbyszewski	December 2, 2014	5.36
The team splits up, with Coulson and Morse leading a group to begin searching for the hidden city under San Juan, Puerto Rico, and May, Skye, and Hunter leaving to help Agents Sam and Billy Koenig rescue Raina from a Hydra kidnapping attempt in Vancouver. Raina tells Skye that they are two of the "worthy ones" who could enter the temple in the city and that any others who try will die. She also reveals that the city and Diviner were created by the Kree. Skye tries to warn the main team, but Whitehall blocks their communications as Ward boards the Bus to take Raina. He also takes Skye, promising to take her to her father and, in exchange, agrees to let the others go. Mack has already entered the city, which causes him great pain and compels him to attack the others until he is subdued by Morse and falls down a deep shaft. Whitehall, surprised to learn that Ward took Skye and did not destroy the Bus as ordered, gives Agent 33 (who still has May's face, but is now disfigured) orders to do so.
32	10	"What They Become"	Michael Zinberg	Jeffrey Bell	December 9, 2014	5.29
May evades Hydra's attempt to shoot down the Bus. Ward brings Skye to meet her father, Cal, who explains that her name is Daisy and that Whitehall killed her mother. Arriving at the Hydra base in San Juan where they are drilling into the temple, Whitehall immobilizes Cal and menaces Skye, but is interrupted as Coulson's team assaults the base. Coulson kills Whitehall, taking Cal's chance at vengeance and leading the latter to attack Coulson. Skye shoots Ward and forces Cal to leave before following Raina and the Diviner into the temple. Agent 33 assists Ward in escaping. Coulson and Triplett race to the temple, with Triplett making it in and Coulson being delayed by Mack, who soon after breaks from the city's control when the temple closes itself and the Diviner opens, revealing a large crystal. Skye and Raina are encased in cocoons while Triplett is killed by the Diviner. Skye erupts out of her cocoon as an earthquake shakes the city. Elsewhere, another Diviner reveals to a man with no eyes that "there's someone new".
33	11	"Aftershocks"	Billy Gierhart	Maurissa Tancharoen & Jed Whedon	March 3, 2015	4.48
In the wake of Triplett's death, Coulson looks to hit back at Hydra, who are considering having Bakshi fill Whitehall's leadership position. S.H.I.E.L.D. enacts a plan that sees Bakshi escape and lead them to other high-ranking Hydra agents, who are then killed. In San Juan, the alien city is flooded, but not before a transformed Raina escapes, now with a monstrous appearance. When Cal turns his back on her, reminding her that she got what she wanted, Raina attempts to commit suicide, but she is taken by the man with no eyes, Gordon, who can teleport. Fitz and Skye realize that the latter has also been transformed—she caused the earthquake in San Juan, but has no control over this ability. Fitz agrees to keep her secret and hides the truth from the rest of the team. Meanwhile, a model car that Mack built for Coulson scans the latter's office and finds the "toolbox" that previous S.H.I.E.L.D. Director Nick Fury gave to him. Mack, who has been studying the S.H.I.E.L.D. base's schematics, secretly reports this to Morse.
34	12	"Who You Really Are"	Roxann Dawson	Drew Z. Greenberg	March 10, 2015	3.80
S.H.I.E.L.D. is called in to help an amnesiac Sif, who was last seen fighting an incredibly strong man and is searching for something called "Kava", which they soon discover is the location where Whitehall found the Diviner. There, they capture the man, who restores Sif's memories and introduces himself as a Kree named Vin-Tak who has come to destroy all the Diviners and kill anyone affected by the Terrigen crystals inside. When Skye's abilities are revealed, Sif and Vin-Tak attempt to capture and kill her, respectively, but Morse wipes Vin-Tak's memories using his own weapon, while Coulson convinces Sif to leave Skye be. Sif returns Vin-Tak to his planet, warning Coulson that, while the Kree should no longer be a problem, Skye may be a greater danger than he realizes. Meanwhile, Morse tries to end her rekindled relationship with Hunter when Mack warns her that he is getting too close, but Hunter angrily confronts Mack about this and his suspicions that Mack and Morse are hiding something, forcing Mack to knock him unconscious.
35	13	"One of Us"	Kevin Tancharoen	Monica Owusu-Breen	March 17, 2015	4.34
Cal recruits dangerous individuals from S.H.I.E.L.D.'s Gifted Index to settle his vendetta. Coulson and Morse investigate and are led to the former's hometown of Manitowoc, Wisconsin, where the criminals have seized the local school stadium. May enlists Dr. Andrew Garner, her ex-husband and a psychoanalyst, to work with Skye, who is now on the Index herself. During one of Garner's talks with Skye, Coulson requests back-up, prompting May to fly the Bus to Manitowoc with Garner and Skye on board. At the stadium, Coulson is confronted by Cal, while May arrives, bluffing that she will kill Skye. During the stand-off, Gordon appears and teleports away with Cal. As Coulson's team subdues Cal's group, Skye starts causing tremors, only stopping this by directing her abilities inward, resulting in hairline fractures throughout her body. Elsewhere, Mack hides Hunter in a safe house until they are extracted by an organization that Mack calls "the real S.H.I.E.L.D.", and Gordon takes Cal to his superiors, belittling him for using science to increase his strength.
36	14	"Love in the Time of Hydra"	Jesse Bochco	Brent Fletcher	March 24, 2015	4.29
On Garner's recommendation, Coulson pulls Skye from active duty and leaves her at a safe house with gloves designed to help repress her abilities, asking her to take some time to learn to control her powers. Ward and Agent 33 hunt down the man who created the technology that allowed Agent 33 to take on May's appearance. He fixes her mask so she can once more change her appearance to anyone she wishes. Using this, they infiltrate Talbot's base and break out Bakshi, who S.H.I.E.L.D. had handed over as a sign of good faith. From Bakshi, they learn about Agent 33's life prior to him brainwashing her, including her name, Kara Palamas, before brainwashing him themselves. Mack introduces Hunter to Robert Gonzales and the leadership of the "real S.H.I.E.L.D.", founded on the ideal of transparency rather than Fury's mantra of compartmentalization. They see Coulson and his erratic behavior as a threat and, when Hunter escapes, they decide to attack Coulson's group immediately.
37	15	"One Door Closes"	David Solomon	Lauren LeFranc & Rafe Judkins	March 31, 2015	4.26
Gordon visits Skye to tell her of his home, where she can be safe and learn to control her powers without S.H.I.E.L.D.'s gloves. Coulson confronts Mack about the model car and his behavior, deducing that he is a mole. Morse steals the toolbox from Coulson's office and takes over the base's systems, allowing her and Mack to evade capture and the rest of their faction to attack. Their organization was formed after the Hydra Uprising and fall of S.H.I.E.L.D., when Morse, Gonzales, Mack, and Hartley disobeyed Fury's orders, saving hundreds of loyal S.H.I.E.L.D. agents. Gonzales realized all the harm caused by Fury and his secrets, now wanting S.H.I.E.L.D. to exist without them. He and his colleagues fear potential alien and superhuman phenomena that could endanger the rest of the world, including Skye, but, when they try to detain Skye, she accidentally unleashes her abilities. Horrified at what she can do, Skye agrees to go with Gordon. May helps Coulson escape from Gonzales and Coulson soon finds Hunter, who agrees to become a permanent agent.
38	16	"Afterlife"	Kevin Hooks	Craig Titley	April 7, 2015	4.24
Gordon takes Skye to Afterlife, a haven, where Lincoln Campbell explains to her that most people who are transformed are chosen and prepared for it, after which a guide is selected to help these people master their new abilities. Skye's guide is the founder of Afterlife, Jiaying, while Gordon will guide Raina, who still wants to die. When Gonzales asks Fitz and Simmons to help them open Fury's toolbox, Fitz refuses and decides to leave S.H.I.E.L.D., while Simmons agrees to help, though this is a ruse so that Fitz can take the toolbox with him. Coulson and Hunter steal a quinjet from Gonzales' agents with the help of Agent Mike Peterson, who has been hunting Hydra scientist Dr. List and found him experimenting on gifted people. With the appearance of Peterson, Gonzales fears how many super powered operatives Coulson has, but believes that he still deserves fair representation, asking May to serve on their S.H.I.E.L.D. board. Coulson realizes that, to deal with the new Hydra threat, he will have to turn to Grant Ward.
39	17	"Melinda"	Garry A. Brown	DJ Doyle	April 14, 2015	4.04
Now in charge of Coulson's base, May agrees to look into his actions since he became Director, finding that Coulson has been secretly building another base and consulting with Garner, which Mack believes is because he is creating a gifted army. Skye is training with Jiaying and begins to focus her abilities to manipulate objects' natural frequencies. Jiaying soon reveals that she is Skye's mother—Cal had pieced her back together, her healing factor revived her, and they searched for Skye, who S.H.I.E.L.D. had taken. Once Jiaying realized what monsters they had become, she left Cal to build a new and peaceful life. Their relationship must remain a secret because a member of their group once stole Terrigen crystals for her daughter, who then forced her mother to hurt others to feed on their pain. They were stopped when May killed them both, scarring her for life. However, Jiaying and Skye do agree to join Cal for dinner, a moment that Raina apparently foresaw in a dream. Fitz opens the toolbox and uses it to contact Coulson.
40	18	"The Frenemy of My Enemy"	Karen Gaviola	Monica Owusu-Breen & Paul Zbyszewski	April 21, 2015	4.45
Coulson, Hunter, Fitz, and Peterson capture Ward and Palamas and make a deal to infiltrate Hydra in exchange for giving Ward a clean slate by wiping his memories. Ward uses the brainwashed Bakshi, along with Peterson, to get close to List and they learn that he has been tracking Gordon and seeks to capture him. Jiaying intends to banish Cal from Afterlife, but Skye fears he may harm innocents and so goes with him, before calling May for help. Simmons hacks into Peterson's cybernetic eye and, through his video feed, S.H.I.E.L.D. discovers that Coulson is working with Ward. May sends Bobbi and Mack. As Cal is enjoying spending time with Skye, their discovery that Lincoln is spying on them makes Cal realize what Jiaying has planned. Hydra tracks Gordon's movements to Cal's office and attacks before Cal can do anything about Lincoln. Hydra captures Peterson and Lincoln. Skye is almost reunited with Coulson, but Gordon takes her and Cal away. When Bobbi and Mack arrive, Coulson surrenders to them.
41	19	"The Dirty Half Dozen"	Kevin Tancharoen	Brent Fletcher & Drew Z. Greenberg	April 28, 2015	4.57
Coulson offers to take his own team to infiltrate List's base and free Peterson and Lincoln. Raina foresees Skye saving Lincoln's life and they convince Gordon to take her to S.H.I.E.L.D. without telling Jiaying, who allows Cal to stay in Afterlife (though he does accidentally reveal to the community that Skye is their daughter). Coulson, May, Skye, Fitz, Simmons, and Ward infiltrate the Hydra base with the help of Bakshi on the inside. Simmons and Ward save Peterson, but Simmons attempts to kill Ward for all that he has done to them. Bakshi sacrifices himself to save Ward, who decides to leave by himself. Skye does save Lincoln, while Coulson discovers the base of Hydra's leader, Baron Wolfgang von Strucker. He gives the location to Maria Hill so that the Avengers can defeat Hydra. Ward leaves Palamas with S.H.I.E.L.D., hoping that she can reclaim her lost life as an agent, while Raina, who is beginning to question Jiaying's leadership, foresees metal men destroying cities.
42	20	"Scars"	Bobby Roth	Rafe Judkins & Lauren LeFranc	May 5, 2015	4.45
The S.H.I.E.L.D. board is grateful to Coulson after Fury uses Coulson's secret helicarrier to save lives during the Battle of Sokovia. They agree to merge their factions, with Coulson remaining as director and the board acting as his oversight and advisory council. Raina has a vision of an ancient Kree weapon, designed to destroy the Inhumans—those who were altered by the Kree. Gordon takes her to search for it, finding it in the cargo hold of Gonzales' ship. S.H.I.E.L.D. discovers the intruders and uses Hydra technology to track them when they teleport away, learning the location of Afterlife. Palamas reveals Ward's true plan when she helps him kidnap Morse. Gonzales leads a delegation to Afterlife to meet Jiaying and index the community. Raina foresees war if Jiaying meets with S.H.I.E.L.D., but it is implied that she is lying in order to seize power. When Jiaying and Gonzales meet, she delivers Cal into S.H.I.E.L.D. custody, before killing Gonzales and shooting herself to start a war with S.H.I.E.L.D. rather than let her people be indexed.
43	21	"S.O.S."	Vincent Misiano	Jeffrey Bell	May 12, 2015	3.88
44	22	"S.O.S."	Billy Gierhart	Jed Whedon & Maurissa Tancharoen	May 12, 2015	3.88
Part 1: S.H.I.E.L.D. quickly realizes Jiaying's ruse, but the people of Afterlife, including Skye, fall for it and agree to fight alongside her. Ward tortures Morse, wanting her to confess to the fact that she revealed Palamas' location to Hydra while undercover there. Realizing that Morse is confident in her actions, Ward sets a trap that will end with a S.H.I.E.L.D. agent, presumably Hunter, being killed in front of her. As part of Jiaying's plan, Cal takes a serum that he created to give himself Inhuman strength, but it also progressively kills him. Coulson helps him see the truth: Jiaying is the true monster and, ever since Cal pieced her back together, she has been convincing him to do terrible things, including bringing her humans, whose lives she absorbs in order to heal and remain young. After failing to convince Skye that Jiaying is dangerous, Raina confronts Jiaying, who kills her. Seeing this, Skye turns her back on Jiaying. Part 2: Morse takes the bullet meant for Hunter, barely surviving; Ward accidentally kills Palamas while she is disguised as May. The Inhumans take Skye prisoner and attack the S.H.I.E.L.D. ship, planning to use artificial Terrigen crystals (laced with Diviner metal) to reveal all Inhumans and kill all humans. Mack frees Skye, who warns Coulson of Jiaying's plan; Coulson, Fitz, and Cal infiltrate the ship. Fitz kills Gordon, preventing him from unleashing Terrigen mist through the ship's ventilation. However, Coulson loses a hand when he stops one of the crystals from shattering. Skye confronts Jiaying, who is attempting to spread more crystals around the world with a Quinjet. When Skye pushes the plane into the ocean, Jiaying begins draining her life until Cal kills Jiaying. S.H.I.E.L.D. later wipes Cal's memories, allowing him to live a new life in peace, while Skye joins a new S.H.I.E.L.D. team of gifted people, May takes a break from S.H.I.E.L.D. with Garner, and Ward plans to lead the remains of Hydra against S.H.I.E.L.D. As traces of the crystals from the ocean make their way around the world, the Kree weapon known as the Monolith absorbs Simmons.

== Cast and characters ==
=== Main ===
- Clark Gregg as Phil Coulson
- Ming-Na Wen as Melinda May
- Brett Dalton as Grant Ward
- Chloe Bennet as Skye / Daisy Johnson
- Iain De Caestecker as Leo Fitz
- Elizabeth Henstridge as Jemma Simmons
- Nick Blood as Lance Hunter
- Adrianne Palicki as Bobbi Morse

=== Recurring ===
- B. J. Britt as Antoine Triplett
- Reed Diamond as Werner Reinhardt / Daniel Whitehall
- Henry Simmons as Alphonso "Mack" Mackenzie
- Patton Oswalt as Billy and Sam Koenig
- Adrian Pasdar as Glenn Talbot
- Simon Kassianides as Sunil Bakshi
- Kyle MacLachlan as Calvin Johnson (Note: Although the name Zabo is never actually used in the series, the character mentions changing his surname from Johnson to "something more sinister", and has been referred to as Calvin Zabo by Marvel.)
- Ruth Negga as Raina
- Maya Stojan as Kara Palamas / Agent 33
- Dichen Lachman as Jiaying
- Jamie Harris as Gordon
- Christine Adams as Anne Weaver
- Edward James Olmos as Robert Gonzales
- Luke Mitchell as Lincoln Campbell

=== Notable guests ===
- Hayley Atwell as Peggy Carter
- Neal McDonough as Timothy "Dum Dum" Dugan
- Kenneth Choi as Jim Morita
- Dylan Minnette as Donnie Gill
- Tim DeKay as Christian Ward
- Henry Goodman as List
- Jaimie Alexander as Sif
- J. August Richards as Mike Peterson / Deathlok
- Cobie Smulders as Maria Hill

== Production ==
=== Development ===
In March 2014, executive producer Jeffrey Bell stated at the Agents of S.H.I.E.L.D. PaleyFest panel that the writers are able to read the screenplays for upcoming Marvel Cinematic Universe (MCU) films to know where the universe is heading, which allowed them to form a plan for the show through the end of a third season. On May 8, 2014, the series was renewed for a second season of 22 episodes.

=== Writing ===
In July 2014, Clark Gregg stated that the season resumes months after the end of season one, and "the monumental nature of [rebuilding S.H.I.E.L.D.] is made very clear almost immediately, because you realize everyone—US government, US military and other wise—wants to arrest us. S.H.I.E.L.D.'s illegal. We have very few resources. Everything we're going to do involves dealing with, still, finding out who's Hydra and who's not amongst our friends. To rebuild S.H.I.E.L.D., we're going to need some old friends to prove themselves, some new friends, and we're going to have to do it in a way that's very back alley, old school."

In September 2014, talking about whether the ending of the season would also be a satisfying end to the series, Bell said "we're not thinking of it as a series finale as much as a season finale ... I think we have some momentum coming in [to season 2] and I think we pick up on it. I'm optimistic that we can keep the plane in the air a little longer." He also talked about whether the themes of family and connectedness from the first season would be re-explored in the second, saying "What we always look for are the human elements in the big story. That's what television does well, it makes you care about people, and whether it's literal family or anytime you have a team of people working together, it takes on some sort of family metaphor." Bell reiterated the idea of family following the end of the season, saying "In many ways, the whole metaphor at the heart of the show is family—you've got Coulson and May and then a bunch of younger people, and it allows us to play out different dynamics; literally, this season, we had Skye's biological parents versus her surrogate parents. And at the same time, we had Skye growing up. We had her going from a slightly sulky hacker season one to training to become an agent to becoming our first full-fledged superhero and so as we grow up, we separate from our parents... In our minds, her mom wasn't a villain so much; she was an antagonist, but if you look at why she feels the way she does, Jiaying really earned that position." Discussing the reveal that Skye is actually Daisy Johnson, Maurissa Tancharoen explained that

Johnson is a character that we always liked. We always knew there was a potential to evolve Skye into something else. It took a little bit of time, but we were happy when we were able to land on Daisy Johnson, and actually have that work in our mythology. But as with everything that we do on the show, we pull from the properties, and we do our own spin to it. So we are kind of merging a few concepts and storylines. We've spent a season and a half with Skye. We've seen her evolve as a person, we've grown to like her as a person, we've seen her evolve as an agent. And now, finally bringing her to her origin story—I think there's just a lot more emotional weight to it, because you already know her as just Skye, and now she will have this ability that she may not understand, that she may not want ... We're going to focus on Skye, and how that affects the people around her, and how the relationships may shift. Because we've seen through the course of our series so far; we've spoken about how S.H.I.E.L.D. treats gifteds or views them, and they're categorized, things like that. What does that mean when one of your own is now considered someone with an ability? How do you categorize her?

Whedon elaborated that "We're going to walk her through the steps of discovering what this really means, and coming to terms with it. All that stuff is really interesting to us, and in television, because we have time to explore, we can take her origin on all sorts of different paths." Additionally, Whedon talked about how the character would be referred to on the show after the reveal, saying, "She's still Skye, because she thinks she's Skye. I think her dad thinks she's Daisy, and we'll see if she ever gets to the point where she believes that that's something that she would want to call herself. But right now, she has her own identity."

In December 2014, Jed Whedon explained the benefits of introducing a society of superhuman characters in the Inhumans, saying "One of the things that, early on was very important to us last season was, there were so few people in the Cinematic Universe who had powers. Really, only two humans had powers, Captain America and the Hulk. We had to be very responsible—we didn't want to dive into this show and have a new one every week, and have it feel like we disregarded everything that they spent so much money and time building in the films. Along those same lines, the origin of a power is always a complex thing—Marvel cares about it feeling grounded, it feeling scientific at some level. Even on Thor, he says, 'In our world, magic and science are the same thing.' So this is a way for us to sort of open up our world. It's a way to introduce, into the MCU, the idea that people can be born with a power. They don't have to be engineered in a lab, they don't need to have some freak accident with a vat of acid. They can be born with this. That's sort of a gamechanger, not just on our show, but in the cinematic universe".

After the season finale, Bell talked about Coulson losing his arm, saying that "he paid a price—that was important to us. You don't mess with the forces of nature without getting bitten, and the fact that he literally saved everyone on the ship by that crystal not shattering was a wonderful, heroic thing and showed you that at heart, Coulson is a heroic man whose actions back up his words." Bell also talked about the cliffhanger involving Simmons being absorbed by a Kree monolith: "When we first started talking about the Monolith, we knew that it needed to present a threat and we needed to demonstrate some of that threat and the promise of more story... It's easy to kill a character for shock value or whatever, and we did have a number of deaths this season, but ... we prefer to leave you with something to talk about, to walk away with. This is something that came up in the room, we talked about what it meant ... The idea of getting Fitz and Simmons—who had been one person—to become two whole people, come back together, agree to go on a date, and then have this happen, felt beautifully poetic".

=== Casting ===
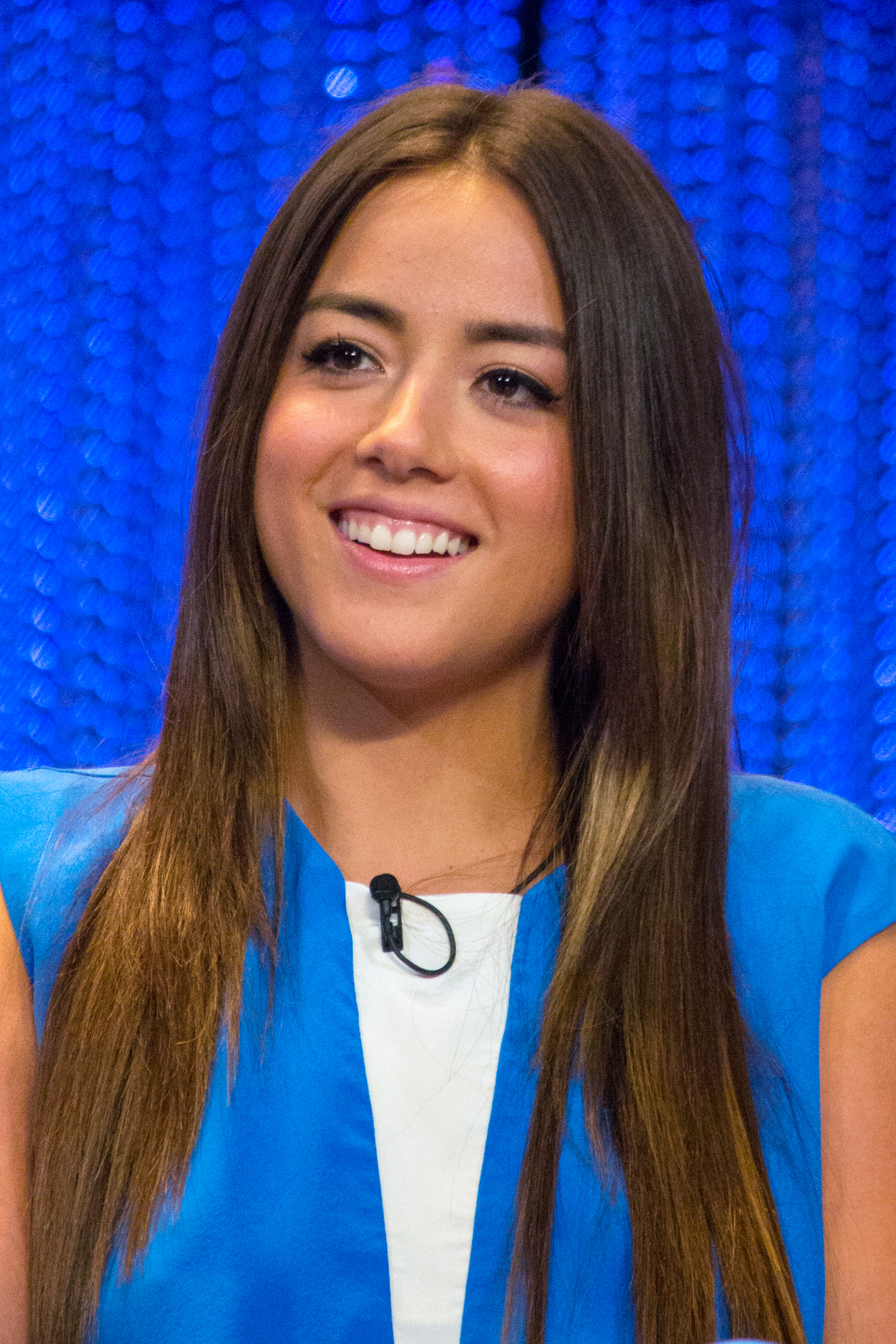
Chloe Bennet portrays series regular Skye, who is revealed to be a version of Daisy Johnson in the season

All principal cast members from the first season (Clark Gregg as Phil Coulson, Ming-Na Wen as Melinda May, Brett Dalton as Grant Ward, Chloe Bennet as Skye, Iain De Caestecker as Leo Fitz, and Elizabeth Henstridge as Jemma Simmons) returned for the second season, and were joined by Nick Blood as Lance Hunter. In December 2014, main character Skye was revealed to be a version of Daisy Johnson. With the episode "Aftershocks", Adrianne Palicki, who portrays Bobbi Morse, was upgraded to a principal cast member. Also returning from earlier in the series are Christine Adams as Anne Weaver, Jaimie Alexander as Sif, B. J. Britt as Antoine Triplett, Imelda Corcoran as Goodman, Dylan Minnette as Donnie Gill, Ruth Negga as Raina, Patton Oswalt as Sam and Billy Koenig, Adrian Pasdar as Glenn Talbot, J. August Richards as Mike Peterson / Deathlok, and Cobie Smulders as Maria Hill.

At San Diego Comic-Con in July 2014, Reed Diamond was announced as portraying Daniel Whitehall. In August, Kyle MacLachlan was cast as Skye's father, in a recurring role. Initially referred to as "The Doctor", his character was revealed to be Calvin Zabo in December 2014. In "Making Friends and Influencing People", the character of Kara Palamas / Agent 33 was introduced, portrayed by Maya Stojan. She is also portrayed by other cast members, including Ming-Na Wen and Chloe Bennet, when she takes on the appearance of their characters. On October 1, 2014, Tim DeKay was cast as Senator Christian Ward, the older brother of principal character Grant Ward, who had previously appeared as a teenager through flashbacks in "The Well". In January 2015, Edward James Olmos was cast as Robert Gonzales, a leader of the "Real S.H.I.E.L.D." group. Mark Allan Stewart makes several appearances as another "Real S.H.I.E.L.D." leader, Agent Oliver. Other recurring guests include Jamie Harris as Gordon, Simon Kassianides as Sunil Bakshi, Dichen Lachman as Jiaying, Luke Mitchell as Lincoln Campbell, and Henry Simmons as Alphonso "Mack" Mackenzie.

Additionally, Hayley Atwell, Kenneth Choi, Henry Goodman, and Neal McDonough reprise their roles from MCU films and Marvel One-Shots, as Peggy Carter, Jim Morita, Dr. List, and Timothy "Dum Dum" Dugan, respectively, during the season.

=== Design ===
During the season, the producers worked with Glenn Hetrick of Optic Nerve Studios to help create Raina's Inhuman look, and introduce the Inhumans to the MCU. To get to the final look, the writers spent a lot of time discussing what her transformed look would entail, such as if she would have a nose, or a tail, with series writer Drew Greenberg eventually suggesting thorns. With the design idea in hand, Hetrick and his team began compiling potential designs for the character, looking to the Clive Barker film Nightbreed, specifically the character Shuna Sassi, because "She's a creature covered in porcupine quills and that image is so strong — it creates such a striking silhouette". Since Hetrick and his team did not have source material to pull from in the comics, he wanted to "make her feel like the first real Inhuman" and give her face a level of symmetry. When creating the prosthetic makeup, which was done in two weeks, the producers wanted to still be able to see Negga's eyes, with Bell saying, "Ruth Negga has amazingly expressive eyes and eyebrows. And she gets so much of who Raina is through the eyes. We wanted her to still be able to communicate, we still wanted you to feel her expressions through all of [the makeup]."

For the "real S.H.I.E.L.D." faction introduced this season, the producers and Marvel decided to create a new S.H.I.E.L.D. logo to differentiate from the normal one used on the series. This new logo uses the shape of Captain America's original shield, as opposed to the updated round shape, and has three stars on it.

=== Filming ===
Production on the season began in late July 2014, in Culver City, California. Additional photography took place around the world, including in Old San Juan, Puerto Rico for "...Ye Who Enter Here" and "What They Become".

=== Music ===
To reflect the darker tone of the second season, the standard orchestra was changed from season one, with the low brass and strings expanded, and the woodwind section reduced, "giving [the orchestra] added punch and menace". Composer Bear McCreary's use of the electric guitar was also reduced for the second season, while his general synth programming was changed from "warm, round tones" to "mangled under heavy distortion" sound.

McCreary introduced a new Hydra theme for the season, explaining that "Last season got pretty musically complicated. I had a theme that associated itself with Centipede, The Clairvoyant, John Garrett and Raina. That theme ultimately functioned like a Hydra Theme. I had a theme for Victoria Hand that, while the audience briefly suspected her, also functioned as the Hydra Theme. I had a[nother] theme for Garrett that also acted like the theme for Hydra. It got so complicated ... The answer was obvious: I needed to write a new Hydra Theme, one that could be associated with Dr. Whitehall." For Hayley Atwell's appearances as Peggy Carter, McCreary decided to quote the Agent Carter theme composed by Christopher Lennertz for the Agent Carter short film. On using Lennertz's theme, McCreary said, "I was excited for the opportunity to incorporate his music into my S.H.I.E.L.D. score, because it further cements the Marvel [Cinematic] Universe together as a coherent whole ... Chris was thrilled and sent me his scores for reference." The soundtrack titled Marvel's Agents of S.H.I.E.L.D. (Original Soundtrack Album) featuring music from the first and second seasons was released by Marvel Music digitally on September 4, 2015, and on CD in October 2015.

=== Marvel Cinematic Universe tie-ins ===
Executive producer Maurissa Tancharoen stated the production team was not ruling out creating crossover episodes with Agent Carter or Guardians of the Galaxy during the season, with executive producer Jed Whedon adding that any such episodes would not equal the scale seen in the Captain America: The Winter Soldier crossover from the first season, saying, "In terms of game-changers, [those episodes are] hard to beat." Bell later said Avengers: Age of Ultron "is coming up and we know what's going on with that and look forward to seeing it, but it's pretty cool to find ways to tie-in stuff and connect things". In December 2014, ABC confirmed the series would tie-in with Avengers: Age of Ultron, with Whedon saying, "You should expect something. The Avengers is the big tent that all the franchises play under. Obviously, we're included in that." The episodes "The Frenemy of My Enemy" and "The Dirty Half Dozen" feature "Easter eggs, plot threads and other connective tissue leading into the opening scene of Avengers: Age of Ultron" while "Scars" explores the aftermath of the film.

Talking on how the season would interact with Agent Carter, Bell said, "Here's what I think is interesting. Agent Carter seems to be about SSR pre-S.H.I.E.L.D., but about the beginnings of something, and the basic values of that. S.H.I.E.L.D. got blown up last year and what Coulson always wanted was a return to basics, and it gives us an opportunity to return to some of those core values and even physically, some of that SSR stuff has a way of finding its way into our show that could be cool. Anyway we can tie things together, we're going to try to do it, but it is hard when the stories are 60 years apart." Several scenes in "Shadows" and "The Things We Bury" are flashbacks featuring Peggy Carter which serve as an introduction to the world of Agent Carter, setting up characters and ideas for that series, including Carter's belief in the need for "a permanent unit during peacetime", which will lead to the creation of S.H.I.E.L.D. The episode "Making Friends and Influencing People" names Hydra's ability to brainwash people as the Faustus Method, named for the character who appears, as Johann Fennhoff, in Agent Carter, played by Ralph Brown.

The season confirms that the blue alien seen in the first season, and a recurring plot point this season, was a member of the Kree race, who play a significant role in Guardians of the Galaxy. Whedon explained that "We obviously showed this body a year ago at around this time. When we were breaking that and sussing out what this arc would be, we had to have a lot of the pieces in place from the get go ... we had to talk to features about what their plans were and where they were going." When asked whether this counts as the series tie-in to Guardians of the Galaxy, Whedon said "It is a very far away other galaxy, so it's a little bit harder to have one of them walk into our set, so a direct tie-in is a little bit more challenging, but it's all one universe, so there's always opportunity for more. ... In Guardians, we saw parts in our universe that we hadn't explored yet, so it shows we're a part of that too." This storyline also introduces the Inhumans to the MCU, ahead of their own film that was planned.

At the end of the season, Bell stated on the way that the season had tied in with the films, "we got to be our own show and tell our own stories in the Marvel Cinematic Universe and do a nice hand off or a tie-in, but neither are incumbent upon the other to be a follow, and I think that's a great model for us".

== Marketing ==
A motion poster released in December 2014, showing the shift in focus from Hydra in the first half of the season to the Inhumans in the second.

At the 2014 San Diego Comic-Con, ahead of the premiere of the season, Marvel Custom Solutions and Lexus released a limited single-issue comic tie-in titled Agents of S.H.I.E.L.D.: The Chase, set between the season 1 episodes "Seeds" and "T.R.A.C.K.S.", written by George Kitson, and with art by Mirko Colak, Neil Edwards, and Mirco Pierfederici. On October 10, 2014, "Face My Enemy" was screened at New York Comic Con.

A five-part web series titled Agents of S.H.I.E.L.D.: Double Agent, also sponsored by Lexus, was released from March 4 to May 6, 2015, on ABC.com. The web series follows a newly hired Agents of S.H.I.E.L.D. production assistant, who acts as a double agent for the "Mastermind", portrayed by Stan Lee. Cast and crew members from the series, such as Gregg, also appear, with viewers having the ability to vote in an online poll after each episode to guess where the double agent would go in the next episode; votes entered viewers in a drawing to win prizes from the set of Agents of S.H.I.E.L.D. Agents of S.H.I.E.L.D.: Double Agent was nominated for Outstanding Digital Series at the 27th Producers Guild of America Awards.

=== "The Art of Evolution" ===
For the final twelve episodes of the season, Marvel once again ran the "Art of..." initiative, in which a different image was released each Thursday before a new episode, depicting a first look at a key event from the upcoming episode, with the season's title being "The Art of Evolution". The different artists were once again chosen to create the teaser posters, based on their previous work and how it connected to the themes and emotion of the intended episode. On how what is shown on each poster is chosen, Bell said, "maybe we'll show [the artist] the script or let them watch the episode and let them respond to it emotionally and see what's interesting to them. And then we have a conversation with them about how we'd like to portray that, and then we try to lean into the strengths that they have. Some are more graphic, some are more character based, some are more composite, and some are cleaner. And that's one of the things [the producers] really look forward to each week, getting the initial sketches back from the artists and seeing their interpretation." The art once again appeared as variant covers to select titles published by Marvel Comics in June 2015.

The poster for "Aftershocks", created by Gabriele Dell'Otto, the co-creator of Daisy Johnson, depicts Skye twice, as she is transforming from the Terrigen mist and as the person dealing with her powers, as well as a transformed Raina, Coulson and the S.H.I.E.L.D. logo in the background. For "Who You Really Are", the producers enlisted Marcos Martín to create the poster, which highlighted Sif's (Jaimie Alexander) return to the show, as well as an "inside look" at S.H.I.E.L.D. as the logo crumbles, with Skye in the center of it, ambiguously leaving the viewer questioning if the logo was crumbling due to Sif's sword, or Skye's powers. The third poster, for "One of Us", was created by Declan Shalvey and Jordie Bellaire. It features muted colors and shows "Coulson surrounded by villains [from the S.H.I.E.L.D. index], and the giant Cal looming over, and [a bird and] S.H.I.E.L.D. behind him". Annie Wu was brought on for the "Love in the Time of Hydra" poster, which shows Grant Ward holding a woman, though depicts her as two; one drawn in red, the other in blue – "half of that goes to Agent 33, who has two faces... And it also goes to the fact that she's been imitating other people as she did with Agent May."

"One Door Closes", an episode focused on Bobbi Morse's history, received a poster of her with the "real S.H.I.E.L.D." logo, that "embraced the basics" of four-color printing, utilizing magenta, cyan, black and yellow, while still having layers and complications, much like the character of Morse. The poster was designed by Delicious Design League. The poster for "Afterlife" by Dave Johnson, highlights the divide within S.H.I.E.L.D. and the alliances on each side. With Coulson in the middle, Agents Gonzales, Morse, Mackenzie and Weaver stem from the "real S.H.I.E.L.D.", while Hunter, Fitz and Simmons stem from the other. "Melinda"'s poster, by Jenny Frison, mirrored the focus of the episode by prominently featuring an image of May, highlighting her backstory and why she is called "the Cavalry". Marvel teamed with Nathan Fox on the poster for "The Frenemy of My Enemy", which depicts Ward, Kara, and Bakshi in "Hydra red"; Coulson, Hunter, and Fitz in "S.H.I.E.L.D. blue"; and Deathlok neutral. They are all featured together, just as the season is "starting to put [all of its plotlines] together in new combinations in new ways, [to] propel us into the last four episodes".

As alluded to by the episode title, the poster for "The Dirty Half Dozen", with art by Jake Wyatt, sees the original recruits to Coulson's S.H.I.E.L.D. team from the first season (May, Ward, Fitz, Simmons, and Skye), along with Coulson, together once again, suiting up for a mission together; it is also the first poster of the "Art of..." series to feature the episode title on the poster. Marguerite Sauvage provided the poster for "Scars", which prominently features Jiaying and her scars in a way that the series cannot do with special effects, while also depicting Skye near the former's stomach to cement the maternal connection between them. For Part One of the season finale, "S.O.S", Ryan Sook's poster hints at Cal's transformation into the Mr. Hyde persona from the comics, in an homage to traditional comic book covers. For Part Two, artist Joshua Budich brought together all of the main players of the season, divided into Coulson and his team, and those who served as antagonists to them throughout the season (though not necessarily villains), with Skye and Terrigen crystals in the middle, pointing to Skye's confused allegiances and the importance of the crystals in the finale.

== Release ==
=== Broadcast ===
In June 2014, Clark Gregg stated he believed the season would be shown in a block of 10 episodes, then breaking for Agent Carter, before airing the remaining 12. Explaining this decision, Bell said,

One of our challenges last year was to produce 22 episodes that aired over, what, 40 weeks? 36 weeks? Something like that. And the age of re-runs is dead. Re-runs are death, and so you're trying to commit to the habit of the show and [viewers] tune in to something else or a re-run and they'll get pissed off. They'll go away. What this allows us to do is minimize repeats. We're showing ten episodes, and there has to be a gap or two because it's physically impossible to produce ten shows and get through post production in time, we can't do that so there's going to be a Marvel special at some point. But pretty much every week you're showing up and we're there, and then instead of a repeat showing up mid-run and losing momentum, Agent Carter comes in and has its own cool stuff, and they're running eight weeks in a row, then we can come back and run twelve in a row with no interruptions. We're still producing our show every week but it just gives us time, barely, to finish 22 on schedule. It takes out the need for repeats in the back half.

The season began airing on September 23, 2014, on ABC in the United States, and on CTV in Canada, and concluded on May 12, 2015. In Australia, the season debuted on September 29, 2014, on Seven Network, while Channel 4 in the United Kingdom premiered the season on October 24, 2014.

=== Home media ===
The season began streaming on Netflix in the United States on June 11, 2015, and was available until February 28, 2022. It was released on Blu-ray and DVD as an Amazon.com exclusive on September 18, 2015. It became available on Disney+ in the United States on March 16, 2022, joining other territories where it was already available on the service.

== Reception ==
=== Ratings ===
Viewership and ratings per episode of Agents of S.H.I.E.L.D. season 2
No.	Title	Air date	Rating/share (18–49)	Viewers (millions)	DVR (18–49)	DVR viewers (millions)	Total (18–49)	Total viewers (millions)
1	"Shadows"	September 23, 2014	2.1/6	5.98	1.6	4.00	3.6	9.66
2	"Heavy Is the Head"	September 30, 2014	1.8/5	5.05	1.3	3.33	3.0	7.90
3	"Making Friends and Influencing People"	October 7, 2014	1.6/5	4.47	1.2	2.78	2.8	7.25
4	"Face My Enemy"	October 14, 2014	1.7/5	4.70	1.3	3.09	3.0	7.80
5	"A Hen in the Wolf House"	October 21, 2014	1.6/4	4.36	1.3	3.27	2.9	7.63
6	"A Fractured House"	October 28, 2014	1.7/5	4.44	1.3	3.00	3.0	7.44
7	"The Writing on the Wall"	November 11, 2014	1.5/4	4.27	1.4	3.33	2.9	7.60
8	"The Things We Bury"	November 18, 2014	1.6/5	4.58	1.3	3.13	2.9	7.70
9	"...Ye Who Enter Here"	December 2, 2014	1.8/5	5.36	1.3	3.28	3.1	8.63
10	"What They Become"	December 9, 2014	1.7/5	5.29	1.3	3.02	3.0	8.31
11	"Aftershocks"	March 3, 2015	1.6/5	4.48	1.3	3.03	2.9	7.51
12	"Who You Really Are"	March 10, 2015	1.5/4	3.80	1.1	2.82	2.6	6.62
13	"One of Us"	March 17, 2015	1.6/5	4.34	1.2	3.06	2.8	7.39
14	"Love in the Time of Hydra"	March 24, 2015	1.5/5	4.29	1.3	2.99	2.8	7.28
15	"One Door Closes"	March 31, 2015	1.4/4	4.26	1.1	2.65	2.5	6.91
16	"Afterlife"	April 7, 2015	1.5/5	4.24	1.1	2.68	2.6	6.92
17	"Melinda"	April 14, 2015	1.6/5	4.04	1.1	2.72	2.7	6.76
18	"The Frenemy of My Enemy"	April 21, 2015	1.6/5	4.45	1.1	2.57	2.7	7.02
19	"The Dirty Half Dozen"	April 28, 2015	1.5/5	4.57	1.1	2.67	2.6	7.24
20	"Scars"	May 5, 2015	1.5/5	4.45	1.1	2.65	2.6	7.10
21–22	"S.O.S."	May 12, 2015	1.3/4	3.88	1.2	—N/a	2.5	—N/a

The season averaged 7.09 million total viewers, including from DVR, ranking 76th among network series in the 2014–15 television season. It also had an average total 18-49 rating of 2.7, which was 32nd.

=== Critical response ===
The review aggregator website Rotten Tomatoes reports a 91% approval rating with an average score of 7.7/10, based on 33 reviews. The website's consensus reads, "Marvel's Agents of S.H.I.E.L.D. relaxes into itself during its sophomore season, mitigating the show's growing pains by focusing on characters while amping up narrative thrills."

Marc Buston for Den of Geek scored the premiere episode 4.5 stars out of 5, feeling that the series had finally reached its potential by incorporating Marvel elements such as Creel and Whitehall, while also creating a darker tone and developing the original characters. He specifically highlighted the changes made to Fitz' character, saying "This lair of tragedy greatly deepens Fitz's character and gives the comic relief of last season a heartbreaking edge." James Hunt, also for Den of Geek, gave a positive review as well, stating "The momentum of last season's finale hasn't been lost, and indeed, it's even been added to. Last year I criticised the pilot episode for, above all else, failing to recreate the feel of the Marvel Cinematic Universe. This year, it's only fair that I praise the season opener for doing exactly that." Kevin Fitzpatrick at ScreenCrush called the premiere "unexpectedly good", noting that the series "remains as serialized a show as it can over 22 episodes", introducing new and interesting ideas for the rest of the season, while also setting a high standard for subsequent episodes to meet.

Alan Sepinwall at HitFix called the episode a promising start to the season, "a fairly lively hour in spite of [a lot of exposition], helped by some good casting and smart creative choices". He was positive about both the changes to the existing characters and the introduction of the new ones, and though he noted that the opening sequence was "itself a piece of brand extension — early promotion for Agent Carter", he felt that "Links to the rest of the Marvel [Cinematic U]niverse are always welcome when they're in service to the story the show is telling". Eric Goldman of IGN scored the episode an 8.3 out of 10, praising the visual style, which he called "less glossy" than previous episodes, as well as the introduction of new characters and development of old ones, especially the introduction of Carl Creel and the "nicely done FX showing off his power". Oliver Sava of The A.V. Club graded the episode a "B−", feeling that "With a clearly defined villain and mission statement, this show's second season is already off to a better start than its first year, but there's still plenty of room for the series to grow. The scripts could use more energy, the action could be better choreographed, and it could use a huge injection of style for both the visual and audio elements. There's so much potential in Agents Of S.H.I.E.L.D. ... but the show's creators aren't fully exploring it yet."

At the end of the season, Goldman graded it an 8.2 out of 10, saying the season "found the show much-improved, as it moved faster and delved deeper into the Marvel Cinematic Universe". Compared to the first season, Goldman felt the "pacing was hugely improved, with storylines no longer taking forever to bubble up again and secrets no longer being kept both from the audience and the characters", with content from the first season being resolved, while still introducing new plot lines and mysteries to play out over the season. He also praised the characterization improvement and called the season "less restrained" in connecting to its comics roots. While he appreciated the new characters that join the series, specifically MacLachlan's portrayal of Cal, he felt Triplett was "never fully utilized", which made his death in the midseason finale less impactful. Additionally, Goldman criticized the tie-in to Age of Ultron, calling it "forced" and distracting from the Inhuman/S.H.I.E.L.D. 2.0 storylines. Nick Hogan at TVOvermind rated the season 9 out of 10 stars, calling it, "for the most part, a very enjoyable season of television". Hogan praised that cast and characters, particularly MacLachlan's portrayal of Calvin Zabo, saying "He had perhaps the strongest character arc of anyone this season, and it was such a pleasure to watch". He did criticize some of the story direction, feeling that it took a while for the Inhumans to connect to the rest of the series, and that the way the Age of Ultron tie-in concluded the S.H.I.E.L.D. vs. S.H.I.E.L.D. storyline was "rushed and choppy".

=== Analysis ===
The season's introduction of the Inhumans and apparent willingness to establish new norms ahead of the films has been highlighted by critics:

Sava felt that having the series introduce the race made Agents of S.H.I.E.L.D. "an essential part of Marvel Studios' bigger plans for the future", explaining that "the series has become more and more connected to the larger MCU since Captain America: The Winter Soldier, but it's always been in a reactive role. Stuff happens in the movies, and Agents Of S.H.I.E.L.D. deals with the fallout. Not anymore. This show is making things happen, and these events will clearly impact the future of the MCU because we know there's an Inhumans movie planned for 2019." Sava also mentioned that introducing the Inhumans "on a personal level rather than a cosmic level" via the television series makes "the whole idea a bit easier to swallow" for the general MCU audience.

Merrill Barr of Forbes thought that by not only introducing the Inhumans ahead of the film, but by depicting the spreading of the race throughout the world, was part of the series cementing its "right to exist" apart from the films. Talking about the season finale, Barr said, "S.H.I.E.L.D. does a most excellent job of standing on its own two feet in a way we've never seen it do before. Come the final frame, all anyone – Marvel fan or otherwise – will be asking is when season three begins. The note the show leaves viewers on is one that will make them realize, perhaps for the first time, that the journey of Agents of S.H.I.E.L.D. is not only worth it now, but perhaps always has been."

=== Accolades ===
Year	Award	Category	Nominee(s)	Result	Ref.
2015	People's Choice Awards	Favorite Network Sci-Fi/Fantasy TV Show	Agents of S.H.I.E.L.D.	Nominated	
2015	Visual Effects Society Awards	Outstanding Visual Effects in a Broadcast Program	Agents of S.H.I.E.L.D.	Nominated	
2015	Kids' Choice Awards	Favorite Family TV Show	Agents of S.H.I.E.L.D.	Nominated	
2015	Kids' Choice Awards	Favorite TV Actress	Chloe Bennet	Nominated	
2015	Saturn Award	Best Superhero Adaptation Television Series	Agents of S.H.I.E.L.D.	Nominated	
2015	PRISM Awards	Television Drama Multi-Episode Storyline – Mental Health	Fitz's storyline from "Shadows" to "The Things We Bury"	Nominated	
2015	Teen Choice Awards	Choice Fantasy/Sci-Fi Series	Agents of S.H.I.E.L.D.	Nominated	
2015	Primetime Creative Arts Emmy Awards	Outstanding Special and Visual Effects	"The Dirty Half Dozen"	Nominated	
2016	Irish Film & Television Awards	Best Actress in a Supporting Role in Drama Television	Ruth Negga	Nominated	
