= The Frenemy of My Enemy =

- Agents of S.H.I.E.L.D. episode
- "The Art of Evolution" poster for the episode.
- Episode no.: Season 2 Episode 18
- Directed by: Karen Gaviola
- Written by: Monica Owusu-Breen; Paul Zbyszewski
- Cinematography by: Allan Westbrook
- Editing by: Eric Litman
- Original air date: April 21, 2015
- Running time: 43 minutes

Guest appearances
- Kyle MacLachlan as Calvin Zabo; Henry Simmons as Alphonso "Mack" Mackenzie; Dichen Lachman as Jiaying; J. August Richards as Mike Peterson / Deathlok; Luke Mitchell as Lincoln Campbell; Jamie Harris as Gordon; Simon Kassianides as Sunil Bakshi; Maya Stojan as Kara Palamas / Agent 33; Henry Goodman as List; Kris Lemche as Ethan Johnston

Episode chronology
← Previous "Melinda"	Next → "The Dirty Half Dozen"
- Agents of S.H.I.E.L.D. season 2

"The Frenemy of My Enemy" is the eighteenth episode of the second season of the American television series Agents of S.H.I.E.L.D. Based on the Marvel Comics organization S.H.I.E.L.D., it follows Phil Coulson and his team of S.H.I.E.L.D. agents as they must make a deal with former agent and traitor Grant Ward. It is set in the Marvel Cinematic Universe (MCU) and acknowledges the franchise's films. The episode was written by Monica Owusu-Breen and Paul Zbyszewski, and directed by Karen Gaviola.

Clark Gregg reprises his role as Coulson from the film series, and is joined by series regulars Ming-Na Wen, Brett Dalton as Ward, Chloe Bennet, Iain De Caestecker, Elizabeth Henstridge, Nick Blood, and Adrianne Palicki.

"The Frenemy of My Enemy" originally aired on ABC on April 21, 2015, and according to Nielsen Media Research, was watched by 4.45 million viewers.

== Plot ==
Determined to learn what Phil Coulson has been planning, Melinda May orders Jemma Simmons to open the toolbox, forcing her to admit it is a fake. In order to protect Simmons from the council, May claims Leo Fitz was entirely to blame, angering Simmons. Coulson, Mike Peterson and Lance Hunter rescue Fitz, and later apprehend Grant Ward and Kara Palamas in Tijuana. Coulson offers to erase Ward's memories and give him a new identity if he leads them to Wolfgang Von Strucker, and though he accepts, Ward confides in Palamas that he has no intention of losing his memories and is only allying with Coulson to further their own plans. Ward and Palamas share a passionate kiss in front of Coulson. Afterwards, Ward provides Coulson with the services of a brainwashed Sunil Bakshi, who arranges a meeting with List, whom they hope will lead them to Strucker. Bakshi offers Mike to List as a gift, as Strucker and List have been experimenting on superhumans.

Jiaying has Gordon bring Cal back to his former office in Milwaukee, under the pretense that he is on a simple excursion to collect his belongings, but the Inhumans intend to abandon him there. Skye goes with him to make sure he doesn't hurt anyone, and Jiaying sends Lincoln Campbell to spy on them, to make sure Skye is safe. List's scientists detect Gordon's appearance in Milwaukee, as they have been scanning for his teleportation, which leaves a quantum entanglement signature. List, Bakshi and Mike travel to Milwaukee, while Coulson, Ward, Fitz, Hunter and Palamas follow in their quinjet.

Skye calls May, hoping S.H.I.E.L.D. can apprehend Cal, and May sends Bobbi Morse and Alphonso "Mack" Mackenzie. Cal is livid when he discovers Lincoln and realizes the Inhumans plan to abandon him. Hydra attacks them, and Lincoln fights Mike, before each realizes the other is a friend of Skye. Coulson, Ward, Hunter and Palamas enter the fray, and Hunter is soon wounded. Simmons hacks into Mike's camera feed and sees Coulson and Ward working together, before Hydra subdue and remove Mike and Lincoln. Skye almost reaches Coulson and Ward, but Gordon arrives and takes her and Cal back to Afterlife at the last moment. Morse and Mack arrive at Cal's office and find Coulson, who surrenders.

== Production ==
=== Development ===
In March 2015, Marvel announced that the eighteenth episode of the season would be titled "The Frenemy of My Enemy", to be written by Monica Owusu-Breen and Paul Zbyszewski, with Karen Gaviola directing.

=== Writing ===
Executive producer Jeffrey Bell explained "The Frenemy of My Enemy"'s place in the overarching story of the season, saying that it "really sets up nicely the final four, which I think kind of move like a train. If you had gone to see a 22 hour movie, this sort of launches us into act three, where everything starts coming together. So we've got S.H.I.E.L.D. 2.0, and we've got Hydra, and we've got Inhumans, and we've got Ward, and we've got all those different threads. And we're starting to put those together in new combinations in new ways, and that will propel us into the last four episodes."

=== Casting ===
In March 2015, Marvel revealed that main cast members Clark Gregg, Ming-Na Wen, Brett Dalton, Chloe Bennet, Iain De Caestecker, Elizabeth Henstridge, Nick Blood, and Adrianne Palicki would star as Phil Coulson, Melinda May, Grant Ward, Skye, Leo Fitz, Jemma Simmons, Lance Hunter, and Bobbi Morse, respectively. It was also revealed that the guest cast for the episode would include Henry Simmons as Alphonso "Mack" Mackenzie, Henry Goodman as Dr. List, Kyle MacLachlan as Cal, Jamie Harris as Gordon, Maya Stojan as Kara Palamas, Dichen Lachman as Jiaying, Luke Mitchell as Lincoln Campbell, Kris Lemche as Ethan, Staci Roberts as Paula, and Trenton Rostedt as Hoodie Guy. Roberts and Rostedt did not receive guest star credit in the episode. Simon Kassianides and J. August Richards also guest star as Sunil Bakshi and Deathlok, respectively. Simmons, Goodman, MacLachlan, Harris, Stojan, Lachman, Mitchell, Lemche, Kassianides, and Richards reprise their roles from earlier in the series.

== Release ==
=== Broadcast ===
"The Frenemy of My Enemy" was first aired in the United States on ABC on April 21, 2015.

=== Marketing ===
For the final twelve episodes of the season Marvel once again ran the "Art of..." initiative, in which an image was released the Thursday before the episode aired, depicting a first look at a key event from the upcoming episode, with the season's title being "The Art of Evolution". The different artists were once again chosen to create the teaser posters, based on their previous work and how it connected to the themes and emotion of the intended episode. Marvel teamed with Nathan Fox on the poster for "The Frenemy of My Enemy", which depicts Ward, Kara, and Bakshi in "Hydra red"; Coulson, Hunter, and Fitz in "S.H.I.E.L.D. blue"; and Deathlok neutral. They are all featured together, just as the season is pulling together all of its different plotlines.

=== Home media ===
The episode began streaming on Netflix on June 11, 2015, and was released along with the rest of the second season on September 18, 2015, on Blu-ray and DVD. The episode, along with the rest of the series, was removed from Netflix on February 28, 2022, and later became available on Disney+ on March 16, 2022.

== Reception ==
=== Ratings ===
In the United States the episode received a 1.6/5 percent share among adults between the ages of 18 and 49, meaning that it was seen by 1.6 percent of all households, and 5 percent of all of those watching television at the time of the broadcast. It was watched by 4.45 million viewers.
