= Making Friends and Influencing People =

- Agents of S.H.I.E.L.D. episode
- Episode no.: Season 2 Episode 3
- Directed by: Bobby Roth
- Written by: Monica Owusu-Breen
- Cinematography by: Feliks Parnell
- Editing by: Joshua Charson
- Original air date: October 7, 2014
- Running time: 43 minutes

Guest appearances
- B. J. Britt as Antoine Triplett; Reed Diamond as Daniel Whitehall; Henry Simmons as Alphonso "Mack" Mackenzie; Simon Kassianides as Sunil Bakshi; Maya Stojan as Agent 33; Dylan Minnette as Donnie Gill; Adam Kulbersh as Kenneth Turgeon

Episode chronology
← Previous "Heavy Is the Head"	Next → "Face My Enemy"
- Agents of S.H.I.E.L.D. season 2

"Making Friends and Influencing People" is the third episode of the second season of the American television series Agents of S.H.I.E.L.D. Based on the Marvel Comics organization S.H.I.E.L.D., it follows Phil Coulson and his team of S.H.I.E.L.D. agents as they fight Hydra for control of a superhuman. It is set in the Marvel Cinematic Universe (MCU) and acknowledges the franchise's films. The episode was written by Monica Owusu-Breen, and directed by Bobby Roth.

Clark Gregg reprises his role as Coulson from the film series, and is joined by principal cast members Ming-Na Wen, Brett Dalton, Chloe Bennet, Iain De Caestecker, Elizabeth Henstridge, and Nick Blood. The idea of brainwashing plays a significant part in the episode, and is brought over from the films.

"Making Friends and Influencing People" originally aired on ABC on October 7, 2014, and according to Nielsen Media Research, was watched by 4.47 million viewers in its original airing. The episode received a positive critical response, with the performance of De Caestecker praised, and the rom-com sequence featuring the character of Simmons also highlighted.

== Plot ==
Hydra leader Daniel Whitehall attempts to brainwash the captured Agent 33 of S.H.I.E.L.D., while Hydra is also searching for Donnie Gill, who has cryokinetic abilities. S.H.I.E.L.D. Agent Jemma Simmons, a mole for S.H.I.E.L.D. inside Hydra, informs S.H.I.E.L.D. Director Phil Coulson of this, who has so far told only Agent Melinda May about Simmons's current whereabouts. May, meanwhile, is training Agent Skye to keep control whilst in the field. When Gill is approached by Hydra agents while hiding out in Marakech, Morocco, he decides to retaliate, freezing a Hydra frigate in Casablanca, Morocco, in hopes of gaining Hydra's attention. Former S.H.I.E.L.D. Agent and Hydra mole Grant Ward, now a S.H.I.E.L.D. prisoner with no loyalties to Hydra, tells Skye that Hydra has a way of "convincing" people to join them. Coulson sends a team of agents to recruit Gill, hoping to reach him before Hydra does. Whitehall also sends a team of agents to recruit Gill, with high-level agent Sunil Bakshi taking Simmons with them to test her loyalties, and to take advantage of her previous short-lived association with Gill. (Note: As seen in "Seeds".)

With many of the S.H.I.E.L.D. agents gone, Agent Leo Fitz investigates where Skye gets her Hydra information from, finding Ward, who severely injured Fitz's brain previously, leaving Fitz with communication and memory issues. Though Ward tries to explain himself, Fitz wishes for Ward to experience the same feeling, so he drains the oxygen from Ward's cell. However, Fitz relents when Ward explains that Gill had already been brainwashed by Hydra once, and that they would be looking to simply re-trigger it. Simmons finds Gill, and unknowingly begins to re-trigger his brainwashing, though she is interrupted by the arrival of the S.H.I.E.L.D. team. Simmons leads Gill to Bakshi, who completes the re-triggering, and orders Gill to freeze all the S.H.I.E.L.D. agents. Skye, having learned from Fitz that Gill was under Hydra control, shoots Gill from a sniper position, apparently killing him and sending his freezing body into the ocean. Hydra leaves, with Bakshi now much more trusting of Simmons, while S.H.I.E.L.D. claims the Hydra cargo left behind. Whitehall, having successfully brainwashed Agent 33, muses to Bakshi that S.H.I.E.L.D. is becoming a problem for Hydra.

In an end tag, Ward tells Skye that her father is alive and that Ward will take her to him one day. Skye is troubled by this statement, causing her heart rate to spike.

== Production ==
=== Development ===
In September 2014, Marvel announced that the third episode of the season would be titled "Making Friends and Influencing People", to be written by Monica Owusu-Breen, with Bobby Roth directing.

=== Casting ===
In September 2014, Marvel revealed that main cast members Clark Gregg, Ming-Na Wen, Chloe Bennet, Iain De Caestecker, Elizabeth Henstridge, and Nick Blood would star as Phil Coulson, Melinda May, Skye, Leo Fitz, Jemma Simmons, and Lance Hunter, respectively. It was also revealed that the guest cast for the episode would include Henry Simmons as Alphonso "Mack" Mackenzie, Reed Diamond as Daniel Whitehall, Dylan Minnette as Donnie Gill, Simon Kassianides as Sunil Bakshi, Adam Kulbersh as Kenneth Turgeon, Maya Stojan as Agent 33, David Diaan as Elias, Jarrod Crawford as Lead Hydra Agent, Nicholas Roth as Second Hydra Agent, Mo Darwiche as Ship's Captain, and Jesse D. Goins as Theo. However, Diaan, Crawford, Roth, Darwiche, and Goins did not receive guest star credit in the episode. Though he was not officially announced by Marvel, B. J. Britt also guest stars as Antoine Triplett. Simmons, Diamond, Minette, Kassianides, and Britt all reprise their roles from earlier in the series.

=== Marvel Cinematic Universe tie-ins ===
Hydra's ability to brainwash people, referred to in this episode as the Faustus Method, was first introduced to the MCU in the film Captain America: The Winter Soldier, and foreshadowed the character's appearance, as Johann Fennhoff, in the first season of Agent Carter, played by Ralph Brown.

== Release ==
=== Broadcast ===
"Making Friends and Influencing People" was first aired in the United States on ABC on October 7, 2014. It was aired alongside the US broadcast in Canada on CTV.

=== Home media ===
The episode began streaming on Netflix on June 11, 2015, and was released along with the rest of the second season on September 18, 2015, on Blu-ray and DVD. The episode, along with the rest of the series, was removed from Netflix on February 28, 2022, and later became available on Disney+ on March 16, 2022.

== Reception ==
=== Ratings ===
In the United States the episode received a 1.6/5 percent share among adults between the ages of 18 and 49, meaning that it was seen by 1.6 percent of all households, and 5 percent of all of those watching television at the time of the broadcast. It was watched by 4.47 million viewers. The Canadian broadcast gained 2.68 million viewers, the second highest for that day, and the fourth highest for the week.

=== Critical response ===
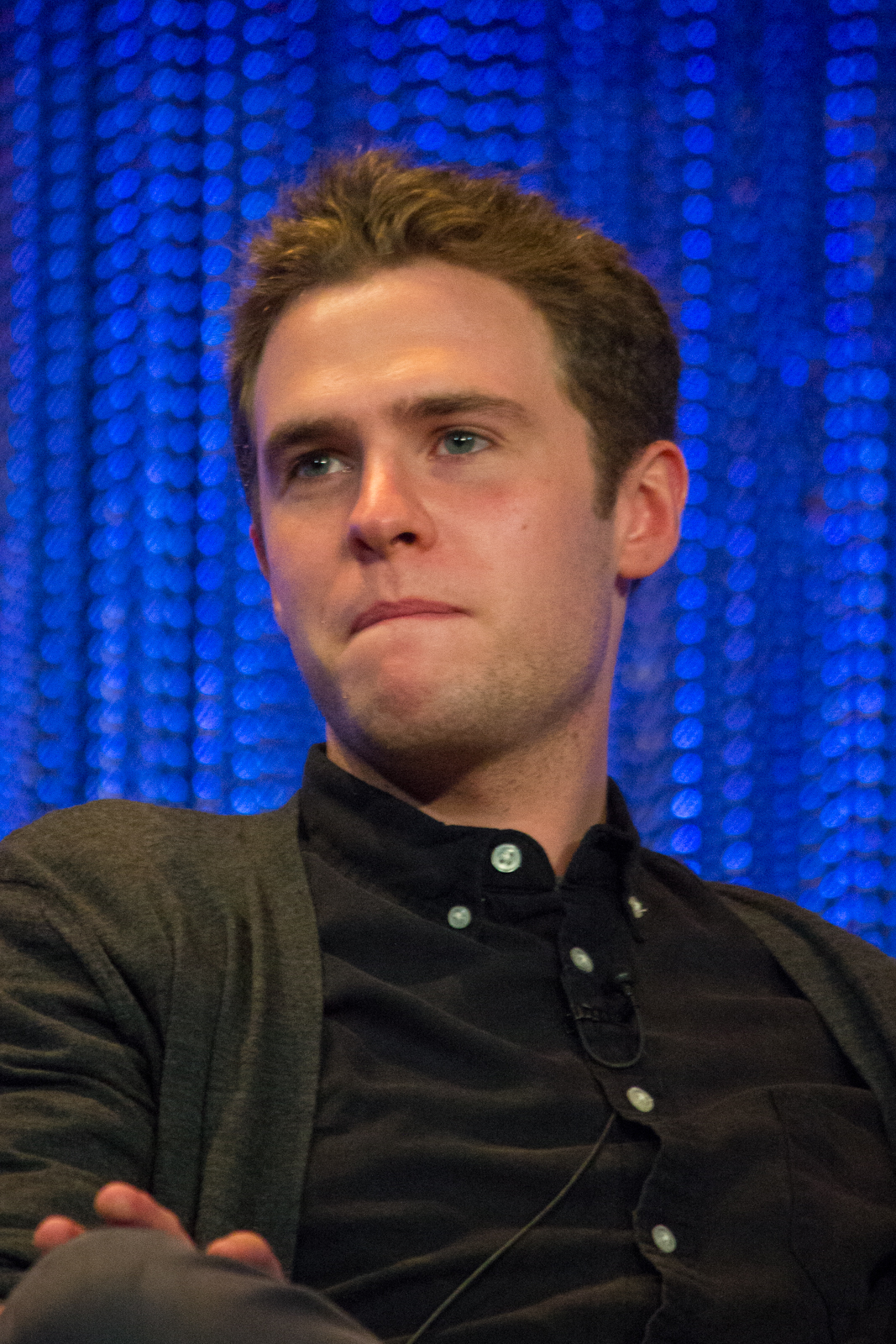
Iain De Casetecker's performance in the episode was praised by critics.

Eric Goldman of IGN scored the episode an 8.5 out of 10, indicating a "Great" episode, and praised continued improvements over the first season, including the quality of visual effects, and the changes in the main characters, particularly Fitz, with Goldman saying "Fitz was the character I had the toughest time with in S.H.I.E.L.D.'s initial episodes – the joke of him and Simmons being so similar wore thin very quickly and I had trouble seeing the point of the character. But this newly damaged Fitz is a truly tragic character its easy to sympathize with, and Iain De Caestecker was excellent and heartbreaking as Fitz showed how much Ward had hurt him". Goldman did criticize the character of Whitehall though, feeling that his casually evil manner didn't resonate as it was intended. Oliver Sava, writing for The A.V. Club, graded the episode a "B+", and positively compared the "breezy montage of Simmons' morning routine" to Alias, calling it "a bold stylistic choice [that] could help Agents Of S.H.I.E.L.D. break out of its generic aesthetic." He praised the separation and subsequent development of the characters of Fitz and Simmons, and highlighted De Caestecker's performance as the former. Joseph McCabe at Nerdist responded positively to the focus on characters and their relationships with/ similarities to others, especially Fitz and Simmons, and he highlighted De Caestecker's performance in the episode as "heartbreaking as he expresses the severity of the struggle in Fitz's mind and heart."

Alan Sepinwall of HitFix was positive about the Fitz and Simmons storylines, especially Simmons' ("Simmons going deep undercover with Hydra ... is a much better use of her than as Fitz's cheerleader"), but felt too much emphasis was put on Skye and her relationship to Ward, as well as overarching mysteries. He also stated that "Simmons' undercover work featured two of the more visually striking sequences from a show that's usually pretty bland on that front: the rom-com montage of Simmons getting ready for work — scored to "God Help the Girl" — and Simmons being led down a seemingly endless white Hydra corridor". Kevin Fitzpatrick, for ScreenCrush, positively called the episode "the third act of a three-episode premiere for the series, organically picking up any lingering threads of the first two episodes, yet still managing to course-correct from a few weaker aspects last season." He was positive of the roles that the characters Simmons, Fitz, Ward, and Gill played in the episode, found the use of the other characters "refreshing" as they were kept "in play with C-stories that succeeded without pulling focus", and praised the performances of De Caestecker and Dalton in particular. Rob Leane of Den of Geek summarized the episode by saying "a good fun super-powered romp was played, plot points were moved forward, and characters were developed." Feeling it brought the series "back on track", and calling De Caestecker's performance "Particularly impressive". Other aspects of the episode he praised include the humor, visual effects, and the handling of overarching storylines, while he called the Simmons "rom-com" sequence "one of the episode's manifold neat visual moments."
