= Love in the Time of Hydra =

- Agents of S.H.I.E.L.D. episode
- "The Art of Evolution" poster for the episode.
- Episode no.: Season 2 Episode 14
- Directed by: Jesse Bochco
- Written by: Brent Fletcher
- Cinematography by: Feliks Parnell
- Editing by: David Crabtree
- Original air date: March 24, 2015
- Running time: 43 minutes

Guest appearances
- Adrian Pasdar as Glenn Talbot; Henry Simmons as Alphonso "Mack" Mackenzie; Maya Stojan as Kara Palamas / Agent 33; Simon Kassianides as Sunil Bakshi; Kirk Acevedo as Tomas Calderon; Christine Adams as Anne Weaver; Edward James Olmos as Robert Gonzales

Episode chronology
← Previous "One of Us"	Next → "One Door Closes"
- Agents of S.H.I.E.L.D. season 2

"Love in the Time of Hydra" is the fourteenth episode of the second season of the American television series Agents of S.H.I.E.L.D. Based on the Marvel Comics organization S.H.I.E.L.D., it follows Phil Coulson and his team of S.H.I.E.L.D. agents as they deal with Skye's new abilities, while Lance Hunter learns of a new S.H.I.E.L.D. faction, and Grant Ward reappears with the unpredictable Agent 33. It is set in the Marvel Cinematic Universe (MCU) and acknowledges the franchise's films. The episode was written by Brent Fletcher, and directed by Jesse Bochco.

Clark Gregg reprises his role as Coulson from the film series, and is joined by series regulars Ming-Na Wen, Brett Dalton, Chloe Bennet, Iain De Caestecker, Elizabeth Henstridge, Nick Blood, and Adrianne Palicki. Maya Stojan guest stars Agent 33, while recurring guest star Edward James Olmos is introduced.

"Love in the Time of Hydra" originally aired on ABC on March 24, 2015, and according to Nielsen Media Research, was watched by 4.29 million viewers.

== Plot ==
Former S.H.I.E.L.D. Agent 33 was brainwashed by Hydra leader Daniel Whitehall, electrocuted while wearing a nano mask that disguised her as S.H.I.E.L.D. agent Melinda May, and now permanently looks like May, but with a large scar and distorted voice. When Whitehall was killed by S.H.I.E.L.D. Director Phil Coulson, Agent 33 ran away with former Hydra agent and S.H.I.E.L.D. mole, but now free agent, Grant Ward. The two of them kidnap the inventor of the nano mask, who does his best to repair 33's, leaving her with the ability to either turn off the mask, or transform it into the appearance of anyone she sees, though turning it off means revealing the scar, and turning it on gives her May's voice. Using this technology, 33 and Ward infiltrate the US Air Force base of Brigadier General Glenn Talbot and break out former high-ranking Hydra operative Sunil Bakshi, who had captured 33 for Whitehall originally.

Agent Alphonso "Mack" Mackenzie introduces Lance Hunter to the leaders of "the real S.H.I.E.L.D.", an organization formed by S.H.I.E.L.D. agents who mistrusted former director Nick Fury's secrets, and who fear the potential harm caused by Coulson being resurrected by Fury using alien DNA, and Agent Skye having developed incredible abilities thanks to contact with an alien substance. They don't want Coulson, whose behavior they call "troubling" since his resurrection, to be in charge of S.H.I.E.L.D. Hunter's ex-wife, the Agent Bobbi Morse, agrees that Coulson "has been compromised". Morse later attempts to apologize to Hunter for not telling him about the other S.H.I.E.L.D., as they had recently been rekindling their relationship and then allows him to escape. Agent Anne Weaver calculates that it will take Hunter 12 hours to reach land from the aircraft carrier that serves as their base, and Morse says that it will take only 6 hours for her to take Coulson's base.

Unaware of everything that is happening, Coulson takes Skye to a safe house after May admits that Skye should be removed from S.H.I.E.L.D. Coulson gives Skye a pair of gloves designed by Agent Jemma Simmons that are intended to negate her abilities, which create earthquakes. Coulson explains to her that though she may have new powers, she is still the same person to him. He then returns to S.H.I.E.L.D., leaving Skye to adjust to her new status quo.

In an end tag, 33 and Ward learn of her past, including that her name is Kara, before brainwashing Bakshi themselves.

== Production ==
=== Development ===
In March 2015, Marvel announced that the fourteenth episode of the season would be titled "Love in the Time of Hydra", to be written by Brent Fletcher, with Jesse Bochco directing.

=== Casting ===
In March 2015, Marvel revealed that main cast members Clark Gregg, Ming-Na Wen, Brett Dalton, Chloe Bennet, Iain De Caestecker, Elizabeth Henstridge, Nick Blood, and Adrianne Palicki would star as Phil Coulson, Melinda May, Grant Ward, Skye, Leo Fitz, Jemma Simmons, Lance Hunter, and Bobbi Morse, respectively. It was also revealed that the guest cast for the episode would include Henry Simmons as Alphonso "Mack" Mackenzie, Adrian Pasdar as Brigadier General Glenn Talbot, Edward James Olmos as Robert Gonzales, Christine Adams as Agent Anne Weaver, Kirk Acevedo as Agent Tomas Calderon, Mark Allan Stewart as Agent Oliver, Simon Kassianides as Sunil Bakshi, Raquel Gardner as Carla Talbot, Maya Stojan as Agent 33, Landall Goolsby as Selwyn, Gigi Bermingham as Rhonda, Scott Speiser as station guard, Parisa Fakhri as Lieutenant Decker, Anna Campbell as female major, Shannon McClung as short officer, Meredith Bishop as Officer Anderson and Kieren van den Blink as female Lieutenant. Stewart, Gardner, Goolsby, Bermingham, Speiser, Fakhri, Campbell, McClung, Bishop, and Van Den Blink did not receive guest star credit in the episode. Simmons, Pasdar, Adams, Kassianides, and Stojan reprise their roles from earlier in the series.

== Release ==
=== Broadcast ===
"Love in the Time of Hydra" was first aired in the United States on ABC on March 24, 2015.

=== Marketing ===
For the final twelve episodes of the season Marvel once again ran the "Art of..." initiative, in which an image was released the Thursday before the episode aired, depicting a first look at a key event from the upcoming episode, with the season's title being "The Art of Evolution". The different artists were once again chosen to create the teaser posters, based on their previous work and how it connected to the themes and emotions of the intended episode. Annie Wu was brought on for the "Love in the Time of Hydra" poster, which shows Grant Ward holding a woman, though depicts her as two; one drawn in red, the other in blue – "half of that goes to Agent 33, who has two faces... And it also goes to the fact that she's been imitating other people as she did with Agent May."

=== Home media ===
The episode began streaming on Netflix on June 11, 2015, and was released along with the rest of the second season on September 18, 2015, on Blu-ray and DVD. The episode, along with the rest of the series, was removed from Netflix on February 28, 2022, and later became available on Disney+ on March 16, 2022.

== Reception ==
=== Ratings ===
In the United States, the episode received a 1.5/5 percent share among adults between the ages of 18 and 49, meaning that it was seen by 1.5 percent of all households and 5 percent of all of those watching television at the time of the broadcast. It was watched by 4.29 million viewers.
