= Face My Enemy =

- Agents of S.H.I.E.L.D. episode
- The climactic fight scene between Melinda May and Agent 33—both portrayed by Ming-Na Wen with CGI used to superimpose Wen's face on a stunt double—was praised as the best action sequence of the series by many critics.
- Episode no.: Season 2 Episode 4
- Directed by: Kevin Tancharoen
- Written by: Drew Z. Greenberg
- Cinematography by: Feliks Parnell
- Editing by: David Crabtree
- Original air date: October 14, 2014
- Running time: 41 minutes

Guest appearances
- B. J. Britt as Antoine Triplett; Reed Diamond as Daniel Whitehall; Henry Simmons as Alphonso "Mack" Mackenzie; Simon Kassianides as Sunil Bakshi; Ruth Negga as Raina; Maya Stojan as Agent 33; Adrian Pasdar as Glenn Talbot; Diego Serrano as Gabriel Soto; Roberto Medina as a bishop; Christian Barillas as a priest

Episode chronology
← Previous "Making Friends and Influencing People"	Next → "A Hen in the Wolf House"
- Agents of S.H.I.E.L.D. season 2

"Face My Enemy" is the fourth episode of the second season of the American television series Agents of S.H.I.E.L.D. Based on the Marvel Comics organization S.H.I.E.L.D., it follows Phil Coulson and his team of S.H.I.E.L.D. agents as they fight Hydra for control of a mysterious painting. It is set in the Marvel Cinematic Universe (MCU) and acknowledges the franchise's films. The episode was written by Drew Z. Greenberg, and directed by Kevin Tancharoen.

Clark Gregg reprises his role as Coulson from the film series, and is joined by principal cast members Ming-Na Wen, Brett Dalton, Chloe Bennet, Iain De Caestecker, Elizabeth Henstridge, and Nick Blood. Guest star Maya Stojan reprises her role as Agent 33, before being replaced by Wen when the character takes on the appearance of the latter's character Melinda May. This leads to the climactic fight between both of Wen's characters, realized through choreographed stunt work and CGI; the crew worked harder to meet the standards of Tancharoen following his acclaimed action work on Mortal Kombat: Legacy, including the stunt team, who had worked on that series, and the costume and set designers, who looked to accommodate the fight.

"Face My Enemy" originally aired on ABC on October 14, 2014, and according to Nielsen Media Research, was watched by 7.80 million viewers within a week of its release. The episode received a positive critical response, with Tancharoen's directing of the climactic action scene praised, along with the general character development throughout the episode.

== Plot ==
After the church Santa Maria de las Flores in Miami, Florida, was burnt down, the only remaining intact object, a 500-year-old painting, is discovered to have strange markings engraved on its back. The "Miracle Painting" is later set to be unveiled at a fundraising event for the church, which S.H.I.E.L.D. Director Phil Coulson and Agent Melinda May infiltrate with the help of Agents Lance Hunter, Skye, and Alphonso "Mack" Mackenzie. While undercover at the event, Coulson attempts to start a discussion with May about a contingency plan in case Coulson loses his mind after being injected with an alien substance. When they realize that Brigadier General Glenn Talbot is also at the event, Coulson attempts to negotiate with him before their cover is blown. Though Talbot seems to be willing to cooperate, Coulson decides go after the painting immediately.

Discovering that Talbot has already confiscated the painting, Coulson agrees to meet with him after debriefing his team. Meanwhile, May follows Talbot, who is actually Hydra agent Sunil Bakshi using advanced technology to take on Talbot's voice and appearance. May is attacked by Agent 33, a former S.H.I.E.L.D. agent brainwashed into Hydra's service, who knocks May unconscious and uses the same device to take on her voice and appearance. Agent 33 goes to the Bus, a S.H.I.E.L.D. plane being used as a mobile command center, where she secretly plants a computer virus before meeting with Coulson. Further discussing his contingency plan, in which May would kill Coulson and replace him as Director of S.H.I.E.L.D., Coulson deduces that Agent 33 is not May and turns on her; this draws the attention of Bakshi, who was ready to torture May to gain S.H.I.E.L.D. secrets.

Bakshi flees with the painting, with Coulson in pursuit, while May grapples with Agent 33. On the Bus, the virus starts destroying the plane's electrical systems, and it takes the mentally and socially impaired Agent Leo Fitz, along with Hunter, to stop it. Coulson knocks Bakshi unconscious and takes the painting while May defeats Agent 33. Afterwards, May reveals her own contingency plan – to take Coulson into the Australian Outback to hide away from civilization. He orders her to follow through with his plan instead.

In an end tag, Raina, en route to investigate the painting, is confronted by Daniel Whitehall, who gives her 48 hours to return the Obelisk to him or be killed.

== Production ==
=== Development ===
In September 2014, Marvel announced that the fourth episode of the season would be titled "Face My Enemy", to be written by Drew Z. Greenberg, with Kevin Tancharoen directing. It was originally titled "I Will Face My Enemy". The episode was the first of the series to be directed by Tancharoen, the brother of showrunner Maurissa Tancharoen.

=== Casting ===
In September 2014, Marvel revealed that main cast members Clark Gregg, Ming-Na Wen, Brett Dalton, Chloe Bennet, Iain De Caestecker, Elizabeth Henstridge, and Nick Blood would star as Phil Coulson, Melinda May, Grant Ward, Skye, Leo Fitz, Jemma Simmons, and Lance Hunter, respectively. It was also revealed that the guest cast for the episode would include Henry Simmons as "Alphonso "Mack" Mackenzie", Adrian Pasdar as Glenn Talbot, Simon Kassianides as Sunil Bakshi, Maya Stojan as Agent 33, Diego Serrano as Gabriel Soto, Lance Irwin as Guard, Isaac Montgomery as Guard #2, Alyce Tawil as Woman, Roberto Medina as Bishop, and Christian Barillas as Priest. However, Irwin, Montgomery, and Tawil did not receive guest star credit in the episode. Though they were not officially announced by Marvel, B. J. Britt, Ruth Negga, and Reed Diamond also guest star as Antoine Triplett, Raina, and Daniel Whitehall, respectively. Simmons, Pasdar, Kassianides, Stojan, Britt, Negga, and Diamond all reprise their roles from earlier in the series. Dalton does not ultimately appear in the episode. Ming-Na Wen replaces Stojan in portraying Agent 33 when the character takes on the appearance of Melinda May.

=== Design ===
==== Costumes ====
Concept art of the dress worn by Ming-Na Wen in the episode.

For the dress that Ming-Na Wen wears in the episode, costume designer Ann Foley had 10 days notice to make a dress that was appropriate for both dancing and fighting in. Duplicates also had to be made, for Maya Stojan and Wen's two stunt doubles. She explained that she "decided to do a wrap dress so that [Wen] could easily dance. It already had a slit sort of built into it, so that gave her freedom of movement. [The] goal is always to make sure that the actors are comfortable in their costumes, that they can move freely and do their stunts, and that nothing is too restrictive. And that they also look amazing at the same time." The dress also "needed long sleeves so that [Wen] could have pads on underneath the dress for when she was fighting. And then of course she's got the crazy fight where she's fighting herself...she needed serious freedom of movement in that dress, so we built panels that had stretch, and put them in several areas on her arms and her sides, so that it moved with her as she punched...herself."

==== Sets ====
Stunt coordinator Tanner Gill explained that the hotel in which the climactic fighting takes place was designed specifically with the fights in mind, saying "The basic environment of the fight had to be constructed to be "stunt friendly." The space was tailored. Each corner was rounded; surfaces were measured for height and size, then padded." Elaborating on this, fight choreographer Matt Mullins stated, "The main fight starts in a hallway, and then we move into a penthouse. Okay, we have a hallway and a penthouse—what can we do with that? Are we going to crash into some walls? Are we going to go into a kitchen? We see what we would get in terms of props, we take into consideration what the actors can do, move-wise—in our case, Ming-Na is exceptionally talented, so we can do a lot of different martial arts movement with her."

=== Filming ===
The episode, like the others in the series, was shot over eight days, with the "May vs. May" fight being shot over three of those days—one 16-hour day, a half-day, and a quarter-day. In preparation for the fight, both Wen and her stunt double Samantha Jo had to learn both May and Agent 33's actions, with Jo explaining that "Usually you only have to learn one side, so you can just drill that into your head and have that muscle memory and be good to go. But for this fight, for both Ming and myself, we had to learn both sides of the fight. And we knew on the day we were filming that we'd have to be changing our wardrobe back and forth. So we'd be going to one side of the fight, to the other side of the fight, back to the other side, and we just wanted to make sure we were safe about it. Because if we spaced out and started doing the other side again, we didn't want anyone to get hurt. So that's why we trained together. We were doing two sessions twice a week, anywhere from two to five hours at Ming's house just trying to get as physically ready and as mentally ready as possible. But thankfully, we'd already done so many episodes together by that point that we were super comfortable, and we know each other's body movements."

Mullins found that "To choreograph a fight is constantly trying to be open to doing things differently, and making things creative as possible. Any sequence that you ever do, it doesn't matter if it's two punches or 50 punches. The same amount of danger is always there. In order to make something look organic and real, the performers and stunt performers have got to punch each other as hard as they can ... Both of us—myself and Sam—we worked with Kevin [Tancharoen] on Mortal Kombat, so we knew the level that the director was wanting. So we both felt every piece had to be awesome, because he's known for putting together amazing sequences that are both unique and hard hitting." Jo also noted that "trying to come up with things people haven't seen before. There have been so many action movies and so many Marvel movies, you're constantly wanting to set the bar higher and higher. And it feels like the moves that are even possible just get narrower and narrower cause they've been done before." Tancharoen later reflected that "everyone really liked the May versus May fight", and so he and the stunt team would use it as a benchmark to overcome when designing action sequences for future episodes.

=== Visual effects ===
A major effect required throughout the episode was face replacements, especially during the "May vs. May" fight where it had to appear as if Wen was fighting herself. All the effects were completed in the two weeks between the filming and airing of the episode. Wen noted that "Kevin Tancharoen directed [the episode] and he's amazing with his directing with the Mortal Kombat series. So we had this really complicated sequence where we do this 360 and it reveals me and it reveals me again and there's no cut and you wonder how that happens in one of the fight sequences. And that's because they completely scanned and CGIed my face onto the stunt double. So there's a tremendous amount of work that went into the fight scenes and we did not have a lot of time to do it." She also elaborated that "On the day of, you have the set and you have the cameras, and you have to deal with special effects, because on top of everything else we had to scan my face and go through this incredible process of taking a million pictures so they were able to meld it onto Sam's face."

=== Marvel Cinematic Universe tie-ins ===
The technology Hydra uses to take on another's appearance and voice, referred to by the production team as a "nano mask", was introduced to the MCU in Captain America: The Winter Soldier, where it is used by the S.H.I.E.L.D. agent Natasha Romanoff.

== Release ==
=== Broadcast ===
"Face My Enemy" was first screened at New York Comic Con on October 10, 2014, before airing in the United States on ABC on October 14, 2014. It was aired alongside the US broadcast in Canada on CTV.

=== Home media ===
The episode began streaming on Netflix on June 11, 2015, and was released along with the rest of the second season on September 18, 2015, on Blu-ray and DVD. The episode, along with the rest of the series, was removed from Netflix on February 28, 2022, and later became available on Disney+ on March 16, 2022.

== Reception ==
=== Ratings ===
In the United States the episode received a 1.7/5 percent share among adults between the ages of 18 and 49, meaning that it was seen by 1.7 percent of all households, and 5 percent of all of those watching television at the time of the broadcast. It was watched by 4.7 million viewers. The Canadian broadcast gained 2.52 million viewers, the second highest for that day, and the sixth highest for the week. Within a week of its release, the episode was watched by 7.80 million U.S. viewers, above the season average of 7.09 million.

=== Critical response ===
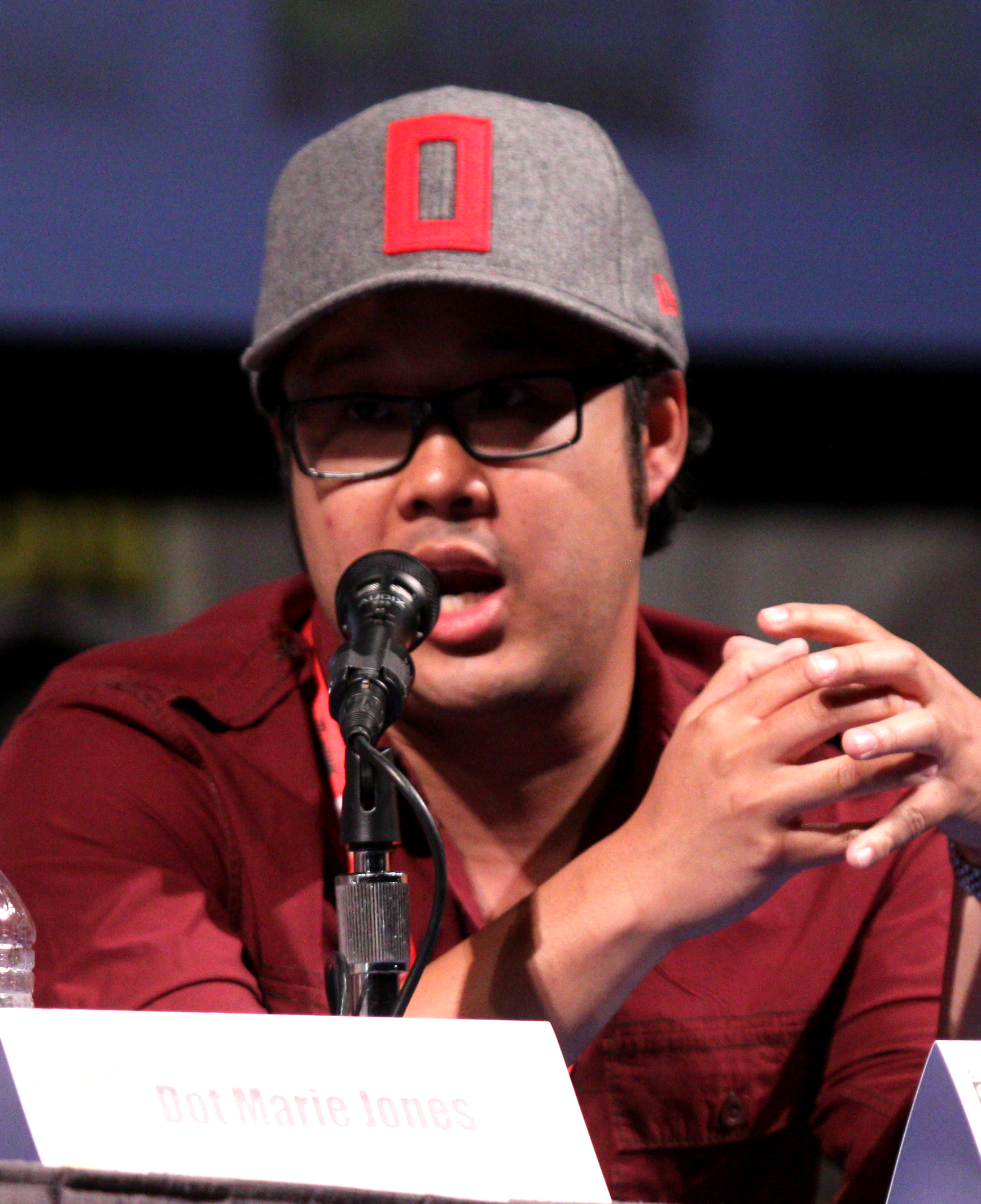
Kevin Tancharoen's direction of the episode's action sequences received praise from critics.

Eric Goldman of IGN gave the episode a score of 8.3 out of 10, indicating a "great" episode, praising the "May vs. May" fight as "the best fight scene this show has ever done", and noting Tancharoen's direction as well as the improved visual effects from the previous season used for the sequence. He also highlighted the character development for Fitz and Coulson, and found the end tag made Whitehall feel "truly menacing and powerful". Oliver Sava of The A.V. Club graded the episode a "B+", praising Tancharoen's direction and the "May vs. May" fight as "downright exhilarating", as well as the episode's focus on May and her relationship with Coulson. He did, however, criticize the Fitz subplot, calling it "forgettable" and predictable. Joseph McCabe, writing for Nerdist, positively compared the episode to the film To Catch a Thief and the series The Avengers, and called the "May vs. May" fight the highlight of the episode, action-wise. He also found the conclusion of Fitz's story in the episode to be "a bittersweet high". Alan Sepinwall of HitFix found the episode to deal with many elements the series was criticized for in the first season in a superior way, calling it "hoaky and retro", but saying "I don't much care, because the extended May vs. "May" brawl in and around the hotel room was such a treat."

Rob Leane, for Den of Geek, stated that "this week we continue to see the fallout of [Captain America: The Winter Soldier]'s revelations playing out in gleefully entertaining fashion ... we were treated to a twisty espionage-heavy thriller of an episode". Leane added that "by pitting May against her other self in a well-shot, thumpingly-scored fight sequence, new-to-S.H.I.E.L.D. director Kevin Tancharoen used his experience from Mortal Kombat: Legacy to highlight how far the action elements of the show have come since the early days." and also noted the development of multiple characters as positive. Kevin Fitzpatrick of ScreenCrush said "I had my trepidations about "Face My Enemy"'s cutesy-looking callbacks to more camp episodes and spy tropes, the kind you might expect from Chuck, back in the day. The hour certainly danced over that line here and there, what with May and Coulson's only means to recover an important artifact lying in a lavish party, the stock laser grid security alarm, May's mirror image fight, and other such throwback fare, but I'd say "Face My Enemy" ended up more of a celebratory self-aware subversion, rather than a sign of the season running out on empty just yet."
