= Afterlife (Agents of S.H.I.E.L.D.) =

- Agents of S.H.I.E.L.D. episode
- "The Art of Evolution" poster for the episode.
- Episode no.: Season 2 Episode 16
- Directed by: Kevin Hooks
- Written by: Craig Titley
- Cinematography by: Feliks Parnell
- Editing by: Joshua Charson
- Original air date: April 7, 2015
- Running time: 43 minutes

Guest appearances
- Kyle MacLachlan as Calvin Zabo; Henry Simmons as Alphonso "Mack" Mackenzie; Dichen Lachman as Jiaying; Jamie Harris as Gordon; Luke Mitchell as Lincoln Campbell; Ruth Negga as Raina; Stoney Westmoreland as Honest Eddie; Edward James Olmos as Robert Gonzales; J. August Richards as Mike Peterson / Deathlok

Episode chronology
← Previous "One Door Closes"	Next → "Melinda"
- Agents of S.H.I.E.L.D. season 2

"Afterlife" is the sixteenth episode of the second season of the American television series Agents of S.H.I.E.L.D. Based on the Marvel Comics organization S.H.I.E.L.D., it follows Phil Coulson and his team of S.H.I.E.L.D. agents as they face a rival faction of S.H.I.E.L.D. while Skye goes to Afterlife, a secret haven for people like her. It is set in the Marvel Cinematic Universe (MCU) and acknowledges the franchise's films. The episode was written by Craig Titley, and directed by Kevin Hooks.

Clark Gregg reprises his role as Coulson from the film series, and is joined by series regulars Ming-Na Wen, Brett Dalton, Chloe Bennet, Iain De Caestecker, Elizabeth Henstridge, Nick Blood, and Adrianne Palicki.

"Afterlife" originally aired on ABC on April 7, 2015, and according to Nielsen Media Research, was watched by 4.24 million viewers.

== Plot ==
S.H.I.E.L.D. Director Phil Coulson and new agent Lance Hunter travel to "The Retreat", a safe house where Coulson had left Agent Skye after she developed earthquake abilities. They see through surveillance footage that Skye had accidentally brought down a section of the forest when confronted by agents Bobbi Morse and Tomas Calderon, part of a faction of S.H.I.E.L.D. who do not follow Coulson, and are wary of the danger super-powered individuals possess. Calderon was seriously injured during the incident, and Skye had been promptly taken by a teleporting, eyeless man named Gordon.

Agent Robert Gonzales, another high-ranking member of the other S.H.I.E.L.D. faction, believes that Coulson may be amassing gifted people, but to make sure he needs the "toolbox" to be opened, something that Coulson had previously refused to do. Agent Leo Fitz also refuses, as he is loyal to Coulson, but Agent Jemma Simmons is convinced by Morse that uncovering any dangerous secrets is the only way to safeguard S.H.I.E.L.D., and return everything to "normal". Simmons begins working at opening the toolbox herself.

Skye awakens in a mountain hideaway with Chinese décor called Afterlife, which is a place where people like her are brought to be safe, and to be chosen/prepared for the transformation. As explained to her by Lincoln Campbell, her transitioner, she is a unique case in that she was transformed without being chosen or prepared, and that she did it in a Kree temple with a Diviner, rather than in the controlled environment and under the elders instruction. To her dismay, Campbell informs her that the transformation is irreversible, but he is confident that she can learn to master her abilities, as he once did – he can electrically charge anything, which first caused him to almost burn down Afterlife, but now allows him to do many things, including levitate objects. Skye asks Gordon to get a message to S.H.I.E.L.D., to let them know that she is alright, but he explains that he can't do anything without permission from the elders first. Gordon then visits Skye's father, Cal, who they have imprisoned. The two of them get into a fight when Gordon refuses to let Cal see Skye, but shortly after, Gordon brings Cal's wife, Jiaying, (Note: Jeffrey Bell explained in an interview with The Hollywood Reporter that Jiaying, who was murdered-by-dissection in the earlier episode "The Things We Bury", is still alive thanks to her husband Cal stitching her back together, which allowed her Inhuman healing factor to revive her.) who reiterates that he cannot see their daughter. Cal is too unpredictable and lacks discipline.

Coulson lures Gonzales's troops to "The Retreat", where he and Hunter attempt to steal their quinjet, but are outnumbered and captured. However, reinforcements arrive in the form of Agent Mike Peterson, a man turned into a super-powered cyborg by Hydra, who takes out the rival S.H.I.E.L.D. agents. This convinces Gonzales that Coulson is dangerous and needs to be taken down, but he wants him to be fairly represented on their S.H.I.E.L.D. board when he is brought in, so Gonzales offers Agent Melinda May a position on the board. When Fitz discovers that Simmons is helping them open the toolbox, the two argue about it, and Fitz decides to leave S.H.I.E.L.D. Coulson explains to Hunter that Peterson has been tracking Hydra scientist Dr. List for S.H.I.E.L.D., and has learned that they have interests in super-powered people like Skye. Coulson announces that in order to move forward they will need to work with the traitor Grant Ward.

Skye learns that Raina, the former Hydra operative who transformed alongside Skye, is in Afterlife as well, and confronts her, attempting to kill her. This is stopped by Jiaying, who offers to be her guide and help her master her abilities, if she chooses to stay, though she does not reveal that she is Skye's mother.

In an end tag, Simmons tells Morse and Mack that she is unable to open the toolbox without Coulson, but in reality she has given the real toolbox to Fitz, who is working with her against those not loyal to Coulson.

== Production ==
=== Development ===
In March 2015, Marvel announced that the sixteenth episode of the season would be titled "Afterlife", to be written by Craig Titley, with Kevin Hooks directing.

=== Writing ===
Concerning the introduction of Luke Mitchell as the Inhuman Lincoln Campbell, executive producer Jeffrey Bell stated that "Meeting Luke's character in the Inhuman world is just setting up a new dynamic. We're taking [Skye] into a group with a whole bunch of different people. So far, we've seen that there's a guy with no eyes, and there's a woman who now is covered in thorns. And as in the X-Men world, there are a handful of people who look more like them, but a lot of them turn out to be just attractive people with powers. And we thought, "Hey, let's have some of those as well!" We were looking for a new character to come on, and Luke just really impressed us. He was a good actor, had a nice quality, and we felt he might be a good person to sort of usher Skye into this other world."

=== Casting ===
In March 2015, Marvel revealed that main cast members Clark Gregg, Ming-Na Wen, Chloe Bennet, Iain De Caestecker, Elizabeth Henstridge, Nick Blood, and Adrianne Palicki would star as Phil Coulson, Melinda May, Skye, Leo Fitz, Jemma Simmons, Lance Hunter, and Bobbi Morse, respectively. It was also revealed that the guest cast for the episode would include Henry Simmons as Alphonso "Mack" Mackenzie, Ruth Negga as Raina, Kyle MacLachlan as Cal, Edward James Olmos as Robert Gonzales, Jamie Harris as Gordon, Dichen Lachman as Jiaying, Luke Mitchell as Lincoln Campbell, Craig Johnson as S.H.I.E.L.D. Leader, Stoney Westmoreland as Honest Eddie, and John Forest as Robbie. Johnson and Forest did not receive guest star credit in the episode. Simmons, Negga, MacLachlan, Olmos, Harris, and Lachman reprise their roles from earlier in the series. Main cast member Brett Dalton, who portrays Grant Ward in the series, does not appear in the episode. J. August Richards also guest stars, reprising his role of Mike Peterson / Deathlok from the first season.

== Release ==
=== Broadcast ===
"Afterlife" was first aired in the United States on ABC on April 7, 2015.

=== Marketing ===
For the final twelve episodes of the season Marvel once again ran the "Art of..." initiative, in which an image was released the Thursday before the episode aired, depicting a first look at a key event from the upcoming episode, with the season's title being "The Art of Evolution". The different artists were once again chosen to create the teaser posters, based on their previous work and how it connected to the themes and emotion of the intended episode. The poster for "Afterlife", by Dave Johnson, highlights the divide within S.H.I.E.L.D. and the alliances on each side. With Coulson in the middle, Agents Gonzales, Morse, Mackenzie and Weaver stem from the "real S.H.I.E.L.D.", while Hunter, Fitz and Simmons stem from the other.

=== Home media ===
The episode began streaming on Netflix on June 11, 2015, and was released along with the rest of the second season on September 18, 2015, on Blu-ray and DVD. The episode, along with the rest of the series, was removed from Netflix on February 28, 2022, and later became available on Disney+ on March 16, 2022.

== Reception ==
=== Ratings ===
In the United States the episode received a 1.5/5 percent share among adults between the ages of 18 and 49, meaning that it was seen by 1.5 percent of all households, and 5 percent of all of those watching television at the time of the broadcast. It was watched by 4.24 million viewers.

=== Critical response ===
IGN reviewer Eric Goldman gave the episode an 8.2 out of 10 "great" rating, saying "A lot continues to change on SHIELD, and I'm genuinely curious what the team dynamic will be like when this all plays out, which is a fun place for the show to be." He gave particular praise to the surprise character returns and Gonzalez's scene with May.
