= Who You Really Are =

- Agents of S.H.I.E.L.D. episode
- "The Art of Evolution" poster for the episode.
- Episode no.: Season 2 Episode 12
- Directed by: Roxann Dawson
- Written by: Drew Z. Greenberg
- Cinematography by: Allan Westbrook
- Editing by: Eric Litman
- Original air date: March 10, 2015
- Running time: 41 minutes

Guest appearances
- Jaimie Alexander as Sif; Henry Simmons as Alphonso "Mack" Mackenzie; Eddie McClintock as Vin-Tak

Episode chronology
← Previous "Aftershocks"	Next → "One of Us"
- Agents of S.H.I.E.L.D. season 2

"Who You Really Are" is the twelfth episode of the second season of the American television series Agents of S.H.I.E.L.D. Based on the Marvel Comics organization S.H.I.E.L.D., it follows Phil Coulson and his team of S.H.I.E.L.D. agents as they deal with an amnesiac Sif and revelations about the Kree and Inhumans. It is set in the Marvel Cinematic Universe (MCU) and acknowledges the franchise's films. The episode was written by Drew Z. Greenberg, and directed by Roxann Dawson.

Clark Gregg reprises his role as Coulson from the film series, and is joined by series regulars Ming-Na Wen, Brett Dalton, Chloe Bennet, Iain De Caestecker, Elizabeth Henstridge, Nick Blood, and Adrianne Palicki. Special guest star Jaimie Alexander portrays Sif, also reprising her role from the film series.

"Who You Really Are" originally aired on ABC on March 10, 2015, and according to Nielsen Media Research, was watched by 3.80 million viewers.

== Plot ==
In Faro, south Portugal, an amnesiac Sif emerges from the ocean looking for Kava. S.H.I.E.L.D. Director Phil Coulson has asked Lance Hunter to become part of the S.H.I.E.L.D. team permanently. His ex-wife, Agent Bobbi Morse, who he has been getting close to again, ponders what this will mean, as she is sharing a secret with Agent Alphonso "Mack" Mackenzie, who has been asked to take on missions in the field. The two of them discuss bringing Hunter into the loop, but Mack shuts down any chance of that happening and advises Bobbi to push Hunter away, which she does.

S.H.I.E.L.D. travel to Portugal and try to work with Sif to find out what she was doing on Earth, rather than Asgard. Through social media they discover footage of Sif fighting a surprisingly strong man whose weapon removed her memories. Sif had managed to damage the technology that he was wearing, which was fueled by nitrogen. Morse and Agent Skye track the man to the local hospital's nitrogen supply. He is using the technology to hide his blue skin – he is a Kree. In the ensuing fight, Morse is thrown across the room, while Skye loses control of her new and secret earthquake-powers, allowing the Kree to escape.

Sif remembers that Kava means "keys", which leads S.H.I.E.L.D. to the Romanic City of Chaves (English: Keys), in the north of Portugal, where Daniel Whitehall found the Obelisk, or the Diviner (which gave Skye her abilities) during the dictatorial regime sympathetic to the Nazi ideology Estado Novo. There, they capture the Kree and confiscate the crate he had dug up. The Kree, named Vin-Tak, cooperates by restoring Sif's memory and explaining his mission on Earth: he had learnt that Terrigenesis, the transformation of a human with special genetic material into a Kree war-slave, had recently taken place on Earth, and had come to put down the "abomination" and destroy the Diviners remaining on the planet. Panicking, Skye once again loses control, and everyone realises that she has been changed. Vin-Tak wants to kill her, while Sif wants to take her to Asgard for the safety of the human race, but Morse stops the former, removing his memory with his device, and Coulson convinces Sif to leave Skye be.

Skye, unable to stop the shaking, uses a tranquilizer on herself, and when she wakes up, moves into the vibranium-laced cage away from the other agents, who fear her new abilities. Sif returns Vin-Tak to his homeworld of Hala and promises that the Kree will no longer be an issue for Earth, though she warns Coulson that Skye may be even more dangerous than he thinks.

In an end tag, Hunter confronts Mack about him and Morse, forcing Mack to knock Hunter unconscious.

== Production ==
=== Development ===
In February 2015, Marvel announced that the twelfth episode of the season would be titled "Who You Really Are", to be written by Drew Z. Greenberg, with Roxann Dawson directing.

=== Writing ===
Concerning Simmons' apparent anger at learning that Skye has gained new abilities due to her exposure to alien materials, executive producer Jeffrey Bell explained that "The way everyone reacts to the situation is different, and different types of concern and different types of fear, and different types of determination...and I think all of our characters are reacting in very different ways to that, which is the whole point of doing it. When one of your best friends comes out as a superhero, how do you react to that? And just trying to find out, "Oh, my friend changed, they're different, and how do I feel about that? And this is cool, but it's scary, and I don't know how I feel about that. And it's wonderful, and why can't I have that? Or, I don't want that. Or, does Skye want that?" It just, to me, captures a whole bunch of questions, which is what we try to do."

On the title of the episode, Bell said "I think for all of us, "who you really are" is revealed in these kind of situations. Which side are you on, how do you feel about that, who do you stand with, how do you feel about that? So very much on point with that is Lady Sif, and one of the things on point with that is Skye, but one of the things that I think is nice about that title is it also reflects on the rest of the team as well."

=== Casting ===
In February 2015, Marvel revealed that main cast members Clark Gregg, Ming-Na Wen, Chloe Bennet, Iain De Caestecker, Elizabeth Henstridge, Nick Blood, and Adrianne Palicki would star as Phil Coulson, Melinda May, Skye, Leo Fitz, Jemma Simmons, Lance Hunter, and Bobbi Morse, respectively. It was also revealed that the guest cast for the episode would include Henry Simmons as Alphonso "Mack" Mackenzie, Jaimie Alexander as Sif, Eddie McClintock as Vin-Tak, Alexandra Manea as nurse, Lidia Porto as head nurse, Danny Lopes as Bruno, Ben Griesse as Tiago, Ruben Rabasa as Mr. Cardozo and Markell Andrew as officer Carvalho. Manea, Porto, Lopes, Griesse, Rabasa, and Andrew did not receive guest star credit in the episode. Simmons and Alexander reprise their roles from earlier in the series. Main cast member Brett Dalton, who portrays Grant Ward in the series, does not appear in the episode.

On returning to the series after a similar single-episode guest appearance in the first season, Alexander said "This definitely came out of the blue. It was a last minute thing. They called up and said, "Hey, would you like to come back on S.H.I.E.L.D.? We need you for something very specific." And I said ... "You know what? If this makes sense for my character in the film, then I'm going to say yes to this."

=== Marvel Cinematic Universe tie-ins ===
When Coulson and Mack are taking inventory at the start of the episode, Coulson mentions that they get equipment from Stark Industries via Maria Hill, the former a major company from the Iron Man films, the latter a S.H.I.E.L.D. agent who began working for Tony Stark at the end of Captain America: The Winter Soldier. The character of Vin-Tak is the first living Kree to appear on the series, after a Kree corpse was seen in the episode "T.A.H.I.T.I." The species plays a significant role in the film Guardians of the Galaxy, where the idea of more peaceful members of the race, like Vin-Tak, was established.

== Release ==
=== Broadcast ===
"Who You Really Are" was first aired in the United States on ABC on March 10, 2015.

=== Marketing ===
For the final twelve episodes of the season Marvel once again ran the "Art of..." initiative, in which an image was released the Thursday before the episode aired, depicting a first look at a key event from the upcoming episode, with the season's title being "The Art of Evolution". The different artists were once again chosen to create the teaser posters, based on their previous work and how it connected to the themes and emotion of the intended episode. For "Who You Really Are", the producers enlisted Marcos Martín to create the poster, which highlighted Sif's return to the show, as well as an "inside look" at S.H.I.E.L.D. as the logo crumbles, with Skye in the center of it, ambiguously leaving the viewer questioning if the logo was crumbling due to Sif's sword, or Skye's powers.

=== Home media ===
The episode began streaming on Netflix on June 11, 2015, and was released along with the rest of the second season on September 18, 2015, on Blu-ray and DVD. The episode, along with the rest of the series, was removed from Netflix on February 28, 2022, and later became available on Disney+ on March 16, 2022.

== Reception ==
=== Ratings ===
In the United States the episode received a 1.5/4 percent share among adults between the ages of 18 and 49, meaning that it was seen by 1.5 percent of all households, and 4 percent of all of those watching television at the time of the broadcast. It was watched by 3.80 million viewers.
