= One of Us (Agents of S.H.I.E.L.D.) =

- Agents of S.H.I.E.L.D. episode
- "The Art of Evolution" poster for the episode.
- Episode no.: Season 2 Episode 13
- Directed by: Kevin Tancharoen
- Written by: Monica Owusu-Breen
- Cinematography by: Feliks Parnell
- Editing by: Joshua Charson
- Original air date: March 17, 2015
- Running time: 43 minutes

Guest appearances
- Kyle MacLachlan as Calvin Zabo; Henry Simmons as Alphonso "Mack" Mackenzie; Drea de Matteo as Karla Faye Gideon; Jamie Harris as Gordon; Blair Underwood as Andrew Garner; Jeff Daniel Phillips as David A. Angar

Episode chronology
← Previous "Who You Really Are"	Next → "Love in the Time of Hydra"
- Agents of S.H.I.E.L.D. season 2

"One of Us" is the thirteenth episode of the second season of the American television series Agents of S.H.I.E.L.D. Based on the Marvel Comics organization S.H.I.E.L.D., it follows Phil Coulson and his team of S.H.I.E.L.D. agents as they face several "gifted" criminals, led by the vengeful Cal. It is set in the Marvel Cinematic Universe (MCU) and acknowledges the franchise's films. The episode was written by Monica Owusu-Breen, and directed by Kevin Tancharoen.

Clark Gregg reprises his role as Coulson from the film series, and is joined by series regulars Ming-Na Wen, Brett Dalton, Chloe Bennet, Iain De Caestecker, Elizabeth Henstridge, Nick Blood, and Adrianne Palicki. Recurring guest star Kyle MacLachlan portrays Cal.

"One of Us" originally aired on ABC on March 17, 2015, and according to Nielsen Media Research, was watched by 4.34 million viewers.

== Plot ==
Cal recruits several "gifted" individuals listed on S.H.I.E.L.D.'s Index who all have grievances against S.H.I.E.L.D., and together they break out David A. Angar from a S.H.I.E.L.D. secure facility. Angar's vocal cords were experimented on to the point that he can cause instant catatonia with a whisper. Though one of his recruits, Karla Faye Gideon, suggests forgetting S.H.I.E.L.D. and just running away to live new lives, Cal can't forget about his daughter, Skye, who was an agent of S.H.I.E.L.D., and has now developed abilities of her own. He has been developing a serum in the hopes of making himself stronger ever since S.H.I.E.L.D. had taken Skye and his wife had been killed, but results have been inconsistent, and now he hopes that he can stand against S.H.I.E.L.D. with the help of his new team.

Now that Skye has powers, S.H.I.E.L.D. Director Phil Coulson has put her on the Index. She needs a psychological analysis and threat assessment, so Coulson asks Agent Melinda May to contact her ex-husband, Dr. Andrew Garner, who consulted for S.H.I.E.L.D. previously. He agrees to help on the condition that Skye gets to see his report as well, as he is doing this for her, not S.H.I.E.L.D. May explains that that won't be a problem now that Coulson is in charge. Skye admits to Garner that she iced herself previously (Note: As shown in "Who You Really Are".) because she couldn't control her abilities, and that she was scared of losing her status as a S.H.I.E.L.D. agent, even having nightmares of being targeted by S.H.I.E.L.D. as she knows many Gifted individuals are.

Coulson and Agent Bobbi Morse investigate Angar's breakout, and track Cal and his team to Manitowoc, Wisconsin, where Coulson was born. At the local football stadium, Angar has induced catatonia in many local high school students, and Cal's team are standing watch over them, waiting for Coulson to arrive. Coulson calls May for backup, and rather than interfere in Garner's session with Skye, which is taking place in the cage on S.H.I.E.L.D.'s plane, May flies straight to Manitowoc with Skye and Garner on board. Coulson confronts Cal on the field as May arrives. When Cal sees Skye in S.H.I.E.L.D.'s clutches (May holds a gun to her) he points out how terribly S.H.I.E.L.D. treats Gifted people. Before he can do anything, however, Gordon teleports into the stadium and takes Cal away.

Coulson, Morse, and May subdue the rest of Cal's team, but as Skye witnesses the brutality S.H.I.E.L.D. uses against them, she loses control of her abilities again. As the stadium shakes, she tries to push her emotions aside as May has taught her, and as the shaking stops, she falls unconscious. Upon waking up, she learns that she had just directed her abilities inwards, causing hairline fractures up her arms. Garner recommends that Skye leave S.H.I.E.L.D. altogether, and notes to May that S.H.I.E.L.D. really hasn't changed, as she said it had, turning down an offer to stay on and consult. Meanwhile, Agent Alphonso "Mack" Mackenzie takes Lance Hunter as a prisoner to "the real S.H.I.E.L.D.", an organization that he and Morse are secretly working for.

In an end tag, Cal is enraged that Gordon didn't take Skye, who he feels should be saved from S.H.I.E.L.D. Gordon taunts Cal about being a "science experiment", rather than being born with his gifts like himself and Skye. Cal then goes to learn his fate from Gordon's superiors.

== Production ==
=== Development ===
In February 2015, Marvel announced that the thirteenth episode of the season would be titled "One of Us", to be written by Monica Owusu-Breen, with Kevin Tancharoen directing.

=== Writing ===
Executive producer Jeffrey Bell talked about the more episodic aspects of the episode, saying "This was a different episode for us. We're pretty serialized, and every now and then you want to find a way to take a little detour that keeps the emotional life of your story going, but you want to explore other corners. And this one really does that. We're spending a lot of time with Cal in this episode, and his friends ... it's a really fun episode. And there's a... not darker, but more of a gothic tone to it, if that makes sense."

=== Casting ===
In February 2015, Marvel revealed that main cast members Clark Gregg, Ming-Na Wen, Chloe Bennet, Iain De Caestecker, Elizabeth Henstridge, Nick Blood, and Adrianne Palicki would star as Phil Coulson, Melinda May, Skye, Leo Fitz, Jemma Simmons, Lance Hunter, and Bobbi Morse, respectively. It was also revealed that the guest cast for the episode would include Henry Simmons as Alphonso "Mack" Mackenzie, Kyle MacLachlan as Calvin Zabo, Jamie Harris as Gordon, Blair Underwood as Dr. Andrew Garner, Drea de Matteo as Karla Faye Gideon, Ric Sarabia as Wendell Levi, Geo Corvera as Francis Noche, Jeff Daniel Phillips as David A. Angar, Gregg Martin as student, Jack Kennedy as security guard and Jamal Duff as John Bruno. Sarabia, Corvera, Phillips, Martin, Kennedy, and Duff did not receive guest star credit in the episode. Simmons, MacLachlan, and Harris reprise their roles from earlier in the series. Main cast member Brett Dalton, who portrays Grant Ward in the series, does not appear in the episode.

=== Marvel Cinematic Universe tie-ins ===
Dr. Andrew Garner works at the West Virginia campus of Culver University. The Virginia campus appeared in The Incredible Hulk.

== Release ==
=== Broadcast ===
"One of Us" was first aired in the United States on ABC on March 17, 2015.

=== Marketing ===
For the final twelve episodes of the season Marvel once again ran the "Art of..." initiative, in which an image was released the Thursday before the episode aired, depicting a first look at a key event from the upcoming episode, with the season's title being "The Art of Evolution". The different artists were once again chosen to create the teaser posters, based on their previous work and how it connected to the themes and emotion of the intended episode. For "One of Us", created by Declan Shalvey and Jordie Bellaire, the poster features muted colors and shows "Coulson surrounded by villains [from the S.H.I.E.L.D. index], and the giant Cal looming over, and [a bird and] S.H.I.E.L.D. behind him."

=== Home media ===
The episode began streaming on Netflix on June 11, 2015, and was released along with the rest of the second season on September 18, 2015, on Blu-ray and DVD. The episode, along with the rest of the series, was removed from Netflix on February 28, 2022, and later became available on Disney+ on March 16, 2022.

== Reception ==
=== Ratings ===
In the United States the episode received a 1.6/5 percent share among adults between the ages of 18 and 49, meaning that it was seen by 1.6 percent of all households, and 5 percent of all of those watching television at the time of the broadcast. It was watched by 4.34 million viewers.
