= Aftershocks (Agents of S.H.I.E.L.D.) =

- Agents of S.H.I.E.L.D. episode
- "The Art of Evolution" poster for the episode
- Episode no.: Season 2 Episode 11
- Directed by: Billy Gierhart
- Written by: Maurissa Tancharoen; Jed Whedon
- Cinematography by: Feliks Parnell
- Editing by: David Crabtree
- Original air date: March 3, 2015
- Running time: 43 minutes

Guest appearances
- Kyle MacLachlan as Calvin Zabo; Henry Simmons as Alphonso "Mack" Mackenzie; Ruth Negga as Raina; Simon Kassianides as Sunil Bakshi; Adrian Pasdar as Glenn Talbot; Jamie Harris as Gordon; Fred Dryer as Octavian Bloom; Henry Goodman as List; Dichen Lachman as Jiaying

Episode chronology
← Previous "What They Become"	Next → "Who You Really Are"
- Agents of S.H.I.E.L.D. season 2

"Aftershocks" is the eleventh episode of the second season of the American television series Agents of S.H.I.E.L.D. Based on the Marvel Comics organization S.H.I.E.L.D., it follows Phil Coulson and his team of S.H.I.E.L.D. agents as they race to strike back against Hydra after an apparent defeat to the latter, while several characters discover they have gained new abilities following the end of the previous episode. It is set in the Marvel Cinematic Universe (MCU) and acknowledges the franchise's films. The episode was written by Maurissa Tancharoen and Jed Whedon, and directed by Billy Gierhart.

Clark Gregg reprises his role as Coulson from the film series, and is joined by series regulars Ming-Na Wen, Brett Dalton, Chloe Bennet, Iain De Caestecker, Elizabeth Henstridge, Nick Blood, and Adrianne Palicki. Palicki was promoted to series regular with this episode, after having a recurring guest role in the first half of the season. The episode also saw the return of Marvel's "The Art of..." marketing initiative.

"Aftershocks" originally aired on ABC on March 3, 2015, and according to Nielsen Media Research, was watched by 4.48 million viewers.

== Plot ==
In 1983, a young man named Gordon goes through a transformation, losing his eyes and gaining the ability to teleport. He is scared of what has happened to him, but is comforted by Jiaying, a young-appearing woman who herself is special, having not aged in decades. Jiaying has guided many young people through their own transformations, knowing that without guidance, they would be lost. This is a situation that her daughter, S.H.I.E.L.D. agent Skye, is now unknowingly in, having gained earthquake abilities in an alien city while her friend, Agent Antoine Triplett, died. In quarantine due to the potential effects of the city on her, Skye feels responsible for everything bad that has happened. Director Phil Coulson, however, blames Hydra for their misfortune, and devises a plan to get revenge against the rival organization.

Hydra themselves feel like they have been heavily defeated since Coulson killed their North American commander, Daniel Whitehall. In a meeting with several high level Hydra operatives, Dr. List, a representative of Hydra's leader Wolfgang von Strucker, explains that whoever can take out S.H.I.E.L.D. for good will get Whitehall's position, setting up a power struggle between the other members. In the alien city, Jemma Simmons is preparing to flood it to prevent anyone else entering it, but not before Raina, who was changed in the temple like Skye, crawls out of the rubble left by an earthquake and kills several agents. Raina's appearance is now monstrous – she is covered in thorns and spikes. Escaping the tunnels, Raina tracks down Skye's father, Cal, and demands he fix her. He reminds her that she got what she wanted, and tells her that if she can not live with who she has become, then she should not.

Coulson makes a deal with Brigadier General Glenn Talbot to give him Whitehall's former second-in-command, Sunil Bakshi, in exchange for assistance with taking down Hydra's forces. En route to the hand over, Coulson and Agent Melinda May are attacked by Hydra forces. After a fire fight, Coulson, May, and all but one Hydra operative are dead. Bakshi escapes with the operative, who is actually S.H.I.E.L.D. ally Lance Hunter: The attack was a ruse. Bakshi leads Hunter to the house of one of the top Hydra members, Octavian Bloom. Bloom and Bakshi believe that the other top members are targeting them, and send out an order to have them killed, along with Hunter. Hunter, with the help of Agent Bobbi Morse, fights his way into the house, kills Bloom, and takes Bakshi back into custody, to finally be delivered to Talbot. Now, all of Hydra's top level operatives in North America are dead.

Simmons feels that Raina may be the first victim of an epidemic, and should be put down. Leo Fitz deduces that Skye caused the earthquake in the alien city, and so herself has been altered just like Raina. Hearing what Simmons wants to do to Raina, Fitz decides to hide the truth from the rest of the team. Skye believes that there is something wrong with her, but Fitz tells her that she is just different now, and there is nothing wrong with that, and she is released from quarantine. Raina, unable to come to terms with who she is, takes Cal's advice and attempts suicide. She is prevented by S.H.I.E.L.D. agents, who try to take her in, but before anything happens, a much older Gordon appears, and teleports away with her.

In an end tag, a model car that Agent Alphonso "Mack" Mackenzie built for Coulson scans the latter's office, discovering the "toolbox" that former S.H.I.E.L.D. director Nick Fury gave to Coulson. Mack secretly reports this discovery to Morse while making food, then they join in with the rest of the team having drinks and sharing memories of Triplett.

== Production ==
=== Development ===
In February 2015, Marvel announced that the eleventh episode of the season would be titled "Aftershocks", to be written by executive producers Maurissa Tancharoen and Jed Whedon, with Billy Gierhart directing. The episode was originally titled "Epidemic".

=== Casting ===
In February 2015, Marvel revealed that main cast members Clark Gregg, Ming-Na Wen, Chloe Bennet, Iain De Caestecker, Elizabeth Henstridge, and Nick Blood would star as Phil Coulson, Melinda May, Skye, Leo Fitz, Jemma Simmons, and Lance Hunter, respectively, while Adrianne Palicki, previously a recurring guest star in the role of Bobbi Morse, was promoted to a series regular with the episode. It was also revealed that the guest cast for the episode would include Henry Simmons as Alphonso "Mack" Mackenzie, Ruth Negga as Raina, Adrian Pasdar as Brigadier General Glenn Talbot, Henry Goodman as Dr. List, Kyle MacLachlan as Calvin Zabo, Jamie Harris as Gordon, Simon Kassianides as Sunil Bakshi, Donzaleigh Abernathy as Triplett's mom, Philip Labes as young Gordon, Dichen Lachman as Jiaying, Alvin Ing as Yat-Sen, Fred Dryer as Octavian Bloom, Kathryn Leigh Scott as The Baroness, Joel Polis as The Banker, Kyle David Pierce as accountant, Maz Siam as The Sheikh, McKay Stewart as scientist #1 and David A. Jansen as agent. Abernathy, Labes, Ing, Scott, Polis, Pierce, Siam, Stewart, and Jansen did not receive guest star credit in the episode. Simmons, Negga, Pasdar, MacLachlan, Harris, Kassianides, and Lachman all reprise their roles from earlier in the series. Goodman reprises his role from an uncredited cameo appearance in the mid-credits scene of Captain America: The Winter Soldier. Main cast member Brett Dalton, who portrays Grant Ward in the series, does not appear in the episode.

== Release ==
=== Broadcast ===
"Aftershocks" was first aired in the United States on ABC on March 3, 2015.

=== Marketing ===
Starting with this episode, Marvel once again ran the "Art of..." initiative, in which an image was released the Thursday before the episode aired, depicting a first look at a key event from the upcoming episode, with the season's title being "The Art of Evolution". The different artists were once again chosen to create the teaser posters, based on their previous work and how it connected to the themes and emotion of the intended episode. The poster for "Aftershocks" was created by Gabriele Dell'Otto, the co-creator of Daisy Johnson, and depicts Skye twice, as she is transforming from the Terrigen Mist and as the person dealing with her powers, as well as a transformed Raina, Coulson and the S.H.I.E.L.D. logo in the background. Dell'Otto was chosen specifically because of his relationship to the character.

=== Home media ===
The episode began streaming on Netflix on June 11, 2015, and was released along with the rest of the second season on September 18, 2015, on Blu-ray and DVD. The episode, along with the rest of the series, was removed from Netflix on February 28, 2022, and later became available on Disney+ on March 16, 2022.

== Reception ==
=== Ratings ===
In the United States the episode received a 1.6/5 percent share among adults between the ages of 18 and 49, meaning that it was seen by 1.6 percent of all households, and 5 percent of all of those watching television at the time of the broadcast. It was watched by 4.48 million viewers.
