= One Door Closes =

- Agents of S.H.I.E.L.D. episode
- "The Art of Evolution" poster for the episode.
- Episode no.: Season 2 Episode 15
- Directed by: David Solomon
- Written by: Lauren LeFranc; Rafe Judkins
- Cinematography by: Allan Westbrook
- Editing by: Eric Litman
- Original air date: March 31, 2015
- Running time: 43 minutes

Guest appearances
- Henry Simmons as Alphonso "Mack" Mackenzie; Lucy Lawless as Isabelle Hartley; Kirk Acevedo as Tomas Calderon; Christine Adams as Anne Weaver; Jamie Harris as Gordon; Mackenzie Astin as Tim Maguire; Rick Otto as lead Hydra agent; Edward James Olmos as Robert Gonzales

Episode chronology
← Previous "Love in the Time of Hydra"	Next → "Afterlife"
- Agents of S.H.I.E.L.D. season 2

"One Door Closes" is the fifteenth episode of the second season of the American television series Agents of S.H.I.E.L.D. Based on the Marvel Comics organization S.H.I.E.L.D., it follows Phil Coulson and his team of S.H.I.E.L.D. agents as they face a rival faction of S.H.I.E.L.D. It is set in the Marvel Cinematic Universe (MCU) and acknowledges the franchise's films. The episode was written by Lauren LeFranc and Rafe Judkins, and directed by David Solomon.

Clark Gregg reprises his role as Coulson from the film series, and is joined by series regulars Ming-Na Wen, Brett Dalton, Chloe Bennet, Iain De Caestecker, Elizabeth Henstridge, Nick Blood, and Adrianne Palicki. Lucy Lawless, whose character both debuted and was killed in the season premiere, returns in flashbacks during the episode.

"One Door Closes" originally aired on ABC on March 31, 2015, and according to Nielsen Media Research, was watched by 4.26 million viewers.

== Plot ==
On the day S.H.I.E.L.D. fell, (Note: As depicted in Captain America: The Winter Soldier.) S.H.I.E.L.D. engineer Alphonso "Mack" Mackenzie is saved from Hydra double agents by agents Bobbi Morse and Isabelle Hartley, who have infiltrated the devastated S.H.I.E.L.D. aircraft carrier Iliad on former director Nick Fury's orders to save the commanding officer, Robert Gonzales, and to sink the ship and its sensitive cargo and give S.H.I.E.L.D. at large a chance to survive against Hydra. They find Gonzales with a severely wounded leg, and struggle to assist him. Morse plans for Hartley to clear the way for Mack to get Gonzales to safety, while she sinks the ship, but when Hartley finds other S.H.I.E.L.D. agents fighting back against Hydra, she and Mack convince Morse and Gonzales to help them rather than kill them by sinking the ship, going against Fury's orders. This was the beginning of their own faction of S.H.I.E.L.D., one that is against Fury and his secrets.

In the present day, Morse steals the "toolbox" that Fury gave new director Phil Coulson, but is confronted by Melinda May, while Coulson confronts Mack about his allegiances. Morse and May fight, but when reinforcements arrive to help May, Morse overrides the bases systems, creating an opportunity for herself and Mack to escape capture. At "The Retreat", a safe house for people with abilities that Bruce Banner created for himself, Agent Skye tries on the gloves that Agent Jemma Simmons created for her, intended to inhibit her new-found earthquake abilities. Though they assist with dampening the vibrations, they cause light headedness in Skye. She is visited by Gordon, a teleporting man with no eyes who explains how her gift can be used for good, tapping into the vibrations of all things. He offers to take her to a safe place where people like them can help her master these powers, and leaves her to make her own decision.

Simmons manages to detain Morse when the latter underestimates her, but when May finds a gas mask in Morse's possession, they realize that Morse and Mack never intended to escape. Dendrotoxin gas fills the base, knocking all those inside, bar May, unconscious. The agents of "the real S.H.I.E.L.D." that Morse and Mack work for enter the base and take control. Agent Tomas Calderon learns of Skye's whereabouts and asks to lead a team to detain her. Morse decides to go with him. At the cabin, Skye removes the gloves and successfully manipulates the movements of water, realizing that Gordon was right. Soon after, May calls her to warn of the incoming danger.

Gonzales explains to Coulson that they want his help in opening the toolbox, to ensure that none of Fury's secrets can harm S.H.I.E.L.D. or the rest of the world again. Coulson refuses to help, and May arrives, knocking Gonzales out and helping Coulson escape, before surrendering to Agent Anne Weaver. Skye runs from the S.H.I.E.L.D. agents hunting her, who Morse has ordered to use knock out bullets rather than real ones, as Skye is a S.H.I.E.L.D. agent just like them. Calderon, who has had bad experiences with gifted individuals before, tries to shoot Skye with a real gun, and as she attempts to defend herself, her abilities bring down a large section of the surrounding forest. A branch hits Calderon in the chest and Skye, horrified at what she can do, calls to Gordon for help. He promptly appears, and takes her away.

In an end tag, Coulson meets up with Lance Hunter, who agrees to become a permanent S.H.I.E.L.D. agent, and the two begin planning their next move.

== Production ==
=== Development ===
In March 2015, Marvel announced that the fifteenth episode of the season would be titled "One Door Closes", to be written by Lauren LeFranc and Rafe Judkins, with David Solomon directing.

=== Casting ===
In March 2015, Marvel revealed that main cast members Clark Gregg, Ming-Na Wen, Chloe Bennet, Iain De Caestecker, Elizabeth Henstridge, Nick Blood, and Adrianne Palicki would star as Phil Coulson, Melinda May, Skye, Leo Fitz, Jemma Simmons, Lance Hunter, and Bobbi Morse, respectively. It was also revealed that the guest cast for the episode would include Henry Simmons as Alphonso "Mack" Mackenzie, Lucy Lawless as Isabelle Hartley, Edward James Olmos as Robert Gonzales, Jamie Harris as Gordon, Christine Adams as Agent Anne Weaver, Kirk Acevedo as Agent Tomas Calderon, Cornelius Smith Jr. as Case, Sai Rao as Susanna, Mackenzie Astin as Tim Maguire and Rick Otto as lead Hydra agent. Smith and Rao did not receive guest star credit in the episode. Simmons, Lawless, Olmos, Harris, Adams, and Acevedo reprise their roles from earlier in the series. Main cast member Brett Dalton, who portrays Grant Ward in the series, does not appear in the episode.

=== Marvel Cinematic Universe tie-ins ===
This episode reveals that the safe house Skye is staying in, called "The Retreat", is also known as "the House that Banner Built", referring to Bruce Banner / Hulk, portrayed by Mark Ruffalo in the Avengers films.

== Release ==
=== Broadcast ===
"One Door Closes" was first aired in the United States on ABC on March 31, 2015.

=== Marketing ===
For the final twelve episodes of the season Marvel once again ran the "Art of..." initiative, in which an image was released the Thursday before the episode aired, depicting a first look at a key event from the upcoming episode, with the season's title being "The Art of Evolution". The different artists were once again chosen to create the teaser posters, based on their previous work and how it connected to the themes and emotion of the intended episode. "One Door Closes", an episode focused on Bobbi Morse's history, received a poster of her with the "real S.H.I.E.L.D." logo, that "embraced the basics" of four-color printing, utilizing magenta, cyan, black and yellow, while still having layers and complications, much like the character of Morse. The poster was designed by Delicious Design League, who executive producer Jeffrey Bell explained were chosen because "We try to come up with what would be a good fit based on the artist. And what I like about this image, and what I like about them in general, is if you look at their work ... from a distance, it's a simple, clean graphic. It's visually striking. And you get close, and there's just a ton of stuff going on. There's just lots of detail, lots of little things, lots of movement, and I do love that ... in printing, these are process colors: magenta, cyan, black and yellow. Those are the basics of all four-color printing. And the fact they sort of embraced the basics like that, kept the basics there and then threw overlaying and complications and made it so much more than that, I think also speaks to the character".

=== Home media ===
The episode began streaming on Netflix on June 11, 2015, and was released along with the rest of the second season on September 18, 2015, on Blu-ray and DVD. The episode, along with the rest of the series, was removed from Netflix on February 28, 2022, and later became available on Disney+ on March 16, 2022.

== Reception ==
=== Ratings ===
In the United States the episode received a 1.4/4 percent share among adults between the ages of 18 and 49, meaning that it was seen by 1.4 percent of all households, and 4 percent of all of those watching television at the time of the broadcast. It was watched by 4.26 million viewers.

=== Accolades ===
In June 2016, IGN ranked the episode as the sixth best in the series so far.
