= Drew Z. Greenberg =

American television producer and writer

- Occupation: Writer

Drew Z. Greenberg is an American television producer and writer best known for working on Buffy the Vampire Slayer, Smallville, The O.C., Dexter, Warehouse 13, Arrow and Agents of S.H.I.E.L.D. He has also written some comic books, like Green Arrow and Buffy the Vampire Slayer comics.

== Personal life ==
Greenberg is openly gay, and is proud to work gay and lesbian characters into his scripts. "I’ve never written an original pilot script that didn’t have at least one gay character in it, even if I was the only one who knew that character was going to be gay. Sure, telling stories about gays and lesbians has been a priority for me."

In 2022, Greenberg joined current and past Disney employees who criticized Bob Chapek for refusing to criticize anti-LGBT legislation that was passed in Florida.

== Career ==
=== Buffy the Vampire Slayer ===
- "Smashed" (November 20, 2001)
- "Older and Far Away" (February 12, 2002)
- "Entropy" (April 30, 2002)
- "Him" (November 5, 2002)
- "The Killer in Me" (February 4, 2003)
- "Empty Places" (April 29, 2003)

=== Firefly ===
- "Safe" (October 18, 2002)

=== Smallville ===
- "Slumber" (October 22, 2003)
- "Hereafter" (February 4, 2004)
- "Truth" (April 21, 2004)

=== The O.C. ===
- "The Family Ties" (January 6, 2005)
- "The Second Chance" (February 3, 2005)

=== Dexter ===
- "Let's Give the Boy a Hand" (October 22, 2006)
- "Truth Be Told" (December 10, 2006)

=== Star Wars: The Clone Wars ===
- "The Hidden Enemy" (February 6, 2009)
- "Lightsaber Lost" (January 22, 2010)
- "Duchess of Mandalore" (February 12, 2010)
- "Senate Murders" (March 12, 2010)
- "Lethal Trackdown" (April 30, 2010)

=== Warehouse 13 ===
- "Claudia" (July 28, 2009)
- "For the Team" (August 17, 2010)
- "Where and When" (September 7, 2010)
- "Trials" (July 18, 2011)
- "Stand" (October 3, 2011)
- "There's Always a Downside" (August 13, 2012)
- "The Living and the Dead" (April 29, 2013)
- "The Truth Hurts" (July 8, 2013)

=== Arrow ===
- "Salvation" (March 27, 2013)
- "Darkness on the Edge of Town" (May 8, 2013)
- "League of Assassins" (November 6, 2013)
- "State v. Queen" (November 20, 2013)
- "Tremors" (January 29, 2014)
- "Deathstroke" (April 2, 2014)

=== Agents of S.H.I.E.L.D. ===
- "Face My Enemy" (October 14, 2014)
- "Who You Really Are" (March 10, 2015)
- "The Dirty Half Dozen" (April 28, 2015)
- "Among Us Hide..." (November 3, 2015)
- "Watchdogs" (March 29, 2016) (co-writer)
- "Absolution" (May 17, 2016)
- "Meet the New Boss" (September 27, 2016)
- "Wake Up" (January 24, 2017)
- "A Life Earned" (December 15, 2017)
- "All the Comforts of Home" (March 2, 2018)
- "The Force of Gravity" (May 11, 2018)
- "Leap" (July 19, 2019)
- "As I Have Always Been" (July 22, 2020)

== See also ==
- Mutant Enemy Productions
