= Maya Stojan =

Swiss actress (born 1986)

- Born: 28 June 1986 (age 38); Geneva, Switzerland
- Occupation: Actress
- Years active: 2009–present
- Spouse: Todd Clever (m. 2021)
- Website: www.mayastojan.com

Maya Stojan (born 28 June 1986) is a Swiss-born American actress. She is known for her recurring roles as Tory Ellis on Castle and Kara Palamas on Agents of S.H.I.E.L.D.

== Early life ==
Maya Stojan was born in 1986 and raised in Geneva, Switzerland, where she was educated at the International School of Geneva. Her mother originates from Sri Lanka and her father from the Czech Republic. Stojan has a sister, speaks English and French at an advanced level, plays golf and runs Yoga and Transcendental Meditation. In 2008 she was awarded a Bachelor of Fine Arts in acting at the Hartt School of Theatre and Music, West Hartford, Connecticut. Then she moved to Los Angeles where Stojan premiered in the short films Chasing Forever and I Kill To Live. Stojan's further acting training took place in Los Angeles by Donovan Scott (2009), Carolyne Barry's workshops for Actors (2009) and at the Ivana Chubbuck Studio where she graduated the Master Class of 2011.

== Career ==
Maya Stojan played a supporting role in the US thriller Sinners and Saints and in further short films and television series, among them Entourage, Criminal Minds and the recurring character Kara Palamas / Agent 33 in Agents of S.H.I.E.L.D. (8 episodes) in 2014 and 2015. Since 2013, her probably best known role is the recurring character Tory Ellis, an officer in the NYPD's Crime Scene Unit who specialises in technical analysis and supports Kate Beckett's team, in the US crime-series Castle.

== Personal life ==
Stojan met American former rugby player Todd Clever through social media. They began dating in 2020 and currently reside in Cardiff-by-the-Sea, California.

The couple became engaged on 28 August 2020 and married 3 April 2021 on Lake Geneva. Together they have one son, Leo.

== Filmography ==
Year	Title	Role	Notes
2009	Chasing Forever	Erica Walker	Short film
2009	I Kill to Live	Steph	Short film
2010	Sinners and Saints	Nadia	
2010	Entourage	Stan Lee's Assistant	TV series (1 episode)
2010	The Prometheus Project	Dr. Walton's Nurse	
2011	The Faithful	LCPL. Jessica Sanchez	Short film
2011	Irish Eyes	Meaghan	Short film
2011	Elwood	Angelica	Short film
2012	Plan B	Cindy	Short film
2012	Criminal Minds	Hostess	TV series (1 episode)
2012	I Cut I	Isabelle Tesla	Short film
2012	Bad Weather Films	Stephanie	TV series (1 episode)
2012	Anatomy of Violence	Female Cop	TV film
2013	How to Live with Your Parents (For the Rest of Your Life)	Mrs. Saletta	TV series (1 episode)
2013	The Contractor	Maria Parra	
2013–2015	Castle	Tory Ellis	TV series (26 episodes)
2014	That Guy	Liz	TV film (pilot)
2014	Elwood	Angelica	
2014	High School Possession	Emma	TV film
2014–2015	Agents of S.H.I.E.L.D.	Kara Palamas / Agent 33	TV series (8 episodes)
2015	I'm Patrick, and You're Insane	Maya	Short film
2015	The Dalhia Knights	Squirrell	
2016	NCIS	Meredith Regan	TV series (1 episode)
2016	Grey's Anatomy	Tatiana Flauto	TV series (1 episode)
2016	Diagnosis Delicious	Nina Kirby	TV film
2017	Newness	Quinn	
2020	Reboot Camp	Claire	
2020	Fatal Affair	Courtney	
2022	Magnum P.I.	Maya	TV series
