= The Hub (Agents of S.H.I.E.L.D.) =

- Agents of S.H.I.E.L.D. episode
- Episode no.: Season 1 Episode 7
- Directed by: Bobby Roth
- Written by: Rafe Judkins; Lauren LeFranc
- Cinematography by: Feliks Parnell
- Editing by: Paul Trejo
- Original air date: November 12, 2013
- Running time: 44 minutes

Guest appearances
- Saffron Burrows as Victoria Hand; Maximiliano Hernández as Jasper Sitwell; Ilia Volok as Vladimir; Alison White as Marta

Episode chronology
← Previous "FZZT"	Next → "The Well"
- Agents of S.H.I.E.L.D. season 1

"The Hub" is the seventh episode of the first season of the American television series Agents of S.H.I.E.L.D. Based on the Marvel Comics organization S.H.I.E.L.D., it follows Phil Coulson and his team of S.H.I.E.L.D. agents as they work with "Big S.H.I.E.L.D." to take out a dangerous new weapon. It is set in the Marvel Cinematic Universe (MCU) and acknowledges the franchise's films. The episode was written by Rafe Judkins and Lauren LeFranc, and directed by Bobby Roth.

Clark Gregg reprises his role as Coulson from the film series, and is joined by series regulars Ming-Na Wen, Brett Dalton, Chloe Bennet, Iain De Caestecker, and Elizabeth Henstridge. Maximiliano Hernández guest stars as Agent Jasper Sitwell, reprising his role from the films, while Saffron Burrows is introduced as high-ranking S.H.I.E.L.D. agent Victoria Hand. The episode explores the dynamic between Coulson's team and the larger S.H.I.E.L.D. organization (referred to as "Big S.H.I.E.L.D." by the producers); "Big S.H.I.E.L.D." received its own musical theme for the episode, to separate it from the main team.

"The Hub" originally aired on ABC on November 12, 2013, and according to Nielsen Media Research, was watched by 10.13 million viewers within a week of its release. The episode received a mostly positive critical response, with the character development and the moral ambiguity of the larger S.H.I.E.L.D. organization praised.

== Plot ==
Agents Phil Coulson, Melinda May, and Grant Ward break an undercover agent out of a hostile base in Siberia, receiving classified S.H.I.E.L.D. level 8 intel. Trainee Skye is frustrated when Coulson refuses to tell the team what the information is, based on their clearance level. At The Hub, a S.H.I.E.L.D. facility run by Agent Victoria Hand, it is revealed that a South Ossetian separatist group has built a weapon called the Overkill device, which uses sonic vibrations to trigger other weapons from great distances. Ward, a field specialist, and Agent Leo Fitz, a weapons technology specialist, are tasked with finding and disabling the device within 24 hours, before the separatists use it to declare independence from Russia and Georgia.

In the Caucasus Mountains, Ward discovers his contact from a previous mission is dead, but Fitz uses his technology and engineering knowledge to win the support of locals, who smuggle them across a disputed border. At The Hub, Skye is determined to find out the status of Fitz' and Ward's mission despite her restricted access. She discovers that there is no extraction plan for Fitz and Ward, but when she confronts Coulson, he tells her to trust the system. Coulson then confronts Hand, as he himself had not been aware of this, though she tells him to trust the system. Fitz and Ward infiltrate a separatist base and find the device, and though Ward realizes that there is no extraction team, they carry on with their mission. Fitz disables the device, and they attempt to escape. The rest of the team arrives to rescue them, Coulson having disobeyed orders to save them.

Coulson reveals to Skye that he had found a document that she had been searching for regarding her history, and tells her that it contains information on a S.H.I.E.L.D. agent who dropped her at an orphanage when she was a baby. Later, May agrees to help Coulson find more information on the S.H.I.E.L.D. agent in question, who had been murdered. In an end tag, Coulson is denied access to his own death and recovery file.

== Production ==
=== Development and writing ===
In October 2013, Marvel revealed that the seventh episode would be titled "The Hub", and would be written by Rafe Judkins and Lauren LeFranc, with Bobby Roth directing; it was the eighth episode produced in the season. The episode was originally titled "The Sandwich Incident", and was changed after series' creator Joss Whedon felt it should be called "The Hub" instead.

Executive producer Jed Whedon discussed the writer's intentions to expand their depiction of S.H.I.E.L.D. with the episode, saying, "We're trying to flesh out the world of S.H.I.E.L.D. with the established characters and the characters we're introducing to build out the larger organization that we operate in." This includes the introduction of high-ranking S.H.I.E.L.D. agent Victoria Hand, who is shown lying to Coulson in the episode. Executive producer Maurissa Tancharoen called this "a very significant thing ... for him to deal with Victoria Hand lying to him and facing the fact that the organization that he's been dedicating his life to lied to his face about the people within his team ... that's significant in his journey." LeFranc called being able to feature Hand in the episode "really exciting", and added the writers were at a point where they wanted Coulson "to start questioning things... And here is Victoria Hand who has a hard line – she sees people as numbers more than people."

"The Hub" also begins to further the relationship between Grant Ward and Leo Fitz, one that would continue to build throughout the season that "really pays off at the end of the season". Judkins and LeFranc, who have a sketch-comedy background, enjoyed creating the running gag in the episode of Jemma Simmons unable to tell a lie. LeFranc felt Fitz and Simmons needed "to have some kind of deep specific connection to show their history", which resulted in the specific sandwich Simmons makes for Fitz.

=== Casting ===
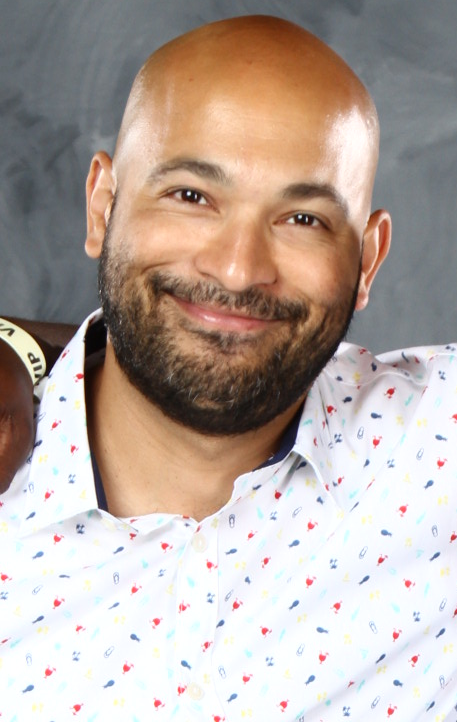
Maximiliano Hernández reprises his film role of Jasper Sitwell in a guest appearance.

In October 2013, Marvel revealed that main cast members Clark Gregg, Ming-Na Wen, Brett Dalton, Chloe Bennet, Iain De Caestecker, and Elizabeth Henstridge would star as Phil Coulson, Melinda May, Grant Ward, Skye, Leo Fitz, and Jemma Simmons, respectively. It was also revealed that Maximiliano Hernández would reprise his role of Jasper Sitwell from the Marvel Cinematic Universe films Thor (2011) and The Avengers (2012), and the Marvel One-Shots The Consultant (2011) and Item 47 (2012), in the episode. Additionally, the episode's guest cast includes Charles Halford as Agent Shaw, Alison White as Marta, and Ilia Volok as Vladimir. Halford did not receive guest star credit in the episode. In November, Victoria Hand was also announced to be a guest character, with Saffron Burrows cast in the role.

=== Filming ===
Filming occurred from October 4 to 15, 2013. The interior of the Pacific Design Center was used to film scenes set at the Hub, while Hand's command center and some corridors were built as sets. The Russian compound was filmed at a power station in California.

=== Music ===
To highlight the differences between Coulson's small S.H.I.E.L.D. team and the larger S.H.I.E.L.D. organization, represented in this episode by Victoria Hand and the Hub base, composer Bear McCreary introduced a theme for "Big S.H.I.E.L.D." which is meant to feel "imposing and new". For the major scenes in the episode when Skye distrusts the "system" and takes matters into her own hands, McCreary used her own personal theme in a pulsing, swirling way, juxtaposed against the same theme in "a warm variation ... filled with emotion" for when Skye and Coulson discuss her parents.

== Release ==
=== Broadcast ===
"The Hub" was aired in the United States on ABC on November 12, 2013. It was aired alongside the US broadcast in Canada on CTV, while it was first aired in the United Kingdom on Channel 4 on November 15, 2013. It premiered on the Seven Network in Australia on November 13, 2013.

=== Home media ===
The episode, along with the rest of Agents of S.H.I.E.L.D.'s first season, was released on Blu-ray and DVD on September 9, 2014. Bonus features include behind-the-scenes featurettes, audio commentary, deleted scenes, and a blooper reel. On November 20, 2014, the episode became available for streaming on Netflix. The episode, along with the rest of the series, was removed from Netflix on February 28, 2022, and later became available on Disney+ on March 16, 2022.

== Reception ==
=== Ratings ===
In the United States the episode received a 2.2/6 percent share among adults between the ages of 18 and 49, meaning that it was seen by 2.2 percent of all households, and 6 percent of all of those watching television at the time of the broadcast. It was watched by 6.67 million viewers. The Canadian broadcast gained 1.47 million viewers, the fourth highest for that day and the twentieth highest for the week. The United Kingdom premiere had 2.19 million viewers and in Australia, the premiere had 1.4 million viewers, including 0.6 million timeshifted viewers. Within a week of its release, the episode was watched by 10.13 million U.S. viewers, above the season average of 8.31.

=== Critical response ===
Oliver Sava and David Sims of The A.V. Club graded the episode a "B−". Sava called the episode "a mixed bag", listing its new character combinations and the exploration of "the duplicitous nature of S.H.I.E.L.D." as positives, but saying that "the negatives continue to prevent the series from becoming more than middle-of-the-road action adventure television." Sims felt that the series was showing potential, but could not tell what was needed to get the series to a point where he could "recommend this show to anyone but a Marvel completest." Eric Goldman of IGN scored the episode 7.7 out of 10, praising the world building and character development of Fitz, but criticizing the way the protagonists left without consequences at the end of the episode. Marc Buxton at Den of Geek scored the episode 3 stars out 5, praising the character development and introduction of comic book characters Hand and Sitwell, but criticizing the lack of a real villain, for both the episode and the series in general.

Dave Bradley of SFX also scored the episode 3 stars out of 5, feeling the episode's plot was "fairly forgettable", but being pleased with the developments of the overarching subplots. Bob Chipman, writing for Escapist Magazine found the episode's focus on the relationships between Ward and Fitz, and Skye and Simmons, to be disappointing since "the pairings don't really pan out to be that interesting." He did enjoy the episode's focus on the lack of trust building between the central team and the larger S.H.I.E.L.D. organization, and said that the series was improving in a way that could retroactively improve the earlier episodes. Kaitlin Thomas at TV.com felt that the episode was a "good—but not necessarily great—episode that acted mainly as a humorous standalone installment intended to switch up some character pairs." She specifically praised Fitz' character development, but criticized the lack of tension, negatively comparing the stakes of the episode to those of "FZZT". Jim Steranko, known for his work on Nick Fury, Agent of S.H.I.E.L.D., criticized the lack of focus of the series, feeling at this point it was moving in "a multitude of directions that lack conceptual unity". He called the result "choppy and unsatisfying at best, downright irritating at worst."
