= FZZT =

- Agents of S.H.I.E.L.D. episode
- Episode no.: Season 1 Episode 6
- Directed by: Vincent Misiano
- Written by: Paul Zbyszewski
- Cinematography by: Feliks Parnell
- Editing by: Joshua Charson
- Original air date: November 5, 2013
- Running time: 43 minutes

Guest appearances
- Vincent Laresca as Tony Diaz; Titus Welliver as Felix Blake

Episode chronology
← Previous "Girl in the Flower Dress"	Next → "The Hub"
- Agents of S.H.I.E.L.D. season 1

"FZZT" is the sixth episode of the first season of the American television series Agents of S.H.I.E.L.D. Based on the Marvel Comics organization S.H.I.E.L.D., it follows Phil Coulson and his team of S.H.I.E.L.D. agents as they investigate a series of deaths caused by an alien virus. It is set in the Marvel Cinematic Universe (MCU) and acknowledges the franchise's films. The episode was written by Paul Zbyszewski, and directed by Vincent Misiano.

Clark Gregg reprises his role as Coulson from the film series, and is joined by series regulars Ming-Na Wen, Brett Dalton, Chloe Bennet, Iain De Caestecker, and Elizabeth Henstridge. The episode draws comparisons to the plight of first responders to the September 11 attacks by showing firefighters (with guest star Vincent Laresca playing one) dying as a consequence of responding to the Battle of New York, as seen in Marvel's The Avengers. The episode also features a major skydiving sequence, realized by combining live footage with CGI, as part of the development of the characters Leo Fitz and Jemma Simmons, who received their own musical theme for the episode. It also sees Titus Welliver reprise his role from the Marvel One-Shot Item 47 as S.H.I.E.L.D. agent Felix Blake.

"FZZT" originally aired on ABC on November 5, 2013, and according to Nielsen Media Research, was watched by 10.93 million viewers within a week of its release. The episode received a positive critical response, with the character development praised, especially that of the characters Fitz and Simmons.

== Plot ==
In Pennsylvania, a Boy Scout leader is killed in an apparent freak lightning incident after investigating a mysterious humming sound. His body is found floating above the ground, warranting the intervention of Agent Phil Coulson and his team of S.H.I.E.L.D. agents. Agents Leo Fitz and Jemma Simmons are unable to determine the cause of death. Satellites pick up another lightning event not far from the first, and Coulson, with Agents Melinda May and Grant Ward, arrives at the source to find a second body, floating like the first. Civilian hacker and S.H.I.E.L.D. trainee Skye discovers that the two victims were both volunteer firefighters from the same station who responded to the Battle of New York.

At the firehouse they discover a third firefighter, Tony Diaz, who can hear a strange humming sound. Satellites pick up a third electrical event at the firehouse, as May discovers a Chitauri helmet in Diaz's possession—a souvenir from the Battle of New York. Diaz and the other victims had been cleaning "rust" from the helmet several nights earlier, and Simmons deduces that they were all infected with an alien virus. Coulson helps Diaz come to terms with his situation, before leaving him to die. Aboard the Bus (the plane that serves as the agents' mobile base) the team are transporting the helmet to the Sandbox, a S.H.I.E.L.D. research facility located in Africa, when Coulson realizes that Simmons has been infected as well. She gives herself only 2 hours to live, but the plane is above the Atlantic Ocean and at least 3 hours from land. Agent Felix Blake at S.H.I.E.L.D. headquarters orders Coulson to dump her off the plane rather than risk the safety of the rest of the team, but Coulson refuses. Rather than let the rest of the team die, Simmons jumps out of the plane herself; moments later, Fitz discovers an antidote for the virus. Ward jumps after her with a parachute and the cure, saving her life.

In an end tag, Blake confronts Coulson about his insubordination, warning him that he could lose his team if he is not careful.

== Production ==
=== Development and writing ===
In October 2013, Marvel revealed that the sixth episode would be titled "FZZT", and would be written by Paul Zbyszewski, with Vincent Misiano directing. Zbyszewski credited fellow writers Lauren LeFranc and Rafe Judkins for "a lot of the fun" in the episode. Zbyszewski said the audition scene between Elizabeth Henstridge and Iain De Caestecker served as the "genesis" for the events of "FZZT", with a similar storyline conceived by the creators as part of the initial scripts ordered by ABC. He also felt the story told in the episode was one that usually "isn't possible at the beginning" of a series, as it "must be earned", explaining the goal was to have the audience "feel for" Jemma Simmons and Leo Fitz. "FZZT" was also the first episode where the series began to move away from the procedural "case of the week" into more serialized storylines.

=== Casting ===
Main cast members Clark Gregg, Ming-Na Wen, Brett Dalton, Chloe Bennet, Iain De Caestecker, and Elizabeth Henstridge star as Phil Coulson, Melinda May, Grant Ward, Skye, Leo Fitz, and Jemma Simmons, respectively. Titus Welliver reprises his role of Agent Felix Blake from the Marvel One-Shot Item 47 (2012), while Vincent Laresca also guest stars as Tony Diaz.

=== Design ===
The Chitauri helmet featured in the episode was created by props master Scott Bauer. Bauer had originally looked in Marvel's archives for one from The Avengers (2012), but learned the film had only featured CGI helmets, requiring him to request the rights to the design from Marvel Studios to fabricate the helmet. Because of time constraints, only one helmet was able to be made for filming the episode.

=== Filming and visual effects ===
Brett Dalton's digital double for the skydiving scene, with performance capture by stunt man Greg Rementer (insert)

Filming occurred from September 12 to 19, 2013. Mark Kolpack, visual effects supervisor for the series, explained that multiple techniques were used to create the effects for the climactic skydiving sequence in the episode. Henstridge and Dalton were filmed in front of a green screen on wires and a turntable, with the sky, clouds, and ocean added with computer-generated imagery. The two actors were also digitally scanned to produce digital stunt doubles for use in "larger scope shots that were not possible with the real actors." For these shots, skydiver Hannah Betts and stuntman Greg Rementer performed on the Sony Motion Capture Stage, with the movements captured through performance-capture technology and used to drive the digital double performances.

=== Music ===
For the scene where Coulson talks to the dying Diaz, composer Bear McCreary and the series' producers wanted to leave the scene mostly without music, feeling that Gregg's performance did enough on its own. Once Coulson "confesses that he once died, the orchestral strings sneak in with an elegant adagio." The scene ends with "a solitary flugel horn solo" giving a statement of Coulson's musical theme, which McCreary felt was reminiscent of a military funeral and highlighted Coulson's "sense of honor".

When it is revealed that Simmons is infected with the virus, McCreary felt that the most important element of the sequence was that the relationship between Fitz and Simmons, who had been treated as a "single unit" up until this episode, was at stake. McCreary subsequently introduced a "FitzSimmons" theme, starting as "a handful of [sparse] chords" that build throughout the episode, picking up energy and gradually weaving into a definitive theme. When the characters discover a cure for Simmons, the beats per minute of the theme increase to reflect Fitz's excitement. This is followed by a montage of the pair working on the cure. McCreary noted that montages are often scored with "montage music", but he felt that focusing on the two characters and their relationship was important for the sequence, and so chose "an even faster version of their theme" instead.

=== Marvel Cinematic Universe tie-ins ===
The alien helmet that is carrying the virus in the episode belonged to a Chitauri, the alien race that fought for Loki in Marvel's The Avengers.

== Release ==
=== Broadcast ===
"FZZT" was first aired in the United States on ABC on November 5, 2013. It was aired alongside the US broadcast in Canada on CTV, while it was first aired in the United Kingdom on Channel 4 on November 8, 2013. It premiered on the Seven Network in Australia on November 15, 2013.

=== Home media ===
The episode, along with the rest of Agents of S.H.I.E.L.D.'s first season, was released on Blu-ray and DVD on September 9, 2014. Bonus features include behind-the-scenes featurettes, audio commentary, deleted scenes, and a blooper reel. On November 20, 2014, the episode became available for streaming on Netflix. The episode, along with the rest of the series, was removed from Netflix on February 28, 2022, and later became available on Disney+ on March 16, 2022.

== Reception ==
=== Ratings ===
In the United States the episode received a 2.5/7 percent share among adults between the ages of 18 and 49, meaning that it was seen by 2.5 percent of all households, and 7 percent of all of those watching television at the time of the broadcast. It was watched by 7.15 million viewers. The Canadian broadcast gained 1.60 million viewers, the third highest for that day and the twelfth highest for the week. The United Kingdom premiere had 2.23 million viewers and in Australia, the premiere had 1.5 million viewers, including 0.7 million timeshifted viewers. Within a week of its release, the episode was watched by 10.93 million U.S. viewers, above the season average of 8.31.

=== Critical response ===
Eric Goldman of IGN scored the episode an 8 out of 10, praising "well-needed" development of Fitz and Simmons, the skydiving scene (despite what he calls "the less than stellar FX"), and the fact that Coulson could not save Diaz, while criticizing the amount of MCU connections, stating that the series is "Still too tied to prior Marvel movie MacGuffins." Oliver Sava of The A.V. Club graded the episode a "B", saying "Despite my problems with the series, I still look forward to watching S.H.I.E.L.D. every week. It does a good job capturing the thrill of the big screen on a TV budget ... the dialogue is breezy, and the cast becomes more appealing with each new episode. There's plenty of room for this show to grow, but I'm not ready to write it off yet." Alan Sepinwall at HitFix called "FZZT" "the first installment of S.H.I.E.L.D. to suggest the creative team was aware of what's not working, even if they couldn't solve every problem in a single installment", feeling that the episode made several positive steps forward in terms of character development. Will Salmon gave the episode 3.5 stars out of 5 for SFX, praising the performances of Henstridge and Gregg, but calling the episode clichéd, and concluding that "by fleshing out the characters, it does feel like Agents of S.H.I.E.L.D. is now more than just a flashy brand extension."

Dan Casey writing for Nerdist felt the episode was "the most dramatic, tense hour of television we've seen from" the series, stating that "One of the show's biggest problems has been its general lack of depth, particularly in terms of the characters and making them feel like real people rather than glossy superspies with a seemingly endless wellspring of one-liners" and decided that the episode "made significant steps towards fixing this problem, thanks to some wonderful character interactions and an exploration of Fitz/Simmons' past". James Hunt of Den of Geek said "whether this episode continues the show's upwards trend, that's debatable. It could've been worse, but there wasn't the leap forward that we saw from episode three to four, or four to five. I'll say this for an episode: it was better than I thought a Fitz & Simmons episode would be. That's progress, of a sort." Jim Steranko, known for his work on Nick Fury, Agent of S.H.I.E.L.D., criticized the scope and scale of the episode, but praised the character development for Coulson, feeling it brought his character closer to the S.H.I.E.L.D. agents of the comics.

=== Analysis ===
While talking about the score of the episode, composer McCreary noted the parallels between the firefighter victims "who went to New York to help people and ended up contracting an incurable illness that will kill [them]" and the plight of the first responders to the September 11 attacks. Kevin Garcia, while writing for the Observation Deck at io9, noted that "Marvel does have a few significant firefighters. Most notably, although not well-remembered, are the heroes from Call of Duty", who were themselves inspired by the real-world heroes who responded to the September 11 attacks.
