= After, Before =

- Agents of S.H.I.E.L.D. episode
- The title card introduced in this episode reflects the season's time travel story, taking inspiration from Tron (1982) and Back to the Future (1985)
- Episode no.: Season 7 Episode 8
- Directed by: Eli Gonda
- Written by: James C. Oliver; Sharla Oliver
- Cinematography by: Kyle Jewell
- Editing by: Dexter Adriano
- Original air date: July 15, 2020
- Running time: 42 minutes

Guest appearances
- Joel Stoffer as Enoch; Thomas E. Sullivan as Nathaniel Malick; Dichen Lachman as Jiaying; Dianne Doan as Kora; Byron Mann as Li; Enver Gjokaj as Daniel Sousa

Episode chronology
← Previous "The Totally Excellent Adventures of Mack and The D"	Next → "As I Have Always Been"
- Agents of S.H.I.E.L.D. season 7

"After, Before" is the eighth episode of the seventh season of the American television series Agents of S.H.I.E.L.D. Based on the Marvel Comics organization S.H.I.E.L.D., it follows a Life Model Decoy (LMD) of Phil Coulson and his team of S.H.I.E.L.D. agents as they race to stop the Chronicoms from unraveling history in the 1980s. It is set in the Marvel Cinematic Universe (MCU) and acknowledges the franchise's films. The episode was written by James C. Oliver & Sharla Oliver and directed by Eli Gonda.

Clark Gregg reprises his role as Coulson from the film series, starring alongside Ming-Na Wen, Chloe Bennet, Elizabeth Henstridge, Henry Simmons, Natalia Cordova-Buckley, and Jeff Ward. The episode sees Wen's Melinda May and Cordova-Buckley's Elena "Yo-Yo" Rodriguez visiting Jiaying, portrayed by returning season two guest star Dichen Lachman, to try to restore Yo-Yo's abilities so she can fix the team's malfunctioning time drive. The episode explores elements of Yo-Yo's past.

"After, Before" originally aired on ABC on July 15, 2020, and was watched by 1.38 million viewers. It received generally positive reviews, particularly for its character moments.

== Plot ==
After rescuing Alphonso "Mack" Mackenzie, Deke Shaw, and Phil Coulson from 1983 and giving Coulson a new LMD body, Jemma Simmons informs the S.H.I.E.L.D. team that due to their damaged time drive, their mobile headquarters, Zephyr One, is going to keep jumping them forward by exponentially less time until it will eventually make a jump within another jump, the consequences of which are unknown. Requiring Elena "Yo-Yo" Rodriguez's currently inactive Inhuman powers to deactivate it, fellow Inhuman Daisy Johnson suggests stopping by the Inhuman sanctuary Afterlife to get help from her mother, Jiaying. Yo-Yo and Melinda May arrive just as Jiaying is helping her despondent daughter Kora with her volatile energy powers. After examining Yo-Yo, Jiaying comes to the conclusion that the former's problems are mental rather than physical and has May use her empath abilities to help her. While sparring, Yo-Yo reveals that she witnessed the death of her uncle as a child and blamed herself for it ever since.

Meanwhile, Jiaying attempts to use Yo-Yo's situation to remove Kora's powers and save her. However, Kora runs away and attempts to commit suicide, only for Nathaniel Malick to find her and convince her to join him instead by using his Chronicom ally, Sibyl's, future knowledge. As Malick's mercenaries attack Afterlife and capture its Inhumans, Jiaying fails to sway her daughter back to her side, forcing her to flee with May, Yo-Yo, and teleporting Inhuman Gordon before the agents and Inhumans temporarily go their separate ways. Upon returning to Zephyr One, Yo-Yo realizes she has been holding herself back and regains her powers as she seemingly deactivates the time drive without bouncing back to the place she started from. As the crew settles in however, the time drive suddenly starts up again and makes a jump within a jump.

== Production ==
=== Development ===
After the sixth season finale of Agents of S.H.I.E.L.D. aired in August 2019, showrunners Jed Whedon, Maurissa Tancharoen, and Jeffrey Bell revealed that the seventh season would feature the team trying to save the world from invasion by the Chronicoms. They used time travel to do this, allowing the season to explore the history of S.H.I.E.L.D. Later that month, one of the season's episodes was revealed to be titled "After, Before" and written by James C. Oliver & Sharla Oliver. It was confirmed to be the eighth episode of the season in July 2020, when Eli Gonda was revealed to have directed it. The title is a reference to the episode revisiting the Inhuman community Afterlife, a location from the second season, but before the series had previously visited it since the episode is set during 1983 rather than the modern day setting of the second season.

=== Writing ===
The focus of the episode is Melinda May and Elena "Yo-Yo" Rodriguez traveling to Afterlife to help Yo-Yo learn why her powers are no longer working. Yo-Yo actress Natalia Cordova-Buckley said "Yo-Yo is having to for the first time really get personal about herself," adding that she felt Yo-Yo had been questioning herself because, by losing her powers, she had lost her strongest tool to help the team. The trip to Afterlife allows Yo-Yo to find "powers within herself that have nothing to do with superpowers". James Oliver was excited to explore Afterlife as he was just a fan of the series when it was last featured, in the second season, though Sharla Oliver was already working on the series at that time. Cordova-Buckley enjoyed Yo-Yo's combination with May because the latter also "has had a lot of hardships in her past", resulting in "a lot of reflection" from Yo-Yo. Their dynamic in the episode, which was described by James Oliver as "an emotional feedback loop", was inspired by Oliver's mother and sister.

Regarding Yo-Yo's flashback sequence, in which a young Elena saves her grandmother's gold cross necklace resulting in her uncle's murder, Cordova-Buckley said she "always had some sort of idea that something very, very tragic must have happened to Yo-Yo." She continued, "I love that it reflects her way of always trying to save the people she loves, but sometimes she makes a mistake — and she holds that pain in her heart. She always thought that doing what she did [that night] when she was young hurt her family, so she has carried that a long time." In past episodes, Yo-Yo appeared to be carrying "a bit of heaviness" from her past, even though it was not known, with this episode "bring[ing] it full circle". Cordova-Buckley stated that "no one writes or knows [Yo-Yo] like" James and Sharla Oliver, highlighting their work on the Yo-Yo-focused spin-off series Agents of S.H.I.E.L.D.: Slingshot.

The mechanics of the episode's time travel plot were worked out by Sharla Oliver, who had "spreadsheets with equations and everything" to work out when in time the team would be appearing. The writers also had to work out if it made sense in the series' continuity for the character Enoch to have met Neanderthals after they all loved a pitch for him to compare the series' characters to them. James Oliver felt that guest star Joel Stoffer "nailed the delivery of that line", and also revealed that the line "I can keep tempo" was adlibbed by Stoffer on set. Another moment that the writers spent a "decent" amount of time working out was when Yo-Yo picks up a diviner, which was shown in season two to turn humans to stone and light-up when touched by Inhumans. Since Yo-Yo has prosthetic arms, the writers decided to have her touch it to her cheek to show it lighting-up then.

=== Design ===
==== Costumes ====
Costume designer Jessica Torok re-imagined the costumes for Jiaying to give her a "softer" look than she had in the second season. Torok used fabric from Ragfinders of California, a fabric warehouse in Los Angeles, to make Jiaying's dresses for the episode.

==== Title sequence ====
Like previous episodes of the seventh season, a new title card was introduced in the episode. The sequence features the series' logo in bright blue as it "travels across a black digital landscape made up of an orange and blue grid". The background also features coordinates, dates, and ticking clocks, which Ian Cardona from Comic Book Resources felt evoked Back to the Future (1985). Cardona thought the entire sequence was a tribute to the film Tron (1982), and helped "emphasize the nature" of racing against the clock.

=== Casting ===
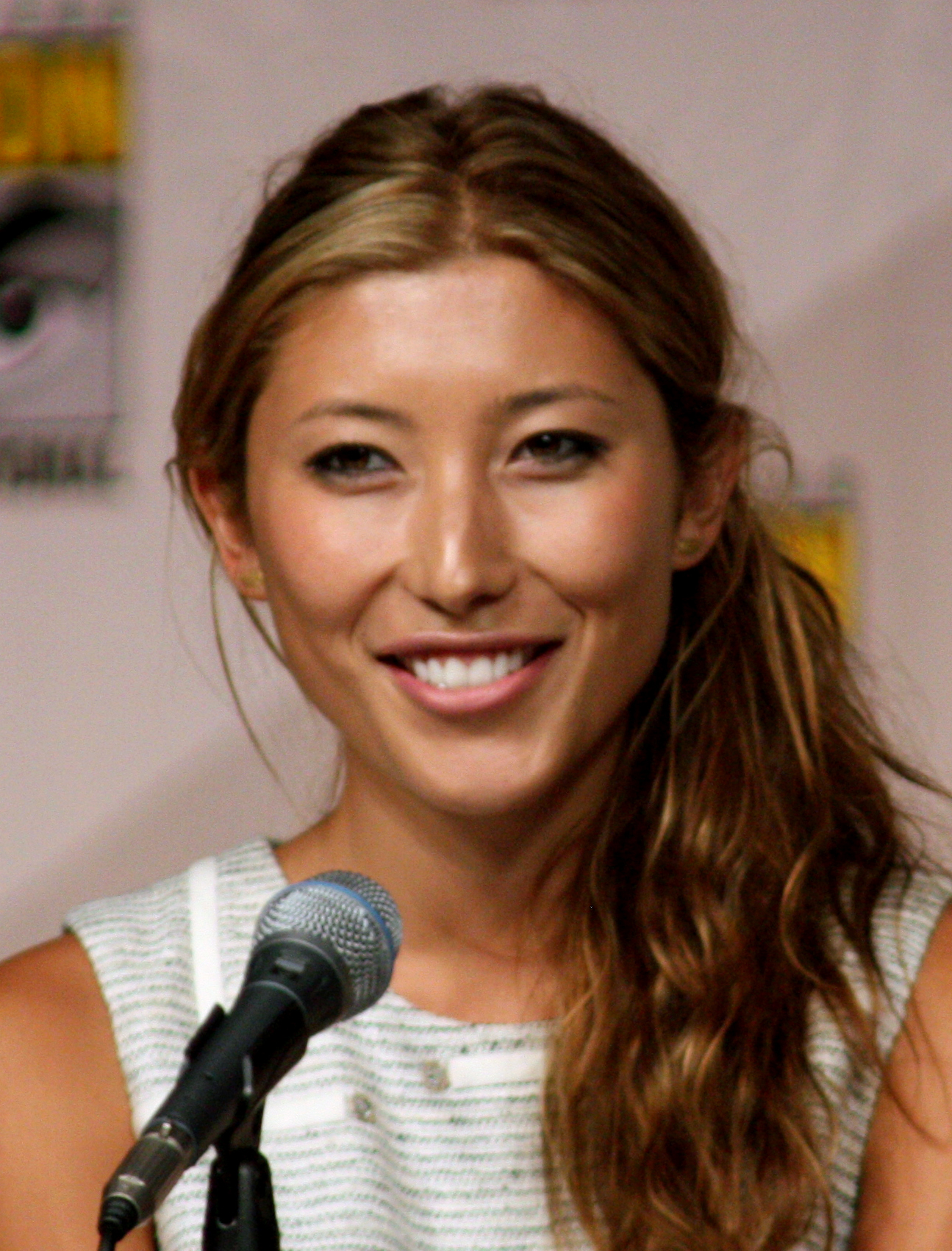
Dichen Lachman returns to star in this episode, reprising her role as Jiaying from season two

With the season renewal, main cast members Ming-Na Wen, Chloe Bennet, Elizabeth Henstridge, Henry Simmons, Natalia Cordova-Buckley, and Jeff Ward were confirmed to be returning from previous seasons as Melinda May, Daisy Johnson / Quake, Jemma Simmons, Alphonso "Mack" Mackenzie, Elena "Yo-Yo" Rodriguez, and Deke Shaw, respectively. Series star Clark Gregg also returns as his character Phil Coulson, portraying a Life Model Decoy version of the character in the seventh season.

Enver Gjokaj reprises his Agent Carter role of agent Daniel Sousa in "After, Before", guest starring along with Joel Stoffer as Enoch and Thomas E. Sullivan as Nathaniel Malick, all returning from past episodes in the season, and Dichen Lachman, reprising her role as Daisy's mother Jiaying from season two. Also guest starring are Dianne Doan as Kora, Daisy's previously unknown sister, and Byron Mann as Li. The writers referred to Li's ability to manifest knives as "Blade pact warlock", a reference to Dungeons & Dragons. Doan was cast as Kora while she was filming the series Warrior in Cape Town, South Africa. Doan had a costume fitting as soon as she returned to Los Angeles after that series was completed, followed by her first day of shooting the next day. She called the quick process of joining the series "insane". Additionally, Sophia Rabe-Martinez portrays a young Yo-Yo in the flashback sequences, while Fin Argus appears as a young Gordon, an Inhuman working with Jiaying who was portrayed by Philip Labe in the second season; Jamie Harris portrayed the character as an adult.

=== Filming ===
Director Eli Gonda utilized more handheld shots for scenes on the Zephyr to create a "frenetic energy" to help differentiate it from the scenes at Afterlife. Because the visuals for the season had yet to be established when the episode was filming, the time jumps were shot in multiple ways, such as manually shaking the camera and changing the frame rate, to ensure there were enough options to use the scenes once the visual style was determined.

=== Visual effects ===
FuseFX provided the visual effects for the flying in the episode. The sequence where the Quinjet docks with the Zephyr after the latter appears in front of the former was described by visual effects supervisor Mark Kolpack as "a moment of beauty and skill for May and one to remember just how incredible of a pilot she is". The sequence was meant to be a callback to previous seasons where May had been "famously cool", and was storyboarded by Kolpack before the effects were created. The earlier moment when the Quinjet detaches from the Zephyr was based on a similar sequence from the series' third season, while the shot of the Quinjet landing at Afterlife re-used a background plate from the third season. The length of the background plate was too short and required the Quinjet landing to be faster than usual.

Kolpack said the end of the episode, where Yo-Yo is able to use her abilities again, was "an awesome moment and game changer" for the character. He explained that her abilities are intended to be unique to her compared to other "speedster" characters, and are achieved by filming Cordova-Buckley at 120 frames per second to show her in slow motion. Latent images of the character are then added back into each shot with a "decay process" added to them using the Houdini software. Houdini is also used to add trailing particles and impacts underneath the character's feet. The scene in which Coulson is woken up while his new body is being printed was created by filming a take with Gregg and then a take with the bed empty, then visual effects were used to remove his lower half, replace it with a digital lower half that is being printed, and to add the lasers that are printing him.

== Release ==
"After, Before" was first aired in the United States on ABC on July 15, 2020.

== Reception ==
=== Ratings ===
In the United States the episode received a 0.3 percent share among adults between the ages of 18 and 49, meaning that it was seen by 0.3 percent of all households in that demographic. It was watched by 1.38 million viewers. Within a week of release, "After, Before" was watched by 2.46 million viewers.

=== Critical response ===
Kate Kulzick at The A.V. Club gave the episode a "B", calling "After, Before" "the most subdued episode of the season thus far", adding the small character moments of the team still on the Zephyr "are among the episode's best, their quiet reflection an effective contrast with the action at Afterlife." Christian Holub from Entertainment Weekly also giving the episode a "B". Giving the episode 3.5 stars out of 5, Michael Ahr from Den of Geek thought the May and Yo-Yo pairing served "as a great counterpoint" to Mack and Deke's "goofier adventure" in the last episode. Ahr was intrigued by the revelation that Daisy has a sister, and that May could meet up with Jiaying again in a future episode. However, he called Yo-Yo's path to regaining her powers "convoluted" and added that Nathaniel Malick was a "lackluster" villain, "employing a kind of casual evil that presents his personal interest as a foregone conclusion to everyone while mostly ignoring the implications for both Hydra and S.H.I.E.L.D." Syfy Wire's Trent Moore felt the time travel of the two stories in the episode were used "to maximum effect". He highlighted Sousa's addition to the team and felt it was "a shame" he was only around for the final season, and pointed out that Nathaniel Malick recruiting a team of Inhumans appeared "to be the antagonistic thread" for the remainder of the season. Wesley Coburn from Bam! Smack! Pow! said the "dire stakes, imminent doom and claustrophobic nature of being cramped on a plane are very reminiscent of" the season one episode "FZZT". He concluded that "things are coming full circle" and the episode "was a heartbreaking thrill ride filled with important character moments," giving the episode an "A+".
