= Kevin Feige =

American producer and studio executive (born 1973)

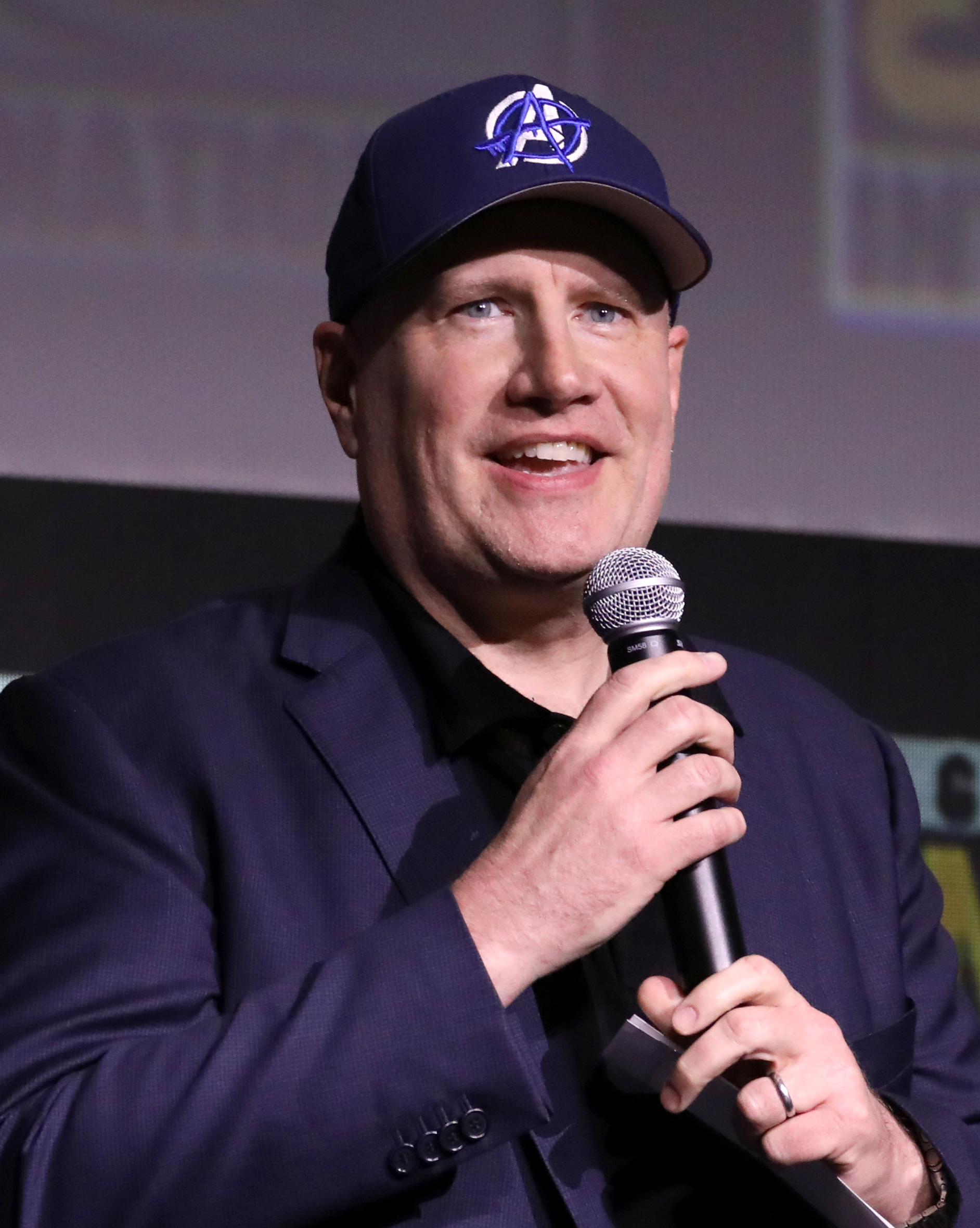
- Feige at the 2024 San Diego Comic-Con
- Born: June 2, 1973 (age 53); Boston, Massachusetts, U.S.
- Education: University of Southern California (BFA)
- Occupations: Producer; studio executive
- Years active: 1997–present
- Employer: The Walt Disney Company
- Notable work: Marvel Cinematic Universe
- Title: President, Marvel Studios; Chief Creative Officer, Marvel
- Spouse: Caitlin Feige (m. c. 2007)
- Children: 2

Kevin Feige (/ˈfaɪɡi/ FY-ghee; born June 2, 1973) is an American film and television producer. He has been the president of Marvel Studios and the primary producer of the Marvel Cinematic Universe (MCU) franchise since 2007. The films he has produced have a combined worldwide box office gross of over $32 billion, making him the highest grossing producer of all time, with Avengers: Endgame (2019) becoming the highest-grossing film.

Feige is a member of the Producers Guild of America. In 2018, he was nominated for the Academy Award for Best Picture for producing Black Panther, the first superhero film to receive that honor and the first film in the MCU to win an Academy Award. In October 2019, he became the chief creative officer of Marvel Entertainment.

== Early life ==
Feige was born in Boston, Massachusetts, and raised in Westfield, New Jersey, the son of Maralyn and Tim Feige. He moved to New Jersey at the age of three and lived there until the age of eighteen, when he graduated from Westfield High School. His maternal grandfather, Robert E. Short, was a television producer in the 1950s, working on soap operas including The Guiding Light and As the World Turns.

After high school, Feige attended the University of Southern California, the alma mater of his favorite directors: George Lucas, Ron Howard and Robert Zemeckis. His first five applications to the USC School of Cinematic Arts were rejected, but he was accepted on the sixth, studying in their Division of Film & Television Production. He graduated in 1995 with a degree in film, receiving an honorary doctorate in 2023.

== Career ==
His early work includes being assistant to executive producer Lauren Shuler Donner on the films Volcano (1997) and You've Got Mail (1998). On the first X-Men film, released in 2000, Donner made Feige an associate producer due to his knowledge of the Marvel Universe. Impressing Avi Arad, Feige was hired to work as a producer at Marvel Studios and as Arad's second-in-command that same year. In the mid-2000s, Feige realized that although the characters Spider-Man, Blade, and the X-Men had been respectively licensed to the film companies Sony Pictures, New Line Cinema, and 20th Century Fox, Marvel still owned the film rights to the core members of the Avengers. He envisioned creating a shared universe just as creators Stan Lee and Jack Kirby had done with their comic books in the early 1960s. Feige was named the president of production at Marvel Studios in March 2007, replacing the studio's president Michael Helfant. Following the successful opening weekend of Marvel's film Iron Man in May 2008, Feige was promoted to president of Marvel Studios.

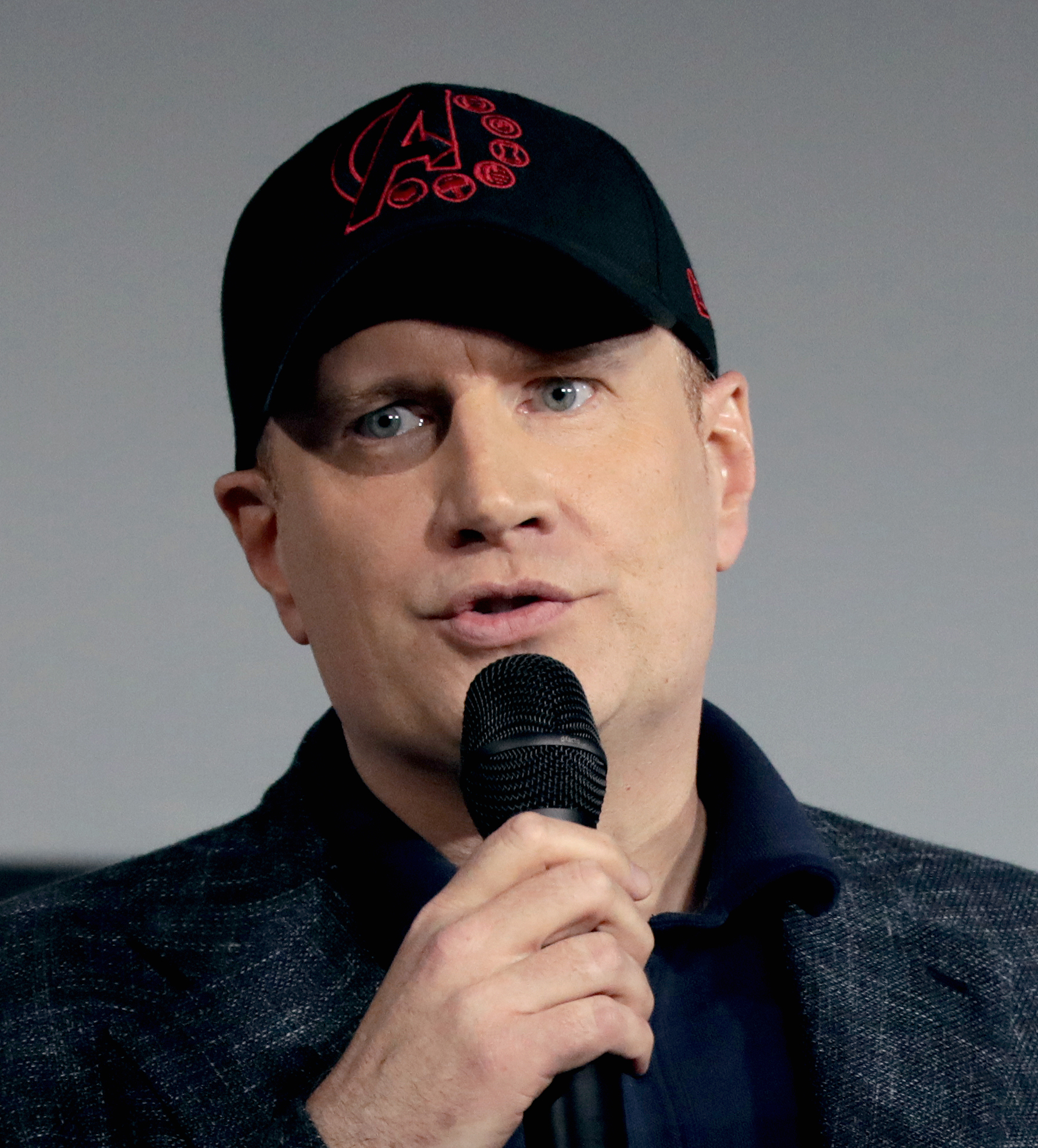
Feige at the 2019 San Diego Comic-Con

Feige received the Motion Picture Showman of the Year award at the International Cinematographers Guild's Publicists Guild Awards on February 22, 2013. For his work on Black Panther (2018), Feige received nominations for an Academy Award, a Golden Globe Award, and a Producers Guild of America Award. Feige was awarded the David O. Selznick Achievement Award in Theatrical Motion Pictures by the Producers Guild of America in 2019. In September 2019, it was reported that Feige was developing a Star Wars film for Lucasfilm, which was no longer in development by March 2023. In October 2019, Feige, in addition to being president of Marvel Studios, was named chief creative officer for Marvel Entertainment, Marvel Comics, Marvel Television, and Marvel Animation.

In November 2025, Feige gave an endowment to his alma mater to establish the Kevin Feige Division of Film & Television Production at the USC School of Cinematic Arts. USC called the endowment "transformational" and said it would "provide a lasting source of funding for faculty, students and programmatic support" of the Feige Division.

== Personal life ==
Feige married Caitlin, a cardiothoracic nurse, around 2007. They have two children: a daughter born in 2009, and a son in 2012.

== Filmography ==
=== Film ===
As producer
Year	Title	Status
2008	Iron Man	
2008	The Incredible Hulk	
2010	Iron Man 2	
2011	Thor	
2011	Captain America: The First Avenger	
2012	The Avengers	
2013	Iron Man 3	
2013	Thor: The Dark World	
2014	Captain America: The Winter Soldier	
2014	Guardians of the Galaxy	
2015	Avengers: Age of Ultron	
2015	Ant-Man	
2016	Captain America: Civil War	
2016	Doctor Strange	
2017	Guardians of the Galaxy Vol. 2	
2017	Spider-Man: Homecoming	
2017	Thor: Ragnarok	
2018	Black Panther	
2018	Avengers: Infinity War	
2018	Ant-Man and the Wasp	
2019	Captain Marvel	
2019	Avengers: Endgame	
2019	Spider-Man: Far From Home	
2021	Black Widow	
2021	Shang-Chi and the Legend of the Ten Rings	
2021	Eternals	
2021	Spider-Man: No Way Home	
2022	Doctor Strange in the Multiverse of Madness	
2022	Thor: Love and Thunder	
2022	Black Panther: Wakanda Forever	
2023	Ant-Man and the Wasp: Quantumania	
2023	Guardians of the Galaxy Vol. 3	
2023	The Marvels	
2024	Deadpool & Wolverine	
2025	Captain America: Brave New World	
2025	Thunderbolts*	
2025	The Fantastic Four: First Steps	
2026	Spider-Man: Brand New Day	
2026	Avengers: Doomsday †	Post-production

Key
†	Denotes films that have not yet been released

Other roles
Year	Title	Role
1997	Volcano	Production assistant
1998	You've Got Mail	Production assistant
2000	X-Men	Associate producer
2002	Spider-Man	Associate producer
2003	Daredevil	Co-producer
2003	X2	Co-producer
2003	Hulk	Executive producer
2004	The Punisher	Executive producer
2004	Spider-Man 2	Executive producer
2005	Elektra	Co-producer
2005	Man-Thing	Executive producer
2005	Fantastic Four	Executive producer
2006	X-Men: The Last Stand	Executive producer
2007	Spider-Man 3	Executive producer
2007	Fantastic Four: Rise of the Silver Surfer	Executive producer
2008	Next Avengers: Heroes of Tomorrow	Executive producer
2008	Punisher: War Zone	Executive producer
2009	Hulk Versus	Executive producer
2011	Thor: Tales of Asgard	Executive producer
2012	The Amazing Spider-Man	Executive producer

=== Television ===
As executive producer unless otherwise noted
Year	Title	Notes
2009	Wolverine and the X-Men	26 episodes
2009–2012	Iron Man: Armored Adventures	52 episodes
2015–2016	Agent Carter	18 episodes
2020	The Simpsons	Voice of Chinnos only (Episode: "Bart the Bad Guy")
2021	WandaVision	9 episodes
2021	The Falcon and the Winter Soldier	6 episodes
2021–2023	Loki	12 episodes
2021–2024	What If...?	26 episodes
2021	Hawkeye	6 episodes
2022	Moon Knight	6 episodes
2022	Ms. Marvel	6 episodes
2022	She-Hulk: Attorney at Law	9 episodes
2022	Werewolf by Night	Television special
2022	The Guardians of the Galaxy Holiday Special	Television special
2023	Secret Invasion	6 episodes
2024	Echo	5 episodes
2024–present	X-Men '97	19 episodes; renewed for a third and fourth season
2024	Agatha All Along	9 episodes
2025–present	Your Friendly Neighborhood Spider-Man	10 episodes; renewed for a second and third season
2025–present	Daredevil: Born Again	17 episodes; renewed for a third season
2025	Ironheart	6 episodes
2025	Eyes of Wakanda	4 episodes
2025–present	Marvel Zombies	4 episodes; renewed for a second season
2026	Wonder Man	8 episodes
2026	The Punisher: One Last Kill	Television special
2026	VisionQuest	8 episodes; streaming

Key
†	Denotes television productions that have not yet been released

=== Shorts ===
As producer
Year	Title	Notes
2011	The Consultant	Marvel One-Shot film
2011	A Funny Thing Happened on the Way to Thor's Hammer	Marvel One-Shot film
2012	Item 47	Marvel One-Shot film
2013	Agent Carter	Marvel One-Shot film
2014	All Hail the King	Marvel One-Shot film
2016	Team Thor	Mockumentary film; co-produced with Taika Waititi and Brad Winderbaum
2017	Team Thor: Part 2	Mockumentary film; co-produced with Taika Waititi and Brad Winderbaum
2018	Team Darryl	Mockumentary film; co-produced with Taika Waititi and Brad Winderbaum
2022–2023	I Am Groot	10-episode series

== Awards and nominations ==
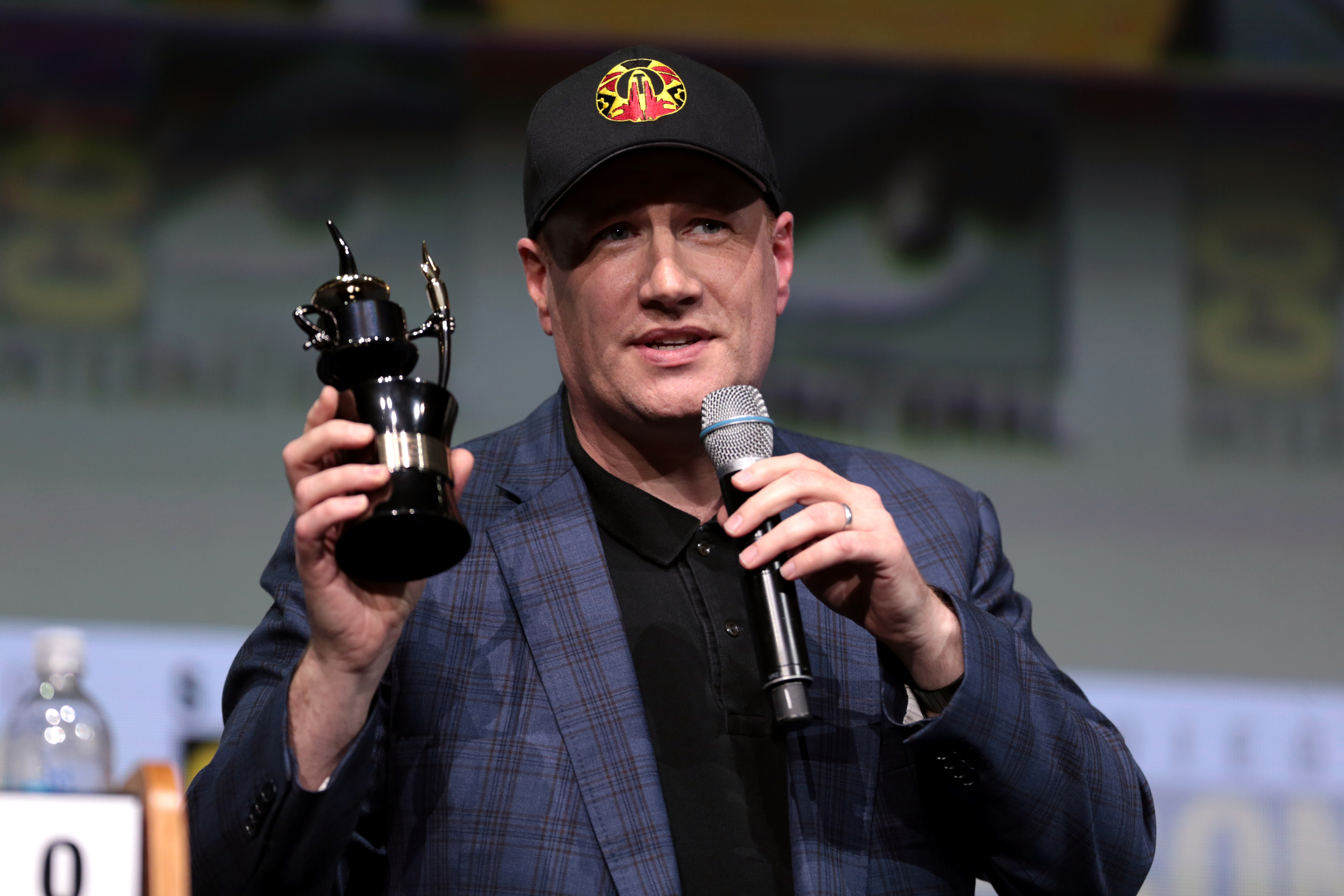
Feige receiving the Inkpot Award at the 2017 San Diego Comic-Con

Awards and nominations received by Kevin Feige
Award	Year	Nominated work	Category	Result	Ref.
Academy Awards	2019	Black Panther	Best Picture	Nominated	
Britannia Awards	2018	—N/a	Worldwide Contribution to Entertainment	Won	
Children's and Family Emmy Awards	2023	The Guardians of the Galaxy Holiday Special	Outstanding Fiction Special	Won	
Children's and Family Emmy Awards	2023	I Am Groot	Outstanding Short Form Program	Won	
Children's and Family Emmy Awards	2025	I Am Groot	Outstanding Short Form Animated Program	Nominated	
Inkpot Award	2017	—N/a	Inkpot Award	Won	
Critics' Choice Television Awards	2022	What If...?	Best Animated Series	Won	
Critics' Choice Television Awards	2022	WandaVision	Best Movie/Miniseries	Nominated	
Critics' Choice Television Awards	2024	Loki	Best Drama Series	Nominated	
Golden Globe Awards	2019	Black Panther	Best Motion Picture – Drama	Nominated	
Gotham TV Awards	2024	X-Men '97	Breakthrough Drama Series	Nominated	
Grammy Awards	2024	Guardians of the Galaxy: Awesome Mix, Vol. 3	Best Compilation Soundtrack for Visual Media	Nominated	
Hollywood Film Awards	2019	Avengers: Endgame	Hollywood Blockbuster Award	Won	
Primetime Emmy Awards	2021	WandaVision	Outstanding Limited or Anthology Series	Nominated	
Primetime Emmy Awards	2022	What If...?	Outstanding Animated Program	Nominated	
Primetime Emmy Awards	2024	X-Men '97	Outstanding Animated Program	Nominated	
Producers Guild of America Awards	2019	—N/a	David O. Selznick Achievement Award in Theatrical Motion Pictures	Won	
Producers Guild of America Awards	2019	Black Panther	Outstanding Producer of Theatrical Motion Pictures	Nominated	
Producers Guild of America Awards	2022	WandaVision	Outstanding Producer of Limited or Anthology Series Television	Nominated	
Producers Guild of America Awards	2023	Black Panther: Wakanda Forever	Outstanding Producer of Theatrical Motion Pictures	Nominated	
Saturn Awards	2019	—N/a	Stan Lee World Builder Award	Won	

In July 2024, Feige received a star on the Hollywood Walk of Fame.
