= As I Have Always Been =

- Agents of S.H.I.E.L.D. episode
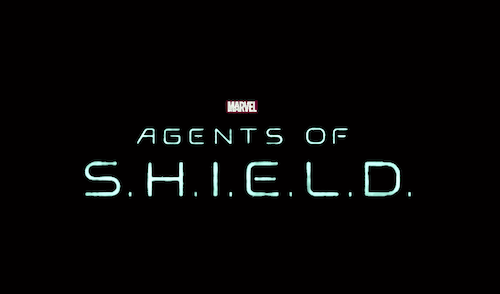
- The series' logo appears twice during the episode due to its time loop story
- Episode no.: Season 7 Episode 9
- Directed by: Elizabeth Henstridge
- Written by: Drew Z. Greenberg
- Cinematography by: Allan Westbrook
- Editing by: Kelly Stuyvesant
- Original air date: July 22, 2020
- Running time: 42 minutes

Guest appearances
- Joel Stoffer as Enoch; Enver Gjokaj as Daniel Sousa

Episode chronology
← Previous "After, Before"	Next → "Stolen"
- Agents of S.H.I.E.L.D. season 7

"As I Have Always Been" is the ninth episode of the seventh season of the American television series Agents of S.H.I.E.L.D. Based on the Marvel Comics organization S.H.I.E.L.D., it follows a Life Model Decoy (LMD) of Phil Coulson and his team of S.H.I.E.L.D. agents as they are caught in a time storm, causing a time loop. It is set in the Marvel Cinematic Universe (MCU) and acknowledges the franchise's films. The episode was written by Drew Z. Greenberg and directed by series regular Elizabeth Henstridge in her directorial debut.

Clark Gregg reprises his role as Coulson from the film series, starring alongside Ming-Na Wen, Chloe Bennet, Elizabeth Henstridge, Henry Simmons, Natalia Cordova-Buckley, and Jeff Ward. Before her directorial efforts, Henstridge began shadowing other directors on the series beginning in the third season after expressing interest in directing to ABC beforehand. Henstridge's directing for the time loop story was inspired by other series and films featuring similar plots, such as Russian Doll and Groundhog Day (1993). Due to its time loop nature, the episode features minimal visual effects, as it repeats the series' logo and reuses visual effects shots throughout. It also features the death of long-time recurring guest character Enoch (Joel Stoffer).

"As I Have Always Been" originally aired on ABC on July 22, 2020, and was watched by 1.28 million viewers. The episode received critical acclaim and was regarded as one of the series' best. Critics praised Henstridge's direction, its balance of humor and emotional weight, and the performances of Gregg, Bennet, and Stoffer.

== Plot ==
Following the events of "After, Before", the S.H.I.E.L.D. agents become trapped in a time vortex and a time loop. Being the only ones who can still remember everything that has happened throughout the multiple loops, Daisy Johnson and Phil Coulson attempt to figure out how to save everyone while ensuring the former does not die at the risk of losing her memories. Johnson and Coulson learn that Jemma Simmons' memories are suppressed by a brain implant designed to prevent her from remembering Leo Fitz's location. When Johnson attempts to remove the implant, she and Simmons are killed by a gas leak caused by a saboteur.

After Coulson brings Johnson up to speed in the next time loop, the pair try to remove Simmons' implant again. However, Johnson deduces someone tampered with the surgical instrument used for the procedure. Daniel Sousa volunteers to test if the device has been booby-trapped to prevent Johnson's memories from being erased and ends up poisoned. In the next loop, Johnson confronts Sousa, whom she always finds sleeping next to her healing chamber. Sousa admits he is attracted to strong women and sees himself as someone who can help them up when they are down. In the following loop, Johnson kisses Sousa. Meanwhile, Coulson deduces that the saboteur is the team's Chronicom ally Enoch, who has been unwittingly programmed to prevent the brain implant's removal at all costs. After several unsuccessful attempts, the S.H.I.E.L.D. agents subdue Enoch and remove Simmons' implant, causing her to instantly remember that Enoch's electrochron displacement mechanism can repair the time drive before collapsing into tears.

In the final loop before they will collapse into the vortex, the team approach Enoch, who willingly gives up the mechanism despite knowing it will kill him. As he dies, he reflects that he did not understand friendship or loneliness before joining the S.H.I.E.L.D. agents and tells Johnson and Coulson that this will be their final mission as a team. The time drive is repaired, and the agents escape the vortex. Concurrently, having taken over Afterlife in the 1980s, Nathaniel Malick helps the Inhuman Kora control her powers.

== Production ==
=== Development ===
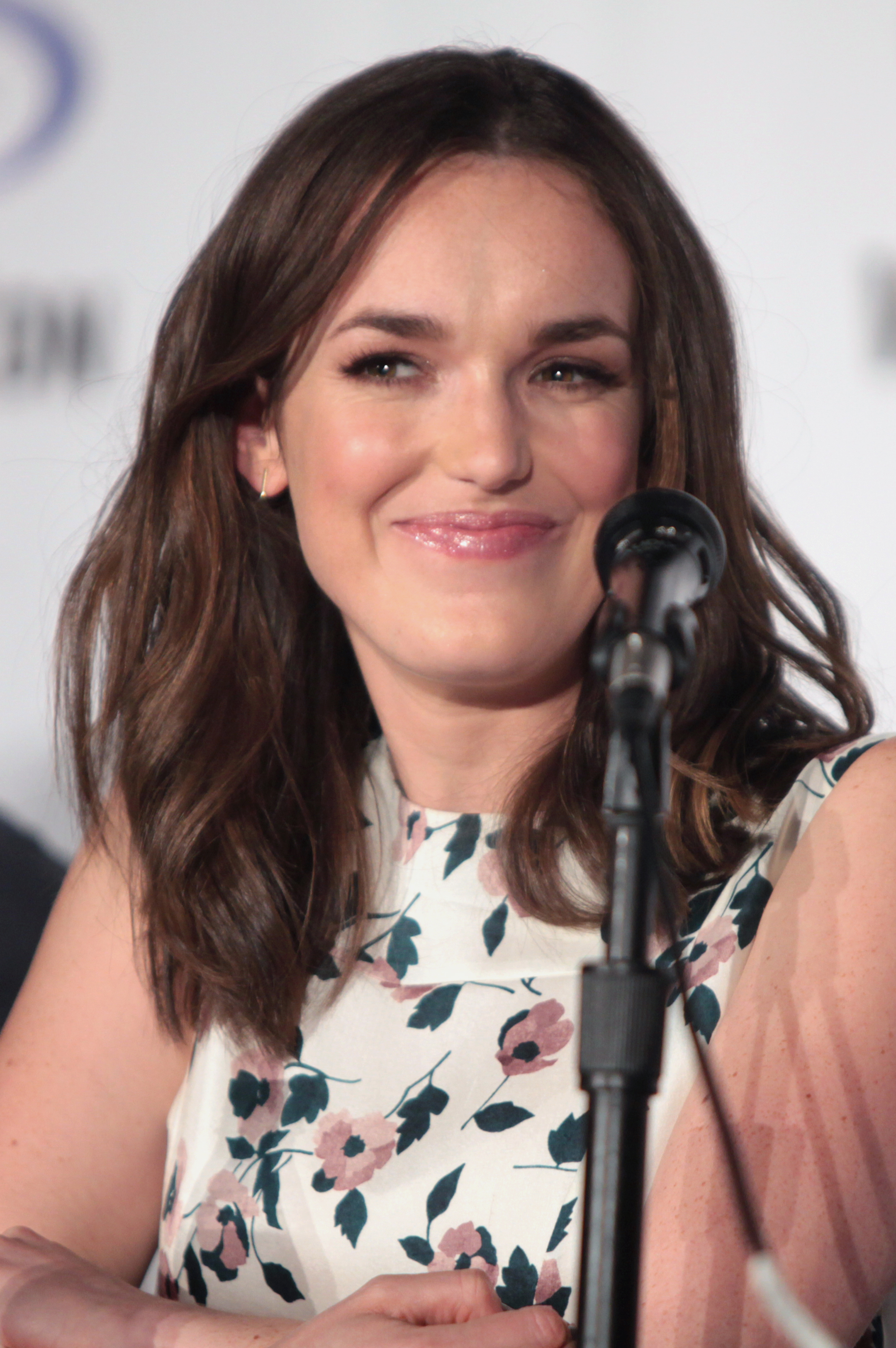
Star Elizabeth Henstridge directed the episode, which was her directorial debut

After the sixth season finale of Agents of S.H.I.E.L.D. aired in August 2019, showrunners Jed Whedon, Maurissa Tancharoen, and Jeffrey Bell revealed that the seventh season would feature the team trying to save the world from invasion by the Chronicoms. They used time travel to do this, allowing the season to explore the history of S.H.I.E.L.D. Later that month, one of the season's episodes was revealed to be titled "As I Have Always Been" and written by Drew Z. Greenberg. That November, series regular Elizabeth Henstridge was revealed to have directed the episode, making her directorial debut. It was confirmed to be the ninth episode of the season in July 2020.

While acting on Agents of S.H.I.E.L.D., Henstridge grew comfortable in the role and wanted to push herself by exploring other aspects of the industry. After admitting that directing was something she wanted to explore, Henstridge utilized ABC's shadowing program to pursue directing. She informally started inquiring about directing in season two, and began shadowing other directors on the series in the third season, learning from directors such as Jesse Bochco, Nina Lopez-Corrado, Garry A. Brown, Kevin Tancharoen, and fellow star Clark Gregg when he directed for the series in later seasons. Henstridge was told at the start of season seven that she would direct episode nine, with the writers giving her character Jemma Simmons a smaller role in the previous episode to allow time for Henstridge to prepare for "As I Have Always Been".

=== Writing ===
Henstridge did not learn her episode would feature a time loop until she was prepping the episode the week before filming. Knowing the season was jumping to different decades, Henstridge had anticipated her episode would be centered on a decade as past ones had been. With the focus of the episode on Phil Coulson and Daisy Johnson, Henstridge said the episode explores "some gorgeous, emotional, existential questions, but also a lot about their relationship. It's quite a healing episode, even though there are some really sad things that happen in it." She added that Daniel Sousa "has an integral role to play" in the episode. Speaking to Sousa and Daisy's kiss in the episode, Henstridge said since Sousa is "not one to necessarily talk about his feelings much", it offered some parallels to Agent Carter. She continued, "to have a man who is so supportive and in celebration of such strong women, was brilliant... We earned some really great moments of emotional revelation." There were several scenes that Greenberg knew he wanted to have in the script from the first time the episode's story was broken by the writers room: Daisy and Coulson talking about watching loved ones die; Sousa expressing his affection for "'people like' Daisy" and her realizing "how amazing he is because of it"; and Enoch's death scene.

The title of the episode comes from a line Enoch says as he is dying. Joel Stoffer, who portrays Enoch, learned that the character would die earlier in the season, and felt his end was fitting for the character because he "became an integral part of the team and had learned so much from them over the years that putting himself out there for them came very naturally to him. It was a great, honorable way to leave the show." Stoffer also appreciated that Enoch reveals important information during the scene when he tells Daisy that he has seen the future and the team's mission will be their last one together. Stoffer regretted that Leo Fitz could not be present for Enoch's death (due to cast member Iain De Caestecker being absent from the episode) since "a lot of the humor and a lot of the discovery that Enoch gets to put out there, was often bounced off of Fitz".

=== Casting ===
With the season renewal, main cast members Ming-Na Wen, Chloe Bennet, Henstridge, Henry Simmons, Natalia Cordova-Buckley, and Jeff Ward were confirmed to be returning from previous seasons as Melinda May, Daisy Johnson / Quake, Jemma Simmons, Alphonso "Mack" Mackenzie, Elena "Yo-Yo" Rodriguez, and Deke Shaw, respectively. Series star Clark Gregg also returns as his character Phil Coulson, portraying a Life Model Decoy version of the character. Enver Gjokaj reprises his Agent Carter role of agent Daniel Sousa, guest starring along with Joel Stoffer as Enoch. Thomas E. Sullivan and Dianne Doan appear uncredited as Nathaniel Malick and Kora, respectively. All guest stars reprise their roles from earlier in the season.

=== Filming ===
Henstridge said "As I Have Always Been" was "the best episode to direct" due to its focus on stars Gregg and Bennet, both of whom Henstridge is particularly close to off-screen and who had supported her efforts to start directing; she suspected the two being a focus in the episode was a factor in her getting to direct this episode. She added of the pair, "directing them was more of a treat than a task". Henstridge said the episode was "different than anything [the series has] done before" due to its time loop story structure, resulting in it being shot "in a whole new way". Block shooting was utilized for the episode, which means all the different scenes on a single set were shot in one direction, before moving the camera to shoot the other direction. Similar camera moves were repeated, as were "motifs of the camera work". She described directing the episode as a "steep learning curve", and prepared by watching other series and films that feature time loops such as Russian Doll, Groundhog Day (1993), and Run Lola Run (1998). Her biggest challenge with the time loop was finding ways to make the episode "fast-paced and interesting, because you're coming back to the same set a lot of the time." Greenberg decided early on that he wanted Act 5 of the episode, featuring Enoch's death, to be like a play, and he felt that Henstridge, Stoffer, Bennet, and Gregg made this work in the final scene.

=== Editing and visual effects ===
Kelly Stuyvesant served as editor on the episode, and Henstridge conceded that the episode relied "heavily on a fantastic editor". The title card for the episode uses the season five typeface logo, which appears twice in the episode due to the time loop. Wesley Coburn from Bam! Smack! Pow! called this idea "very clever". The time loop also led to visual effects shots being reused throughout the episode, such as the time storm which was a single shot created by FuseFX that is repeated several times. Visual effects supervisor Mark Kolpack explained that the episode was "super, super light" for visual effects, with the only other effects being the shot of Enoch as he is "quaked" away by Daisy, and Kora's superpowers in the episode's end tag. The latter were created by CoSA VFX, inspired by images of solar flares, and augmented with practical glass breaking.

== Release ==
"As I Have Always Been" was first aired in the United States on ABC on July 22, 2020.

== Reception ==
=== Ratings ===
In the United States the episode received a 0.3 percent share among adults between the ages of 18 and 49, meaning that it was seen by 0.3 percent of all households in that demographic. It was watched by 1.28 million viewers. Within a week of release, "As I Have Always Been" was watched by 2.35 million viewers.

=== Critical response ===
Awarding the episode an "A", Alex McLevy at The A.V. Club said "As I Have Always Been" "could 'stand toe-to-toe' with other well-known time loop episodes, calling it the best episode of the season so far and one of the best episodes of the series. He praised Henstridge's direction, feeling she brought an "excellent and light touch to material that could've easily gotten too precious by half". McLevy also enjoyed the payoffs to character developments during the various loops, particularly Coulson discussing his feelings as an LMD which "speaks to the complete series arc of experience for both" Coulson and Daisy, and Sousa's talk with Daisy. Trent Moore from Syfy Wire stated, "It's become par for the course for Agents of S.H.I.E.L.D. to have you laughing—then crying—within the same episode, but we've rarely laughed and cried quite so much as in this one. It's smart, twisty, and absolutely brutal. Often all at once." He added that the episode did "a fantastic job of balancing the world-saving stakes and humor of trial and error" and called Enoch's death "a brutal, heartbreaking scene", saying the character had "a fitting heroic end". Writing for Den of Geek, Michael Ahr felt time loop episode could be "a dangerous prospect" but "As I Have Always Been" does "everything right, from varying the camera angles to break up the duplicate scenes to pausing for reflection with both comedic and tragic results." He enjoyed the episode not dwelling on the mechanics of Daisy and Coulson being aware of the time loop, and felt Daisy's memory getting erased when she died "was a nice touch that lent a uniqueness to what could easily have been a derivative sci-fi formula". Ahr gave the episode 4.5 stars out of 5. Bam! Smack! Pow!'s Wesley Coburn gave the episode an "A+", saying it was "a wild, heartbreaking ride, combining elements of Groundhog Day, The Good Place, and Final Destination into one of the most impactful closing scenes ever."

=== Accolades ===
Stoffer was named TVLine's "Performer of the Week" for the week of July 20, 2020, for his performance in this episode. The site highlighted the evolution of Enoch since his introduction in the fifth season, and praised Stoffer for making the character his own which made his death scene so powerful: "We hung on his every measured, soft-spoken word, marveling at how this robot had become so attuned to human ways." The site also noted the "funny", murderous take on the character earlier in the episode.
