= Team Thor =

2016–2018 Marvel Studios short films

- The title card for the first short
- Directed by: Taika Waititi
- Screenplay by: Taika Waititi
- Based on: Characters published by Marvel Comics
- Produced by: Taika Waititi; Brad Winderbaum; Kevin Feige
- Starring: Chris Hemsworth; Daley Pearson; Mark Ruffalo; Jeff Goldblum
- Edited by: Joel Negron
- Production company: Marvel Studios
- Distributed by: Walt Disney Studios; Home Entertainment
- Release date: 2016–2018
- Running time: 3–6 minutes
- Country: United States
- Language: English

Team Thor is a series of American direct-to-video mockumentary short films produced by Marvel Studios, featuring characters from the Marvel Cinematic Universe (MCU). Initially released from 2016 to 2018, they were included as special features in the MCU films' Blu-ray and digital distribution releases and are the sixth through eighth Marvel One-Shot short films. The series consists of Team Thor, Team Thor: Part 2, and Team Darryl, all written and directed by Taika Waititi.

Chris Hemsworth reprises his role as Thor in the first two films, in which he moves in with a new roommate, Darryl Jacobson (Daley Pearson), during the events of Captain America: Civil War (2016). Mark Ruffalo also appears in the first film as Bruce Banner, while Jeff Goldblum appears in the third as the Grandmaster, whom Darryl lives with after moving to Los Angeles. Filming for Team Thor occurred one month before the start of filming on Thor: Ragnarok (2017) and was done to introduce MCU fans to the irreverent tone of Ragnarok.

The shorts were praised for their humor and Hemsworth's performance. They were made available on Disney+ in January 2022, at which point Marvel classified them as One-Shots.

== Development ==
Team Thor was filmed one month before Thor: Ragnarok (2017) began filming in July 2016. It is a mockumentary, similar to director Taika Waititi's film What We Do in the Shadows (2014). Before Team Thor was released, many fans were unsure of Waititi's new tonal approach for Ragnarok. Waititi felt Team Thor "helped us a lot" by giving fans the opportunity to see "just how irreverent we were gonna be, and just how different we were making Thor, and [Bruce] Banner as well". In September 2016, Waititi said Darryl Jacobson would probably be seen again, adding that there may be "other little pieces of [Team Thor] that may just be a small part of a bigger thing".

In October 2017, Marvel Studios President Kevin Feige stated that he saw the shorts as a "doable" version of their previous Marvel One-Shots shorts series, and felt that they "in some parts helped redefine Thor into what he's become in Ragnarok in a fun way." As well, Jeff Goldblum, who portrays the Grandmaster in Thor: Ragnarok, stated he had shot footage with Waititi for another short, which became Team Darryl. The three shorts were made available on Disney+ in January 2022, at which point Marvel classified them as One-Shots.

== Films ==
Short film series in the Marvel Cinematic Universe
Film	U.S. release date		Director & Screenwriter	Producer	Home media release
Film	Digital	Physical	Director & Screenwriter	Producer	Home media release
Team Thor	August 28, 2016	September 13, 2016	Taika Waititi	Kevin Feige	Captain America: Civil War
Team Thor: Part 2	February 14, 2017	February 28, 2017	Taika Waititi	Kevin Feige	Doctor Strange
Team Darryl	February 20, 2018	March 6, 2018	Taika Waititi	Kevin Feige	Thor: Ragnarok

=== Team Thor (2016) ===
After saving Earth with the Avengers, Thor takes a short break in Australia where he lives with a local office worker, Darryl Jacobson. As he does this, he is interviewed by a film crew and talks about his daily life in Australia. Thor is seen visiting a kindergarten classroom, attempting to send emails with Darryl's help to Tony Stark and Steve Rogers concerning their conflict, (Note: As seen in Captain America: Civil War (2016)) and revealing his investigative board concerning the connections between the Infinity Stones, the Avengers, Nick Fury, and Thanos. Later, Thor meets Bruce Banner at a café regarding not being contacted by Stark and Rogers. Banner receives a phone call from Stark, who does not appear to want to reach out or talk to Thor. As such, Thor decides to start his own team, Team Thor, with him and Darryl.

Team Thor was first screened at the 2016 San Diego Comic-Con, before being released online on August 28, 2016. It was also released on the digital home media of Captain America: Civil War (2016) in September 2016. The film is also known as While You Were Fighting: A Thor Mockumentary. The mockumentary was said to have been produced by the "New Zealand Film Board", and its title card features a grainy, VHS-style logo of Captain America: Civil War with "Team Thor" "crudely put over it". Chris Hemsworth and Mark Ruffalo reprise their Marvel Cinematic Universe (MCU) roles as Thor and Bruce Banner, respectively, with Daley Pearson appearing as Thor's Australian flatmate Darryl Jacobson. The film was referred to as Team Thor: Part 1 with its release on Disney+ in January 2022.

=== Team Thor: Part 2 (2017) ===
Continuing from the first mockumentary, Thor and his roommate Darryl discuss their domestic responsibilities at their apartment, with Darryl being stuck with most of the cleaning. Darryl then proceeds to state how Thor is a nice person but out of touch with time, and becomes frustrated with Thor's attempts to pay rent with Asgardian currency. He suggests Thor look for a job, which Thor laughs at and counters by suggesting they get a servant. Additional footage from Thor's visit to the kindergarten classroom is shown. The interview ends with Thor feeling he does not need anyone else in his life besides Darryl, and suggests that Darryl get a superhero outfit.

Team Thor: Part 2 was released on the home media of Doctor Strange (2016) in February 2017, with Hemsworth and Pearson both returning. The film is also known as Team Thor: Part 2, Where Are They Now?

=== Team Darryl (2018) ===
After Thor moved out of Darryl's apartment, Darryl moves to Los Angeles and becomes roommates with the Grandmaster, the only person who responded to his ads. The Grandmaster believes Darryl would be a good replacement assistant and various clips are shown of Darryl performing menial tasks for the Grandmaster, such as taking out the trash and driving him around. Darryl goes on to describe how the Grandmaster seems like a good person but has issues understanding Darryl's personal space and has his own anger issues. The Grandmaster states he has grown accustomed to Earth and plans to take it over, with Darryl standing at his side. He creates a video explaining his plan and posts it to the internet. However, after receiving no views, he plans to advertise the first video by posting a second video with a musical guest. He hires Darryl's friends to help him but melts one of them when his expectations are not met. Darryl confesses he is unsure if the Grandmaster also wants to melt him, and admits he misses Thor as his roommate.

Team Darryl was released on digital download for Thor: Ragnarok on February 20, 2018, and on Blu-ray on March 6. Pearson reprises his role as Darryl and is joined by Jeff Goldblum as the Grandmaster. It is set after the events of Thor: Ragnarok and is a continuation from the film's post-credits scene.

== Cast and characters ==
Character	Films		
Character	Team Thor (2016)	Team Thor: Part 2 (2017)	Team Darryl (2018)
Bruce Banner	Mark Ruffalo		
Grandmaster			Jeff Goldblum
Darryl Jacobson	Daley Pearson	Daley Pearson	Daley Pearson
Thor	Chris Hemsworth	Chris Hemsworth	

== Reception ==
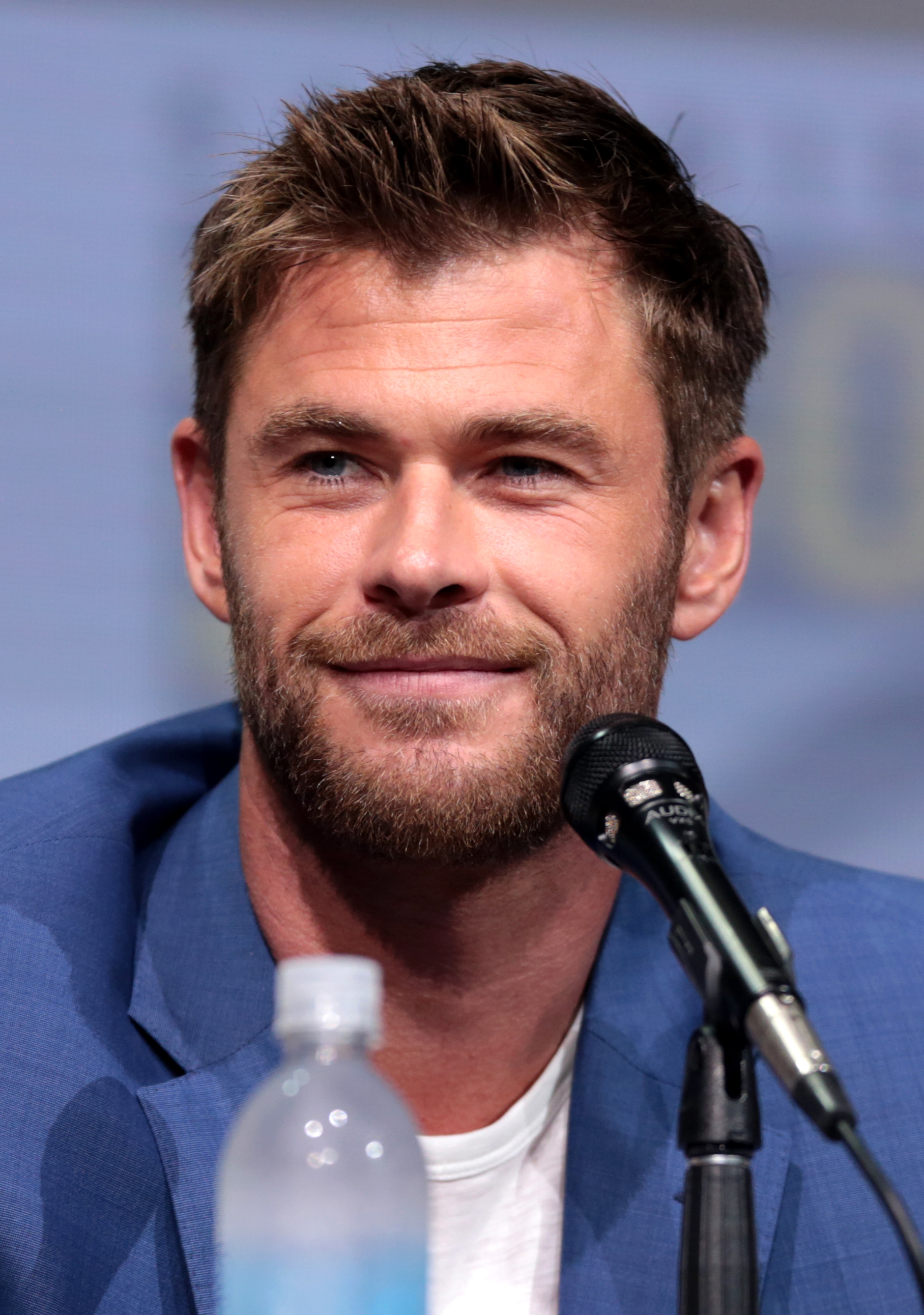
The comedic performance of Chris Hemsworth in the shorts was widely praised

Despite being "a silly little short", Ethan Anderton of /Film found Team Thor to be hilarious, as did Germain Lussier at io9, who felt Ragnarok would be amazing if it had "an iota of this humor". Anderton later added that similar short films like Team Thor would be a great replacement for the Marvel One-Shots. Collider's Tommy Cook and Adam Chitwood also enjoyed the short, with Cook feeling it "perfectly captured Waititi's irreverent sense of humor" and praised Hemsworth's comedic abilities, while Chitwood said there were "a number of really funny touches" and noted Hemsworth and Waititi were a good comedic fit. Ross A. Lincoln of Deadline Hollywood enjoyed the film and Hemsworth's comedy as well, calling it one of the biggest highlights from Marvel's Comic-Con panel and hoping that it served as a good indication for how Ragnarok would turn out. Don Kaye at Syfy Wire called Team Thor "one of the best movies Marvel has ever made".

In anticipation of Part 2 releasing, Nathalie Caron from Syfy Wire noted by its teaser that it was "using the same brand of humor that made the first... such a massive hit with fans everywhere". Writing for The Hollywood Reporter, Aaron Couch called Part 2 "the sequel no one could accuse of suffering from sequelitis". Alexandra August at Comic Book Resources called Team Darryl "just as hilarious as the Team Thor installments before it, if a little (way) more disturbing".

== Related content and future ==
In August 2018, Daley Pearson released a video reprising his role as Darryl to state he survived the Blip, as seen in Avengers: Infinity War (2018), and is forced to work weekends since many of his co-workers did not survive. He also wishes Thor a happy birthday and asks him if he can transfer any money, as Darryl is now in debt. In April 2019, Hemsworth expressed interest in doing more Team Thor short films, with the possibility of doing a television series. Pearson appears as Darryl in Thor: Love and Thunder (2022) as a New Asgard tour guide.
