= Maximiliano Hernández =

American actor

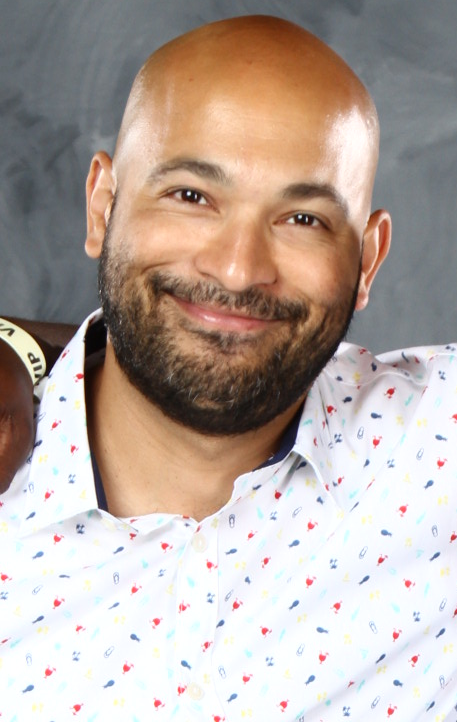
- Hernández at the Florida SuperCon, June 2015
- Born: September 12, 1973 (age 52); New York City, U.S.
- Occupation: Actor
- Years active: 1994–present

Maximiliano Hernández (born September 12, 1973) is an American actor. He is best known for portraying Agent Jasper Sitwell in the Marvel Cinematic Universe and FBI Agent Chris Amador in the first season of The Americans.

== Early life ==
A native of Brooklyn, New York of Honduran descent, Hernández began acting in high school. He briefly studied acting at the City College of New York and worked as a stage actor before moving to Los Angeles, California.

== Career ==
Early in his career, Hernández appeared in episodes of Law & Order, 24 and Numbers, as well as the film Hotel for Dogs. He had parts in the films Pride and Glory and Warrior, both from director Gavin O'Connor.

Hernández made brief appearances as the Marvel Comics character Jasper Sitwell in 2011's Thor, 2012's The Avengers, and 2019's Avengers: Endgame as part of the Marvel Cinematic Universe franchise. He reprised the role in the Marvel One-Shots short films The Consultant and Item 47, the first season of Agents of S.H.I.E.L.D., and the 2014 film Captain America: The Winter Soldier.

In 2013, Hernández appeared in the first season of The Americans as Chris Amador, an FBI agent. The project reunited him with Gavin O'Connor, who directed the pilot. Hernández exited the series in the ninth episode. Andy Greenwald of Grantland described Hernández's work in the series as "wonderful [...] making a fringe character both memorable and strangely noble in his limited screen time."

In 2015, Hernández portrayed a corrupt Sonora state policeman in Denis Villeneuve's crime action-thriller Sicario.

== Filmography ==
=== Film ===
Year	Title	Role	Notes
1999	Raw Nerve	Cross	
2000	The Yards	Bartender	
2006	Mentor	Club Rat	
2007	The Namesake	Ben	
2008	Pride and Glory	Carlos Bragon	
2009	Hotel for Dogs	Officer Mike	
2011	Thor	Agent Jasper Sitwell	
2011	Warrior	Colt Boyd	
2012	The Avengers	Agent Jasper Sitwell	
2014	Imperial Dreams	Det. Hernandez	
2014	Captain America: The Winter Soldier	Agent Jasper Sitwell	
2015	Sicario	Silvio	
2016	Get a Job	Businessman (Wilheimer Client)	
2019	Avengers: Endgame	Agent Jasper Sitwell	
2020	Stargirl	Mr. Robineau	
2022	Rise	Oklahoma City Thunder Rep	

=== Television ===
Year	Title	Role	Notes
1997	Law & Order	Various	3 episodes
2004	Law & Order: Criminal Intent	Nunez	1 episode
2006	Law & Order: Trial by Jury	Officer Miguel Montez	1 episode
2006	Conviction	Bernard Acosia	1 episode
2006	The Nine	Carlos Vega	1 episode
2006	Shark	Freddie Hopper	1 episode
2007	Numbers	Rico	1 episode
2007	K-Ville	Billy "K-9" Faust	1 episode
2009	24	Donnie Fox	2 episodes
2009	Southland	Antonio	1 episode
2010	Terriers	Ray	2 episodes
2011	The Closer	Raymond Aguirre	1 episode
2011–2012	Ringer	Detective Towers	Recurring role, 5 episodes
2013	The Americans	Chris Amador	Main role, 9 episodes
2013–2014	Agents of S.H.I.E.L.D.	Agent Jasper Sitwell	3 episodes
2014–2018	The Last Ship	Chief Hospital Corpsman "Doc" Rios	Recurring role, 30 episodes
2014	The Walking Dead	Bob Lamson	2 episodes
2014–2017	Hand of God	Toby Clay	Recurring role, 15 episodes
2016	Hawaii Five-0	Agent Navarro	1 episode
2018	Electric Dreams	Lewis	1 episode
2018–2019	Mr. Mercedes	Antonio Montez	Main role, 19 episodes
2019	This Is Us	Castillo	1 episode
2020	Paradise Lost	Wallace Cox	1 episode
2021	NCIS: New Orleans	Master-at-Arms Ted Yancy	2 episodes
2021	SEAL Team	Carl Dryden	3 episodes
2024	Griselda	Papo Mejia	Miniseries, 3 episodes

=== Short film ===
Year	Title	Role	Notes
2011	The Consultant	Agent Jasper Sitwell	Marvel One-Shots
2012	Item 47	Agent Jasper Sitwell	Marvel One-Shots
