= Item 47 =

2012 Marvel Studios short film

- Home media release poster
- Directed by: Louis D'Esposito
- Screenplay by: Eric Pearson
- Based on: S.H.I.E.L.D. by: Stan Lee; Jack Kirby
- Produced by: Kevin Feige
- Starring: Lizzy Caplan; Jesse Bradford; Maximiliano Hernández; Titus Welliver
- Cinematography: Gabriel Beristain
- Edited by: Hughes Winborne; John Breinholt
- Music by: Christopher Lennertz
- Production company: Marvel Studios
- Distributed by: Walt Disney Studios; Home Entertainment
- Release date: September 25, 2012
- Running time: 12 minutes
- Country: United States
- Language: English

Item 47 is a 2012 American short film featuring the Marvel Comics organization S.H.I.E.L.D. (Strategic Homeland Intervention Enforcement and Logistics Division), produced by Marvel Studios and distributed direct-to-video by Walt Disney Studios Home Entertainment on the home media release of Marvel's The Avengers. It is a follow-up and spin-off of The Avengers, and is the third Marvel One-Shot short film set in the Marvel Cinematic Universe (MCU), sharing continuity with the films of the franchise. The film is directed by Louis D'Esposito, with a screenplay by Eric Pearson, and stars Lizzy Caplan, Jesse Bradford, Maximiliano Hernández, and Titus Welliver, with Hernández reprising his role from the film series. In Item 47, two civilians come across a Chitauri gun and use it to commit crimes.

The short helped lead to ABC ordering a television series spin-off, Agents of S.H.I.E.L.D., which began airing in September 2013.

== Plot ==
Bennie and Claire, a down-on-their-luck couple, find a discarded Chitauri gun ("Item 47") left over from the attack on New York City in The Avengers. The couple use it to rob a few banks, drawing the attention of S.H.I.E.L.D., which assigns agents Jasper Sitwell and Felix Blake to retrieve the weapon and "neutralize" the couple. Agent Sitwell tracks the couple down to a motel room that gets wrecked in the subsequent confrontation, and the stolen money gets destroyed. Instead of killing the couple, Sitwell invites them to join S.H.I.E.L.D., with Bennie assigned to the R&D 'think-tank' to reverse engineer the Chitauri technology, and Claire becoming Blake's assistant.

== Cast ==
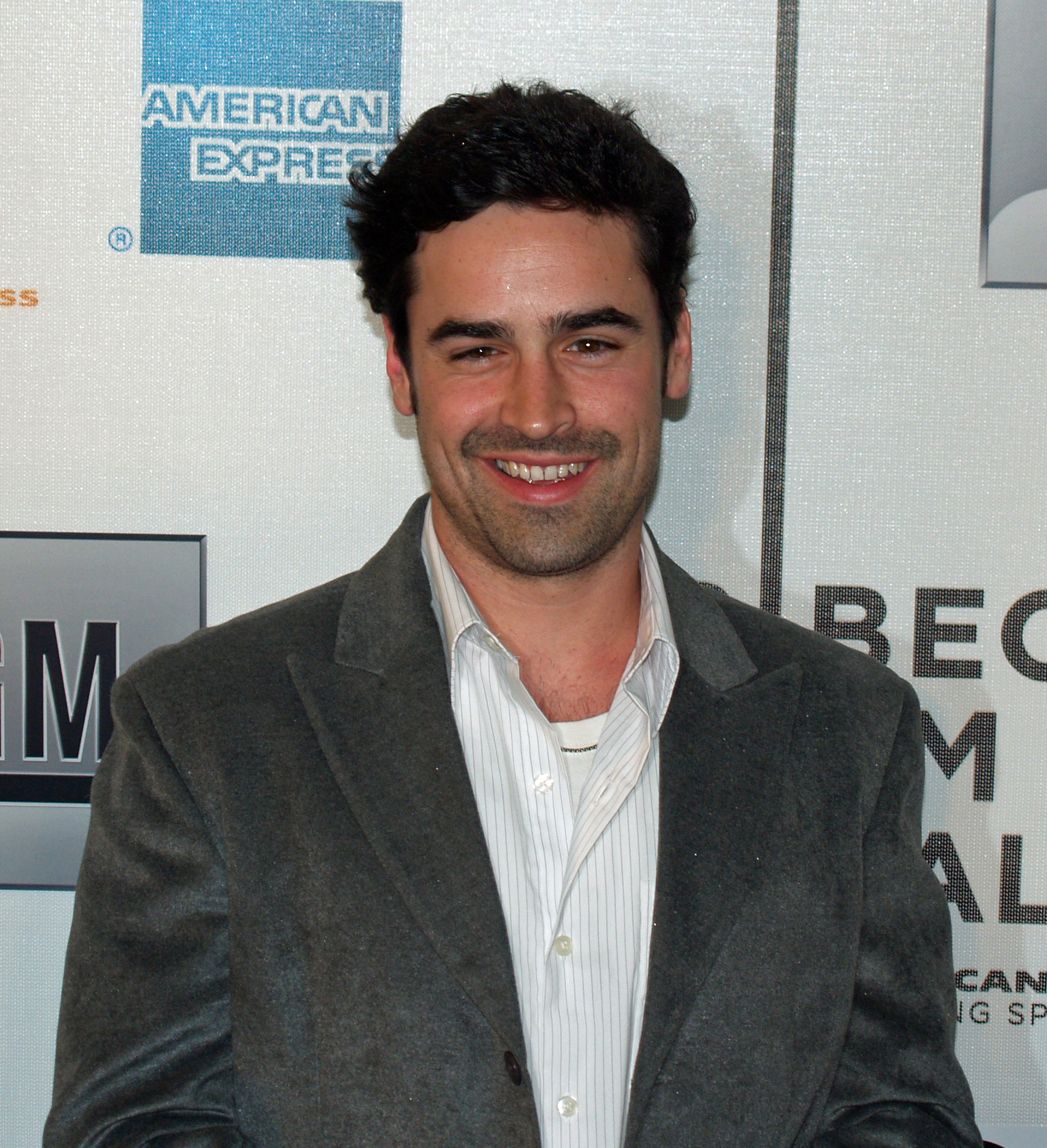
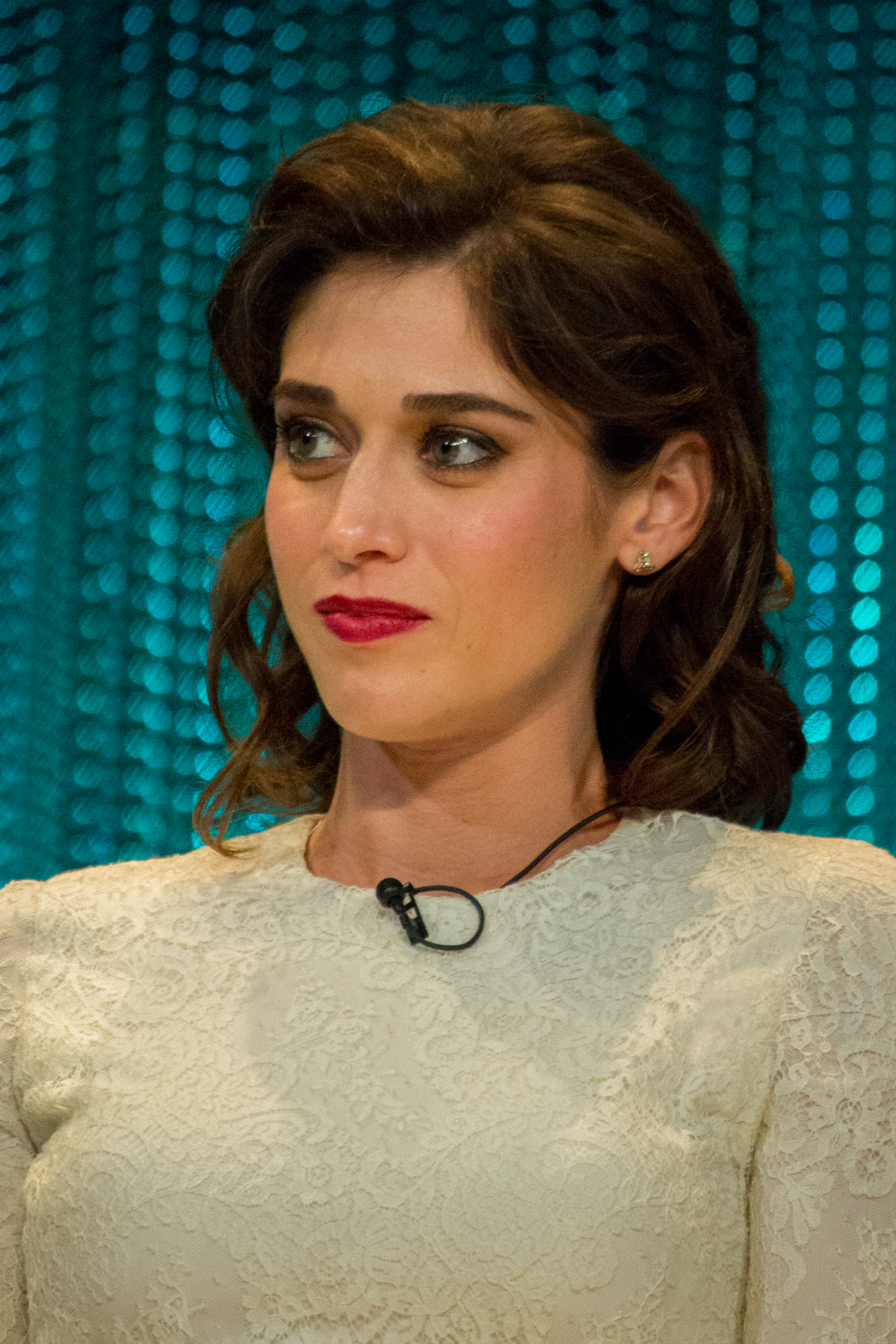
Jesse Bradford (left) and Lizzy Caplan (right), newcomers to the MCU, starred in the film.
- Lizzy Caplan as Claire Wise
- Jesse Bradford as Bennie Pollack
- Maximiliano Hernández as Jasper Sitwell
- Titus Welliver as Felix Blake

== Production ==
Item 47 was directed by Marvel Studios co-president Louis D'Esposito, written by Eric Pearson, and composed by Christopher Lennertz. The short film, which was filmed over four days, has a runtime of 12 minutes, longer than the previous films, which were no longer than 4 minutes. Pearson and D'Esposito had the idea for the short after watching the Marvel Cinematic Universe (MCU) film The Avengers (2012) and thinking, "New York is a mess. There must be weapons everywhere". An early idea Pearson and executive producer Brad Winderbaum had for the third Marvel One-Shots installment involved the funeral of Phil Coulson after his death in The Avengers, but they opted in the end to not "rely" on Coulson yet again after having the two previous One-Shots focused on him.

== Release ==
Item 47 was released on The Avengers Blu-ray on September 25, 2012. It will be included on the bonus-disc of the "Marvel Cinematic Universe: Phase Two Collection" box set, which includes all of the Phase Two films in the Marvel Cinematic Universe as well as the other Marvel One-Shots. The collection features audio commentary from D'Esposito, Hernandez, Welliver, and Bradford, and was released on December 8, 2015. The short became available on Disney+ on January 21, 2022 along with the other One-Shots and the Team Thor films.

== Reception ==
Andre Dellamorte of Collider called Item 47 "silly". William Bibbiani of CraveOnline said, "The short is largely a success: Hernandez, Bradford and Caplan are all in fine form although, Welliver seems saddled with a little awkward dialogue, particularly in regards to Coulson, which doesn't entirely sell." Spencer Terry of Superhero Hype! said, "[Item 47] is easily the best one they've done, and I think that can be attributed to its length seeing as it's three times longer than the other One-Shots. With a longer run time, the short film doesn't have to rush to show us everything that it wants to – we get a clear understanding of both the S.H.I.E.L.D. perspective of the events and the robbers' point of view."

== Television series ==
Disney CEO Bob Iger greenlit a television series based on S.H.I.E.L.D. at ABC after watching Item 47. Marvel's Agents of S.H.I.E.L.D. was officially picked up in May 2013. Welliver, having been introduced in the One-Shot, reprises his role in the series as a guest star.
