= Marvel One-Shots =

2011–2014 Marvel Studios short films

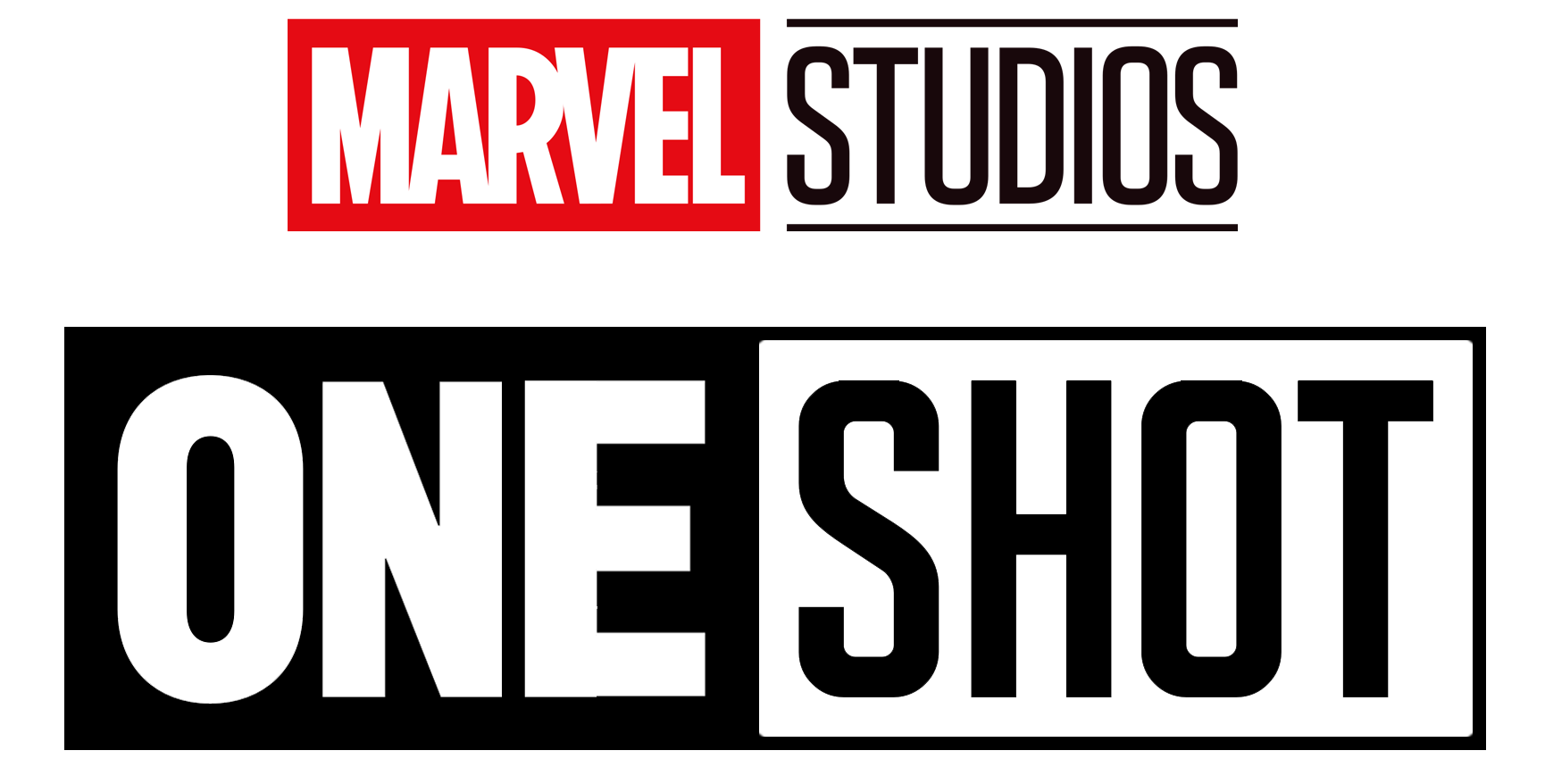
- One-Shot logo introduced on Disney+
- Directed by: See below
- Screenplay by: See below
- Based on: Characters published by Marvel Comics
- Produced by: Kevin Feige
- Starring: See below
- Production company: Marvel Studios
- Distributed by: Paramount Home Media Distribution (2011); Walt Disney Studios Home Entertainment (2012–14)
- Release date: 2011–14
- Running time: 4–15 minutes
- Country: United States
- Language: English

Marvel One-Shots are a series of direct-to-video short films produced by Marvel Studios, set within or inspired by the Marvel Cinematic Universe (MCU). Initially released from 2011 to 2014, they were included as special features on the MCU films' Blu-ray and digital distribution releases. The films, which range from 3 to 15 minutes, are designed to be self-contained stories that provide more backstory for characters or events introduced in the films. Two of the shorts inspired the development of MCU television series.

The Consultant (2011) and A Funny Thing Happened on the Way to Thor's Hammer (2011) star Clark Gregg as Agent Phil Coulson and offer up brief, self-contained stories about a day in the life of a S.H.I.E.L.D. agent. Marvel Studios then made several longer One-Shots: Item 47 (2012), starring Lizzy Caplan and Jesse Bradford as a down-on-their-luck couple who find a discarded Chitauri gun after the events of The Avengers (2012); Agent Carter (2013), starring Hayley Atwell as Peggy Carter after the events of Captain America: The First Avenger (2011); and All Hail the King (2014), starring Ben Kingsley as Trevor Slattery after the events of Iron Man 3 (2013).

The first two shorts received generally negative reviews, but the rest were more positively received and highlighted for their contributions to expanding the MCU. All the One-Shots were made available on Disney+ by January 2022, when the Team Thor mockumentary shorts (released from 2016 to 2018) were reclassified as One-Shots.

== Development ==
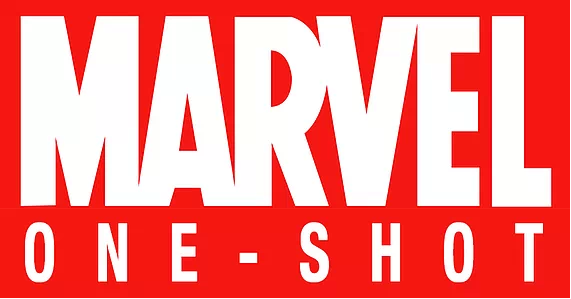
Original logo featured on the release posters of Agent Carter and All Hail the King

In August 2011, Marvel Studios announced that a couple of short films, designed to be self-contained stories, would be released direct-to-video. Co-producer Brad Winderbaum said they were a "fun way to experiment with new characters and ideas" and expand the Marvel Cinematic Universe (MCU) beyond the plots of the feature films. The first two shorts were made in conjunction with The Ebeling Group. Winderbaum said the name of the shorts program was derived from the label used by Marvel Comics for their one-shot comics.

Marvel Studios co-president Louis D'Esposito later said Marvel was considering introducing established characters who may not yet be ready to carry their own feature films in future One-Shots, stating, "There's always a potential to introduce a character. We have 8,000 of them, and they can't all be at the same level. So maybe there are some that are not so popular, and we introduce them [with a short]—and they take off. I could see that happening." When asked whether a Marvel superhero would ever appear in a One-Shot, D'Esposito replied that "We would love to, but it's difficult because there's a cost to that. If Iron Man is flying around doing something, that [is] very costly. And first of all, what's the story? Is it important that that superhero is in the story?"

During the Agent Carter panel at the 2013 San Diego Comic-Con, D'Esposito said Marvel was considering debuting short films in theaters before feature films. In May 2014, it was revealed that Captain America: The Winter Soldier's (2014) home media release would be the first to not include a One-Shot since the program started, and in October 2014, it was revealed that Guardians of the Galaxy's (2014) home media release also would not include a short. Guardians of the Galaxy director James Gunn said a One-Shot was not included with the film due to lack of space on the disc. Marvel Studios head Kevin Feige stated in May 2015 that there were no active plans to make more Marvel One-Shots, but the studio was not opposed to continuing the series.

All of the One-Shots were made available on Disney+ by January 2022, at which point the Team Thor mockumentary shorts (which were released from 2016 to 2018) were reclassified as One-Shots. Feige had previously described the Team Thor shorts as a "doable" version of the One-Shot program, and felt there was potential for future One-Shots to similarly be released as extra content prior to a film's premiere.

== Films ==
Short films in the Marvel Cinematic Universe
Film	U.S. release date	Director	Screenwriter	Producer	Home media release
The Consultant	September 13, 2011	Leythum	Eric Pearson	Kevin Feige	Thor
A Funny Thing Happened on the Way to Thor's Hammer	October 25, 2011	Leythum	Eric Pearson	Kevin Feige	Captain America: The First Avenger
Item 47	September 25, 2012	Louis D'Esposito	Eric Pearson	Kevin Feige	Marvel's The Avengers
Agent Carter	September 3, 2013 (digital); September 24, 2013 (physical)	Louis D'Esposito	Eric Pearson	Kevin Feige	Iron Man 3
All Hail the King	February 4, 2014 (digital); February 25, 2014 (physical)	Drew Pearce	Drew Pearce	Kevin Feige	Thor: The Dark World

=== The Consultant (2011) ===
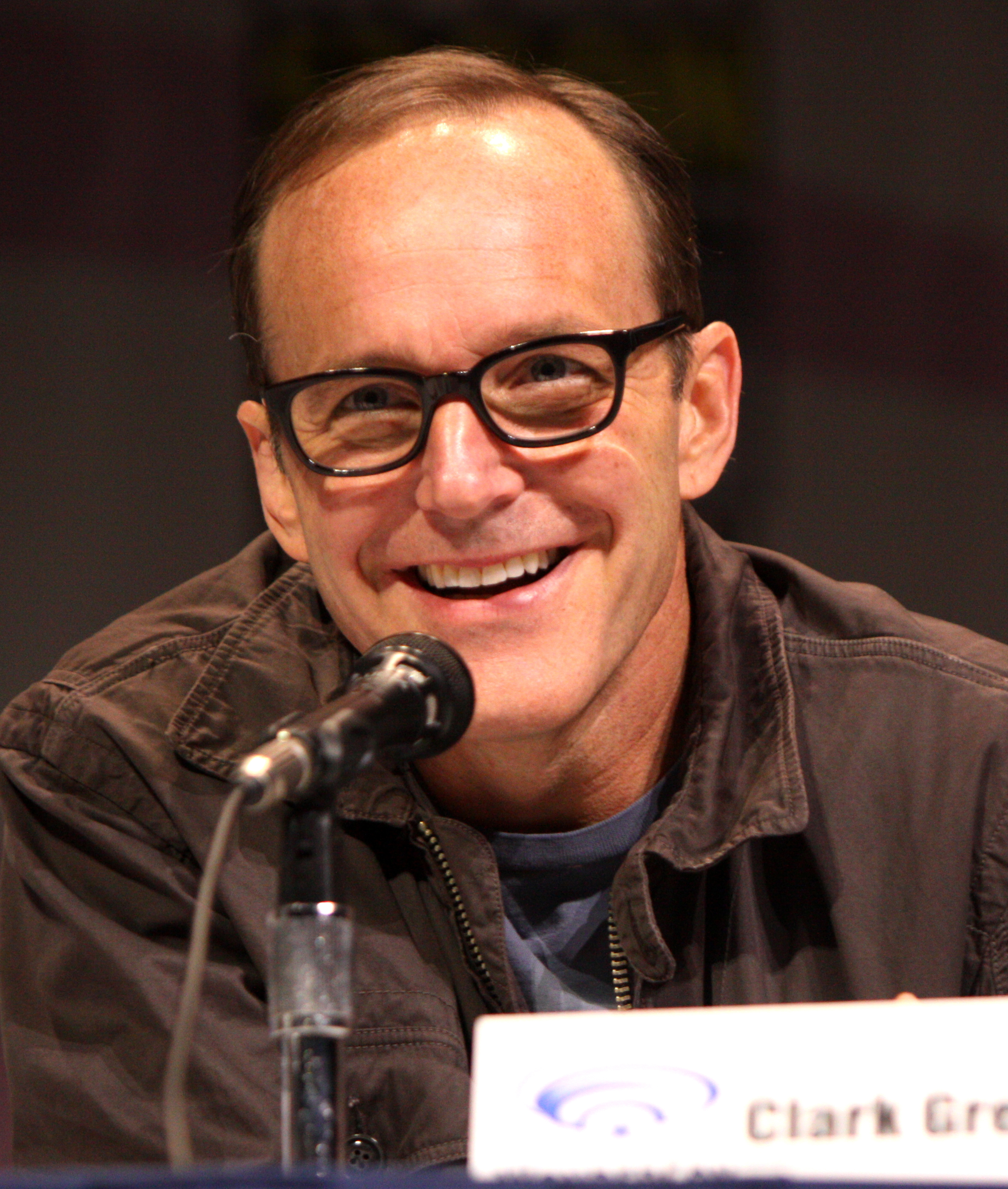
Clark Gregg reprised his role from the MCU films as Agent Phil Coulson in the first two Marvel One-Shots.

Set after the events of Iron Man 2 and The Incredible Hulk, Phil Coulson informs Jasper Sitwell that the World Security Council wishes for Emil Blonsky to be released from prison to join the Avengers Initiative. They see him as a war hero and blame the devastation in Harlem on Bruce Banner. The Council orders them to ask General Thaddeus Ross to release Blonsky into S.H.I.E.L.D. custody. As Nick Fury does not want to release Blonsky, the two agents decide to send a patsy to sabotage the meeting. Coulson reluctantly sends "The Consultant", Tony Stark, and (as partially depicted in the post-credits scene of The Incredible Hulk) Stark approaches the disgraced Ross while he is drinking in a bar. Stark annoys Ross so much that he tries to have Stark removed from the bar, until Stark buys the bar and has it scheduled for demolition. The next day, Coulson informs Sitwell that their plan worked and Blonsky will remain in prison.

At the 2011 San Diego Comic-Con, Marvel announced that The Consultant would appear exclusively on the Thor Blu-ray release on September 13, 2011. It was directed by Leythum and written by Eric Pearson, with music by Paul Oakenfold. The short was filmed over 2–3 days. Clark Gregg and Maximiliano Hernández return to portray Agent Phil Coulson and Agent Jasper Sitwell, respectively, from the films. They are joined via archive footage by Robert Downey Jr. as Tony Stark / The Consultant, William Hurt as General Thaddeus Ross, and Tim Roth as Emil Blonsky in his Abomination form. Co-producer Brad Winderbaum said the producers "wanted to paint a picture of S.H.I.E.L.D. pulling the strings and being responsible for some of the events seen in the films. What better character to represent this idea than Agent Coulson, the first S.H.I.E.L.D. agent we were introduced to in the first Iron Man film?" Gregg said he was told about the short film program in the same phone call that warned him Coulson would die in The Avengers. The actor noticed that the One-Shots could then provide more information on Coulson, to "build the audience's relationship [with] him" and make his death in the film more impactful. The Consultant was written after A Funny Thing Happened on the Way to Thor's Hammer, due to the latter taking up 80% of the budget Marvel reserved for the two shorts, leaving a remaining budget "for two guys talking". To help with this, Pearson included Sitwell in the short, who had a minor role in Thor, and had him and Coulson "brainstorming a way to deal with this red tape bureaucratic politics of the Avengers Initiative".

=== A Funny Thing Happened on the Way to Thor's Hammer (2011) ===
Set before the events of Thor, Phil Coulson stops at a gas station on his way to Albuquerque, New Mexico. While Coulson shops for snacks in the back of the station, two robbers enter and demand the money from the register. When the robbers ask whose car is outside, Coulson reveals himself, surrenders his keys, and offers to surrender his pistol as well. As he turns over the gun, Coulson distracts the robbers and subdues both men in seconds. He then nonchalantly pays for his snacks while advising the clerk not to mention his involvement to the police.

A Funny Thing Happened on the Way to Thor's Hammer was included on the Captain America: The First Avenger Blu-ray release on October 25, 2011. It was directed by Leythum and written by Eric Pearson, with music by Paul Oakenfold. It was filmed over 2–3 days. The short stars Clark Gregg reprising his role as Agent Phil Coulson, and served to showcase Coulson as "more than just an annoying bureaucrat" of S.H.I.E.L.D.

=== Item 47 (2012) ===
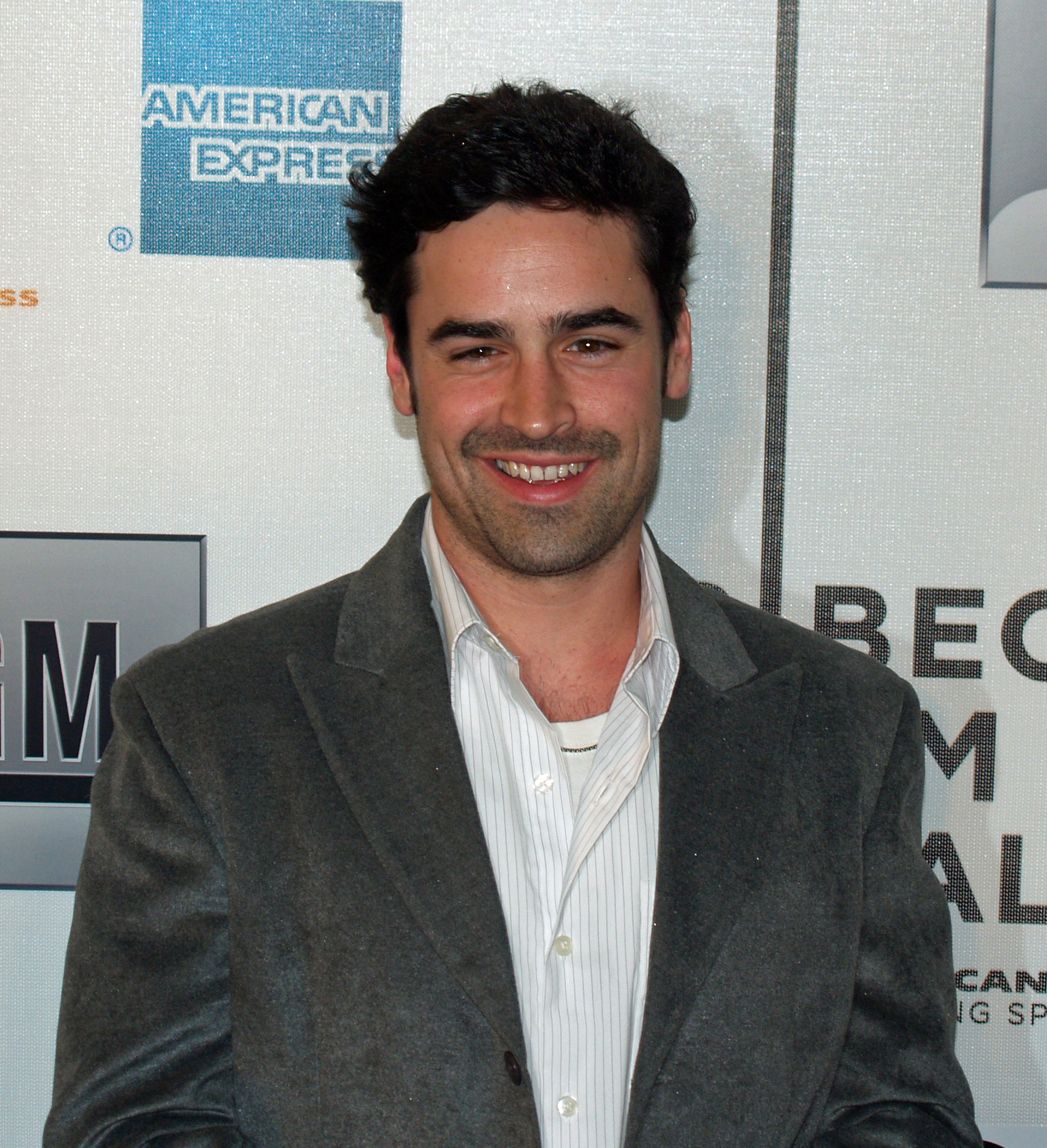
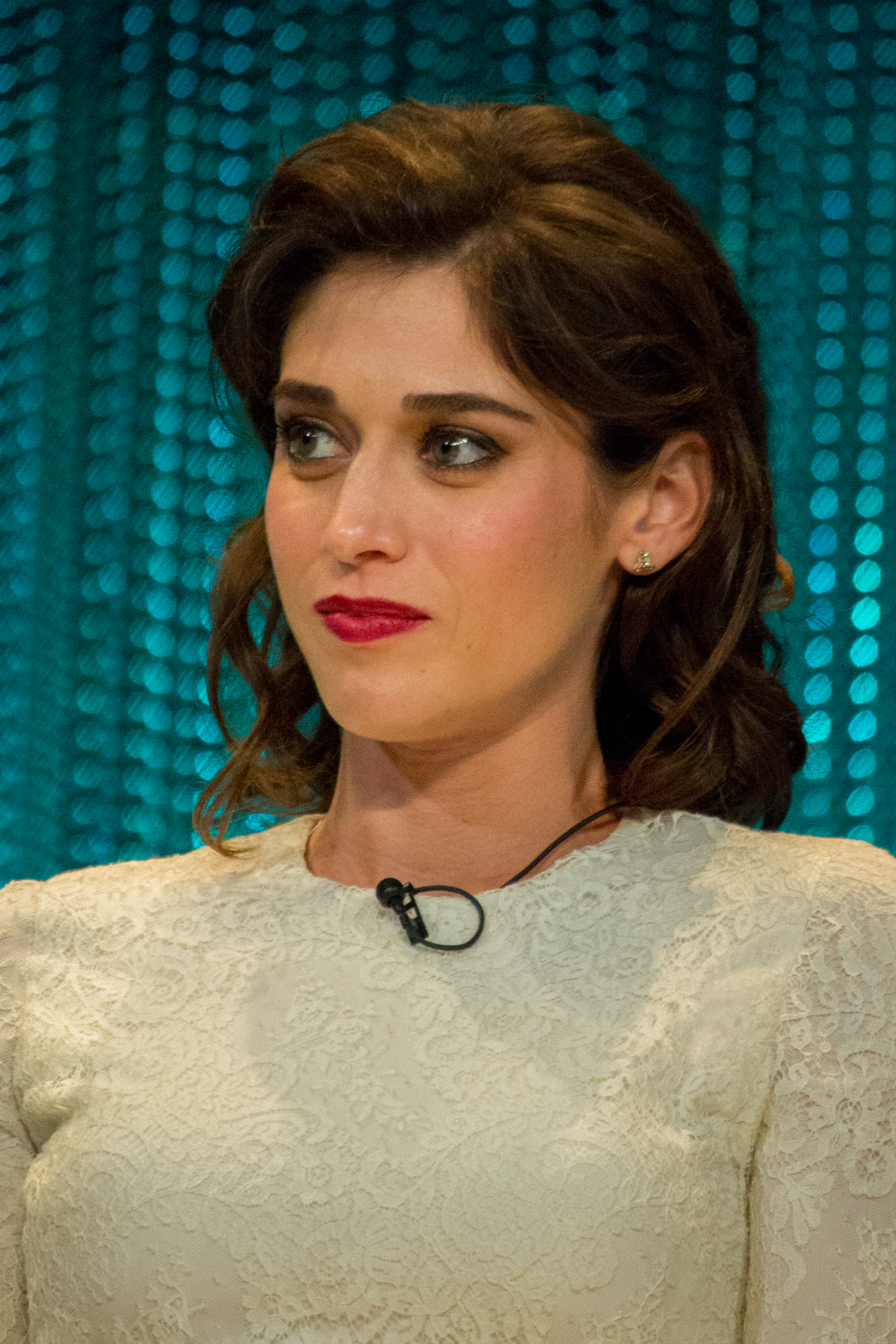
Newcomers to the MCU, Jesse Bradford (left) and Lizzy Caplan (right) starred in Item 47.

Bennie and Claire, a down-on-their-luck couple, find a discarded Chitauri gun ("Item 47") left over from the attack on New York City in The Avengers. The couple use it to rob a few banks, drawing the attention of S.H.I.E.L.D., which assigns agents Sitwell and Blake to retrieve the weapon and "neutralize" the couple. Agent Sitwell tracks the couple down to a motel room that gets wrecked in the subsequent confrontation, and the stolen money gets destroyed. Instead of killing the couple, Sitwell invites them to join S.H.I.E.L.D., with Bennie assigned to the R&D 'think-tank' to reverse engineer the Chitauri technology, and Claire becoming Blake's assistant.

Item 47 was released on The Avengers Blu-ray on September 25, 2012. The film stars Jesse Bradford and Lizzy Caplan as Bennie and Claire, respectively. The film also sees the return of Agent Sitwell, played by Maximiliano Hernández, and introduced Agent Blake, portrayed by Titus Welliver. It was directed by Marvel Studios co-president Louis D'Esposito, written by Eric Pearson, and features music by Christopher Lennertz. The short film, which was filmed over four days, has a runtime of 12 minutes, longer than the previous films, which were no longer than 4 minutes. Pearson and D'Esposito had the idea for the short after watching The Avengers and thinking, "New York is a mess. There must be weapons everywhere". Item 47 partially inspired the MCU television series Agents of S.H.I.E.L.D.

=== Agent Carter (2013) ===
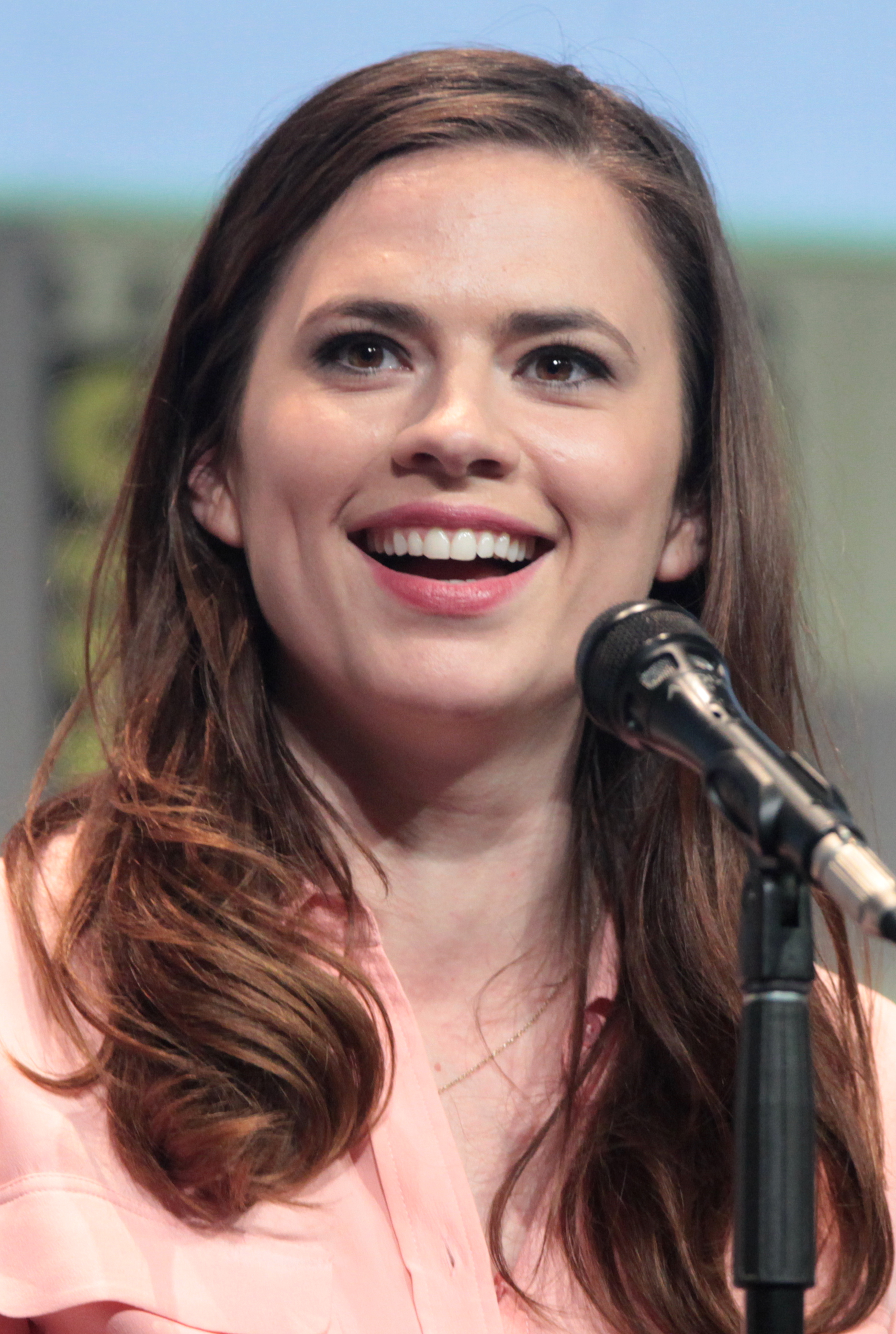
Hayley Atwell reprised her role from Captain America: The First Avenger, continuing the story of Peggy Carter.

One year after the events of Captain America: The First Avenger, Strategic Scientific Reserve Agent Peggy Carter is stuck compiling data instead of working field cases. One night, while alone in the office, the case line informs Carter of the location of the mysterious Zodiac. She is able to retrieve the Zodiac serum single-handedly. The next day, Agent John Flynn reprimands Carter for not going through the proper procedures to complete the mission. Carter explains that the mission was time-sensitive, but Flynn is unmoved, dismissing the indignant Carter as an "old flame" of Captain America's who was given her current job out of pity for her bereavement. The case line rings again, this time with Howard Stark on the other end, who tells Flynn to inform Carter that she will co-head the newly created S.H.I.E.L.D. In a mid-credit scene, Dum Dum Dugan is seen poolside with Stark, marveling at two women wearing the newly created bikinis.

Agent Carter, released on the Iron Man 3 Blu-ray release on September 24, 2013, as well as part of the digital download release on September 3, 2013, was seen as a bridge between that film and the then-upcoming Captain America: The Winter Soldier. Marvel had considered adding it to previous home media releases as well. Hayley Atwell reprises her role as Peggy Carter, along with Dominic Cooper and Neal McDonough reprising their respective roles as Howard Stark and Timothy "Dum Dum" Dugan. Chris Evans appears as Steve Rogers / Captain America via archive footage. The short introduces Bradley Whitford as Agent John Flynn and Iron Man 3 director Shane Black as the Disembodied Voice. It was directed by Louis D'Esposito and written by Eric Pearson. The short was filmed over five days, and reused visual effects shots of 1940s New York from Captain America: The First Avenger to save money. Christopher Lennertz returned from Item 47 to compose music for the short, and went on to compose the score for the MCU television series Agent Carter, which was partially inspired by the short.

=== All Hail the King (2014) ===
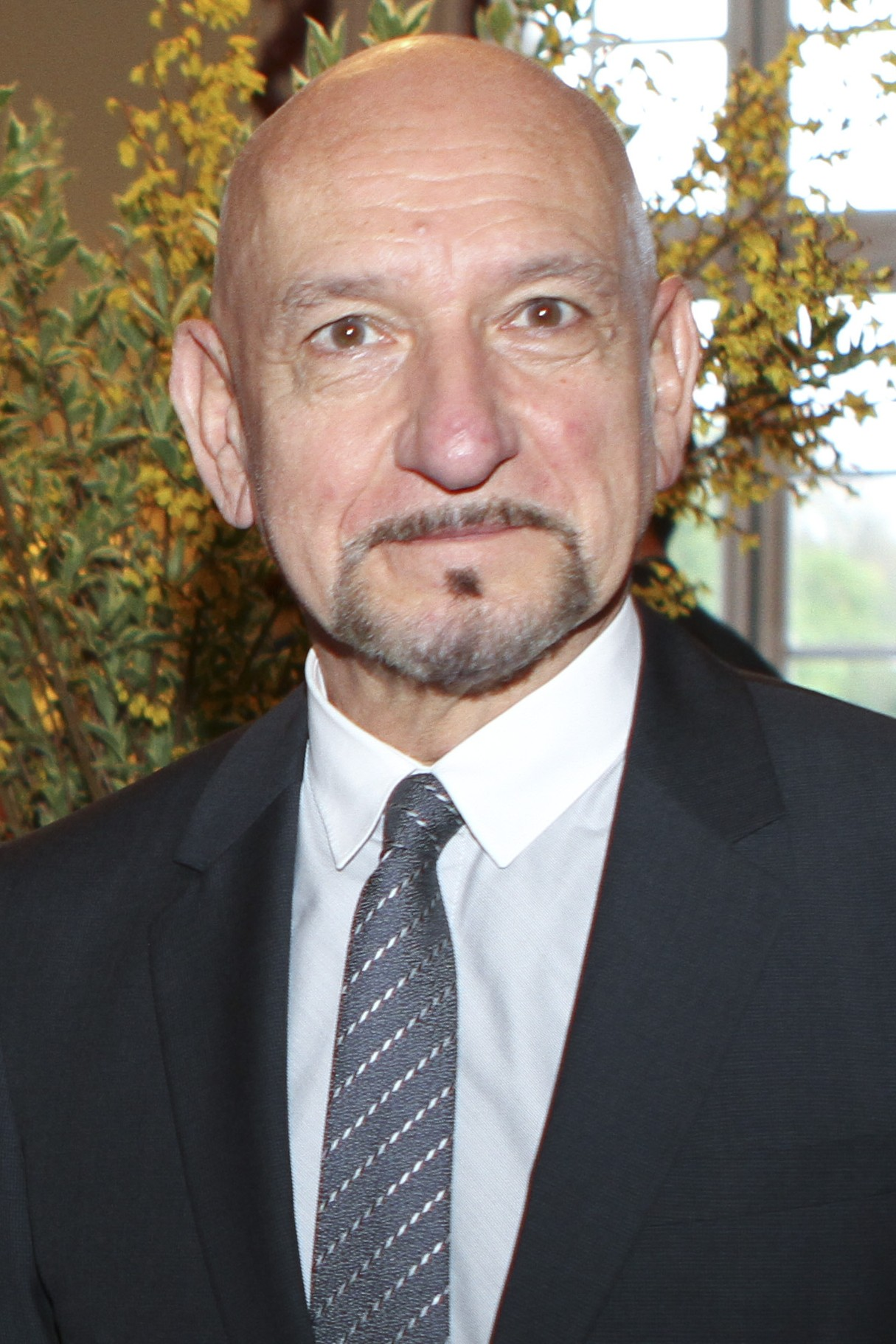
After Ben Kingsley was attached to All Hail the King, additional crew members signed on.

Trevor Slattery was arrested at the end of Iron Man 3 and is now held in Seagate Prison where he is living luxuriously, with his own personal "butler", Herman, as well as a fan club of other inmates who protect him. Looking on at the attention Slattery receives is Justin Hammer, who wonders what makes him so special. Slattery has been talking with documentary filmmaker Jackson Norriss to chronicle the events of the Mandarin situation seen in Iron Man 3. Trying to learn more about him personally, Norriss recounts Slattery's past from his first casting as a child to his starring in a failed CBS pilot. Norriss eventually informs Slattery that his portrayal has angered some people, including the actual Ten Rings terrorist group, which Slattery did not know existed. Norriss tells him the history of the Mandarin and the terrorist group, before revealing that he is a member of the group. The real reason for the interview is to break Slattery out of prison so he can meet the actual Mandarin. Hearing this, Slattery still has no idea of the full ramifications of his posing as the Mandarin.

In October 2013, Ben Kingsley said he was working on a secret project with Marvel involving "many members of the crew that were involved in Iron Man 3", later revealed to be the Marvel One-Shot All Hail the King, which was released on the digital download release of Thor: The Dark World on February 4, 2014, and on February 25, 2014 for the Blu-ray release. The film stars Ben Kingsley as Trevor Slattery, reprising his role from Iron Man 3; Scoot McNairy as Jackson Norriss, a member of the Ten Rings terrorist organization posing as a documentary filmmaker; Lester Speight as Herman; and Sam Rockwell as Justin Hammer, reprising his role from Iron Man 2. The short was written and directed by Drew Pearce, the co-screenwriter of Iron Man 3, and was filmed in Los Angeles. Pearce and producer Stephen Broussard had the idea for the short during the production of Iron Man 3, to provide a "fresh take" on the Mandarin character. Music for the short was composed by Iron Man 3's Brian Tyler, with the fake CBS pilot, Caged Heat, receiving a new musical theme composed by 1980s TV-music icon Mike Post.

=== Team Thor series (2016–18) ===
Short film series in the Marvel Cinematic Universe
Film	U.S. release date		Director & Screenwriter	Producer	Home media release
Film	Digital	Physical	Director & Screenwriter	Producer	Home media release
Team Thor	August 28, 2016	September 13, 2016	Taika Waititi	Kevin Feige	Captain America: Civil War
Team Thor: Part 2	February 14, 2017	February 28, 2017	Taika Waititi	Kevin Feige	Doctor Strange
Team Darryl	February 20, 2018	March 6, 2018	Taika Waititi	Kevin Feige	Thor: Ragnarok

Team Thor is a series of direct-to-video mockumentary short films that were released from 2016 to 2018, consisting of Team Thor, Team Thor: Part 2, and Team Darryl, all written and directed by Taika Waititi. The three short films are included as special features in the MCU films' Blu-ray and digital distribution releases. The first two films follow Thor as he moves in with a new roommate, Darryl Jacobson, during the events of Captain America: Civil War, while Team Darryl sees Darryl move to Los Angeles and move in with the Grandmaster. The shorts were designed to introduce MCU fans to the irreverent tone of Waititi's Thor: Ragnarok.

== Cast and characters ==
List indicators
This section includes characters who have appeared in the One-Shots.
- A dark grey cell indicates the character was not in the film.
- An ^{A} indicates an appearance through archival footage.
- A ^{DS} indicates the character appears in a digital series.
- An ^{MS} indicates the character appears in a Marvel Studios television series.
- An ^{MT} indicates the character appears in a Marvel Television series.
- A ^{V} indicates a voice-only role.

Character	The Consultant (2011)	A Funny Thing Happened on the Way to Thor's Hammer (2011)	Item 47 (2012)	Agent Carter (2013)	All Hail the King (2014)	Team Thor series (2016–18)
=== Introduced in films ===
Bruce Banner						Mark Ruffalo
Emil Blonsky Abomination	Tim Roth^{A}^{V}					
Peggy Carter^{MT}				Hayley Atwell		
Phil Coulson^{DS} ^{MT}	Clark Gregg	Clark Gregg				
Timothy "Dum Dum" Dugan^{MT}				Neal McDonough		
Grandmaster						Jeff Goldblum
Justin Hammer					Sam Rockwell	
Steve Rogers Captain America				Chris Evans^{A}		
Thaddeus Ross	William Hurt^{A}					
Jasper Sitwell^{MT}	Maximiliano Hernández		Maximiliano Hernández			
Trevor Slattery					Ben Kingsley	
Howard Stark^{MT}				Dominic Cooper		
Tony Stark	Robert Downey Jr.^{A}					
Thor						Chris Hemsworth
=== Introduced in One-Shots ===
Felix Blake^{MT}			Titus Welliver			
John Flynn^{MS}				Bradley Whitford		
Herman					Lester Speight	
Jackson Norriss					Scoot McNairy	
Bennie Pollack			Jesse Bradford			
Disembodied Voice				Shane Black^{V}		
Claire Wise			Lizzy Caplan			
=== Introduced in the Team Thor series ===
Darryl Jacobson^{F}						Daley Pearson

== Collection ==
All of the Marvel One-Shots were included on the bonus-disc of the "Marvel Cinematic Universe: Phase Two Collection" box set, which includes all of the Phase Two films in the Marvel Cinematic Universe. The One-Shots feature audio commentary, with Gregg providing it for The Consultant and A Funny Thing Happened on the Way to Thor's Hammer; D'Esposito, Hernandez, Welliver, and Bradford on Item 47; D'Esposito and Atwell for Agent Carter; and Pearce and Kingsley with All Hail the King. The collection was released on December 8, 2015. All One-Shots were made available on Disney+ by January 2022, along with the Team Thor films.

== Reception ==
Cindy White of IGN was intrigued by The Consultant and felt the "snappy dialogue seems to fit right in with what we expect from a Joss Whedon-ized Avengers movie." Scott Chitwood of ComingSoon.net was disappointed by the short due to a third of it simply re-using the end scene of The Incredible Hulk and the rest of the short just featuring Coulson "sitting and having a chat". R.L. Shaffer at IGN said A Funny Thing Happened on the Way to Thor's Hammer was fun, while Zachary Scheer wrote for CinemaBlend that the short was "as hackneyed as that title. It's about four minutes of Coulson being a badass, if the definition of 'badass' is performing needless slow-motion action stunts and then pausing to consider something normal people would consider—like which donuts to buy."

Collider's Andre Dellamorte said Item 47 was silly, while William Bibbiani of CraveOnline found it to be a success, highlighting the performances of Hernandez, Bradford, and Caplan. He did think Welliver was "saddled with a little awkward dialogue, particularly in regards to Coulson, which doesn't entirely sell". Spencer Terry at Superhero Hype! said the short was "easily the best" of the One-Shots so far, and attributed that to its longer runtime. He felt that this meant Item 47 did not need to rush and was able to give a "clear understanding of both the S.H.I.E.L.D. perspective of the events and the robbers' point of view".

Andy Hunsaker of CraveOnline said Agent Carter was a "fun treat" that could lead to some female-focused Marvel films, and also felt it gave Peggy Carter "the send-off she deserves." At IGN, Scott Collura said Carter was the "big-screen female superhero we've all been waiting for. She kicks so much ass in this short story with such aplomb, using not just brawn but also brains, and it's all very clever and fun". Rosie Fletcher of Total Film praised Atwell as a "perfect femme fatale-come-special agent", and also praised the visuals of the short as well as its action. By the release of Agent Carter, knowing that Item 47 had led to the creation of Agents of S.H.I.E.L.D. and there were discussions of the Agent Carter short doing the same for a series centered on Peggy Carter, Graeme McMillan of The Hollywood Reporter felt the shorts were no longer "fun little throwaways filled with Easter Eggs" but instead were an important program for Marvel that gave a "sneak peek at the shape of things to come".

IGN's Cliff Wheatley gave All Hail the King a 9.4 out of 10, and described it as a "return to the loveable personality of the hapless Trevor and a step forward for the larger Marvel Cinematic Universe. It has its twists that should satisfy both lovers and haters of Trevor Slattery. But it's the approach that Pearce takes with the material, from the kung-fu movie style credit sequences to the light-hearted tone that takes a sudden and jarring turn. Kingsley once again shines in the role of Slattery, aloof and ignorant, but more than happy to slide back into Mandarin mode if it will please his adoring fans. Pearce does go for some of the same jokes from Iron Man 3 in a sort of referential way, but it's nothing too damaging." Andrew Wheeler of ComicsAlliance criticized the way homosexuality was presented in the short, given it was Marvel Studios' first attempt to bring LGBT concepts into the MCU.

== Potential projects ==
In May 2013, DMG Entertainment said they were considering creating a short film, tentatively titled The Prologue, centered on Wang Xueqi's Dr. Wu from Iron Man 3, who only appeared in 10 seconds of the film outside of China; Xueqi appeared in three minutes of the Chinese release of the film. The Prologue would be composed of sequences shot during the production of Iron Man 3 and would explore Wu before the events of Iron Man. DMG added that they were unsure of how they would release the short, saying rumors claiming The Prologue could possibly release on television or a future MCU home media release were "speculation".

D'Esposito said in July 2013 that he had considered making stand-alone shorts for several characters, including Loki, a young Nick Fury, Black Panther, Ms. Marvel, and Black Widow. However, D'Esposito noted that a story about Loki would be complicated by how costly it is to portray Asgard, while for Fury and Black Panther they would have to cast new actors and design costumes. He added, "We tried. We were there in development, and we tried, but they were very difficult for all the reasons I gave. And we don't want to do something that's half baked because it's not good for us and it's not good for our fans." In February 2014, Pearce mentioned other shorts that he had written that never came to fruition, including ones based on Sin and Crossbones, Jessica Jones, and Damage Control.

Feige said in May 2015 that Marvel was not opposed to making more One-Shots, and there was a backlog of potential ideas. In September 2015, he added that with the MCU expanding to three feature films a year they would struggle to find the "time and place" to make more content than that, despite their continued discussions about potential future One-Shots. Spider-Man actor Tom Holland hinted in June 2017 that Marvel was planning on creating more One-Shots, and Pearson reiterated this in October, adding that he had a folder of One-Shot ideas that he had created. Taika Waititi said there were discussions about creating a One-Shot centered on the characters Korg and Miek from Ragnarok. In April 2018, D'Esposito said Disney hoped Marvel would continue with the One-Shot films, but admitted that the studio was busy focusing on their increased feature film output. In the book The Story of Marvel Studios: The Making of the Marvel Cinematic Universe, which was published in October 2021, D'Esposito said more One-Shots were in development. In June 2023, Nicholas Pillay of Comic Book Resources opined that Marvel should create new One-Shots to debut on Disney+, as it would provide additional value to the service's subscribers, while being able to expand the wider MCU as the original shorts did.

== See also ==
- Marvel's Special Presentations, television specials by Marvel Studios
