= Laws of Nature (Agents of S.H.I.E.L.D.) =

- Agents of S.H.I.E.L.D. episode
- The final scene, showing the whereabouts of Jemma Simmons to be on an alien world, was mentioned by many critics.
- Episode no.: Season 3 Episode 1
- Directed by: Vincent Misiano
- Written by: Jed Whedon; Maurissa Tancharoen
- Cinematography by: Feliks Parnell
- Editing by: Joshua Charson
- Original air date: September 29, 2015
- Running time: 43 minutes

Guest appearances
- William Sadler as Matthew Ellis; Constance Zimmer as Rosalind Price; Andrew Howard as Luther Banks; Matthew Willig as Lash; Juan Pablo Raba as Joey Gutierrez

Episode chronology
← Previous "S.O.S."	Next → "Purpose in the Machine"
- Agents of S.H.I.E.L.D. season 3

"Laws of Nature" is the first episode of the third season of the American television series Agents of S.H.I.E.L.D., Based on the Marvel Comics organization S.H.I.E.L.D., it follows Phil Coulson and his team of S.H.I.E.L.D. agents as they hunt for Inhumans, who are also being hunted by the new Advanced Threat Containment Unit (ACTU) and the monstrous Lash. It is set in the Marvel Cinematic Universe (MCU) and acknowledges the franchise's films. The episode was written by Jed Whedon and Maurissa Tancharoen, and directed by Vincent Misiano.

Clark Gregg reprises his role as Coulson from the film series, and is joined by series regulars Chloe Bennet, Iain De Caestecker, Elizabeth Henstridge, Nick Blood, Adrianne Palicki, Henry Simmons, and Luke Mitchell. A third season was ordered in May 2015, with new recurring characters portrayed by Constance Zimmer, Matthew Willig, Andrew Howard, and Juan Pablo Raba introduced, the last of these as the first openly gay character in the MCU. William Sadler also guest stars, reprising his role of President Matthew Ellis from Iron Man 3, as the episode references previous MCU films, and provides set-up for future MCU films.

"Laws of Nature" originally aired on ABC on September 29, 2015, and according to Nielsen Media Research, was watched by 7.86 million viewers within a week of its release. The episode received a positive critical response, with praise going to the newly established status quo, including the elevated role of the Inhumans, and the introduction of new characters. The timeliness of the revelation of Simmons' (Henstridge) whereabouts following the second season finale was also praised.

== Plot ==
Six months after the alien substance Terrigen was released into the ecosystem, (Note: As depicted in "S.O.S.".) Joey Gutierrez developed metal-melting abilities. Unable to control this power, Gutierrez is confronted in the streets by soldiers who are willing to use lethal force to detain him. Gutierrez is saved by S.H.I.E.L.D., and Inhuman agent Daisy Johnson attempts to explain to him that he is also an Inhuman, with a dormant gene within him that was activated by the Terrigen. Struggling to help Gutierrez accept what has happened to him, Johnson seeks the help of Lincoln Campbell, the Inhuman who helped her transition but has now renounced the ways of the Inhumans, wishing to live a normal life.

Agent Leo Fitz, searching for answers concerning a mysterious Kree monolith that has apparently consumed his partner Jemma Simmons, acquires an ancient Hebrew scroll describing it as "Death" (Hebrew: מוות). S.H.I.E.L.D. director Phil Coulson searches for the leader of the soldiers who have been taking new Inhumans, and discovers a woman who has worked for multiple government agencies around the world under different names. He and Agent Lance Hunter are able to confront her in what seems to be a weak point in her security, but is actually a trap. Giving her name as Rosalind Price, she confronts Coulson about his organization's killing of new Inhumans before her group can get to them, which he denies, and the two realize that there is a third party involved.

At the hospital where Campbell works, he, Johnson, and her partner Alphonso "Mack" Mackenzie are attacked by the monstrous Inhuman Lash, and Johnson and Campbell barely manage to hold him off. The subsequent arrival of Price's forces causes both Lash and Campbell to flee. Afterwards, President Matthew Ellis officially announces Price's organisation—the Advanced Threat Containment Unit (ATCU)—as a replacement for the now underground S.H.I.E.L.D., and they begin hunting their next target after Gutierrez: Campbell. A computer simulation informs Coulson that the Terrigen may cover the entire world within the next 18 months.

Fitz is unable to accept the fact that Simmons may be dead, despite Coulson urging him to move on, and an end tag reveals that Simmons is alive and on the run on a desolate planet.

== Production ==
=== Development ===
The series was renewed for a third season on May 7, 2015, and in September 2015, Marvel announced that the premiere episode of the season would be titled "Laws of Nature". The episode is written by executive producers Jed Whedon and Maurissa Tancharoen, with Vincent Misiano directing, and introduces a new title graphic for the series, replacing the one that appeared for the first two seasons.

=== Casting ===
In May 2015, all principal cast members from the first and second seasons Clark Gregg as Phil Coulson, Ming-Na Wen as Melinda May, Brett Dalton as Grant Ward, Chloe Bennet as Daisy Johnson (no longer going by her previous name of "Skye"), Iain De Caestecker as Leo Fitz, Elizabeth Henstridge as Jemma Simmons, Nick Blood as Lance Hunter, and Adrianne Palicki as Bobbi Morse were confirmed to return for the third. They are joined by Luke Mitchell and Henry Simmons, who recurred as Lincoln Campbell and Alphonso "Mack" Mackenzie, respectively, throughout the second season, before being promoted to the principal cast for the third. In July 2015, Andrew Howard and Constance Zimmer were cast as Luther Banks and Rosalind Price, and in August 2015, Matt Willig and Juan Pablo Raba were announced as new Inhumans Lash and Joey Gutierrez.

In September 2015, Marvel revealed that Zimmer, Willig, Raba, and Howard would all guest star in "Laws of Nature", along with Ido Mor as Yusef Hadad, Jude B. Lanston as soldier #1, Daniel Messier as heavy and Kate Hilliard as Tina. Mor, Lanston, Messier, and Hilliard did not receive guest star credit in the episode, while Wen and Dalton, though credited, do not ultimately appear. Additionally, William Sadler reprises his Iron Man 3 role of President Matthew Ellis in the episode.

=== Filming ===
Production on the season began in late July 2015. Filming for the alien planet occurred in a work quarry in Simi Valley and in Northridge, Los Angeles near the Mojave Desert.

=== Marvel Cinematic Universe tie-ins ===
The episode makes mention of several MCU films, including Marvel's The Avengers, Thor: The Dark World, Captain America: The Winter Soldier, Avengers: Age of Ultron and Ant-Man, while the appearance of Sadler as President Ellis and his announcement of an anti-superhuman task force are the beginning of the series tying in with Captain America: Civil War. As Whedon says, "When we came into the Marvel [Cinematic] Universe in the first films, there were very, very few people with powers. Now they are in a new world and the rules are going to have to change....a lot of those same themes [from the film] will be addressed on our show. How they tie in is a question mark for all involved, but we would definitely be dealing with some of those same themes." The presidential address was broadcast by the fictional news station WHiH, which has been seen throughout the universe. The reveal in "Laws of Nature" that the Terrigen has spread into the Earth's ecosystem was further set-up for the Inhumans film that Marvel Studios had plans for.

== Release ==
"Laws of Nature" was first shown at a premiere held for the season on September 23, 2015, at Pacific Theatres at The Grove in Los Angeles. The episode then aired in the United States on ABC on September 29, 2015. On June 16, 2016, the episode began streaming with the rest of the third season on Netflix.

== Reception ==
=== Ratings ===
In the United States the episode received a 1.7/5 percent share among adults between the ages of 18 and 49, meaning that it was seen by 1.7 percent of all households, and 5 percent of all of those watching television at the time of the broadcast. It was watched by 4.90 million viewers. Within a week of its release the episode had been watched by 7.86 million U.S. viewers, above the season average of 5.52 million.

=== Critical response ===
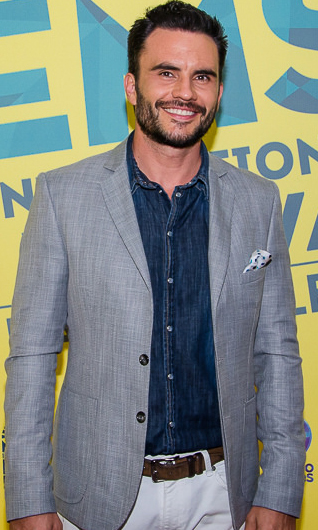
Some critics highlighted the introduction of Juan Pablo Raba as the character Joey Gutierrez, the first openly gay character in the MCU.

Eric Goldman of IGN gave the episode an 8.5 out of 10, praising the Lincoln and Daisy team up, Zimmer's portrayal of Rosalind and her dynamic with Coulson, Fitz's search for Simmons, and a quick resolution to where Simmons ended up. He also applauded the writing staff for not feeling the need to highlight all members of the team in the episode, noted by the absence of May and Ward. Brian Lowry of Variety was generally positive about the episode, stating, "Television obviously can't compete with the budgets and action found in summer blockbusters... but it has an advantage in being able to explore characters. Agents of S.H.I.E.L.D. obviously possesses a core audience drawn to those attributes, and showrunners Jed Whedon and Maurissa Tancharoen have admirably kept the plot moving ahead — engaging in larger serialized narratives — while grappling with the logistics of those ancillary considerations, which include plans for an Inhumans movie," though concluded with "there's still not a whole lot that feels particularly super about it." Kevin Fitzpatrick of ScreenCrush said, ""Laws of Nature" feels at once the show's most confident, ambitious swing yet, its action-packed opening minutes a clear mission statement with an even more specific focus than Season 2."

Writing for Vulture, Scott Meslow gave "Laws of Nature" 4 out of 5 stars, saying "as the Marvel Cinematic Universe has gotten bigger and weirder, Agents of S.H.I.E.L.D. has gotten bigger and better, and "Laws of Nature" is a strong premiere that shows off just how much this TV series has evolved." Oliver Sava of The A.V. Club gave the episode a B−, with his highlights the reveal that Simmons is on another planet, which would allow the series interesting story opportunities. Conversely, Sava felt elements of the episode were too procedural and "a surplus of infodumps that drag the pacing," and, unlike Goldman, felt leaving out May and Ward was "a big reason why this premiere is an underwhelming reintroduction to this world." He concluded, "There's lots of potential for this season to address the moral complications of S.H.I.E.L.D.'s mission, and hopefully the writers will use the themes of Civil War to explore the murky ethics of capturing and holding superpowered people against their will ... the transition into the age of Inhumanity may be a little rocky, but there's enough substance in this premiere to suggest a promising season ahead." Meslow and Sava both indicated their pleasure in the introduction of Joey Gutierrez, who Meslow noted appeared to be the first openly gay character in the MCU.

=== Accolades ===
De Caestecker was named TVLine's "Performer of the Week" for the week of September 27, 2015, for his performance in this episode, particularly the scene at the end of the episode where Fitz yells at the Monolith.
