= Chaos Theory (Agents of S.H.I.E.L.D.) =

- Agents of S.H.I.E.L.D. episode
- Episode no.: Season 3 Episode 7
- Directed by: David Solomon
- Written by: Lauren LeFranc
- Cinematography by: Feliks Parnell
- Editing by: Joshua Charson
- Original air date: November 10, 2015
- Running time: 43 minutes

Guest appearances
- Powers Boothe as Gideon Malick; Constance Zimmer as Rosalind Price; Juan Pablo Raba as Joey Gutierrez; Matthew Willig as Lash; Blair Underwood as Andrew Garner

Episode chronology
← Previous "Among Us Hide..."	Next → "Many Heads, One Tale"
- Agents of S.H.I.E.L.D. season 3

"Chaos Theory" is the seventh episode of the third season of the American television series Agents of S.H.I.E.L.D. Based on the Marvel Comics organization S.H.I.E.L.D., it follows Phil Coulson and his team of S.H.I.E.L.D. agents as they deal with the monstrous Lash. It is set in the Marvel Cinematic Universe (MCU) and acknowledges the franchise's films. The episode was written by Lauren LeFranc, and directed by David Solomon.

Clark Gregg reprises his role as Coulson from the film series, and is joined by series regulars Ming-Na Wen, Brett Dalton, Chloe Bennet, Iain De Caestecker, Elizabeth Henstridge, Nick Blood, Adrianne Palicki, Henry Simmons, and Luke Mitchell. Matthew Willig guest stars as Lash, with Blair Underwood playing his human form, Andrew Garner.

"Chaos Theory" originally aired on ABC on November 10, 2015, and according to Nielsen Media Research, was watched by 3.49 million viewers.

== Plot ==
With Werner von Strucker comatose and hospitalized, Melinda May returns to the Playground and learns Andrew Garner is at another facility, the Cocoon, re-assessing Joey Gutierrez. She goes there and confronts Andrew, revealing she knows he is Lash, at which point he panics and shoots her with an I.C.E.R. Lincoln Campbell secretly meets with Alphonso "Mack" Mackenzie, explaining he has deduced how Lash found the other Afterlife Inhumans. Jiaying had a ledger containing a list of their names, which was recovered by S.H.I.E.L.D. after her death, meaning someone inside S.H.I.E.L.D. is Lash. Meanwhile, Leo Fitz recovers data from the phone Jemma Simmons took to the barren planet, and is deeply moved when he finds a recording of her talking about the history of their friendship and the future she imagined them sharing. He also notices similarities between the logo of Project Distant Star and a symbol carved into the Monolith chamber in the Gloucestershire castle.

May awakens in a disused Culver University building, and Andrew explains that Jiaying's ledger was booby-trapped with a Terrigen crystal, which he accidentally triggered six months earlier, causing his Terrigenesis. As his transformations into the Lash form began, he found himself compelled to find other Inhumans, judge their worthiness, and kill them. He broke up with May to protect her from himself, but now he wants her to help him hunt for unworthy Inhumans. He believes she was right to kill Katya Belyakov in Bahrain, (Note: As depicted in "Melinda".) and tells her that he is following her example.

Phil Coulson arranges to attend a NORAD meeting with President Matthew Ellis, in the guise of Rosalind Price's consultant. En route Price joins him aboard the new Zephyr plane, but her and Daisy Johnson's different attitudes to dealing with new Inhumans cause friction. Upon being joined by Mack and Lincoln, Coulson deduces that Andrew is Lash, and immediately goes in search of him and May, accompanied by Daisy, Mack, Lincoln, Price and an Advanced Threat Containment Unit (ATCU) team. Coulson confronts Andrew and attempts to calm him, but Lincoln attacks Andrew in revenge for the deaths of his Afterlife friends. Transforming, Andrew defeats Lincoln, Mack and Coulson, slaughters the ATCU team, and tries to kill Price, who is saved by Daisy. May intervenes and talks Andrew down, but once he reverts to human form, she shoots him multiple times, forcing him into a containment module.

Agreeing to stay with S.H.I.E.L.D., Lincoln explains that once Andrew's Inhuman transition completes, he will remain in the form of Lash permanently. To slow this process, May agrees to let the ATCU put him in stasis, in the hope that they will find a cure. Coulson goes back to Price's apartment with her, and they have sex. She later calls Gideon Malick (an apparent colleague), who is in the middle of a meeting with Grant Ward.

== Production ==
=== Development ===
In November 2015, Marvel announced that the seventh episode of the season would be titled "Chaos Theory", to be written by Lauren LeFranc, with David Solomon directing.

=== Casting ===
In November 2015, Marvel revealed that main cast members Clark Gregg, Ming-Na Wen, Brett Dalton, Chloe Bennet, Iain De Caestecker, Elizabeth Henstridge, Nick Blood, Adrianne Palicki, Henry Simmons, and Luke Mitchell would star as Phil Coulson, Melinda May, Grant Ward, Daisy Johnson, Leo Fitz, Jemma Simmons, Lance Hunter, Bobbi Morse, Alphonso "Mack" Mackenzie, and Lincoln Campbell, respectively. It was also revealed that the guest cast for the episode would include Constance Zimmer as Rosalind Price, Matthew Willig as Lash, Juan Pablo Raba as Joey Gutierrez, Powers Boothe as Gideon Malick, Jack Guzman as S.H.I.E.L.D. agent #1 and Kyle Russell Clements as S.H.I.E.L.D. agent #2. Guzman and Clements did not receive guest star credit in the episode. Zimmer, Willig, Raba, and Boothe reprise their roles from earlier in the series. Blair Underwood also reprises his guest role of Andrew Garner.

== Broadcast ==
"Chaos Theory" was first aired in the United States on ABC on November 10, 2015.

== Reception ==
=== Ratings ===
In the United States the episode received a 1.3/4 percent share among adults between the ages of 18 and 49, meaning that it was seen by 1.3 percent of all households, and 4 percent of all of those watching television at the time of the broadcast. It was watched by 3.49 million viewers.
