= S.O.S. (Agents of S.H.I.E.L.D.) =

- Agents of S.H.I.E.L.D. episodes
- "The Art of Evolution" poster for "Part 1".
- Episode nos.: Season 2 Episodes 21 and 22
- Directed by: Vincent Misiano; Billy Gierhart
- Written by: Jeffrey Bell; Jed Whedon; Maurissa Tancharoen
- Cinematography by: Allan Westbrook; Feliks Parnell
- Editing by: Eric Litman; Joshua Charson
- Original air date: May 12, 2015
- Running time: 86 minutes

Guest appearances
- Kyle MacLachlan as Calvin Zabo; Henry Simmons as Alphonso "Mack" Mackenzie; Dichen Lachman as Jiaying; Ruth Negga as Raina; Jamie Harris as Gordon; Maya Stojan as Kara Palamas / Agent 33; Luke Mitchell as Lincoln Campbell; Christine Adams as Anne Weaver; Mark Allan Stewart as Oliver; Blair Underwood as Andrew Garner

Episode chronology
← Previous "Scars"	Next → "Laws of Nature"
- Agents of S.H.I.E.L.D. season 2

"S.O.S." is the twenty-first and twenty-second episodes and two-part season finale of the second season of the American television series Agents of S.H.I.E.L.D. Based on the Marvel Comics organization S.H.I.E.L.D., it follows Phil Coulson and his team of S.H.I.E.L.D. agents as they fight a group of Inhumans. It is set in the Marvel Cinematic Universe (MCU) and acknowledges the franchise's films. The first part was written by Jeffrey Bell and directed by Vincent Misiano. Part two was written by Jed Whedon and Maurissa Tancheroen, and directed by Billy Gierhart.

Clark Gregg reprises his role as Coulson from the film series, and is joined by series regulars Ming-Na Wen, Brett Dalton, Chloe Bennet, Iain De Caestecker, Elizabeth Henstridge, Nick Blood, and Adrianne Palicki. The episodes conclude storylines from throughout the series, and set up new plotlines and mysteries for the next season, with several recurring guest stars making appearances, including Kyle MacLachlan, Henry Simmons, Dichen Lachman, Ruth Negga, and Blair Underwood. The visual effects were completed days before the airing of the episodes, while more traditional practical effects were used where possible.

"S.O.S." originally aired on ABC on May 12, 2015, and according to Nielsen Media Research, was watched by 3.88 million viewers.

== Plot ==
=== Part one ===
Following the events of "Scars", having killed Robert Gonzales and shot herself to provoke a war between S.H.I.E.L.D. and the Inhumans, Jiaying also secretly sends Gordon and other Inhumans to hijack nearby quinjets and fire missiles at Afterlife, making it appear that S.H.I.E.L.D. is attacking. The Inhumans declare war on S.H.I.E.L.D. and attempt to force them out of Afterlife, and Skye uses her powers to defeat Melinda May, who is rescued by Jemma Simmons. Jiaying secretly drains the life force of a captured agent to heal herself. Phil Coulson realizes that Jiaying is trying to turn the Inhumans against them, and as S.H.I.E.L.D. try to respond to the crisis, Alphonso "Mack" Mackenzie, who is preparing to leave, stays on board the Iliad to help.

Having experienced more visions of the future, Raina realizes her destiny is to ensure that Skye discovers the truth about her mother and becomes the Inhumans' new leader. After telling this to an uncomprehending Skye, Raina meets with Jiaying and threatens to stop her, prompting Jiaying to kill her. Skye witnesses this, just as Raina intended, and realizes that Jiaying killed Gonzales and orchestrated the missile strike. Jiaying reluctantly has Skye knocked out and imprisoned.

Realizing Bobbi Morse is missing, Lance Hunter reviews the CCTV and sees a duplicate May leaving with her, leading him to realize Kara Palamas and Grant Ward have kidnapped her. Ward and Palamas torture Morse to get her to admit her guilt, but she is defiant, insisting she made the right decision. Hunter and May lead troops to rescue Morse, but Ward sets up a rigged gun, so that if anyone finds Morse, they will be shot dead.

Simmons learns Cal has taken an ill-conceived and potentially fatal super-strength serum. Cal suffers a heart attack, but when Simmons administers adrenaline to save him, the completed super-soldier serum causes Cal's appearance to become more monstrous and enhances his strength, and he attacks Coulson, Leo Fitz and Simmons. Meanwhile, the Inhumans seize the Iliad, but Mack evades capture. Jiaying brings a number of Terrigen crystals aboard the vessel, intending to unleash their contents upon the entire world, to cause the Terrigenesis of every dormant Inhuman, and eradicate the human race.

=== Part two ===
Pinning Cal to a wall with a truck, Coulson tells him that he is destroying himself for Jiaying, and that she is a monster, but Cal is not. Cal admits that he believed if he could find Skye, he could make Jiaying the benevolent person she was before Daniel Whitehall mutilated her. Accepting that his wife is a danger to his daughter, Cal agrees to join forces with Coulson to stop Jiaying.

In a shootout with Hunter and May's team, Palamas impersonates May to trick them, but Ward mistakes her for the real May and kills her. Morse throws herself in front of the rigged gun when Hunter finds her, and is seriously wounded. Hunter and May bring Morse back to the Playground and Simmons operates on her to save her life, before telling Fitz that she is ready to address their feelings for each other once the crisis is over.

Aboard the Iliad, Mack rescues Skye from the other Inhumans. Discovering an SOS has been sent out, Jiaying kills Oliver and several other agents with a Terrigen crystal to coerce Weaver into expanding the beacon, so that all of S.H.I.E.L.D. will come to the Iliad and be massacred by her vast Terrigen supply. Skye convinces Lincoln to help her stop Jiaying and hacks the SOS to warn Coulson of Jiaying's trap, and after warning the rest of S.H.I.E.L.D. to retreat, Coulson, May, Fitz and Cal board the Iliad. Jiaying sends Gordon to release Terrigen mists into the Iliad's ventilation, to kill all humans on board, but Mack, Coulson and Fitz fight to stop him. Fitz uses devices to contain Gordon's teleportation to the fan room, and Gordon accidentally impales himself on a piece of rebar and drops a crystal, which Coulson catches to stop it from releasing the tainted Terrigen. The crystal petrifies his left hand, but Mack severs it with an axe to save his life. Jiaying has other Terrigen crystals loaded on a quinjet to spread the mists across Earth, and tries to drain Skye's life force when she tries to stop her. Skye knocks the quinjet into the ocean with her powers, before Cal kills Jiaying.

Mack rejoins S.H.I.E.L.D. and is put in charge of all alien artifacts by Coulson, while Morse withdraws from field duty to recover from her injuries, and May takes a leave of absence to try to resume her relationship with Andrew Garner. Cal's memories are erased, and he is given a new identity as a vet named Winslow. Skye visits him after his practice opens, without revealing herself as his daughter, and begins going by her birth name, Daisy Johnson. Coulson decides to try and give the Inhumans a new purpose by forming a new S.H.I.E.L.D. team, and appoints Daisy as their leader, under Mack's supervision, and with Andrew analyzing potential candidates. As yet unbeknownst to them, the submerged quinjet has introduced Terrigen into the ecosystem, with fish drinking it resulting in tainted fish oil. Meanwhile, an embittered Ward, blaming S.H.I.E.L.D. for Palamas' death, takes command of what is left of Hydra, since Dr. List and Wolfgang von Strucker were killed in the events of Avengers: Age of Ultron.

In an end tag Fitz finally arranges a date with Simmons, but after he leaves the room, the Monolith breaks free of containment and absorbs Simmons into itself.

== Production ==
=== Development ===
In March 2015, Marvel announced that the twenty-first and twenty-second episodes of the season would be titled "S.O.S.", Part 1 and Part 2, with Part 1 written by executive producer Jeffrey Bell, and Part 2 written by executive producers Jed Whedon and Maurissa Tancharoen. Vincent Misiano directs Part 1, while Billy Gierhart directs Part 2.

=== Writing ===
On how the different storylines throughout the series lead up to this point, executive producer Jeffrey Bell stated that "The challenge that we keep seeing is keeping it fresh so it doesn't feel like the same piece of story all season. You want to find a way to mix it up. If this was an HBO show, this would be season four, and you could look back and go, well, the first season introduced these characters, the second season was more of, "oh, Hydra's in S.H.I.E.L.D.," and the third one is Skye becoming a superhero. And then getting to the middle of this season, and now we're sort of getting into this Inhuman world. We've tried to make the flavoring different, we've tried to tell different stories with different combinations of the same people so it doesn't feel like you're getting different versions of the same story every week."

Bell also discussed the end tag of the episode, where Simmons is consumed by the Kree Monolith weapon, saying "When we first started talking about the Monolith, we knew that it needed to present a threat and we needed to demonstrate some of that threat and the promise of more story, because — this is gonna shock you — we want more people to watch next year, because we like when people watch our show. It's easy to kill a character for shock value or whatever, and we did have a number of deaths this season, but I don't think they were so much for shock value as the hopefully understandable logic of the characters and the stories. We prefer to leave you with something to talk about, to walk away with. This is something that came up in the room, we talked about what it meant... The idea of getting Fitz and Simmons — who had been one person — to become two whole people, come back together, agree to go on a date, and then have this happen, felt beautifully poetic and promises some really intriguing stories next season, which is really what it's all about."

=== Casting ===
In March 2015, Marvel revealed that main cast members Clark Gregg, Ming-Na Wen, Brett Dalton, Chloe Bennet, Iain De Caestecker, Elizabeth Henstridge, Nick Blood, and Adrianne Palicki would star as Phil Coulson, Melinda May, Grant Ward, Skye, Leo Fitz, Jemma Simmons, Lance Hunter, and Bobbi Morse, respectively. It was also revealed that the guest cast for part one would include Henry Simmons as Alphonso "Mack" Mackenzie, Ruth Negga as Raina, Kyle MacLachlan as Cal, Jamie Harris as Gordon, Christine Adams as Agent Anne Weaver, Mark Allan Stewart as Agent Oliver, Maya Stojan as Kara Palamas / Agent 33, Dichen Lachman as Jiaying, Luke Mitchell as Lincoln Campbell, Kyle Mattocks as Agent Harris, Ryan Powers as S.H.I.E.L.D. tech agent and Alicia Vela-Bailey as Alisha Whitley. Simmons, Maclachlan, Harris, Adams, Stewart, Stojan, Lachman, Mitchell, and Vela-Bailey return for part two, where they are joined by Blair Underwood as Andrew Garner, Brendan Wayne as Jiaying's assistant, Robert Reinis as bartender, Daz Crawford as Kebo, and Anthony D. Washington as TAC agent #3. Mattocks, Powers, Vela-Bailey, Wayne, Reinis, Crawford, and Washington did not receive guest star credit in the episode. Simmons, Negga, MacLachlan, Harris, Adams, Stewart, Stojan, Lachman, Mitchell, and Vela-Bailey reprise their roles from earlier in the series.

=== Filming ===
To film the scene near the end of the episodes where Mack cuts off Coulson's arm, Gregg had to physically dive to show him catching a Terrigen crystal on camera, while a mechanical axe was used to cut through a "faux arm made up of tripe wrapped around a chicken thigh" to give the effect of the arm being cut off. For subsequent scenes, Gregg's wardrobe was altered to give the appearance of the missing limb.

=== Visual effects ===
Bell talked about the visual effects in general throughout the season, and in the episodes themselves, saying "Visual effects are a big part of our show and some of them are invisible and some of them are very dramatic and the fact that there's no real planes in our [show], and you just accept the fact that "oh, there's a plane" is pretty cool.... We could do it because it was our finale, but to their credit, they had very little turnaround time for any of those effects. The very last shot of the show with the Monolith and Simmons got approved Saturday". Expanding on that last shot with Simmons, visual effects supervisor Mark Kolpack explained that Henstridge was dragged away from camera on a small sled, with Houdini FX used to simulate the liquid weapon around her.

== Release ==
=== Broadcast ===
"S.O.S." was first aired in the United States on ABC on April 28, 2015.

=== Marketing ===
"The Art of Evolution" poster for "Part 2".

For the final twelve episodes of the season Marvel once again ran the "Art of..." initiative, in which an image was released the Thursday before the episode aired, depicting a first look at a key event from the upcoming episode, with the season's title being "The Art of Evolution". The different artists were once again chosen to create the teaser posters, based on their previous work and how it connected to the themes and emotion of the intended episode. For "Part 1" of the season finale, Ryan Sook's poster hints at Cal's transformation into the Mr. Hyde persona from the comics, in an homage to traditional comic book covers. For "Part 2", artist Joshua Budich brought together all of the main players of the season, divided into Coulson and his team, and those who served as antagonists to them throughout the season (though not necessarily villains), with Skye and some Terrigen crystals in the middle, pointing to Skye's confused allegiances and the importance of the crystals in the finale.

=== Home media ===
The episodes began streaming on Netflix on June 11, 2015, and were released along with the rest of the second season on September 18, 2015, on Blu-ray and DVD. The episode, along with the rest of the series, was removed from Netflix on February 28, 2022, and later became available on Disney+ on March 16, 2022.

== Reception ==
=== Ratings ===
In the United States the episode received a 1.3/4 percent share among adults between the ages of 18 and 49, meaning that it was seen by 1.3 percent of all households, and 4 percent of all of those watching television at the time of the broadcast. It was watched by 3.88 million viewers.

=== Accolades ===
In June 2016, IGN ranked the episodes together as the second best in the series.
