= Scars (Agents of S.H.I.E.L.D.) =

- Agents of S.H.I.E.L.D. episode
- "The Art of Evolution" poster for the episode.
- Episode no.: Season 2 Episode 20
- Directed by: Bobby Roth
- Written by: Rafe Judkins; Lauren LeFranc
- Cinematography by: Feliks Parnell
- Editing by: Kelly Stuyvesant
- Original air date: May 5, 2015
- Running time: 43 minutes

Guest appearances
- Kyle MacLachlan as Calvin Zabo; Henry Simmons as Alphonso "Mack" Mackenzie; Dichen Lachman as Jiaying; Ruth Negga as Raina; Jamie Harris as Gordon; Maya Stojan as Kara Palamas / Agent 33; Luke Mitchell as Lincoln Campbell; Patton Oswalt as Sam Koenig and Billy Koenig; Christine Adams as Anne Weaver; Edward James Olmos as Robert Gonzales

Episode chronology
← Previous "The Dirty Half Dozen"	Next → "S.O.S."
- Agents of S.H.I.E.L.D. season 2

"Scars" is the twentieth episode of the second season of the American television series Agents of S.H.I.E.L.D. Based on the Marvel Comics organization S.H.I.E.L.D., it follows Phil Coulson and his team of S.H.I.E.L.D. agents as they make contact with a secretive community of Inhumans. It is set in the Marvel Cinematic Universe (MCU) and acknowledges the franchise's films. The episode was written by Rafe Judkins and Lauren LeFranc, and directed by Bobby Roth.

Clark Gregg reprises his role as Coulson from the film series, and is joined by series regulars Ming-Na Wen, Brett Dalton, Chloe Bennet, Iain De Caestecker, Elizabeth Henstridge, Nick Blood, and Adrianne Palicki. The episode ties into the film Avengers: Age of Ultron, exploring the aftermath of it.

"Scars" originally aired on ABC on May 5, 2015, and according to Nielsen Media Research, was watched by 4.45 million viewers.

== Plot ==
In flashbacks to the previous year, it is revealed that Sam Koenig has been overseeing the secret Theta Protocol project, which involves refurbishing Nick Fury's disused helicarrier. This helicarrier is later used by the Avengers and Fury to rescue thousands of civilians from Sokovia during Ultron's attempt to destroy the world. (Note: During the events of Avengers: Age of Ultron.)

In the present, Coulson is allowed to be the Director of S.H.I.E.L.D. again due to his role in saving the Sokovians. The council (Robert Gonzales, Melinda May, Bobbi Morse, Anne Weaver and Oliver) become his advisors. Still unable to trust Coulson, Alphonso "Mack" Mackenzie resigns from S.H.I.E.L.D. Skye tells Coulson and May that Jiaying is her mother and that Eva Belyakov and Katya Belyakov were Inhumans, and May admits the truth about the Bahrain incident (Note: The events depicted in "Melinda".) to Coulson.

Raina is revered by the other Inhumans for her precognitive powers, and becomes content with her new form and abilities. When she mentions to Gordon that she had a vision of a stone with the ability to become a liquid, he and Jiaying explain that this is the Monolith, a Kree weapon intended to eradicate the Inhumans. Gordon's attunement to Kree technology leads him and Raina to the Monolith, which is in the Iliad's cargo hold. Lance Hunter sees them, and they are forced to flee to evade capture, after which the council plan to find the Inhumans, considering them a threat.

Using salvaged Hydra technology, Weaver is able to trace Gordon's teleportation and determine Afterlife's location. Gonzales suggests they attack, but Coulson instead sends Skye and Lincoln to liaise with the Inhumans and arrange a meeting between him and Jiaying. Raina has a vision of S.H.I.E.L.D. attacking Afterlife after the meeting, and begs Gordon to let her represent the Inhumans instead of Jiaying. Convinced that Raina is manipulating the other Inhumans and planning to seize power, Jiaying has her placed under house arrest. The council insist that Coulson should not meet with Jiaying due to his lack of objectivity concerning Skye, and Gonzales is nominated to stand in.

S.H.I.E.L.D. personnel travel to Afterlife in quinjets, but Morse's plane is hijacked by Kara Palamas posing as May. She takes Morse to a remote location, and when Morse tries to escape, Grant Ward appears and shoots her with an I.C.E.R. At Afterlife, Cal surrenders to S.H.I.E.L.D. as a gesture of goodwill from the Inhumans. Meeting in private, Jiaying shows Gonzales a Terrigen crystal, explaining that the Inhumans have never been able to remove the Diviner metal properties, making the Terrigen they produce lethal to humans. She shatters the crystal, and the Terrigen mist petrifies Gonzales, after which she shoots herself with his gun, and tells Skye and the other Inhumans that he tried to kill her.

In an end tag Ward and Palamas plan to torture Morse, in revenge for giving Palamas' location to Daniel Whitehall, which Morse did to ingratiate herself with Hydra.

== Production ==
=== Development ===
In March 2015, Marvel announced that the twentieth episode of the season would be titled "Scars", to be written by Rafe Judkins and Lauren LeFranc, with Bobby Roth directing.

=== Casting ===
In March 2015, Marvel revealed that main cast members Clark Gregg, Ming-Na Wen, Brett Dalton, Chloe Bennet, Iain De Caestecker, Elizabeth Henstridge, Nick Blood, and Adrianne Palicki would star as Phil Coulson, Melinda May, Grant Ward, Skye, Leo Fitz, Jemma Simmons, Lance Hunter, and Bobbi Morse, respectively. It was also revealed that the guest cast for the episode would include Henry Simmons as Alphonso "Mack" Mackenzie, Ruth Negga as Raina, Patton Oswalt as Sam Koenig and Billy Koenig, Kyle MacLachlan as Cal, Edward James Olmos as Robert Gonzales, Jamie Harris as Gordon, Christine Adams as Agent Anne Weaver, Mark Allan Stewart as Agent Oliver, Maya Stojan as Kara Palamas / Agent 33, Dichen Lachman as Jiaying, Luke Mitchell as Lincoln Campbell, Alicia Vela-Bailey as Alisha Whitley, David Douglas as Michael and Crystal Coney as scientist. Vela-Bailey, Douglas, and Coney did not receive guest star credit in the episode. Simmons, Negga, Oswalt, MacLachlan, Olmos, Harris, Adams, Stewart, Stojan, Lachman, and Mitchell reprise their roles from earlier in the series.

=== Marvel Cinematic Universe tie-ins ===
Following the events of "The Dirty Half Dozen" leading up to the opening scene of the film Avengers: Age of Ultron, this episode deals with the aftermath of the film, containing "plot threads and other connective tissue" with it. Comparing this tie-in to first season tie-in to Captain America: The Winter Soldier, executive producer Jeffrey Bell said, "Our stories have to stand on their own. We're not getting blown up like we were last year with Hydra and Captain America, but some elements or some things from the movie do affect some of the relationships in our episodes moving forward, in an interesting and constructive manner."

== Release ==
=== Broadcast ===
"Scars" was first aired in the United States on ABC on May 5, 2015.

=== Marketing ===
For the final twelve episodes of the season Marvel once again ran the "Art of..." initiative, in which an image was released the Thursday before the episode aired, depicting a first look at a key event from the upcoming episode, with the season's title being "The Art of Evolution". The different artists were once again chosen to create the teaser posters, based on their previous work and how it connected to the themes and emotion of the intended episode. Marguerite Sauvage provided the poster for "Scars", which prominently features Jiaying and her scars in a way that the series cannot do with special effects, while also depicting Skye near the former's stomach to cement the maternal connection between them.

=== Home media ===
The episode began streaming on Netflix on June 11, 2015, and was released along with the rest of the second season on September 18, 2015, on Blu-ray and DVD. The episode, along with the rest of the series, was removed from Netflix on February 28, 2022, and later became available on Disney+ on March 16, 2022.

== Reception ==
=== Ratings ===
In the United States the episode received a 1.5/5 percent share among adults between the ages of 18 and 49, meaning that it was seen by 1.5 percent of all households, and 5 percent of all of those watching television at the time of the broadcast. It was watched by 4.45 million viewers.
