= The Dirty Half Dozen =

- Agents of S.H.I.E.L.D. episode
- "The Art of Evolution" poster for the episode.
- Episode no.: Season 2 Episode 19
- Directed by: Kevin Tancharoen
- Written by: Brent Fletcher; Drew Z. Greenberg
- Cinematography by: Feliks Parnell
- Editing by: Joshua Charson
- Original air date: April 28, 2015
- Running time: 41 minutes

Guest appearances
- Kyle MacLachlan as Calvin Zabo; Henry Simmons as Alphonso "Mack" Mackenzie; J. August Richards as Mike Peterson / Deathlok; Dichen Lachman as Jiaying; Ruth Negga as Raina; Jamie Harris as Gordon; Maya Stojan as Kara Palamas / Agent 33; Simon Kassianides as Sunil Bakshi; Luke Mitchell as Lincoln Campbell; Henry Goodman as List; Christine Adams as Anne Weaver; Edward James Olmos as Robert Gonzales; Cobie Smulders as Maria Hill

Episode chronology
← Previous "The Frenemy of My Enemy"	Next → "Scars"
- Agents of S.H.I.E.L.D. season 2

"The Dirty Half Dozen" is the nineteenth episode of the second season of the American television series Agents of S.H.I.E.L.D. Based on the Marvel Comics organization S.H.I.E.L.D., it follows Phil Coulson and his team of S.H.I.E.L.D. agents as they infiltrate a Hydra base to rescue two of their kidnapped allies. It is set in the Marvel Cinematic Universe (MCU) and acknowledges the franchise's films. The episode was written by Brent Fletcher and Drew Z. Greenberg, and directed by Kevin Tancharoen.

Clark Gregg reprises his role as Coulson from the film series, and is joined by series regulars Ming-Na Wen, Brett Dalton, Chloe Bennet, Iain De Caestecker, Elizabeth Henstridge, Nick Blood, and Adrianne Palicki. Recurring guest stars Luke Mitchell and J. August Richards portray Lincoln Campbell and Deathlok, the kidnapped allies, while Henry Goodman and Cobie Smulders reprise their roles of Dr. List and Maria Hill from the films in a tie-in with Avengers: Age of Ultron; the episode includes easter eggs and plot threads leading into the opening scene of that film. The episode also features two significant sequences, a one-take fight scene that Bennet broke her arm filming, and the dramatic destruction of a plane which was realised through visual effects and CGI.

"The Dirty Half Dozen" originally aired on ABC on April 28, 2015, and, according to Nielsen Media Research, was watched by 7.24 million viewers within a week of its release. The episode received positive reviews, with critics praising Tancharoen's choreography and direction of the fight sequences (particularly the one-take fight), and generally feeling positive about the film tie-in as well. It was nominated for a Primetime Emmy Award for Outstanding Special Visual Effects at the 67th Primetime Creative Arts Emmy Awards.

== Plot ==
Gordon fails to rescue Lincoln Campbell from Hydra, and Raina recognizes the injuries he receives from a dream she once had, discovering her new Inhuman precognitive abilities. S.H.I.E.L.D. Director Phil Coulson offers a truce to the group of agents who oppose his leadership, agreeing to unlock Nick Fury's "toolbox", containing his secret files on S.H.I.E.L.D. and many known enhanced individuals, for them in exchange for their help in fighting Hydra. Coulson also works with Grant Ward, a former S.H.I.E.L.D.-turned-Hydra agent who has agreed to temporarily work with the team in exchange for Coulson's protection of Kara Palamas, another former S.H.I.E.L.D. agent who was brainwashed by Hydra. Sunil Bakshi, the Hydra agent who brainwashed Palamas and was subsequently brainwashed himself by Ward, reveals the location of Hydra's Arctic base, where Agent Mike Peterson is being experimented on alongside Campbell.

After Jiaying refuses to risk anyone else to rescue Campbell, Raina receives a vision of Skye saving him, and convinces Gordon to take Skye to the Playground, S.H.I.E.L.D.'s base. Coulson reforms his original S.H.I.E.L.D. team of Melinda May, Ward, Skye, Leo Fitz and Jemma Simmons, and they fly to the Arctic in their old mobile command base, a plane called the Bus. Their approach is detected by Hydra, who shoot down the Bus with missiles, but the team escape in a quinjet and infiltrate the base with Bakshi's help. Coulson, May, and Fitz break into the base's control rooms to steal information about Hydra leader Wolfgang von Strucker's primary headquarters in the small Eastern European nation of Sokovia, while Skye, Ward, Bakshi, and Simmons rescue Peterson and Campbell. During the rescue, Simmons attempts to kill Ward as she once promised she would, but Bakshi gets in the way and Simmons murders him instead, and Ward flees after sparing Simmons' life.

The team escape the Hydra base as S.H.I.E.L.D. forces bomb it. Jiaying's ex-husband Cal warns her of Raina's power, believing that she will soon stage a coup for leadership of the Inhumans. Coulson contacts Maria Hill to inform her of Strucker's headquarters and his possession of Loki's scepter. As Hill prepares to call in the Avengers to deal with Strucker, Raina has a vision of the scepter and the terrible consequences of the Avengers retrieving it, witnessing "men made of metal" tearing cities apart. (Note: As happened during Avengers: Age of Ultron.)

== Production ==
=== Development ===
In July 2014, the executive producers stated that they had plans to incorporate Cobie Smulders' Maria Hill into the second season, leading to a cameo appearance at the end of this episode. In March 2015, Marvel announced that the nineteenth episode of the season would be titled "The Dirty Half Dozen", to be written by Brent Fletcher and Drew Z. Greenberg, with Kevin Tancharoen directing.

=== Casting ===
The starring cast was confirmed to include Clark Gregg as Phil Coulson, Ming-Na Wen as Melinda May, Brett Dalton as Grant Ward, Chloe Bennet as Skye, Iain De Caestecker as Leo Fitz, Elizabeth Henstridge as Jemma Simmons, Nick Blood as Lance Hunter, and Adrianne Palicki as Bobbi Morse.

It was also revealed that the guest cast for the episode would include Henry Simmons as Alphonso "Mack" Mackenzie, Ruth Negga as Raina, Henry Goodman as Dr. List, J. August Richards as Mike Peterson / Deathlok, Kyle MacLachlan as Cal, Edward James Olmos as Robert Gonzales, Jamie Harris as Gordon, Christine Adams as Agent Anne Weaver, Mark Allan Stewart as Agent Oliver, Maya Stojan as Kara Palamas / Agent 33, Dichen Lachman as Jiaying, Luke Mitchell as Lincoln Campbell and Chad Cleven as a Hydra tactical agent. Stewart and Cleven did not receive guest star credit in the episode. Simon Kassianides also guest stars. Simmons, Negga, Goodman, Richards, MacLachlan, Olmos, Harris, Adams, Stewart, Stojan, Lachman, Mitchell, and Kassianides reprise their roles from earlier in the series.

With the episode exploring the new clairvoyant abilities of Negga's Raina, executive producer Maurissa Tancharoen noted the irony of this, as Raina had spent much of her time on the series obsessed with another character who she believed was clairvoyant. On the death of his character in the episode, Kassianides said, "I'm sad to see him go, [but] I'm happy to see someone like that get their comeuppance". Noting that the character was originally intended to be killed off in "A Hen in the Wolf House", Kassianides felt that the way Bakshi and his relationships had developed throughout the season was "fantastic" and made the character's final sacrifice a much more "beautiful" death.

=== Filming ===
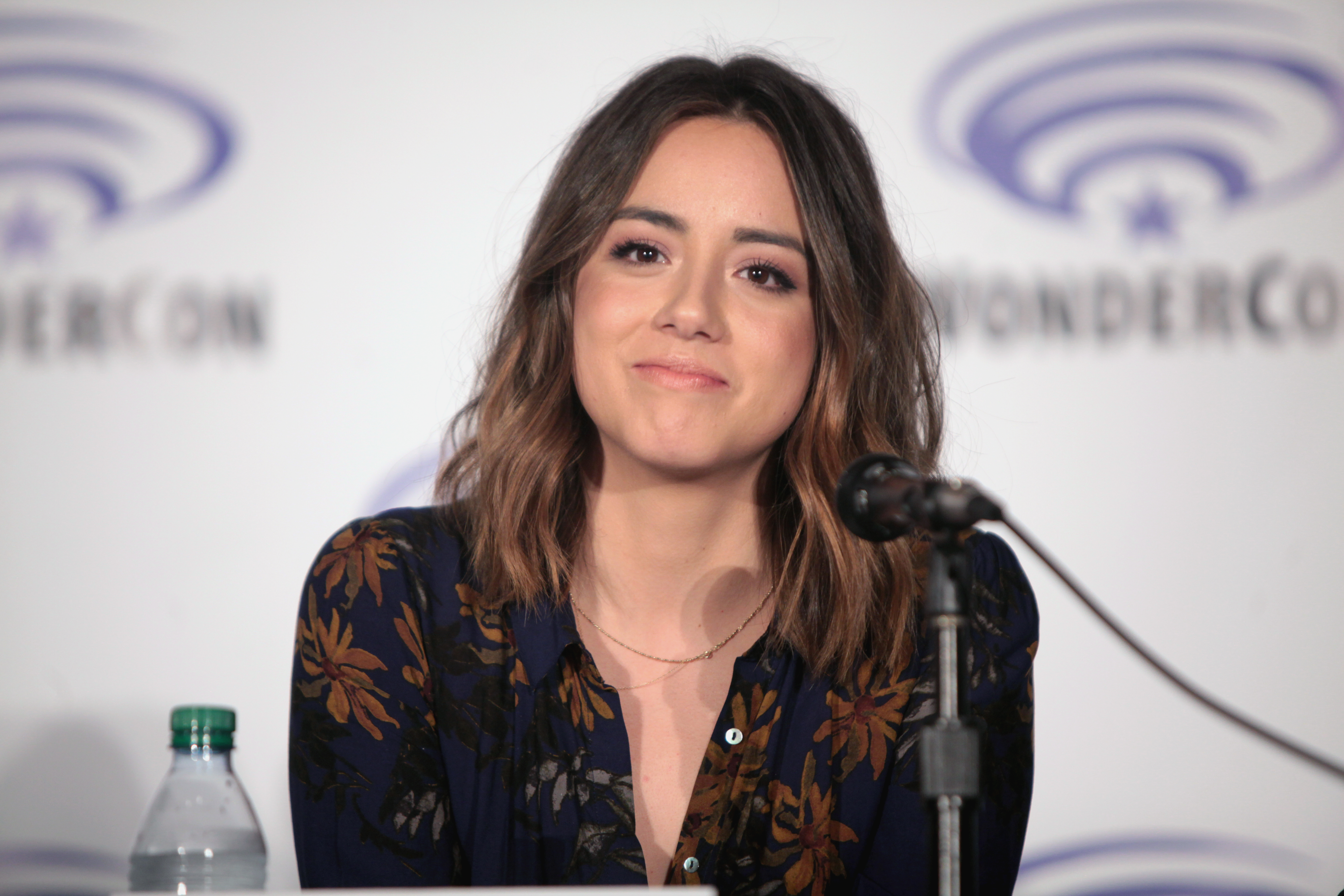
Actress Chloe Bennet broke her arm while filming the episodes' one-take fight sequence

Director Tancharoen and the series' stunt team, led by stunt coordinator Tanner Gill and fight choreographer Matt Mullins, created a previsualization of a fight sequence between the character Skye and several Hydra agents in which it would be filmed in a single take. Tancharoen and Mullins conceived the idea while looking for a way to top the "May vs. May" fight in "Face My Enemy". The executive producers were enthusiastic about the idea being used, and the actors, including Bennet, rehearsed the sequence on the prior weekend, for "a couple of hours" at a "gymnastics place".

Because the series' production doesn't build sets till "a couple of days before the shoot or even the day before the shoot or, sometimes even the morning of the shoot" the stunt team was not able to coordinate with the art department and set decorators in the construction of the set, so the fight sequence had to be slightly reconfigured on the day of the shoot to fit the set. A steam effect in the sequence proved difficult due to the special effects operator having to time it with Bennet's shooting, working around a delay in the air canister system of several seconds. Tancharoen used a handheld camera, with the operator having to "run all over the place with this really heavy camera on his shoulder", but wanted to move away from the Jason Bourne, shaky-cam style of filming, saying that because of his background in choreography, "It's drilled in my head that the camera has to complement the movement of the action." The shot took four takes to get right, with Bennet breaking her arm during the filming of the final take, and having to carry out the rest of her fight scenes for the season with the injury.

=== Visual effects ===
For the destruction of the Bus, S.H.I.E.L.D.'s plane that serves as a mobile command center, series lead visual effects provider FuseFX were able to storyboard and plot out the sequence earlier than usual, before creating a completely computer generated sequence in which the plane is hit by a missile while flying in the arctic. As the plane is brought down, "pieces of wreckage catch fire and burn as they fall to earth. There is also a smaller plane that flies through the airborne debris. It's a very complex sequence, combining CG, effects simulations and pyrotechnics." Series visual effects supervisor Mark Kolpack elaborated that "Doing fire realistically on television is a tall order. You don't get the representation of what a real fire element looks like using software, but the guys at FuseFX, those FX animators are amazing. It takes a long time and a lot of set up to get things right. And it wasn't just the fire, it was the smoke and the debris, and then it was the cloaking device, and May [show star Ming-Na Wen] in the cockpit and it was May on bluescreen. Between Houdini and the particles we had to create for that one shot—a big giant virtual shot where we had a QuinJet come down and all the debris is falling all around and there's fire and smoke, that sequence was what that episode was about. It was a big scene to pull off."

For Bakshi's death-by-splinter bomb, the visual effects team had created the effect before for earlier episodes, so they had that "pretty much dialed in". Kolpack explained that Kassianides "was shot against greenscreen and background plates, and we added several layers of different erosion techniques, taking his body away, and then having all the actual particles dynamically coming off of him as he moved."

=== Marvel Cinematic Universe tie-ins ===
"The Dirty Half Dozen" features "Easter eggs, plot threads and other connective tissue leading into the opening scene of Avengers: Age of Ultron", including the appearance of Goodman as List and Smulders as Hill, reprising their roles from the films. Executive producer Jed Whedon described the tie-in as more "nuanced" than the previous one, which connected the series to Captain America: The Winter Soldier, given that the crossover has relatively little impact on the ongoing storylines of the season.

== Release ==
=== Broadcast ===
"The Dirty Half Dozen" was first aired in the United States on ABC on April 28, 2015.

=== Marketing ===
For the final twelve episodes of the season Marvel once again ran the "Art of..." initiative, in which an image was released the Thursday before the episode aired, depicting a first look at a key event from the upcoming episode, with the season's title being "The Art of Evolution". The different artists were once again chosen to create the teaser posters, based on their previous work and how it connected to the themes and emotion of the intended episode. The poster for "The Dirty Half Dozen", with art by Jake Wyatt, sees the original recruits to Coulson's S.H.I.E.L.D. team from the first season (May, Ward, Fitz, Simmons and Skye), along with Coulson, together once again, suiting up for a mission together. It is the first poster of the "Art of..." series to also feature the episode's title.

=== Home media ===
The episode began streaming on Netflix on June 11, 2015, and was released along with the rest of the second season on Blu-ray and DVD on September 18, 2015. The episode, along with the rest of the series, was removed from Netflix on February 28, 2022, and later became available on Disney+ on March 16, 2022.

== Reception ==
=== Ratings ===
In the United States, the episode received a 1.5/5 percent share of the Nielsen ratings, among adults between the ages of 18 and 49. This means that it was seen by 1.5 percent of all households, and 5 percent of all of those watching television at the time of the broadcast. It was watched by 4.57 million viewers. The episode was the second most watched in the timeslot, behind NCIS: New Orleans. Within seven days the episode had been watched by a total of 7.24 million U.S. viewers, just over the season average of 7.09 million.

=== Critical response ===
Eric Goldman of IGN scored the episode an 8.5 out of 10, indicating a "great" episode, highlighting the reunion of the six original team members and their evolved dynamic, despite what he called a "contrived" set up for that situation. He felt that using the characters of List and Hill to tie the series into Age of Ultron was "the right way" to tie the two together, and was also positive of the character beats for Simmons and Palamas. Goldman also made special mention of Tancharoen's direction of the one-shot fight, though he felt that Tancharoen's May vs. Agent 33 fight from "Face My Enemy" was the superior sequence, and of the visual effects for the shooting down of the Bus. The A.V. Club's Oliver Sava graded "The Dirty Half Dozen" a "B+", also noting that "has to take some shortcuts to reunite the original team, but the momentum picks up considerably once everyone is in the same room". Discussing the changes in the main characters from the start of the series, Sava particularly noted the development of Skye into "kick-ass Agent of S.H.I.E.L.D.", and praised Tancharoen as "the one director on this series that is really going out of his way to create memorable action sequences". Sava called the Age of Ultron tie-in "overt", with Raina's clairvoyance "a convenient plot device to put certain pieces in place", but ultimately felt that "those big-screen connections don't interrupt the focus on relationships".

Marc Buxton at Den of Geek scored the episode 3.5 out of 5, calling the Age of Ultron tie-in "anti-climactic ... it felt like a bit of a cheat", criticizing what he saw as too much of S.H.I.E.L.D.'s own storyline being left for the film to resolve, but said that "all in all, it was a rather good episode". Buxton said that Skye "really shined this episode", and called her one-shot fight "worthy of a rewind or two", while highlighting "one of the biggest character moments" in the episode with Simmons' decision to kill Ward. Rob Leane, also at Den of Geek, was more positive of the Age of Ultron tie-in, calling it "the next best allusion to the movies we've ever had" following the series' connections to Captain America: The Winter Soldier, and praising the use of List and Hill. He positively compared Skye's one-shot fight sequence to the well known single-take sequences in The Avengers and Daredevil, calling it "the very welcome TV equivalent" of the "air-punching fan-pleasing moments" often found in Marvel's films. Leane also compared Coulson's "real mission-within-a-mission" reveal to a similar moment in The Winter Soldier, and summarized "The Dirty Half Dozen" as "a thoroughly entertaining episode, thanks in equal part to the tie-in stuff, some solid action and several strong character moments. Ward's return was handled well, too, although something needs to be done about Simmons' growing unlikeable-ness."

Joseph McCabe, reviewing the episode for Nerdist, gave a positive review, saying that the episode "pulls off the neat trick of tying into [Age of Ultron] without necessarily feeling like an ad for it", and feeling that it benefited "immensely from the skills of S.H.I.E.L.D.'s best director" in Tancharoen and his choreography of the one-shot fight sequence. He also praised all of the character pairings that the action-heavy episode managed to explore, and positively compared the overall episode to "a kind of thinking person's G.I. Joe ... it's satisfying to see [Agents of S.H.I.E.L.D.'s] original lineup on one more Joe-like mission."

=== Accolades ===
The episode was nominated for Outstanding Special and Visual Effects at the 67th Primetime Creative Arts Emmy Awards, but lost the award to the Game of Thrones episode "The Dance of Dragons".
