= Pilot (Agents of S.H.I.E.L.D.) =

- Agents of S.H.I.E.L.D. episode
- Episode no.: Season 1 Episode 1
- Directed by: Joss Whedon
- Written by: Joss Whedon; Jed Whedon; Maurissa Tancharoen
- Cinematography by: David Boyd
- Editing by: Paul Trejo; Joshua Charson
- Original air date: September 24, 2013
- Running time: 45 minutes

Guest appearances
- J. August Richards as Mike Peterson; Shannon Lucio as Debbie; Ron Glass as Dr. Streiten; Bob Stephenson as Gary; Cobie Smulders as Maria Hill

Episode chronology
← Previous —	Next → "0-8-4"
- Agents of S.H.I.E.L.D. season 1

"Pilot" is the pilot and first episode of the first season of the American television series Agents of S.H.I.E.L.D. Based on the Marvel Comics organization S.H.I.E.L.D., it follows Phil Coulson and his new team of S.H.I.E.L.D. agents. The first television episode to be set in the Marvel Cinematic Universe (MCU), it acknowledges the continuity of the franchise's films. The episode was written by series creators Joss Whedon, Jed Whedon, and Maurissa Tancharoen, and was directed by Joss Whedon.

Clark Gregg reprises his role as Coulson from the film series, starring alongside Ming-Na Wen, Brett Dalton, Chloe Bennet, Iain De Caestecker, and Elizabeth Henstridge. The pilot was ordered in 2012, after Joss Whedon wrote and directed The Avengers (2012). It was filmed in early 2013 in Los Angeles, with additional filming in Paris. Cobie Smulders guest stars, reprising her role of Maria Hill from The Avengers, with previous Whedon collaborators J. August Richards and Ron Glass also guest starring. Emphasis was put on consistency with the MCU films, including reusing elements from them such as the substance Extremis from Iron Man 3 (2013).

"Pilot" originally aired on ABC on September 24, 2013, and was watched by 12.12 million viewers, the highest ratings received by the first episode of a drama series since 2009. The episode received mostly positive reviews, particularly for Joss Whedon's work and Richards' performance, but some critics were disappointed that the episode did not reach the standard of the MCU films. The use of the name "Rising Tide" for a hacktivist group in the episode received backlash from a real-life group of the same name. The episode received a nomination for Outstanding Visual Effects in a Broadcast Program at the 12th Visual Effects Society Awards and Best Sound Editing – Short Form: Music at the 61st Golden Reel Awards

== Plot ==
After the events of Iron Man 3, Mike Peterson is out with his son, Ace, when the top floor of a nearby building explodes. Peterson uses enhanced strength to save Debbie, a trapped woman from the building, and is filmed doing so by Skye, a member of the hacktivist group the Rising Tide.

After Grant Ward recovers a Chitauri Neural Link from a flat owned by a black market dealer named T. Vanchat, S.H.I.E.L.D. deputy director Maria Hill interviews him for a new assignment. Agent Phil Coulson, who is officially dead, walks in alive, assigns Ward level 7 security clearance, and reveals the team's first mission is to investigate the Rising Tide. Coulson also recruits the reluctant Agent Melinda May, who had previously retired from field duty.

Skye meets with Peterson and warns him about S.H.I.E.L.D.'s penchant for covering up superhero-based events. She is shortly arrested by Coulson, and placed in the S.H.I.E.L.D. team's mobile base of operations, a modified Boeing C-17 Globemaster III nicknamed the Bus. During questioning, Coulson slowly begins to gain her trust, and she reveals her limited knowledge of the mysterious Project Centipede and the location of the explosion; Agents Leo Fitz and Jemma Simmons go to investigate the scene.

Peterson returns to the factory he was recently fired from, and injures his former boss, calling him the "bad guy" and himself the "hero". Peterson then visits the woman he saved in the hospital, who is actually the doctor that gave him his abilities by implanting the Centipede device in his arm. She warns him against revealing his abilities to the public, which would be against the wishes of her backers. Fitz and Simmons discover from a damaged Centipede device, found at the explosion scene, that it combines several previously known sources of superpowers, including Extremis, and it was the unstable Extremis within a previous Centipede-created superhero that had caused the explosion.

Peterson abducts Skye and makes her delete his and Ace's personal information from the government's systems, though she manages to warn the team at the same time. The two are tracked to a train station by Coulson's team and a gunman sent by Peterson's doctor. May takes out the gunman, and Ward shoots Peterson with an advanced stun gun developed by Fitz and Simmons, which stabilizes his Extremis. Afterwards, Coulson offers Skye a place on his team when a call for an "0-8-4" comes in.

== Production ==
=== Development ===
In August 2012, ABC ordered a pilot from Joss Whedon, who wrote and directed the Marvel Cinematic Universe (MCU) film The Avengers (2012), for a television series set within the MCU. ABC president Paul Lee compared the pilot to the series Once Upon a Time, in terms of budgetary and technological ambition, and spoke of his excitement for the crossover potential with the larger film universe. The pilot was executive produced by Joss Whedon, Jed Whedon, Maurissa Tancharoen, Jeffrey Bell, and Jeph Loeb.

=== Writing ===
Joss Whedon explained that his previous television shows were based on ensembles, with S.H.I.E.L.D. being based in part on the Buffy the Vampire Slayer episode "The Zeppo". That episode highlighted a lesser seen character, which was something he wanted to achieve with the character of Agent Phil Coulson. The pilot was written by Whedon, along with his brother Jed Whedon and sister-in-law Maurissa Tancharoen. At the same time, Joss was writing the script for Avengers: Age of Ultron (2015), which meant that he could use the series to explain the resurrection of Coulson rather than trying to include it in that film. He revealed that he received notes from ABC on things to change in the pilot, but noted that the network was encouraging and excited about the project, so "you take the notes. You don't take all of them. But you never walk in expecting not to get any." At the 2013 San Diego Comic-Con, Tancharoen talked about telling a Marvel story on a television budget, calling it a challenge but noting that the series is "looking at it through a different lens"; it tells the human stories in the superhuman universe, with Coulson—the human, grounded character in the films—leading a team of "real people", albeit extremely skilled people.

=== Casting ===
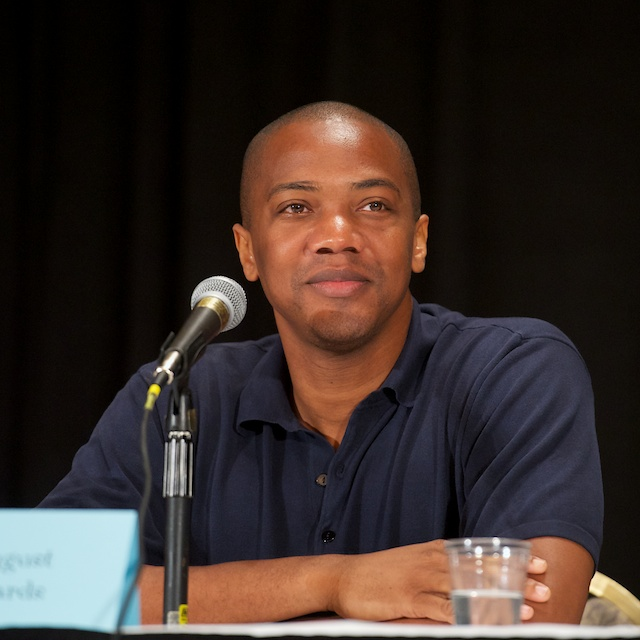
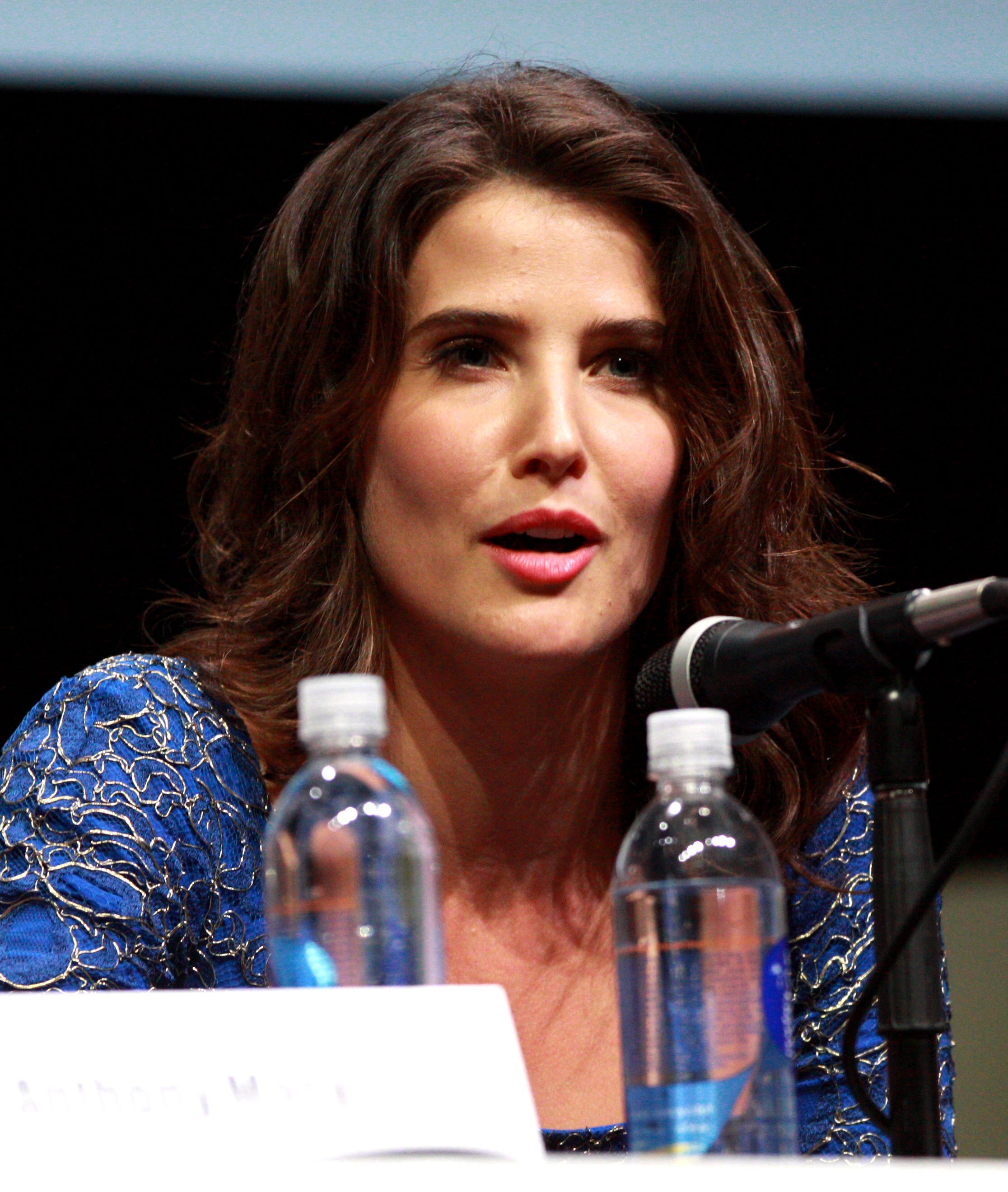
J. August Richards and Cobie Smulders were two of the guest stars in the pilot.

In October 2012, a casting sheet for five lead roles was released. At New York Comic Con later that month, Joss Whedon, Kevin Feige, and Clark Gregg announced that Gregg, who portrayed Phil Coulson in the MCU films Iron Man (2008), Iron Man 2 (2010), Thor (2011), and The Avengers, as well as the Marvel One-Shots short films, would be reprising his role in the pilot. In late October, actress Ming-Na Wen was cast as agent Melinda May. The next month, Elizabeth Henstridge, Iain De Caestecker, and newcomer Brett Dalton were cast as agents Jemma Simmons, Leo Fitz, and Grant Ward, respectively. In December, Chloe Bennet was cast as Skye, the sixth and final main cast member.

Cobie Smulders, who portrayed Maria Hill in The Avengers, indicated in January 2013 that she would be open to appearing in the series. That July it was confirmed that she would guest star in the pilot, with Whedon stating that he wanted to include Smulders because "she is S.H.I.E.L.D. She's cool and commanding and has the dry humor that plays so well with Clark's." Other guest stars in the episode include two actors from other Joss Whedon television shows: Ron Glass, who played Shepherd Book in Firefly and the subsequent film Serenity (2005), appears in "Pilot" as S.H.I.E.L.D. doctor Streiten; and J. August Richards, who appeared in Whedon's Angel as Charles Gunn, portrays the character Mike Peterson. Whedon auditioned other actors without luck, before considering Richards late in the casting process. Additionally, Shannon Lucio and Bob Stephenson guest star as the Centipede doctor Debbie and Mike's former boss Gary, respectively.

=== Filming ===
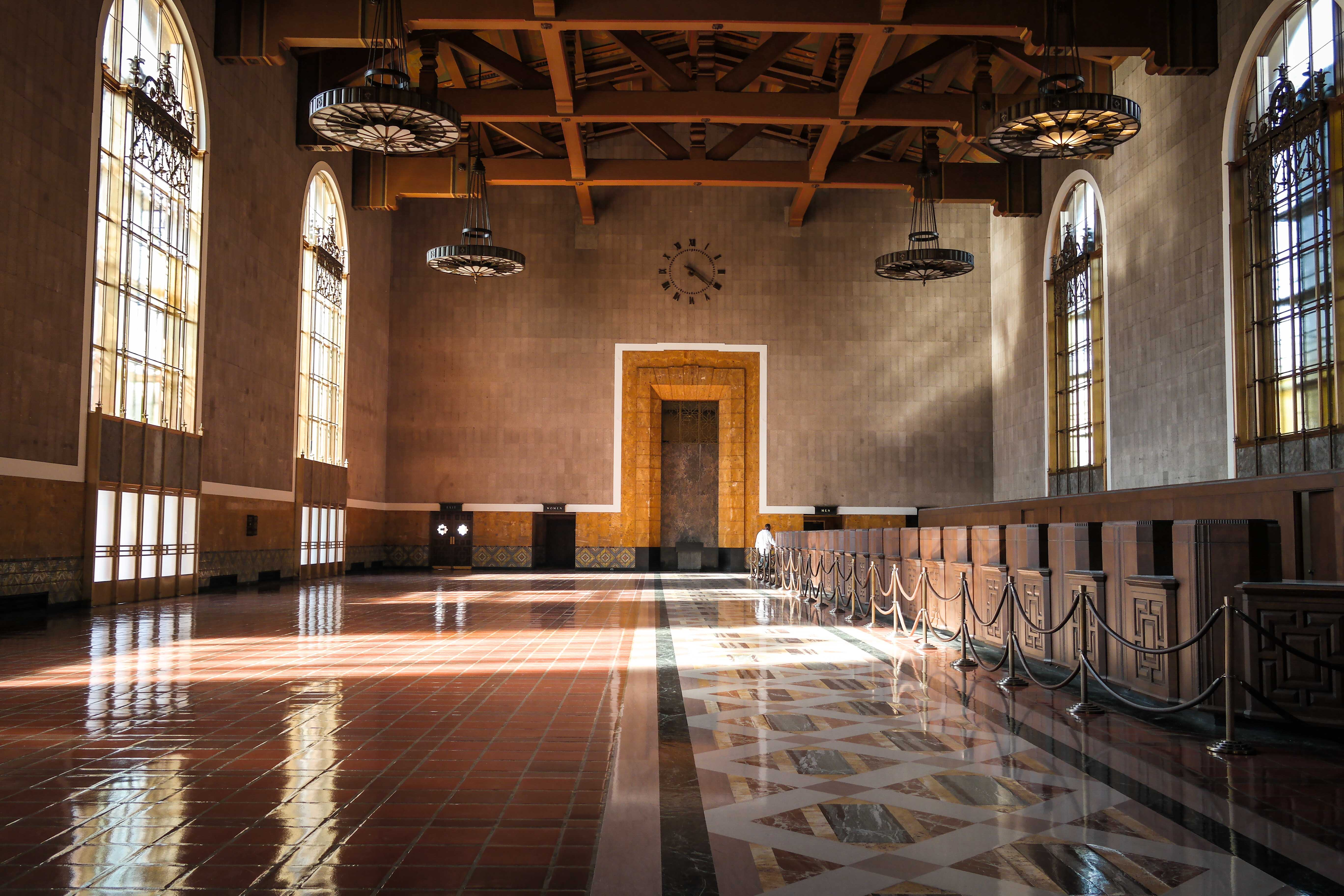
The interior of Union Station, where location filming occurred

Construction on the sets for the Bus' interior, interrogation room, and Fitz and Simmons' lab, along with Debbie's charred lab and the Paris apartment, began on December 6, 2012. Filming on the pilot, under the name S.H.I.E.L.D., began on January 22, 2013, in Los Angeles where Joss Whedon was working on other projects. David Boyd served as director of photography. On the first day of shooting the pilot, images of vehicles meant to be kept secret during production had already been leaked online, quickly showing the producers how difficult dealing with secrecy on a Marvel project would be. Location shooting took place at Los Angeles' Union Station for four days beginning on January 30. The production was the first to shoot on the east side of the station, in its newly built escalator atrium. Bell served as second unit director while at Union Station. Principal photography concluded on February 11, with Smulders filming her role on the final day to accommodate her filming on How I Met Your Mother. Additional filming then took place in Paris on February 14 and 15, which Dalton said lent the episode "a kind of authenticity". When the series' crew was scouting locations in Paris, the weather was "almost too perfect", but during filming it was foggy and raining. Dalton described this as "more authentic" since it prevented the location from being unnecessarily "picaresque".

=== Visual effects ===
Visual effects supervisor Mark Kolpack wanted to ensure that the audience could not tell the difference in quality between the pilot and what they were accustomed to seeing in the MCU films. For the opening sequence when Mike Peterson saves Debbie, digital doubles for the actors were created to transition between footage shot with stunt double and footage of Peterson and Luccio. The final shot of Lola flying was achieved with a scissor lift to mimic the car rising off the road, along with a CGI version and green screen filming.

=== Marvel Cinematic Universe tie-ins ===
The episode uses the Extremis virus from Iron Man 3 as one source of power for the character of Mike Peterson. Executive producer Jeffrey Bell explained that the idea of using it came up independent of the film, but the crew realized that it would be a good opportunity to tie in with the films, and worked with Marvel Studios on the tie-in to ensure that "they didn't feel like we were just ripping off their idea." Additional sources of power for the character include Chitauri technology, from The Avengers and the Marvel One-Shot Item 47 (2012); and super-soldier serum, from Captain America: The First Avenger (2011) and The Incredible Hulk (2008). Centipede was introduced in such a way to aid audience members that might have been unfamiliar with the Marvel universe. The events of The Avengers are referenced numerous times throughout the episode, and archive footage from the film is briefly used in an opening montage. Also, Coulson's flying car is a working model of the prototype seen in Captain America: The First Avenger.

== Marketing ==
The first television spot for the episode was released on May 12, 2013, during the second season finale of Once Upon a Time. It featured footage from The Avengers and new footage from the episode, and was compared to the Marvel One-Shots. Two days later an extended trailer was released, "devoted to expository dialogue, setting up the characters and establishing the pecking order". "Pilot" was screened at San Diego Comic-Con on July 19, 2013, and was met with a positive reaction from the crowd. As part of a viral marketing campaign, posters asking for witnesses of "Suspected Extraordinary Activity" were placed around London ahead of the episode's airing in the UK.

== Release ==
=== Broadcast ===
"Pilot" was first aired in the United States on ABC on September 24, 2013. It was aired alongside the U.S. broadcast in Canada on CTV, while it was first aired in the United Kingdom on Channel 4 on September 27, 2013. It premiered on the Seven Network in Australia on October 2, 2013, and on TV2 in New Zealand on February 16, 2014.

=== Home media ===
The episode, along with the rest of Agents of S.H.I.E.L.D.'s first season, was released on Blu-ray and DVD on September 9, 2014. Bonus features include behind-the-scenes featurettes, audio commentary, deleted scenes, and a blooper reel. It was released in Region 2 on October 20, and in Region 4 on November 11, 2014. On November 20, 2014, the episode became available for streaming on Netflix. The episode, along with the rest of the series, was removed from Netflix on February 28, 2022, and later became available on Disney+ on March 16, 2022.

== Reception ==
=== Ratings ===
In the United States the episode received a 4.7/14 percent share among adults between the ages of 18 and 49, meaning that it was seen by 4.7 percent of all households, and 14 percent of all of those watching television at the time of the broadcast. It was watched by 12.12 million viewers. This was the highest ratings received by the first episode of a drama series in the United States for almost four years since the pilot episode of ABC's V, however NCIS was the most viewed show in the time slot with more than 20 million viewers. "Pilot" was watched by 2.71 million viewers during its Canadian premiere, earning the third highest viewership for the week on the network. It was watched by 14.2 percent of all viewers in the UK watching television at the time of the broadcast, an average of 3.1 million. The broadcast had a 27 percent share of those aged between 16 and 34. It was the most viewed new drama on Channel 4 in 2013. The Seven Network premiere in Australia was watched by 1.3 million viewers, the top show of the night. In New Zealand, the first episode premiered to 326,790 viewers, the fourth highest show of the night, and the most watched show on TV2.

=== Critical response ===
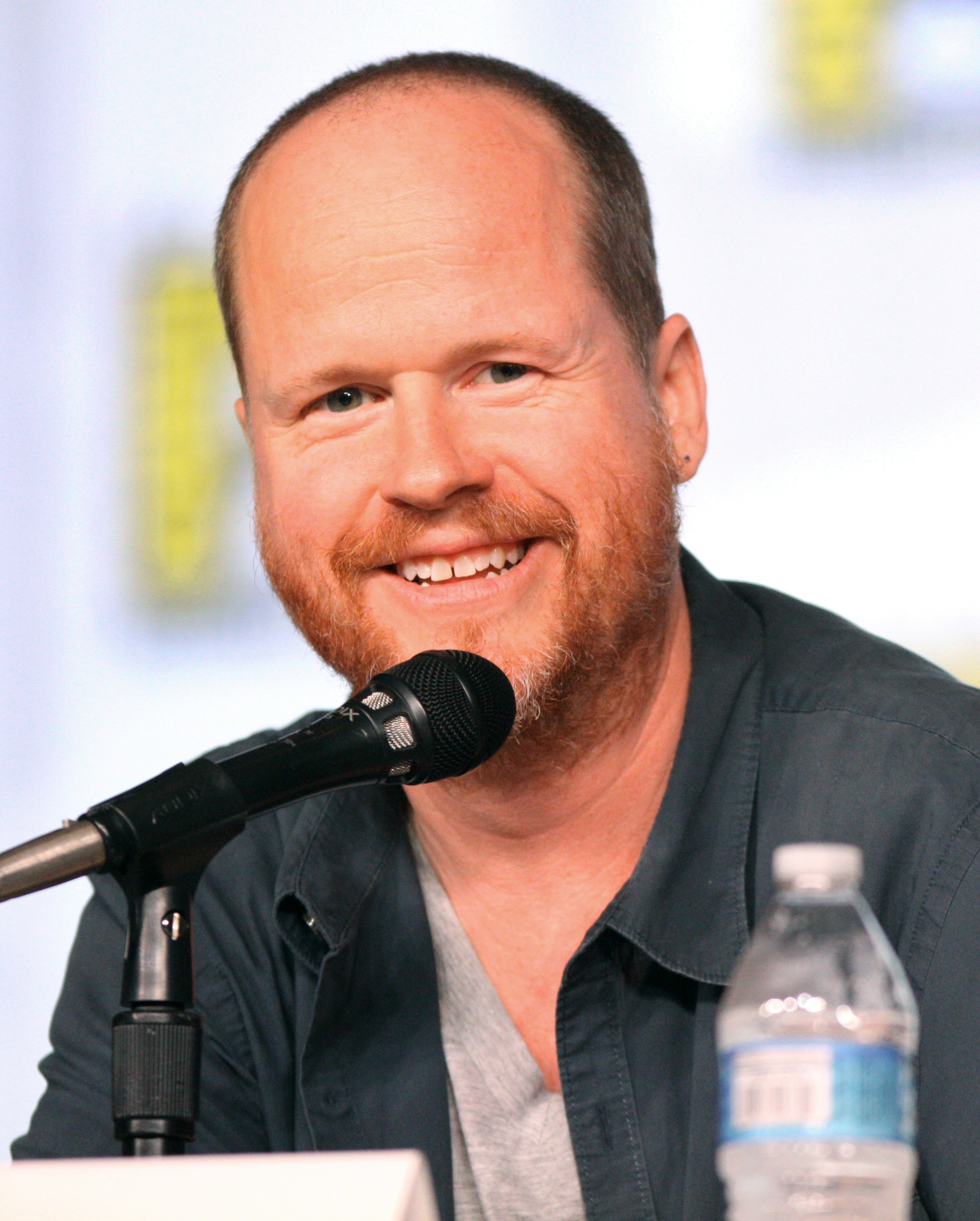
Much of the critical response to "Pilot" took writer and director Joss Whedon's involvement into consideration.

Jason Hughes of The Huffington Post said that "Everything about this premiere worked". He felt that the show was a cross between Fringe and Heroes with elements of The X-Files included. He thought that there was a potential for the series to be a success and thought that it would attract both Marvel fans and new viewers alike. Dave Bradley gave the episode four and a half out of five for SFX magazine, saying that the show was going to become a phenomenon alongside Doctor Who, The Walking Dead and Game of Thrones. He felt that using the Skye character to introduce the viewer to the series was cheesy, but effective. He praised J August Richards' performance but did not enjoy some of the characterizations of the main characters, which made him think the team was similar to that seen in Torchwood.

Eric Goldman at IGN rated "Pilot" 8.5 out of 10, stating that the "inspired collaboration" between Joss Whedon and Marvel that began with The Avengers is highly entertaining, and should keep fans wanting more, but noting that viewers wanting the series to have the same scale as the MCU films "will be disappointed – this is a high budget TV series, but it is a TV series". Emily St. James of The A.V. Club gave the episode a "B", feeling that the episode had enough "fun and funny moments" to indicate that the series could "settle into a groove with time", but also that there were cautious and predictable moments, and that even at its best, the episode feels like "the product of several hundred cooks." Brian Lowry, writing for Variety, found the episode to be "OK", finding some dialogue to be "a little precious and clunky" and feeling the plot to be "yet another twist on a procedural, albeit with a few mythological elements to sweeten the experience", summing that "with great boxoffice and ostentatious synergy come super-sized expectations." Tim Goodman of The Hollywood Reporter was not sure from the pilot whether the series would go on to be good or not. He thought that having Joss Whedon's name attached the project would lead to positive reviews for at least a month. Goodman said that "It's a fun hour and calling it 'good but not great' has more to do with expectations in the wake of the Marvel movies than anything else."

Jim Steranko, known for his work on Nick Fury, Agent of S.H.I.E.L.D., felt the episode was unfocused and "had no menace, no tension". He lamented the absence of Samuel L. Jackson's Nick Fury, and felt the episode needed "to be much tougher, much stranger, much edgier to reach its potential". James Hunt of Den of Geek, thought that the episode struggled to meet expectations. He thought that the CGI was worse than that seen on Smallville and that the sets seemed small. However, he praised the script and in particular the speech given by Richards' character at the end of the episode. He thought that the start was better than Whedon's Dollhouse, but was not perfect.

=== Accolades ===
"Pilot" was nominated for Outstanding Visual Effects in a Broadcast Program at the 12th Visual Effects Society Awards, but lost to the Game of Thrones episode "Valar Dohaeris". It was also nominated for Best Sound Editing – Short Form: Music at the 61st Golden Reel Awards, but lost to the Game of Thrones episode "The Rains of Castamere".

=== Controversy ===
The episode introduced a group called the "Rising Tide", also the name of a real-life volunteer group who work on climate change issues. The group issued a statement saying that they were concerned with the use of the name for the fictional group which appeared to be similar to Anonymous. They have since been mistakenly contacted on Twitter by fans of Agents of S.H.I.E.L.D. and have created a petition against The Walt Disney Company to stop using the name.
