= Melinda May =

Agents of S.H.I.E.L.D. character

- Marvel Cinematic Universe and Marvel Comics character
- Ming-Na Wen as Melinda May in a promotional image for season four
- First appearance: "Pilot"; Agents of S.H.I.E.L.D.; September 24, 2013
- Last appearance: "What We're Fighting For"; Agents of S.H.I.E.L.D.; August 12, 2020
- Created by: Joss Whedon; Jed Whedon; Maurissa Tancharoen
- Portrayed by: Ming-Na Wen; Riley Go (young)

In-universe information
- Full name: Melinda Qiaolian May
- Nickname: The Cavalry
- Occupation: Pilot; S.H.I.E.L.D. agent; Coulson Academy Professor
- Family: Lian May (mother); William May (father)
- Spouse: Andrew Garner (divorced)
- Significant others: Phil Coulson (deceased); Grant Ward (deceased)
- Children: Robin Hinton (adoptive daughter; alternate timeline)
- Nationality: Chinese American

Melinda Qiaolian May, also known as The Cavalry, is a fictional character who first appeared in the Marvel Cinematic Universe, then in Marvel Comics. The character, created by Joss Whedon, Jed Whedon and Maurissa Tancharoen, first appeared in the pilot episode of Agents of S.H.I.E.L.D. in September 2013, and has continually been portrayed by Ming-Na Wen.

== Fictional character biography ==
=== New Agent of S.H.I.E.L.D. ===
Melinda May is brought on to the recently resurrected S.H.I.E.L.D. agent Phil Coulson's team as pilot and field agent, to investigate superhumans and other related phenomena. She is shown to be in a relationship with fellow agent Grant Ward. Coulson tells agent Skye that May, during a mission in Bahrain in 2008, single-handedly took out a superhuman threat and several accomplices, saving a team of S.H.I.E.L.D. agents, though a young girl was killed in the crossfire. Left traumatized by the experience, May withdrew from field duty. Later, her trauma is shown to be gradually healing. She also ends her relationship with Ward. Unknown to Skye and Coulson, May is monitoring their conversation, and reporting to someone else. When the Hydra Uprising begins, May reveals that she knew the truth about Coulson's resurrection (Note: As depicted in the episodes "The Magical Place" and "T.A.H.I.T.I.".) and was monitoring him on director Nick Fury's orders, and Coulson refuses to trust her any more. Feeling unwanted, she leaves, searching to find out the truth behind Coulson's resurrection. She finds the truth and brings it back to Coulson. May later incapacitates Ward, who was a double agent for Hydra, and after Ward's mentor John Garrett's death, goes with the team to the Playground to help restart S.H.I.E.L.D., under the newly promoted director Coulson.

=== Fall of S.H.I.E.L.D. Aftermath ===
May is Coulson's unofficial deputy. She later meets her ex-husband Andrew Garner. When another S.H.I.E.L.D. faction led by Robert Gonzales emerges and occupies their base, May helps Coulson to escape, but later accepts a position on Gonzales' board. It is revealed that in 2008 at Bahrain, the Inhuman Eva Belyakov and some gangsters took a S.H.I.E.L.D. team and several locals hostage, and May entered the building they were using to rescue the hostages. She found them acting out of character, and they attacked her, but she defeated them and killed Eva in a fight, before discovering Eva's daughter Katya was the real threat, having taken control of the hostages to feed on their pain. When Katya killed the Bahrainis she was controlling, May was forced to kill Katya. S.H.I.E.L.D. assumed Eva was the threat and Katya was caught in the crossfire, and May was lauded for saving the S.H.I.E.L.D. team single-handedly and given the nickname 'the Cavalry'. However she became deeply traumatized; her marriage to Garner also suffered, eventually leading to divorce. When the two S.H.I.E.L.D. factions unite, May becomes a member of Coulson's council of advisors. At the end of the season, May takes a break from S.H.I.E.L.D. to be with Garner.

=== Return to S.H.I.E.L.D. ===
May has been on leave from S.H.I.E.L.D. for six months and is looking after her father (William May), who was injured in a car accident. Lance Hunter hopes that May will help him find and kill an absconding Ward, and notes that she suspects that Ward was behind her father's accident, but May is hiding from her life at S.H.I.E.L.D. and difficulties in her relationships with Garner and Coulson. May is eventually convinced by her father that getting back into her S.H.I.E.L.D. life by going with Hunter is the best thing for her, and the two leave to infiltrate the new ranks of Hydra. She later learns that Garner is the Inhuman serial killer Lash. May struggles with this revelation; she continues to work in S.H.I.E.L.D. as the agency attempts to bring down Gideon Malick and later Hive, losing Garner in this battle.

=== STRIKE Trainer and Framework ===
Following the re-legalization of S.H.I.E.L.D. and the appointment of Jeffrey Mace as director, May is given the task of rebuilding and training the new STRIKE team. During one of her missions, she is touched by Lucy Bauer, a woman with ghost-like powers, causing her to become paranoid. Agent Jemma Simmons and S.H.I.E.L.D. ally Holden Radcliffe "cure" May by killing and reviving her. Prior to S.H.I.E.L.D. victory's on Eli Morrow, May was incapacitated and kidnapped by Radcliffe's android Aida and was replaced by an android decoy of herself. After several escape attempts, May's mind is trapped inside the Framework, a virtual reality where she lives as a Hydra agent. With the help of Skye (who now goes by her real name Daisy Johnson) and Simmons, May eventually escapes the Framework, only to face the threat of Aida, now an Inhuman. Following Aida's defeat, May and the others are sent to the year 2091 by an unknown force.

=== Future and Present ===
May and the others find themselves in the Lighthouse, a bunker used to contain the rest of humanity following Earth's destruction. May is captured by the Kree who rule over the station and sent to Earth's surface. There she meets Robin Hinton, who had been raised by May in her past. Discovering the way to return to the present, May and the others return to the Lighthouse and manage to return to the present. They immediately work to prevent the destruction of Earth, come into conflict with General Hale's Hydra, and later with an extraterrestrial force called the Confederacy. Following their victory over a gravitonium-enhanced Glenn Talbot, thus saving Earth, May joins Coulson, who is dying, on his final days on Tahiti.

=== Coulson Look-a-like ===
One year later, May assists in dealing with threats involving Sarge's group and Izel. She like Daisy believes that she can get Coulson back through Sarge, his doppelgänger, but gets mortally stabbed by Sarge and sent to a dimension where Sarge and Izel are trying to free their kind on Earth. May survives as death is meaningless in this dimension, and prevents three of Izel's people from unleashing their kind. After returning to Earth, she kills Izel and collapses from her injuries, while Mack kills Sarge. Simmons arrives and places May in a stasis pod in order to recuperate.

=== Chronicom War ===
May is healed by Enoch, a Chronicom and ally of S.H.I.E.L.D., but she escapes from her stasis pod without his knowledge. Following her recovery, she appears to have no emotions; Elena "Yo-Yo" Rodriguez and Simmons discover that May has lost her own emotions but instead can feel everyone else's whenever she is in proximity of them. After infiltrating the Chronicom ship to save Daisy's sister Kora, May overpowers Sibyl, the leader of the Chronicom hunters, and combines her abilities with Kora's to magnify a beacon of empathy into the Chronicom army, stopping their assault on S.H.I.E.L.D. Following the defeat of Sibyl, a year later, May is a professor at S.H.I.E.L.D.'s Coulson Academy.

== Concept and creation ==
Wen was cast as May in October 2012. Whedon had the character, who was originally listed with the name Agent Althea Rice on casting sheets, "rolling around in his head" for a long time. In preparation for the role, Wen was "given a couple of background stories" about May, but found it challenging to play a character who is respected by those around her when the audience doesn't know why, stating "It's a challenge in different ways....I use some of my own personal experience where we've been scarred or we've been greatly disappointed". When May's past was revealed in "Melinda", Wen called it "devastating", explaining "She was married, she was in love with Andrew, she had a job that she excelled at and loved and believed in—so her world was pretty perfect...To have learned what she had to do, for the good of the many...I can understand why it would traumatize her so much and cause her to retreat." The character is of Chinese descent, like the actress portraying her, although she was not written that way. May's shirt is the same blue as many S.H.I.E.L.D. agents in The Avengers such as Maria Hill, so as to have some continuity between her uniform and those established in the films. The rest of her costume is inspired by military flight suits, including a leather vest, and pants with stretch panels to aid with fighting.

== Characterization ==
Following the series premiere, Wen teased the character, saying that "she's very much the observer, and whenever she wants to put in her two cents, it's something that you want to listen to and kind of pay attention to...She's slow in getting acclimated to part of the group and being in the field again." Talking about May's reasons for staying with S.H.I.E.L.D., Wen explained "May's friendship and...loyalty and her love for Coulson [keeps her there]. Maybe not romantic [love], it's just really—it's hard to describe—it's a bond, it's unbreakable, and she will watch over Coulson and take care of him and help him through whatever he needs to at this point in his life... She wants to be there for him, and if it serves S.H.I.E.L.D., that's just more or less a side effect, really." Wen admitted that May develops a relationship with Skye over the course of the series, going from thinking of Skye as "someone that she didn't want as part of the team and didn't understand why Coulson wanted her" to wanting Skye "to be the best agent that she can be." After discovering that Skye is an Inhuman, Wen stated that "it's like when you have your child or your daughter losing control or getting involved with situations or people that you're not sure about. You don't have the control anymore. It's very frightening. For Skye to be an unknown entity, May still holds out hope. She hopes that her training with her will help her be able to control her new powers, but you never know. Sometimes the power overtakes everything else."

On how May deals with her ex-husband Andrew becoming the Inhuman killer Lash, Wen said, "She's come to the understanding that it was something he had no control over. The betrayal might be not sharing that information of what happened to him with her. I think she understands that, in a way, he was scared and trying to be protective of their relationship and doing it all for the wrong reasons. I think, ultimately, Agent May is kind of shut down when it comes to Lash and Andrew at this point. That's why she's re-focusing all her energy back into S.H.I.E.L.D., back being by Coulson's side. That's where she's most comfortable." Wen went on to describe May as "unconventionally maternal...she's taking care of Simmons and really believing that she needs to be able to protect herself, she's very, very concerned about the family's well being."

== Reception ==
Wen received nominations for 'Favorite Actress in a New TV Series' at the 40th People's Choice Awards and 'Favorite Female TV Star – Family Show' at the 29th Kids' Choice Awards. Wen was also named TVLine's "Performer of the Week" for the week of April 12, 2015, for her performance in "Melinda", specifically her portrayal of May in the flashback sequences.

== Other appearances ==
=== Comics ===
May made her Marvel Comics debut in S.H.I.E.L.D. vol. 3 #1 (Feb. 2015) from Mark Waid and Carlos Pacheco. She joined Phil Coulson's team to regain the Uru Sword, an ancient weapon that belonged to Heimdall. She battled a group of terrorists who were in possession of it and was later debriefed by Maria Hill.

Her next assignment was protecting Wiccan from a man who had special bullets that could harm magic users. With Scarlet Witch's help, the team traveled to Antarctica to find the source and managed to defeat the people who were making the bullets. However, Dormammu took possession of Leo Fitz and shot Scarlet Witch. May had to travel to the Dark Dimension with Coulson and Jeremiah Warrick, a S.H.I.E.L.D. agent with the head of an owl. She fought off an army of Mindless Ones, but was outnumbered. She witnessed Absorbing Man defeat Dormammu afterwards.

May later teamed up with Mockingbird to take out a surgeon who was doing illegal experiments. She and Coulson were later contacted by Silk to aid her, Hulk, Wolverine, and eventually Ghost Rider into fighting an alien creature that was mimicking powers.

=== Web series ===
Melinda May appears in the digital series Agents of S.H.I.E.L.D.: Slingshot with Ming-Na Wen reprising her role.

=== Video games ===
- May is a playable DLC character in Lego Marvel's Avengers.
- May is a supporting character to Agent Coulson's character in Marvel: Future Fight.
- May is a playable character in Marvel Puzzle Quest.

== See also ==
- Characters of the Marvel Cinematic Universe
