= Grant Ward (Marvel Cinematic Universe) =

Agents of S.H.I.E.L.D. character

- Marvel Cinematic Universe and Marvel Comics character
- Brett Dalton as Grant Ward in a promotional image for season three.
- First appearance: "Pilot"; Agents of S.H.I.E.L.D.; September 24, 2013
- Last appearance: "All the Madame's Men"; Agents of S.H.I.E.L.D.; April 25, 2017
- Created by: Joss Whedon; Jed Whedon; Maurissa Tancharoen
- Portrayed by: Brett Dalton; Trenton Rogers (young); Austin Lyon (teenager)

In-universe information
- Full name: Grant Douglas Ward
- Occupation: Solo operative; Wetwork specialist; Double agent
- Affiliation: Inhuman resistance; Hydra; S.H.I.E.L.D.
- Family: Christian Ward (older brother); Thomas Ward (younger brother); Unnamed parents; Unnamed sister
- Significant others: Kara Palamas (deceased); Skye (Framework); Melinda May (formerly)
- Nationality: American

Grant Douglas Ward is a fictional character that originated in the Marvel Cinematic Universe before appearing in Marvel Comics. The character, created by Joss Whedon, Jed Whedon and Maurissa Tancharoen, first appeared in the pilot episode of Agents of S.H.I.E.L.D. in September 2013 through to the fourth season in April 2017, and was continually portrayed by Brett Dalton.

In the show, Grant Ward is introduced as a S.H.I.E.L.D. agent that is newly assigned to the team of the revived Phil Coulson, doing several missions with the team as the audience surrogate. He becomes romantically involved with his teammates Melinda May and Skye. However, towards the middle of season one, he is outed as a double agent of Hydra and a false protagonist, becoming a major antagonist against his former allies in seasons one through three. Although he becomes a situational ally in season two, he embraces himself as the leader of Hydra in the third season. He is killed by Coulson while searching for the Inhuman Hive, but Hive later takes over his body for the second half of season three.

An alternate version of Ward inside the Framework of Holden Radcliffe is a recurring character in the show's fourth season, where he is instead a Hydra agent secretly working for S.H.I.E.L.D.

== Fictional character biography ==
Grant Douglas Ward, the son of politicians, was abused by his parents and older brother Christian growing up. After escaping from military school, stealing a car, and attempting to kill Christian by burning their house down, Grant meets John Garrett, a Hydra double agent within S.H.I.E.L.D. who visits him in juvenile hall. Garrett tells Grant that his parents are pressing charges and Christian is petitioning the court to have him tried as an adult. Garrett trains Grant to be a skilled agent. Later being assigned to Phil Coulson's team, Grant is outed as Hydra when that organization is revealed to the world. After the death of Garrett, Grant becomes a prisoner of S.H.I.E.L.D.

In love with his former teammate Skye, Grant escapes custody, kills Christian and their parents off-screen, and infiltrates Daniel Whitehall's Hydra branch so Skye can meet her father. Despite this, Skye turns on Ward and shoots him, and he escapes only with the help of former S.H.I.E.L.D. agent Kara Palamas (who was brainwashed by Whitehall). Grant develops a romantic relationship with Kara. In an attempt to ambush those who were coming to rescue Bobbi Morse, Grant accidentally kills Palamas while she is in disguise as Melinda May, and blaming S.H.I.E.L.D., decides to take over the now leader-less Hydra.

Joining forces with one of Hydra's previous leaders, Gideon Malick, Ward travels through a portal to an alien planet in search of the ancient Inhuman Hive, but is killed there by Coulson. This allows Hive to use Ward's body as a host.

=== Framework history ===
In the Framework created by Holden Radcliffe, Ward is Skye's boyfriend and fellow Hydra agent. He is revealed to still be a double agent, now working for the Inhuman resistance led by Jeffrey Mace due to his recruitment by Victoria Hand at a young age.

== Concept and creation ==
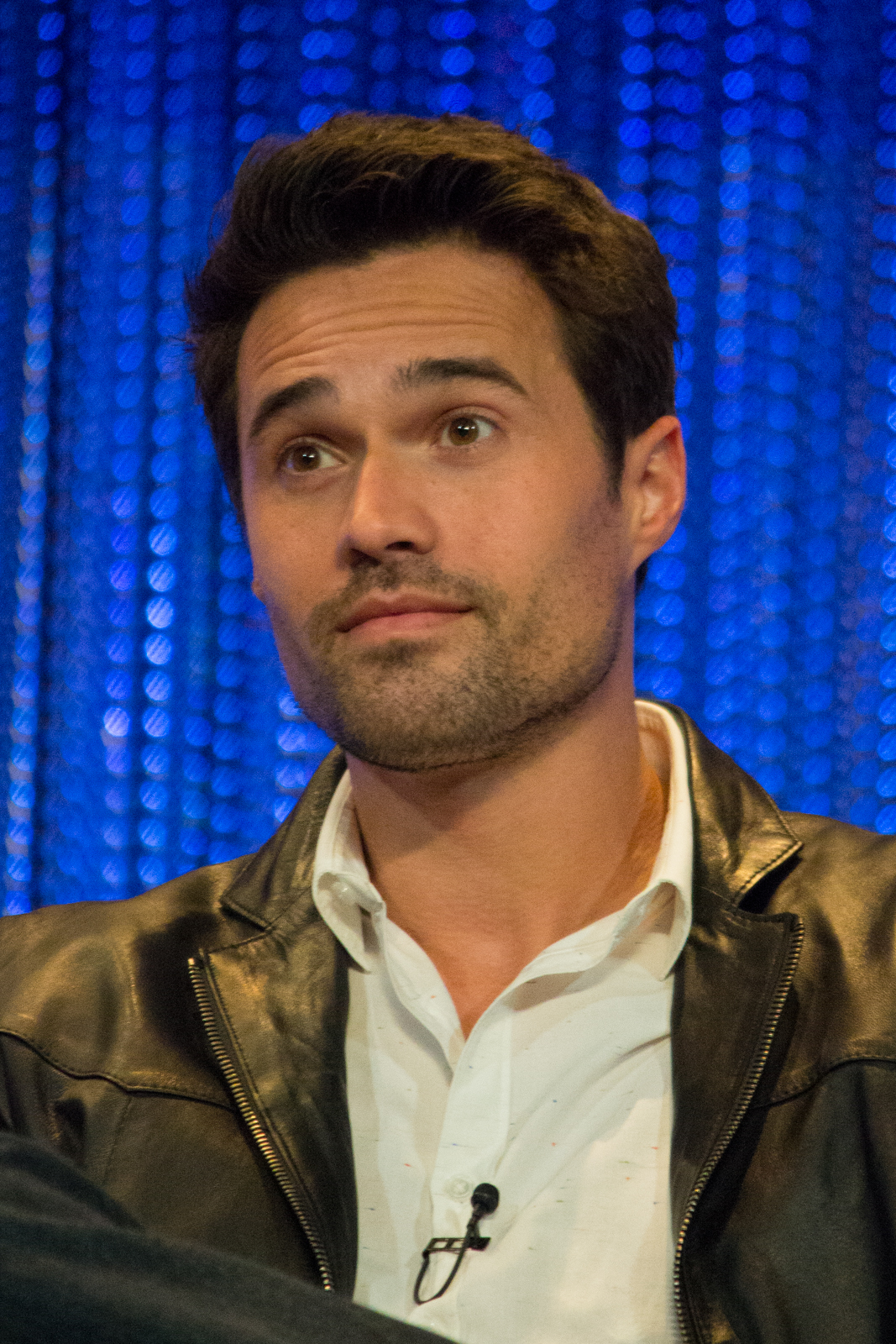
Brett Dalton

Dalton was cast in November 2012. From the conception of the series it was decided that Grant Ward would be a traitor, with executive producer Jed Whedon saying "since [the events of Captain America: The Winter Soldier are] an infiltration based on betrayal on a massive scale, we wanted to have it on the small scale, and have it be a really personal dagger to the heart." Ward's initial costumes were inspired by Jason Bourne and Ethan Hunt, with his look based purely in function and with a muted color palette to reflect his serious attitude. After Ward was outed as Hydra and became a prisoner of S.H.I.E.L.D., Dalton grew a beard for the character, explaining that S.H.I.E.L.D. would not provide a prisoner with a razor, "so it just happens to work out that I have a beard and beards can have a sort of evil connotation." Trenton Rogers and Austin Lyon portray a young Ward.

== Characterization ==
I think what I was given was just a huge opportunity to play somebody who is more complex, more interesting, more dangerous, scarier in a way that Ward wasn't. I get to play two different characters in a way.

— Dalton on being informed of his character's double agent status.

Dalton has described Ward as he first appeared in the series as "a guy who is very trustworthy and rolled up his sleeves and did all the heavy lifting and didn't really question authority. You know, a by-the-book risk assessor". Although it was eventually revealed that Ward was a Hydra imposter, Dalton noted that that doesn't necessarily mean the relationships the character built with his S.H.I.E.L.D. team weren't genuine, since going undercover meant letting his guard down to make the other characters trust him, opening himself up to those relationships despite his ulterior motives.

Following the death of Garrett, the question was asked, "Who is [Grant Ward] without someone telling him what to do?" Dalton answered that "he can follow commands really well. He can do and make tough choices and he can sometimes do unpleasant things in the name of something that he feels he believes in. But...I don't think that Ward knows the answer to that question himself." Dalton called the character a 'wildcard', since he was loyal to Garrett as a father figure rather than Hydra, "and he was more about his teammates rather than the team", later elaborating that "It's not quite good guy, it's not quite bad guy. It's not trying to get in with S.H.I.E.L.D. again, it's not trying to get in with Hydra. He's really on his own path. He's living by his code at this particular point in life." Explaining Ward's relationship with Palamas, Dalton stated

When they first started this relationship, I thought they're two people who have experienced something similar by following orders and then finding themselves not knowing who they are when someone's not telling them what to do....But it really [has] developed into something that's much more complicated than that. There's a teacher-student relationship there as well as what seems like a genuinely romantic relationship. You see us really lovey-dovey in the cockpit and it's making everybody around us sick. In some ways, we have the most healthy relationship out of all of the other dynamics on the show, which is saying something because Ward is not a lovey-dovey kind of guy. That's interesting that he's now in probably the most stable relationship there is.

When Ward accidentally kills Palamas in the season two finale, Dalton said that "This affects him in a way that is deep and lasting. There was a shred of humanity in there, and always the possibility and the thought that he could be redeemed...After Kara's death—that is actually at my hands—after all the time and effort and energy that's been invested in this relationship, it turns him. You see it in his eyes....This whole thing of closure keeps coming up over and over again. There is so much closure out there in the world that needs to be achieved. There's a lot of unfairness that he wants to fix, so we see somebody who is determined, who knows who he is, and is like, 'Fine, if you want to call me the bad guy, I'm the bad guy.'"

Speaking about the monolog Ward gives in "Maveth", Dalton noted that some viewers thought Ward sounded like "a born-again, devout, off-my-rocker person at that point", but Dalton felt that it was "a real moment for Ward where he actually gets a sense of there's something greater than revenge and all of these smaller emotions; there's actually something that's bigger out there that he's a part of." Following Ward's death later in the episode, Bell discussed whether the writers ever considered redeeming the character, saying, "No character is too high to fall or too low to be redeemed, theoretically....but for someone to be redeemed, they need to ask forgiveness, or want to be redeemed....[Ward] never felt like he needed to apologize for what he did." Dalton returned to the series in the fourth season to portray Ward in the Framework. Dalton felt returning to the character in this capacity allowed him to "finally get to have the hero arc that he believed Grant Ward deserves."

== Reception ==
Dalton won for 'Male Breakout Star' at the 2014 Teen Choice Awards. The character of Grant Ward garnered a fan following, with a group known as the "Ward Warriors" often using the hashtag "StandWithWard" on social media. Dalton was surprised that people "seem to be standing with Ward no matter what he does....there are people out there who just seem to be following this character wherever he goes. I think that's brilliant....There isn't any character like him on the show, and I would say even within the Marvel canon." As a "shoutout" to these fans, Palamas says, "I will always stand with Ward" in the second-season finale, which Dalton called "a testament to the fans, this incredibly loyal fanbase that has now influenced the script of our show." He was also nominated for Choice TV: Villain at the 2016 Teen Choice Awards.

== Other appearances ==
=== Comics ===
Grant Ward made his comic book debut in All-New, All-Different Marvel Point One #1 (December 2015), created by Marc Guggenheim and German Peralta. He is seen working closely with Phil Coulson on infiltrating Gorgon's Hydra. He manages to pass himself off as a Hydra supporter after protecting Gorgon from one of Iron Man's repulsor blasts. However, Ward ends up genuinely joining Hydra and shoots Maria Hill, but Hill had caught on and replaced herself with a Life Model Decoy.

He next showed up stealing a Quantum Drive, which was eventually bought by John Walker and returned to S.H.I.E.L.D. Out of desperation, he kidnaps Coulson and his telepathic girlfriend Lola Daniels and forces her to read Coulson's mind. He uses the information to give Hydra the plans to create armored suits. Ward and Coulson later fight, with Ward killing Lola, but Coulson apprehends him.

When Elektra rejoins S.H.I.E.L.D., she brings Ward back onto the team. However, she places a collar with an explosive device on him to ensure his loyalty.

Another version of Grant Ward briefly appears during the "Secret Wars" storyline. He is a low-ranking member of Hydra residing in the Battleworld domain of the Hydra Empire and does not appear to be related to or associated with the more familiar Grant Ward.

=== Video games ===
Grant Ward is a playable DLC character in Lego Marvel's Avengers.

== See also ==
- Characters of the Marvel Cinematic Universe
