= Phil Coulson =

Fictional character from the Marvel Cinematic Universe

- Marvel Cinematic Universe character
- Clark Gregg as Phil Coulson in the television series Agents of S.H.I.E.L.D.
- First appearance: Iron Man (2008)
- Last appearance: "What If... Howard the Duck Got Hitched?"; What If...?; (2024)
- Created by: Mark Fergus; Hawk Ostby; Art Marcum; Matt Holloway
- Portrayed by: Clark Gregg

In-universe information
- Full name: Phillip J. Coulson
- Species: Human; Life Model Decoy
- Title: Ghost Rider
- Occupation: S.H.I.E.L.D. agent; S.H.I.E.L.D. director
- Affiliation: S.H.I.E.L.D.
- Significant others: Audrey Nathan; Rosalind Price; Melinda May
- Nationality: American

Agent Phillip J. Coulson (/ˈkoʊlsən/ KOHL-sən) is a fictional character portrayed and voiced by Clark Gregg in the Marvel Cinematic Universe (MCU) media franchise. Coulson is depicted as a high-ranking member of the espionage agency S.H.I.E.L.D. and longtime partner of Nick Fury.

During an attack on a S.H.I.E.L.D helicarrier, Coulson is stabbed through the heart by Loki and the Avengers form to avenge his death. Fury later has Coulson resurrected with Kree blood to continue serving S.H.I.E.L.D., putting together a small team of agents supervised by Melinda May and coming to view one agent, Daisy Johnson, as a surrogate daughter. After rebuilding S.H.I.E.L.D. following its infiltration and destruction by Hydra, saving the planet, and making a deal with a demon to briefly become Ghost Rider, Coulson retires to Tahiti with May, where he dies once again.

Following the destruction of Sarge, a biological duplicate of Coulson created by the monoliths and inhabited by the Inca god Pachakutiq, a Life Model Decoy (LMD) of Coulson is made from a copy of his consciousness saved to a virtual reality, and Sarge's and May's genetic memories, resurrecting him again. After preventing an alternate timeline from being conquered by Chronicoms, Coulson decides to travel the world in his flying car, Lola.

Coulson was a central figure in the "Infinity Saga", appearing in five films, two television series, one digital series, and two Marvel One-Shots, most notably in The Avengers (2012) and Agents of S.H.I.E.L.D. (2013–2020). Several versions of Coulson from within the MCU multiverse also appear, notably in Agents of S.H.I.E.L.D. and the animated series What If...? (2021), with Gregg reprising the role.

Coulson has additionally appeared in several forms of non-MCU media, being integrated into the mainstream Marvel Universe, initially modelled after Gregg and depicted as a S.H.I.E.L.D. agent and supporting character of Deadpool, before being redeveloped as a supervillain servant of the demon Mephisto and commander of the Squadron Supreme of America following his death and resurrection, and the main antagonist of "Heroes Reborn".

== Marvel Cinematic Universe ==
=== Early life at S.H.I.E.L.D. ===
Phillip Coulson was born to Robert and Julie Coulson, and grew up idolizing World War II heroes Captain America and Agent Peggy Carter. He joins the intelligence agency that Carter founded, S.H.I.E.L.D., working under Nick Fury and alongside fellow agents John Garrett and Melinda May.

In 1995, Coulson accompanies Fury to investigate a woman who destroyed a Blockbuster Video store. While they investigate inside the store, a shape-shifting Skrull imitates Coulson and falls victim to Fury when the real Coulson calls him wondering where everyone went. Coulson later accompanies Fury and the woman to S.H.I.E.L.D., but, trusting Fury, allows them to escape. He later debriefs with Fury, who goes on to form the Avengers Initiative in response to his escapade.

Sometime after, Coulson is put in charge of Project T.A.H.I.T.I., designed to revive a fallen Avenger with the blood of a decaying blue alien. He shuts the project down after its participants begin going mad and carving mysterious symbols.

=== Forming the Avengers and first death ===
In 2008, Coulson debriefs Tony Stark on his captivity in Afghanistan. He is also one of several agents who accompany Pepper Potts in an attempt to arrest Obadiah Stane once his criminal activities are revealed. He later acts as the S.H.I.E.L.D. representative at Stark's press conference where Stark announces himself as Iron Man.

In 2010, Coulson is put in charge of supervising a drunken Stark, before being informed by Fury of an unidentified item found in New Mexico. He travels to the desert and finds a hammer. He then seizes Jane Foster's equipment to study the hammer, and later meets Thor, who claims to own the hammer despite not being able to pick it up. After Thor uses the hammer to destroy the Destroyer, an automaton, Coulson befriends him and agrees to give Foster back her equipment.

Sometime later, Coulson and Jasper Sitwell attempt to stop the World Security Council from gaining access to the Abomination, sending Stark to annoy General Ross who held the Abomination in custody. Coulson also assists in reviving Steve Rogers after his body is found preserved in ice, 70 years after his presumed death.

In 2012, Thor's brother Loki wages war against S.H.I.E.L.D., with Fury assembling his team of Avengers. Coulson recruits Natasha Romanoff and Stark, and meets Rogers, his idol. Loki is later captured by the Avengers, but escapes after a brainwashed Clint Barton frees him, almost destroying S.H.I.E.L.D.'s Helicarrier in the process. During Loki's escape, Coulson threatens him with a gun (made from the body of the Destroyer), being fatally stabbed by Loki's scepter. Coulson's death unites the Avengers, which inspires them to defeat Loki and his army of Chitauri.

=== Resurrection through Project T.A.H.I.T.I. ===
After Coulson's death, Fury uses the disbanded Project T.A.H.I.T.I. to resurrect him. Coulson's brain is altered, being led to believe he was sent to Tahiti for rehabilitation. Following his resurrection, Coulson puts together a team of agents to travel the world and deal with strange missions. This team included Melinda May, Daisy Johnson, Grant Ward, Leo Fitz and Jemma Simmons.

During this time, Coulson becomes aware of Project T.A.H.I.T.I., finding out that he was revived using GH-325, a drug derived from an ancient Kree corpse that Peggy Carter previously recovered. Later, the terrorist organisation Hydra is revealed to have infiltrated S.H.I.E.L.D., leading to its demise and the murder of Fury. After Ward and John Garrett are revealed as Hydra agents, Coulson and his team work to stop them, eventually defeating them with the help of Fury, who had faked his death. Fury makes Coulson the new director of S.H.I.E.L.D. and tasks him with rebuilding the agency.

=== Director of S.H.I.E.L.D. and second death ===
Coulson's involvement with alien materials leads to a faction of S.H.I.E.L.D. agents led by Robert Gonzalez, who distrust secrets and superhumans attempting to take over the fledgling organization, but Coulson convinces them to let him stay on as director after helping save hundreds of civilians. Together, they defeat a faction of Inhumans, though Coulson loses a hand in the process. Coulson later becomes romantically involved with Rosalind Price, the leader of an anti-Inhuman government task-force called the Advanced Threat Containment Unit (ATCU), until her death at the hands of Grant Ward, a Hydra agent who formerly worked with Coulson. Coulson gets revenge by crushing Ward's chest with his prosthetic hand.

Following the signing of the Sokovia Accords, S.H.I.E.L.D. is re-legitimized, with Coulson replaced as director by Jeffrey Mace, though he is eventually able to retake command of operations while Mace serves as the public face of S.H.I.E.L.D. After the artificial intelligence AIDA attempts to take over the world, Coulson allows himself to briefly become a Ghost Rider to defeat her (AIDA was too quick to allow the original Rider to get up close so the only option was to take her by surprise). Coulson and his teammates are later abducted and sent to the future, to prevent the extinction of humanity. After their return, his team discover the Ghost Rider burned through the GH-325 that kept Coulson alive, causing him to slowly die ever since. Despite the team's best efforts to save him, Coulson ultimately chooses to leave S.H.I.E.L.D. and live the remainder of his life in Tahiti with Melinda May, with whom he developed a romantic relationship.

==== Sarge ====
As the team, especially May and new Director Alphonso Mackenzie, mourn Coulson, they are perturbed by the arrival of the cold-blooded Sarge, an alien who is physically and genetically identical to Coulson. They later learn Sarge's body was created in an accident involving three reality-altering Monoliths, and was inhabited by the entity Pachakutiq thousands of years ago, losing both its and Coulson's memories before becoming Sarge. Mack and Johnson kill Pachakutiq to avert the end of the world, but the team is forced to escape an attack by the cybernetic alien Chronicoms. To combat them, S.H.I.E.L.D. scientists Leo Fitz and Jemma Simmons make an enhanced Life Model Decoy of Coulson to guide them in a journey through S.H.I.E.L.D.'s past, beginning in the 1930s.

==== Revived as an L.M.D. ====
The L.M.D. Coulson helps the team stop the Chronicoms from changing history while coping with his existence as a non-human entity. A year after the Chronicoms' defeat, Coulson takes a sabbatical to travel the world in a reconstruction of his red 1962 Chevrolet Corvette, Lola.

== Alternate versions ==
=== Radcliffe LMDs ===
After being corrupted by the Darkhold, Holden Radcliffe and Aida build Life Model Decoys of Coulson and other S.H.I.E.L.D. agents who are programmed to impersonate their real counterparts and steal the Darkhold for themselves. After being betrayed by the L.M.D. May, Radcliffe's Coulson L.M.D. is destroyed when the L.M.D. May blows up the empty S.H.I.E.L.D. base to allow its remaining human agents to escape.

=== History teacher ===
After revealed to be trapped in the Darkhold-infused Framework virtual reality at the end of "Self Control", Coulson experiences a parallel lifetime in which he never joined S.H.I.E.L.D. and became a history teacher and conspiracy theorist who believes Hydra is using mind control soap to enslave the population of Earth. After being made aware of his alternate life as a S.H.I.E.L.D. agent by Johnson, Coulson assists her ensuring his escape from the Framework; upon awakening in the real world, the real Coulson is surprised that he remembers the life of his Framework self.

=== Destruction of Earth ===
In an alternate 2018, after failing to stop a gravitonium-infused Glenn Talbot from accidentally destroying the Earth, Coulson and his team rescue a fraction of the Earth's population aboard their Lighthouse base, built to withstand the Earth's destruction, before eventually dying as a result of his deal with Ghost Rider.

=== What If...? ===
Alternate universe variants of Coulson appear in the animated series What If...? (2021–2024), with Gregg reprising his role.

==== Death of the Avengers ====
In an alternate 2011, Coulson witnesses the murders of five candidates of the Avengers Initiative, and investigates the mastermind behind their deaths with Nick Fury. Fury and Loki discover that Hank Pym was responsible.

==== Thor's party and chasing the Ducks ====
In another alternate 2011, Coulson assists Maria Hill, acting director of S.H.I.E.L.D., in attempting to stop an out-of-control party hosted by Thor. He later assists Fury in retrieving Howard the Duck and Darcy Lewis' child, who is said to be destined for a greater purpose.

== Marvel Comics ==
Phil Coulson
- Phil Coulson as depicted on the variant cover of Infinity Watch #4 (April 2025). Art by In-Hyuk Lee.

Publication information
- Publisher: Marvel Comics
- First appearance: Battle Scars #6 (April 2012)
- Created by: Christopher Yost; Matt Fraction; Cullen Bunn

In-story information
- Full name: Phillip J. Coulson
- Team affiliations: 75th Ranger Regiment; Squadron Supreme of America; S.H.I.E.L.D.; Secret Avengers; Power Elite
- Partnerships: Mephisto; Deadpool; Nick Fury Jr.
- Notable aliases: Cheese; President of the United States

=== Battle Scars ===
Phil Coulson first appeared in the mainstream Marvel Universe in Christopher Yost, Matt Fraction and Cullen Bunn's Battle Scars #6 (April 2012) as Nick Fury Jr.'s Ranger teammate nicknamed "Cheese". He is later revealed to be Coulson after he follows Fury in joining S.H.I.E.L.D. Coulson has gone on to appear in other comics set in the mainstream Marvel universe, including Secret Avengers by Nick Spencer and Luke Ross in 2013, and in Thor: God of Thunder in 2014.

=== S.H.I.E.L.D. vol. 3 ===
In July 2014 at San Diego Comic-Con, Marvel Comics announced an ongoing series titled S.H.I.E.L.D., to be set in the mainstream Marvel Universe, and written by Mark Waid, beginning December 2014. The series is led by Coulson, and sees the canonical introduction of characters that originated from Agents of S.H.I.E.L.D, to which Waid said, "This is our chance to introduce a lot of the other characters into the Marvel Universe, and give them the Marvel Universe spin." Waid described the series as "done-in-one. Coulson and his team have a mission, and if we need someone for a mission, everyone in the Marvel Universe is available as a potential Agent." In this series, Coulson is the Supreme Commander of Special Operations for S.H.I.E.L.D. under Maria Hill.

=== Deadpool vol. 6 ===
He has appeared in Deadpool, assisting S.H.I.E.L.D. agent Preston and paying Deadpool for his earlier services to S.H.I.E.L.D. During the Secret Empire event, Coulson discovers that Captain America, who had been replaced by an alternate version that was a Hydra Sleeper Agent, was involved with a Chitauri invasion of Earth. To silence him, Rodgers orders Deadpool to kill him.

=== Avengers vol. 8 ===
Phil Coulson later turned up alive and appears as a member of the Power Elite where he meets with Thunderbolt Ross to talk about the Avengers going global. Coulson states to Ross that he has put together the Squadron Supreme of America to be the sanctioned superheroes of the United States, now expressing an intense hatred for "heroes" such as Captain America and Deadpool.

The Squadron Supreme of America are revealed to be simulacrums created by Mephisto and programmed by the Power Elite so that Coulson can have them be a United States-sponsored superhero team, Coulson having gone to Hell after his death for unspecified war crimes, and made a deal with Mephisto to be restored to life. During the War of the Realms storyline, Coulson summons the Squadron Supreme of America to fight the invading Frost Giants. After the Squadron Supreme caused the Frost Giants to retreat, Coulson sends them to Ohio which has become a battleground.

At The Pentagon, Phil Coulson is briefed about an intruder on Sublevel 7 by a Nick Fury L.M.D. when it turns out to be Black Panther. The Squadron Supreme are summoned to confront Black Panther. Hyperion states that the Squadron Supreme are the United States' sanctioned superhero team in light of the Avengers becoming an anti-American team. As Nighthawk states to Blur that Black Panther will not run as he is under arrest, Black Panther states to them that he does not know how they got their powers and that they are not the Squadron Supreme, as he even asked if they trust Coulson. Before they can grab him, Black Panther contacts Broo to teleport him away. As he disappears, Black Panther states that Coulson will not answer their questions and that the Avengers are not their enemies unless they force them to be.

=== Heroes Reborn ===
In "Heroes Reborn", Coulson uses the Pandemonium Cube to rewrite reality in Mephisto's name, erasing the Avengers from existence and making himself President. He is later defeated and imprisoned in the Pandemonium Cube. Coulson is later resurrected by the Death Stone and becomes its wielder.

== Concept and creation ==
Agent Coulson was one of the guys who wasn't really in the comic books, and he [had] a very kind of small role in Iron Man. And I was just very lucky that they chose to expand that character and chose to put him more into the universe of it.

— Gregg on the character's expansion in Thor

Agent Phil Coulson was created by Mark Fergus, Hawk Ostby, Art Marcum and Matt Holloway for Iron Man, the first feature film in the MCU. Coulson was the first S.H.I.E.L.D. agent introduced in the MCU, and was portrayed by Clark Gregg, who was offered a three-picture deal. Gregg initially balked at this due to the character initially only being known as "Agent" and having few lines, but recognized Marvel's plan for an interconnected universe; the character was ultimately given the surname "Coulson" after Danny Coulson, whose book No Heroes: Inside the FBI's Secret Counter-Terror Force was used as a dialogue reference for Iron Man. Gregg went on to play the character in Iron Man 2, Thor, and The Avengers, the latter film in which he was provided the first name "Phil".

Throughout the films, Coulson is generally depicted as a supporting character of the protagonists and used to represent S.H.I.E.L.D.'s presence, to the point that Gregg has described Coulson as "the S.H.I.E.L.D. agent". However, for the Marvel One-Shot short films The Consultant and A Funny Thing Happened on the Way to Thor's Hammer, Coulson is given "a chance to stand in his own spotlight for once". This was a "natural" move for co-producer Brad Winderbaum, who wanted to "paint a picture of S.H.I.E.L.D. pulling the strings and being responsible for some of the events we've seen in the films. What better character to represent this idea than Agent Coulson, the first S.H.I.E.L.D. agent we were introduced to?"

At the 2012 New York Comic Con, Joss Whedon and Kevin Feige announced that Gregg would be starring as Coulson in Agents of S.H.I.E.L.D., despite the character dying in The Avengers, with Whedon saying "He's headlining the S.H.I.E.L.D. show and always was." Gregg said of Whedon's explanation for Coulson's resurrection, "I found it so fascinating and so true to the world of the comics and mythology in general as I understand them that I was immediately in." Regarding the amount of creative input he has over the character in the series, Gregg said, "I have meetings with [the showrunners] once or twice a year and talk about what the big ideas are ... They're really responsive to the fact that I've been involved with this person four, five years longer than them, but ... I have no complaints with what they're doing."

Agents of S.H.I.E.L.D. costume designer Ann Foley described Coulson as a "company man", wearing suits in "the S.H.I.E.L.D. palette—grey, black and navy with a distinct but subtle pattern." Foley did note "subtle changes" in Coulson's costuming in the series from the films, such as streamlined suits and "more slick" ties, "now that [he] is back after being 'killed' by Loki". After Coulson's hand is cut off in the second-season finale, which was realized by having a mechanical axe cut through a "faux arm made of tripe wrapped around a chicken thigh", Gregg described it as "heavy ... one of those things where you're having the practical difficulty your character does. People were handing me stuff, like files, and I couldn't really open them without using my nose." This practicality issue continued with the prosthetic hand Coulson subsequently has to use, with Gregg saying "the reality informs the thing. It's really hard to figure out how to use this prosthetic, and that's what Phil Coulson's going through ... I'm hoping it evolves at some point." Gregg also noted that in the third season Coulson would be wearing more casual clothes, partly because "he can't even seem to tie a tie" with his new hand. The prosthetic hand evolves throughout the season, with a later iteration projecting an energy shield, inspired by a similar one used in the comics by Captain America. The energy shield was created by Cosa, one of the series' visual effects vendors.

There had been considerations for Coulson to return in Iron Man 3 and Thor: The Dark World, but the character was not slated to appear in any more films. Whedon asserts, "As far as the fiction of the movies, Coulson is dead," elaborating that "generally [he feels] like the S.H.I.E.L.D. audience and The Avengers audiences are not actually the same group, necessarily," and so the films would have to explain Coulson's resurrection again for the film-only audience if he were to be reintroduced. Gregg reprises the role once again in Captain Marvel (2019), as the film is set in the 1990s. Gregg was digitally de-aged by 25 years, along with co-star Samuel L. Jackson, the first time Marvel had done this for an entire film. In regards to the character's resurrection within the MCU canon, however, Loki head writer Michael Waldron suggested in one interview that Agents of S.H.I.E.L.D. might take place in "one other tendril of the multiverse, perhaps", a timeline parallel to the MCU's canon timeline.

=== Characterization ===
Gregg has stated, "I think of Agent Coulson, after all these years, as a guy with a full life. I think every day he's somewhere doing something for S.H.I.E.L.D., and yet I don't always know what that is... There's always a different twist. In this one he gets to show more of his wisecracking wit, and in this one he's a little bit more of a badass." Despite Coulson being called "the most recognizable face in the Marvel Comics movie universe", he is depicted as an "everyman" in a universe full of superheroes—"the glue that binds" the characters together. Gregg explained his portrayal of the character as "just a guy grumbling about his job ... he's tasked with handling these kind of diva superheroes, you know? 'Oh, really, Asgard? Dude, just get in the car.'"

By being so front and center in Marvel's Agents of S.H.I.E.L.D. in a way that he wasn't as much in the films ... he's gotten some power. He's at the front lines, and what is the cost of that going to be?

— Gregg, on how starring in the television series can affect Coulson differently to appearing in the films.

On whether the resurrected Coulson would be the same as before he died, Gregg said "I don't know how you could not change going through what he went through. I think if he hadn't gone through some kind of change, it wouldn't be any good. That said, I don't know if he understands how much he's changed." Later exploring some of those changes, Gregg stated "In some ways, he kinda finds himself not nearly as cold or ruthless as he would like to be, or as he has been. And at the same time, putting together this team, he feels driven by motives inside of himself that he can't quite always make sense of and that feels very new to him."

After Coulson was promoted to Director of S.H.I.E.L.D., Gregg said "He kind of got his dream job that I don't even think he would have ever dreamed he would be given ... he's got a little bit more of an idealistic, big hearted side of him [than Nick Fury does], some of which is going to be extinguished by the hard decisions he has to make." Speaking about the evolving nature of Coulson's relationship with his team, Gregg said "There's a way he can afford an intimacy with all of them when they're part of a small, elite squad on the Bus. It's different than what's possible for him as Director of S.H.I.E.L.D." Discussing Coulson's character progression through three seasons in relation to him killing Ward on the alien planet, executive producer Jeffrey Bell said, "First season Coulson would have beat Ward up and then thrown him over his shoulder and brought him back to Earth and locked him away. Season two Coulson would have defeated him and left him there on the other planet to fend for himself," while season three Coulson paused while the portal to Earth was already closing to take the time to kill Ward.

For the fourth season, Coulson is demoted back to field agent status. Gregg said that the reasoning for this "makes sense given that S.H.I.E.L.D. is coming out of the shadows. There are people that will want their person in charge." He felt that Coulson would actually prefer this, saying, "I always felt like Coulson was happiest in the field. Neither I nor Coulson loved playing and listening while his agents went into dangerous situations. And there are more dramatic possibilities when you have a boss that you have to deal with."

== Reception ==
In his review for Agents of S.H.I.E.L.D.'s first season, Evan Valentine at Collider named Clark Gregg as one of the high points of the series, noting that the actor was "one positive I consistently point out in each and every episode". Valentine stated that "What made us fall in love with the character from the first Iron Man to his death in The Avengers is still alive and kicking. Coulson was able to throw out quips like none other, while also turning on a dime, and expressing serious rage in moments ... Gregg raises the S.H.I.E.L.D. banner high". Reviewing the episode "The Writing on the Wall", which concluded the majority of Coulson's storyline in the series up to that point, Kevin Fitzpatrick of ScreenCrush praised how Coulson had become "unglued" throughout the series, which had "pushed the newly-minted director into some dark places". Eric Goldman, reviewing for IGN, was also positive of the "unhinged version of Coulson", as well as the more serious leadership role the character took on for the second season, with Goldman finding Coulson's decision in "Making Friends and Influencing People" that Donnie Gill "either went with them or had to be taken out" to be especially notable.

Clark Gregg won for Best Supporting Actor in The Avengers at the 39th Saturn Awards.

== In other media ==
=== Television ===
- Phil Coulson appears in Ultimate Spider-Man, voiced by Clark Gregg. This version is the principal of Peter Parker's school.
- Phil Coulson makes a cameo appearance in the Marvel Disk Wars: The Avengers episode "The Mightiest of Heroes!".

=== Comic books ===
==== The Avengers: Earth's Mightiest Heroes ====
Phil Coulson appears in the comic book continuation of The Avengers: Earth's Mightiest Heroes.

==== Ultimate Marvel ====
In 2014, the Ultimate version of Phil Coulson debuted in the Ultimate Fantastic Four series as an ex-Agent of S.H.I.E.L.D. turned Director of the Future Foundation.

==== Marvel 1602 ====
In November 2015, a 17th-century version of Coulson (Master Coulson) appeared in the series 1602: Witch Hunter Angela.

==== Spidey ====
Phil Coulson appears in the Spidey comic book.

=== Video games ===
- Phil Coulson appears as a playable character in Marvel Super Hero Squad Online, voiced by Tom Kenny.
- Phil Coulson appears as a non-player character in Marvel Heroes, with Clark Gregg reprising the role.
- Phil Coulson appears as a non-player character in Marvel: Avengers Alliance, Alliance 2, and Alliance Tactics.
- Phil Coulson appears as a voiceover guide and hint-giver, as well as an unlockable playable character in Lego Marvel Super Heroes, voiced again by Clark Gregg.
- Phil Coulson appears as a playable character in Marvel: Future Fight.
- Phil Coulson appears in Lego Marvel's Avengers, voiced again by Clark Gregg.
- Phil Coulson appears as a playable character in Marvel Avengers Academy, voiced by Billy Kametz.
- Phil Coulson appears as a playable character in Lego Marvel Super Heroes 2.
- Phil Coulson appears as a playable character in Marvel Puzzle Quest.
- Phil Coulson appears as a playable character in Marvel Strike Force.

== See also ==
- Characters of the Marvel Cinematic Universe
