= Daisy Johnson (Marvel Cinematic Universe) =

Superheroine portrayed by Chloe Bennet

- Marvel Cinematic Universe character
- Chloe Bennet as Daisy Johnson in a promotional still for Agents of S.H.I.E.L.D. season 3
- First appearance: "Pilot"; Agents of S.H.I.E.L.D.; (2013)
- Last appearance: "What We're Fighting For"; Agents of S.H.I.E.L.D.; (2020)
- Based on: Daisy Johnson by: Brian Michael Bendis; Gabriele Dell'Otto
- Adapted by: Joss Whedon; Jed Whedon; Maurissa Tancharoen
- Portrayed by: Chloe Bennet

In-universe information
- Aliases: Skye; Quake; Destroyer of worlds
- Species: Inhuman
- Titles: S.H.I.E.L.D. agent; Acting Director of S.H.I.E.L.D.
- Affiliation: S.H.I.E.L.D.; Hydra (Framework)
- Family: Calvin Johnson (father); Jiaying (mother, deceased); Kora (sister, deceased) (original timeline); Kora (sister) (alternate timeline)
- Significant others: Daniel Sousa; Grant Ward (Framework); Lincoln Campbell (deceased); Miles Lydon (formerly)

Daisy Johnson is a superheroine portrayed by Chloe Bennet appearing in the Marvel Cinematic Universe multimedia franchise. Based on the namesake character from Marvel Comics and adapted for television by Joss Whedon, Jed Whedon, and Maurissa Tancharoen, the character first appeared in the 2013 pilot episode of Agents of S.H.I.E.L.D. and went on to become a prominent character throughout the series.

Johnson is initially introduced as a computer hacker known as "Skye"; the character's real name of Daisy Johnson is revealed over the course of the second season, with the character being known as such for the rest of the series. The character evolves throughout her appearances from a hacker to a S.H.I.E.L.D. agent and ultimately an Inhuman superhero known to the public as Quake in the fourth season. Aspects of this interpretation were later integrated into the comics version of the character.

== Fictional character biography ==
Daisy Johnson was born in China to Calvin Johnson and his Inhuman wife Jiaying, but was soon taken by Hydra agents which infiltrated S.H.I.E.L.D. and raised as an orphan by nuns. Taking the name "Skye" since she disliked the name the orphanage gave her, she became a skilled hacktivist, opposing organizations like S.H.I.E.L.D.

Being a hacker led to Skye's involvement with Coulson, who decided to recruit her, and have Ward, and then May, train her to be a formidable field agent. Ward unfortunately turns out to be a Hydra mole, devastating and enraging Skye, who had harbored romantic feelings for him prior to realizing his true colors. After reuniting with her father, Skye chooses to drive him away, knowing him to be a monster and murderer, though his wishes for her to fulfill her destiny—by unlocking her Inhuman abilities—are granted when she unintentionally comes into contact with the Terrigen Mists, which give her earthquake-generating abilities. Skye soon meets Jiaying, who helps Skye control her abilities. Skye's loyalties are tested when Jiaying attempts to start a war with S.H.I.E.L.D., and she ultimately sides with S.H.I.E.L.D. Now using her birth name, Johnson forms a S.H.I.E.L.D. team of Inhumans named the Secret Warriors, including Elena "Yo-Yo" Rodriguez, Lincoln Campbell, and Joey Gutierrez.

After briefly being connected to Hive, and watching Lincoln Campbell, with whom she developed a romantic relationship, sacrifice himself for her, Johnson leaves S.H.I.E.L.D. and becomes known as the powered vigilante "Quake" to the public. She later returns to S.H.I.E.L.D. following the fight with Eli Morrow in the fourth season of the series. While traveling through time to stop the Chronicoms from changing history in season seven, she enters into a relationship with time-displaced Agent Daniel Sousa and discovers she had an older half-sister, Kora, who had died in her timeline. After helping an earlier timeline version of Kora join the team, Daisy continues to work with her and Sousa one year after defeating the Chronicoms.

== Concept and creation ==
Daisy Johnson was created by Brian Michael Bendis and Gabriele Dell'Otto for Secret War No. 2. When the character of Skye was introduced to Agents of S.H.I.E.L.D., it was always intended that she would be the MCU version of Johnson, as executive producer Maurissa Tancharoen explained, "there are always the series of clearances, but we always knew we wanted to evolve Skye into something else. Daisy Johnson was the main character that we wanted to go for. We got confirmation on that very early on, so we've been on that track ever since." Bennet was cast as Skye in December 2012, out of more than 400 actresses who auditioned for the role. Unlike the comic version, Skye is an Inhuman; Jed Whedon explained that "We've created a different origin for her...we merged those two ideas together also because there are such rabid fans out there that if we stick to original story points from the comics, they will smell story points from miles away. Those two factors led us to coming up with a different notion of how she got her powers."

Skye's initial costume design was intended to keep her relatable, with inspiration coming from street style blogs, but as she became a more experienced S.H.I.E.L.D. agent in the second season, she received a more tactical outfit. For the third season, Bennet cut her hair to further her character's transformation to Daisy Johnson, as she is portrayed in the comics, though she did not cut her hair as short as her comic counterpart; Bennet explained that "the comic book version of Daisy Johnson has very short, Miley Cyrus-esque hair. We wanted to stay true to the comic book character fans love; I wanted to please them but also make sure there was still some movement and length and sexiness in the hair." Bennet also received a superhero costume for the third season, again bringing the character closer to the version in the comics. Foley felt that "one of the most important things was that the symbol be incorporated into her costume but especially onto the gauntlets, And it's also on the back of her suit, which was a fun little touch that we added. As far as the silhouette, we wanted to stay true to the comics and pay tribute to those original designs. I also wanted to incorporate the gold color that I've seen in some of the illustrations of her suit throughout the comics, which is why we have the gold lines that we see on the suit. Finally, for me personally, I wanted a nod to her tactical look from last season, so if you look at the style lines around the top of the costume, you will see that they're similar to her tactical hood from Season 2." The suit was "made out of printed EuroJersey, which works well for these costumes because it's a four-way stretch that gives Chloe the ability to move and do her stunts... But there is a lot more leather in her suit than in some of the others." Legacy Effects created Johnson's iconic gauntlets from the comics, making them "out of flexible materials painted to look like metal" so as not to injure anyone during stunts. During a single-shot fight sequence in "The Dirty Half Dozen", Bennet broke her arm and finished the second season without wearing a cast.

== Characterization ==
Bennet, talking about Skye's commitment to S.H.I.E.L.D., stated that "I think at the beginning she came into S.H.I.E.L.D. thinking it was this government-run, CIA-type thing, where they're not for the people and their motives were not good ones. But throughout the [first] season, being on the team and seeing what was happening, she really got to know why S.H.I.E.L.D. is there. It really is to protect people, and the intention behind the organization is pure....I think she finds a parallel between S.H.I.E.L.D. and Coulson, and I think that's why she's committed to it so deeply." Elaborating on this, Bennet said "she's always had this unspoken bond with Coulson that's a very father/daughter relationship where clearly the love they have for each other is evident in a very caring way."

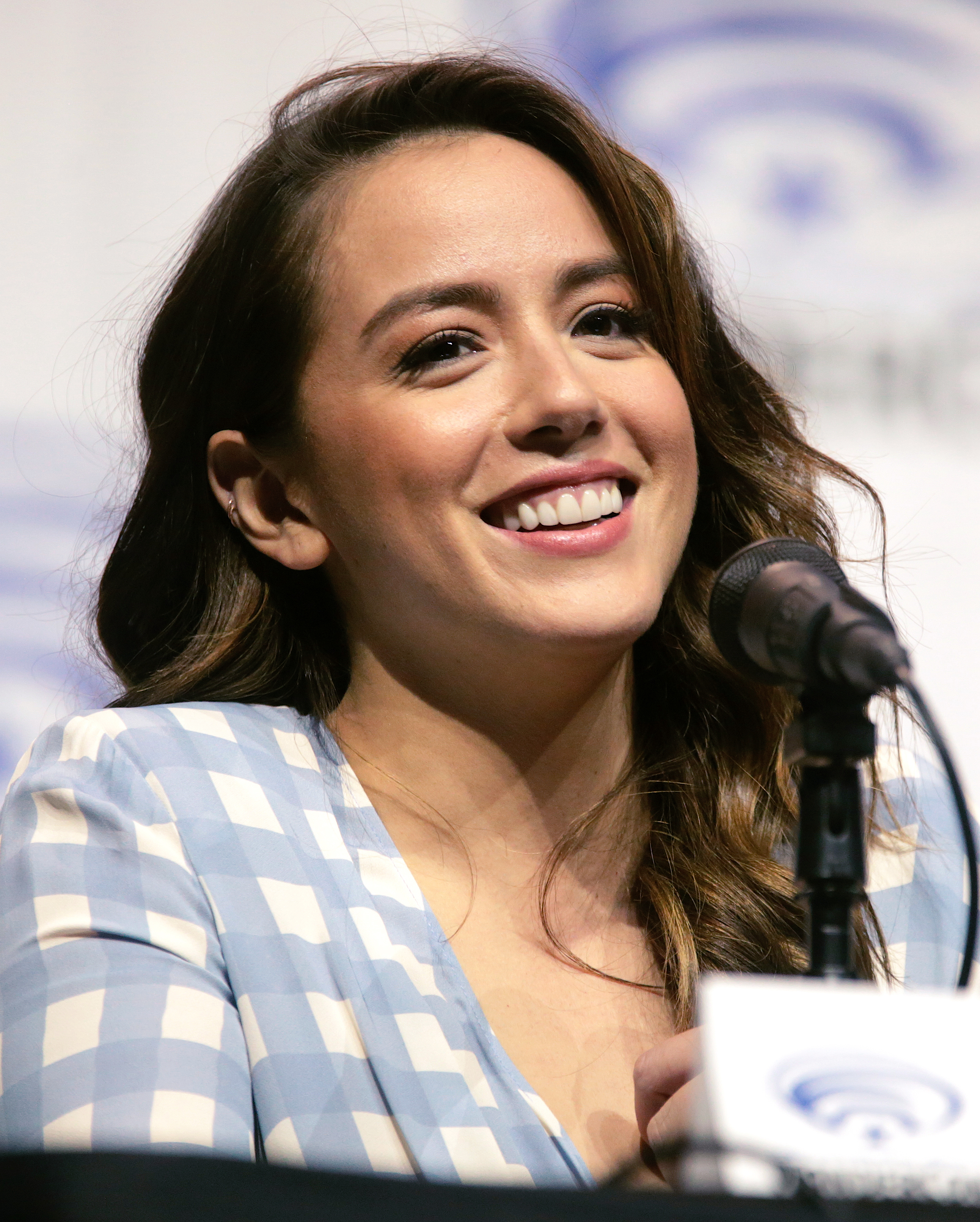
Chloe Bennet, who portrays Daisy Johnson / Quake in the ABC series Agents of S.H.I.E.L.D..

Going into the second season, Bennet noted on the character, "I think she's always someone who will wear her heart on her sleeve, but I think she's much smarter about it now, if that makes any sense. I don't think she's the type of person who can halfass anything, and that includes emotions. If she feels something, she feels something. But she knows how to control it more". Talking about the changes to the character after it was revealed that she was Daisy Johnson and an Inhuman, Tancharoen said "With this discovery will come some consequences, especially in her relationships with everyone around her, specifically Coulson...Needless to say, it's going to be a very complex, emotional journey for her. We have the ability on a television show to really explore the emotional journey of that. What does that mean now that she has this ability? Does she even want it?" Explaining some of these changes in the character, Bennet stated that "I make sure to try to keep the season one Daisy weaved through the new, badass Daisy....[but] she's changed a lot. She went into S.H.I.E.L.D. hating organizations like S.H.I.E.L.D., and now she's the epitome of S.H.I.E.L.D. She believes in everything that they believe in." Discussing the reveal that Skye is actually Daisy Johnson, Maurissa Tancharoen explained:

Johnson is a character that we always liked. We always knew there was a potential to evolve Skye into something else. It took a little bit of time, but we were happy when we were able to land on Daisy Johnson, and actually have that work in our mythology. But as with everything that we do on the show, we pull from the properties, and we do our own spin to it. So we are kind of merging a few concepts and storylines. We've spent a season and a half with Skye. We've seen her evolve as a person, we've grown to like her as a person, we've seen her evolve as an agent. And now, finally bringing her to her origin story—I think there's just a lot more emotional weight to it, because you already know her as just Skye, and now she will have this ability that she may not understand, that she may not want ... We're going to focus on Skye, and how that affects the people around her, and how the relationships may shift. Because we've seen through the course of our series so far; we've spoken about how S.H.I.E.L.D. treats gifteds or views them, and they're categorized, things like that. What does that mean when one of your own is now considered someone with an ability? How do you categorize her?

Whedon elaborated that "We're going to walk her through the steps of discovering what this really means, and coming to terms with it. All that stuff is really interesting to us, and in television, because we have time to explore, we can take her origin on all sorts of different paths." Additionally, Whedon talked about how the character would be referred to on the show after the reveal, saying, "She's still Skye, because she thinks she's Skye. I think her dad thinks she's Daisy, and we'll see if she ever gets to the point where she believes that that's something that she would want to call herself. But right now, she has her own identity."

Discussing the character becoming leader of the Secret Warriors, Bennet said, "What makes her such a good leader is how much she's been through, so she can relate to everyone on the team and she really has so much empathy and that's what I love about playing her. She really genuinely cares about everyone so deeply and it wears heavily on her because she obviously went through this big Inhuman change...And so what I think makes her such a good kind of...unconventional leader is that she's really kind of still learning and I think that's so realistic that leaders are—it's almost like when you grow up and you realize that your parents are just humans, parenting." Wen noted how the character "has evolved from being so anti-establishment into suddenly being someone who wants to create an establishment that would help and enhance the betterment of the world", to which Bennet said, "she was lost for a really long time, she was an orphan and she wanted to find her parents and all of a sudden she does and it's not what she expected. You know, when your mom tries to kill you and your dad is Hyde. So she's kind of grown into this."

Entering the fourth season, Bennet felt that, after the events of the final episode of season three, Johnson was "in a darker place. She's mourning. She cares about the team so much that she feels like she is protecting them by kind of pushing them away, because I think she feel like everything bad happens around her and she can't help but cause problems. Her way of taking care of the people she cares about is kind of pushing them away, which... is not the best thing." She also added that physically, Johnson would not be in great shape, since she is no longer under S.H.I.E.L.D.'s monitoring "containing and helping me grow my powers" so there would be "repercussions of her kind of using these powers and... abusing her body".

== Reception ==
Bennet received nominations for Favorite TV Actress and Favorite Female TV Star – Family Show at the 28th and 29th Kids' Choice Awards, respectively.

== Other appearances ==
=== Web series ===
- Daisy Johnson appears in the six-part digital series Agents of S.H.I.E.L.D.: Slingshot, with Bennet reprising her role.
- Daisy Johnson / Quake appears in Marvel Rising: Initiation, with Bennet reprising her role.
- Quake appears in Marvel Rising: Ultimate Comics, with Bennet reprising her role.

=== Film ===
- Daisy Johnson / Quake appears in the 2018 animated feature film Marvel Rising: Secret Warriors, with Bennet reprising her role.
- Photographs of Daisy Johnson / Quake from Agents of S.H.I.E.L.D. season 4 briefly appear in the 2023 animated feature film Spider-Man: Across the Spider-Verse in newspaper clippings pinned on a noticeboard in Miles Morales' room.

=== Video games ===
- Daisy Johnson / Quake appears as a team-up character in Marvel Heroes, with Bennet's likeness used for an alternate costume.
- Daisy Johnson / Quake appears as a playable character in Marvel: Future Fight, with Bennet's likeness used for an alternate costume.
- Daisy Johnson / Quake appears as a playable character in Lego Marvel's Avengers, through the Agents of S.H.I.E.L.D. DLC, with Bennet's likeness used.
- Daisy Johnson / Quake appears as a playable character in Lego Marvel Super Heroes 2, with Bennet's likeness used.
- Daisy Johnson / Quake appears as a playable character in Marvel: Contest of Champions, with Bennet's likeness used.
- Daisy Johnson / Quake appears as a playable character in the match-three mobile game Marvel Puzzle Quest.
