= Marvel's ABC television series =

2013–2020 superhero broadcast shows

- Promotional image for Agents of S.H.I.E.L.D. season two and Agent Carter season one
- Genre: Superhero
- Based on: Characters published by Marvel Comics
- Starring: See below
- Country of origin: United States
- Original language: English
- No. of seasons: 10 (across 3 series)
- No. of episodes: 162

Production
- Executive producers: Alan Fine; Stan Lee; Joe Quesada; Jim Chory; Jeph Loeb
- Running time: 41–44 minutes
- Production companies: ABC Studios; Marvel Television

Original release
- Network: ABC
- Release: September 24, 2013 – August 12, 2020

Marvel's ABC television series are a set of interconnected American television series created for the broadcast network ABC, based on characters that appear in publications by Marvel Comics. Produced by Marvel Television and ABC Studios, they are set in the Marvel Cinematic Universe (MCU) and acknowledge the continuity of the franchise's films and other television series. When categorizing their wider television slate, Marvel considers the ABC series to be their "Marvel Heroes" series.

The first television series in the MCU was Agents of S.H.I.E.L.D., developed by The Avengers (2012) writer/director Joss Whedon for Marvel Television and ABC. Starring Clark Gregg as Phil Coulson, reprising his role from the films, the series debuted in September 2013 and ran for seven seasons until August 2020. Marvel Studios was involved in Agent Carter, with Hayley Atwell reprising her role of Peggy Carter from the films, which ran for two seasons from January 2015 to March 2016. Inhumans, a project intended as an MCU film that was redeveloped as a series with IMAX Corporation, was released in 2017. A version of the series' first two episodes were released in IMAX theaters before the series' ABC premiere. Inhumans starred Anson Mount and was canceled after a single season.

Agents of S.H.I.E.L.D. debuted to strong ratings for ABC, but these steadily dropped and all three series ultimately became modest ratings performers. Reviews for S.H.I.E.L.D. compared it unfavorably to the MCU films at first, but these improved and the response to Agent Carter was more positive. Inhumans was not well received. Marvel and ABC attempted to develop several more series together, including a spin-off from S.H.I.E.L.D. called Marvel's Most Wanted, a comedy based on the Damage Control comics, and a drama centered on the Eternals. Development on any future series was halted when Marvel Television was folded into Marvel Studios in December 2019, though ABC remained committed to featuring Marvel content and began discussions with Marvel Studios for a new series shortly after.

== Development ==
By July 2012, Marvel Television had entered into discussions with ABC to create a show set in the Marvel Cinematic Universe (MCU). In August, ABC ordered a pilot for a series called S.H.I.E.L.D., developed by Joss Whedon who wrote and directed the MCU film The Avengers (2012); the series was renamed Agents of S.H.I.E.L.D. when it was officially picked up by ABC. Another MCU-based series, Agent Carter, was announced in January 2014 as joining Agents of S.H.I.E.L.D. at ABC. In November 2016, Marvel and IMAX Corporation announced Inhumans, based on the species of the same name, after a planned film based on the characters had been removed from Marvel Studios' release slate. The first two episodes of the series were set to premiere in IMAX theaters in September 2017 for two weeks, before airing on ABC with the remainder of the series. The deal was initially suggested to Marvel by IMAX after they had held a successful IMAX event with Game of Thrones in 2015. Ben Sherwood, president of Disney–ABC Television Group, described it as a "quadruple win—a win for IMAX, a win for Marvel, a win for ABC Studios and a win for ABC to launch a show in an innovative way and get attention" in an increasingly crowded market. Sherwood hoped that this would be the first of "several innovative ways to launch [television] programming".

Discussing Marvel Television's wider slate of series in August 2019, Marvel Television head Jeph Loeb explained that Marvel categorized its ABC series as the "Marvel Heroes" series due to their close connections to the MCU films, especially with the main characters of both Agents of S.H.I.E.L.D. and Agent Carter having originated in films before transitioning to their television series. In December 2019, after Marvel Studios began developing its own television series for the streaming service Disney+, Marvel Television was folded into Marvel Studios and development on future Marvel Television series halted. Despite this, ABC remained committed to featuring Marvel content, and ABC Entertainment president Karey Burke said in January 2020 that the network was beginning talks with Kevin Feige and Marvel Studios about what a potential Marvel Studios series on ABC would be.

== Series ==
ABC television series from Marvel Television
| Series | Season | Episodes | Originally released | | Showrunner(s) |
| Series | Season | Episodes | First released | Last released | Showrunner(s) |
|---|---|---|---|---|---|
| Agents of S.H.I.E.L.D. | 1 | 22 | September 24, 2013 | May 13, 2014 | Jed Whedon, Maurissa Tancharoen, and Jeffrey Bell |
| Agents of S.H.I.E.L.D. | 2 | 22 | September 23, 2014 | May 12, 2015 | Jed Whedon, Maurissa Tancharoen, and Jeffrey Bell |
| Agents of S.H.I.E.L.D. | 3 | 22 | September 29, 2015 | May 17, 2016 | Jed Whedon, Maurissa Tancharoen, and Jeffrey Bell |
| Agents of S.H.I.E.L.D. | 4 | 22 | September 20, 2016 | May 16, 2017 | Jed Whedon, Maurissa Tancharoen, and Jeffrey Bell |
| Agents of S.H.I.E.L.D. | 5 | 22 | December 1, 2017 | May 18, 2018 | Jed Whedon, Maurissa Tancharoen, and Jeffrey Bell |
| Agents of S.H.I.E.L.D. | 6 | 13 | May 10, 2019 | August 2, 2019 | Jed Whedon, Maurissa Tancharoen, and Jeffrey Bell |
| Agents of S.H.I.E.L.D. | 7 | 13 | May 27, 2020 | August 12, 2020 | Jed Whedon, Maurissa Tancharoen, and Jeffrey Bell |
| Agent Carter | 1 | 8 | January 6, 2015 | February 24, 2015 | Tara Butters, Michele Fazekas, and Chris Dingess |
| Agent Carter | 2 | 10 | January 19, 2016 | March 1, 2016 | Tara Butters, Michele Fazekas, and Chris Dingess |
| Inhumans | 1 | 8 | September 29, 2017 (Note: A version of the first two episodes debuted in IMAX theaters on September 1, 2017, and ran for two weeks, before their television premiere on ABC on September 29.) | November 10, 2017 | Scott Buck |

=== Agents of S.H.I.E.L.D. (2013–2020) ===
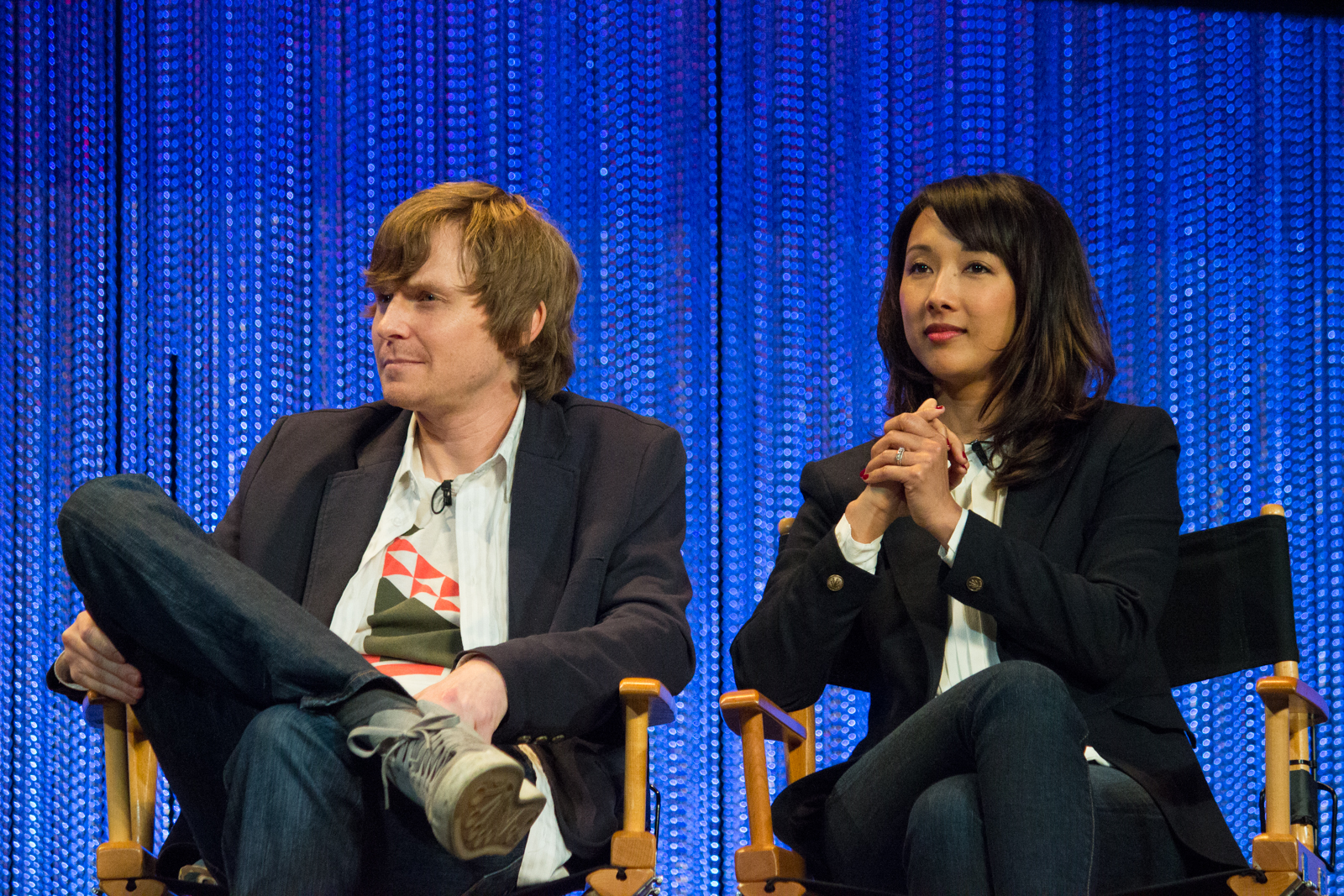
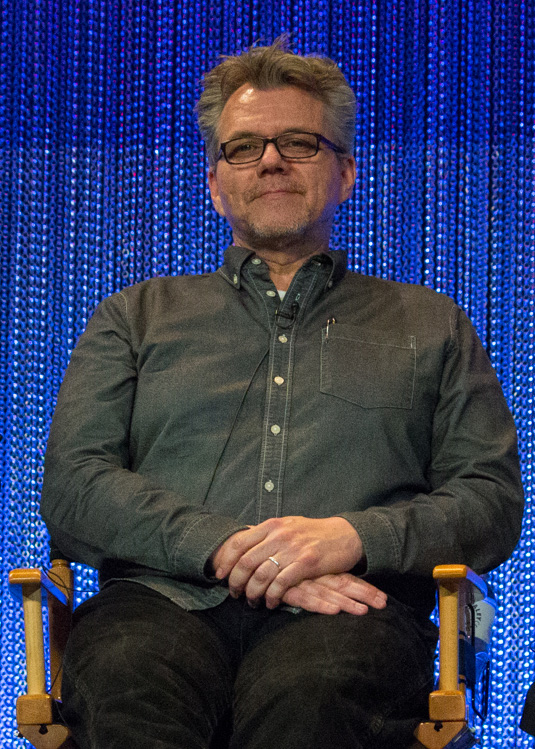
(L to R) Jed Whedon, Maurissa Tancharoen and Jeffrey Bell serve as the showrunners for Agents of S.H.I.E.L.D.

Agent Phil Coulson assembles a small team of S.H.I.E.L.D. agents to handle strange new cases. After the terrorist organization Hydra is discovered to have infiltrated S.H.I.E.L.D. in Captain America: The Winter Soldier (2014), Coulson and his team must rebuild the organization and restore trust from the government and public. Now working in secret, Coulson and his team come into contact with the Inhumans, a race of superhumans. After the defeat of the Inhuman Hive, and with Hydra destroyed, S.H.I.E.L.D. is made a legitimate organization once again. Coulson and the team face more enhanced people and threats, including Robbie Reyes / Ghost Rider and Life Model Decoys. Coulson and members of his team are eventually abducted to the future, where they must try and save humanity while figuring out how to get home.

In August 2012, ABC ordered a pilot for a show called S.H.I.E.L.D., to be written by Joss Whedon, Jed Whedon, and Maurissa Tancharoen, and directed by Joss Whedon. Later renamed to Agents of S.H.I.E.L.D., the series was officially ordered on May 10, 2013, with 22 episodes. Jed Whedon, Tancharoen, and Jeffrey Bell act as the series' showrunners, while Clark Gregg reprises his role from the films as Phil Coulson. The series was renewed for a second season on May 8, 2014, a third on May 7, 2015, a fourth on March 3, 2016, a fifth on May 11, 2017, a sixth on May 14, 2018, and a final seventh season on November 16, 2018; the sixth and seventh seasons consist of 13 episodes each.

The first season, which premiered on September 24, 2013, aired episodes that directly relate to events in the films Thor: The Dark World (2013) and Captain America: The Winter Soldier. The revelation in The Winter Soldier that S.H.I.E.L.D. had been infiltrated by Hydra had a huge impact on the series. Regarding the synergy the show had with addressing events from the film, Loeb said, "It's an extremely unique experience that doesn't exist anywhere else out there in the entertainment business." The second season, which premiered on September 23, 2014, introduces Inhumans to the MCU, ahead of their own television series. Additionally, a recurring plot point in the first two seasons involved the body of a Kree, an alien race that plays a significant role in Guardians of the Galaxy (2014). The third season, which premiered on September 29, 2015, introduces the Secret Warriors team, featuring new Inhuman characters inspired by the comic of the same name, as well as Life Model Decoys. The fourth season, which premiered on September 20, 2016, sees Ghost Rider introduced to the MCU, and ties to the second season of Agent Carter as well as Doctor Strange (2016). The last four episodes of the fifth season, which premiered on December 1, 2017, coincide with the events of Avengers: Infinity War (2018). The sixth season premiered on May 10, 2019, and the seventh season premiered on May 27, 2020. The two-part series finale aired on August 12, 2020.

Several actors reprise their MCU film roles in the first season: Samuel L. Jackson as Nick Fury, Cobie Smulders as Maria Hill, Maximiliano Hernández as Jasper Sitwell, and Jaimie Alexander as Sif. Additionally, Titus Welliver reprises his role of Felix Blake from the Marvel One-Shots short films. In the second season, Alexander and Smulders return, while Hayley Atwell appears as Peggy Carter, Neal McDonough as Timothy "Dum Dum" Dugan, Kenneth Choi as Jim Mortia, and Henry Goodman as Dr. List, all from previous MCU films again; Atwell appears in a crossover teasing her then-upcoming standalone series Agent Carter. In the third season, William Sadler reprises his role as Matthew Ellis from Iron Man 3 (2013), and Powers Boothe recurs as Gideon Malick, his previously unnamed character from The Avengers.

=== Agent Carter (2015–2016) ===
In 1946, Peggy Carter must balance the routine office work she does for the Strategic Scientific Reserve while secretly assisting Howard Stark, who finds himself framed for supplying deadly weapons to enemies of the United States. Carter is assisted by Stark's butler, Edwin Jarvis, to find those responsible and dispose of the weapons. Carter eventually moves from New York City to Los Angeles to deal with the threats of the new atomic age, gaining new friends, a new home, and potential new love.

By September 2013, Marvel was developing a series inspired by the Agent Carter One-Shot short film, featuring Peggy Carter, and the series was confirmed to be in development in January 2014. The pilot script was written by Captain America: The First Avenger (2011) and Captain America: The Winter Soldier writers Christopher Markus & Stephen McFeely. On May 8, 2014, ABC officially ordered Agent Carter to series. Tara Butters, Michele Fazekas, and Chris Dingess act as showrunners on the series, while Hayley Atwell reprises her role as Peggy Carter. Marvel Studios co-presidents Kevin Feige and Louis D'Esposito served as executive producers on the series. Fazekas said they were very interested in the production given Carter originated from the films, making Agent Carter the only Marvel Television series to have significant involvement from Marvel Studios. The series was renewed for a second season on May 7, 2015, and was officially canceled by ABC on May 12, 2016.

The first season, which premiered on January 6, 2015, introduces the origins of the Black Widow and Winter Soldier programs, which both appear in several MCU films. The second season, which premiered on January 19, 2016, features the Darkforce, which ties to the Agents of S.H.I.E.L.D. character Marcus Daniels and Doctor Strange.

In the first season, Dominic Cooper reprises his role of Howard Stark from The First Avenger. James D'Arcy portrays Edwin Jarvis, Stark's butler in the series who eventually serves as inspiration for Tony Stark's artificial intelligence J.A.R.V.I.S. Costa Ronin portrays a young Anton Vanko, the co-creator of the arc reactor with Stark. Chris Evans appears as Steve Rogers / Captain America via archive footage from The First Avenger. Neal McDonough and Toby Jones reprise their roles as Timothy "Dum Dum" Dugan and Arnim Zola, respectively. Cooper and D'Arcy return for the second season.

=== Inhumans (2017) ===
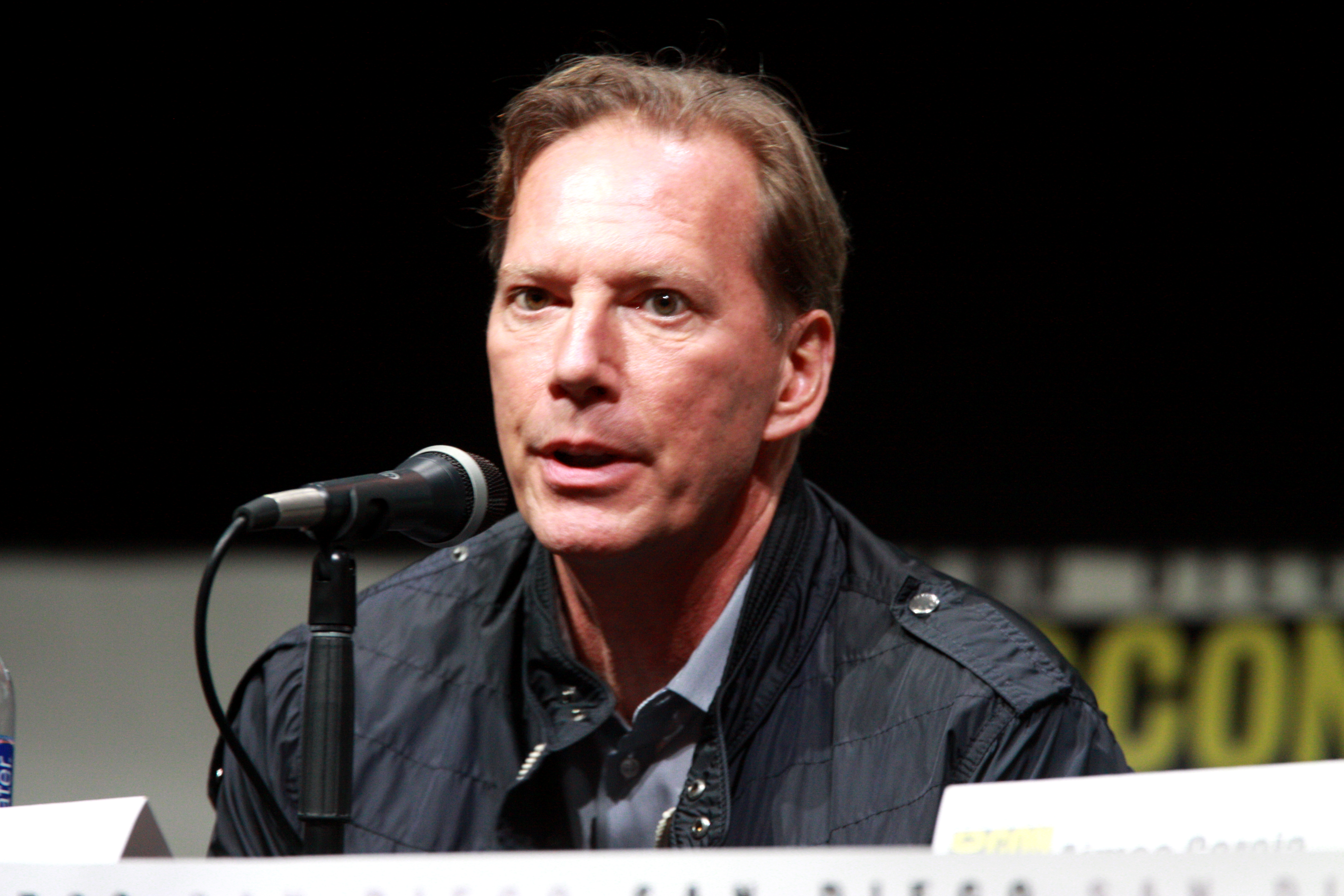
Scott Buck served as showrunner for Inhumans

After a military coup, the Inhuman Royal Family, led by Black Bolt, escape to Hawaii where they must save themselves and the world.

In November 2016, Marvel Television and IMAX Corporation announced Inhumans, to be produced in conjunction with ABC Studios. The series' first two episodes were filmed entirely on IMAX digital cameras, and aired on IMAX screens for two weeks beginning September 1, 2017. ABC then broadcast the series weekly starting with the first two episodes on September 29, with the network airing of the first two episodes featuring exclusive content, outside of the versions screened on IMAX. Select action sequences in the rest of the series were also shot on IMAX. The series was neither intended to be a reworking of the planned film from Marvel Studios, nor a spin-off from Agents of S.H.I.E.L.D. Sherwood added that the theatrical debut of the series was timed to not interfere with the release of any Marvel Studios films. In December 2016, Scott Buck was announced as showrunner and executive producer for the series. In February 2017, Anson Mount was cast as Black Bolt. ABC canceled the series on May 11, 2018.

== Cast and characters ==
List indicators
This section includes characters who have appeared in one of the series as a member of the main cast or as a guest star in multiple series.
- A dark grey cell indicates the character was not in the series.
- A ^{DS} indicates the character appears in a digital series.
- An ^{F} indicates the character appears in a film.
- A ^{G} indicates a guest appearance in the series.
- An ^{OS} indicates the character appears in a One-Shot.
- An ^{R} indicates a recurring role in the series.

| Character | Agents of S.H.I.E.L.D. | Agent Carter | Inhumans |
|---|---|---|---|
| Black Bolt | | | Anson Mount |
| Lincoln Campbell | Luke Mitchell | | |
| Peggy Carter^{F} ^{OS} | Hayley Atwell^{G} | Hayley Atwell | |
| Phil Coulson^{DS} ^{F} ^{OS} | Clark Gregg | | |
| Crystal | | | Isabelle Cornish |
| Roger Dooley | | Shea Whigham | |
| Timothy "Dum Dum" Dugan^{F} ^{OS} | Neal McDonough^{G} | Neal McDonough^{G} | |
| Leo Fitz^{DS} | Iain De Caestecker | | |
| Gorgon | | | Eme Ikwuakor |
| Lance Hunter | Nick Blood | | |
| Edwin Jarvis^{F} | | James D'Arcy | |
| Daisy "Skye" Johnson Quake^{DS} | Chloe Bennet | | |
| Karnak | | | Ken Leung |
| Louise | | | Ellen Woglom |
| Alphonso "Mack" Mackenzie^{DS} | Henry Simmons | | |
| Melinda May^{DS} | Ming-Na Wen | | |
| Maximus | | | Iwan Rheon |
| Medusa | | | Serinda Swan |
| Bobbi Morse | Adrianne Palicki | | |
| Holden Radcliffe | John Hannah | | |
| Elena "Yo-Yo" Rodriguez^{DS} | Natalia Cordova-Buckley | | |
| Jemma Simmons^{DS} | Elizabeth Henstridge | | |
| Deke Shaw | Jeff Ward | | |
| Daniel Sousa | Enver Gjokaj^{R} | Enver Gjokaj | |
| Jack Thompson | | Chad Michael Murray | |
| Grant Ward | Brett Dalton | | |

== Music ==
Albums for ABC series
| Title | U.S. release date | Length | Composer | Labels | Ref. |
|---|---|---|---|---|---|
| Marvel's Agents of S.H.I.E.L.D. (Original Soundtrack Album) | September 4, 2015 | 77:52 | Bear McCreary | Hollywood Records; Marvel Music | |
| Marvel's Agent Carter: Season 1 (Original Television Soundtrack) | December 11, 2015 | 65:31 | Christopher Lennertz | Hollywood Records; Marvel Music | |

== Reception ==
=== Ratings ===
Viewership and ratings per season of Marvel's ABC television series
| Series | Season | Timeslot (ET) | Episodes | First aired | | Last aired | | Viewership rank | Avg. viewers (millions) | 18–49 rank | Avg. 18–49 rating |
| Series | Season | Timeslot (ET) | Episodes | Date | Viewers (millions) | Date | Viewers (millions) | Viewership rank | Avg. viewers (millions) | 18–49 rank | Avg. 18–49 rating |
|---|---|---|---|---|---|---|---|---|---|---|---|
| Agents of S.H.I.E.L.D. | 1 | Tuesday 8:00 pm | 22 | September 24, 2013 | 12.12 | May 13, 2014 | 5.45 | 43 | 8.31 | 20 | 3.0 |
| Agents of S.H.I.E.L.D. | 2 | Tuesday 9:00 pm | 22 | September 23, 2014 | 5.98 | May 12, 2015 | 3.88 | 76 | 7.09 | 32 | 2.7 |
| Agents of S.H.I.E.L.D. | 3 | Tuesday 9:00 pm | 22 | September 29, 2015 | 4.90 | May 17, 2016 | 3.03 | 85 | 5.52 | 47 | 2.0 |
| Agents of S.H.I.E.L.D. | 4 | Tuesday 10:00 pm | 22 | September 20, 2016 | 3.44 | May 16, 2017 | 2.08 | 110 | 4.22 | 70 | 1.5 |
| Agents of S.H.I.E.L.D. | 5 | Friday 9:00 pm | 22 | December 1, 2017 | 2.54 | May 18, 2018 | 1.88 | 133 | 3.57 | 97 | 1.1 |
| Agents of S.H.I.E.L.D. | 6 | Friday 8:00 pm | 13 | May 10, 2019 | 2.31 | August 2, 2019 | 1.88 | N/A | N/A | N/A | N/A |
| Agents of S.H.I.E.L.D. | 7 | Wednesday 10:00 pm | 13 | May 27, 2020 | 1.82 | August 12, 2020 | 1.46 | N/A | N/A | N/A | N/A |
| Agent Carter | 1 | Tuesday 9:00 pm | 8 | January 6, 2015 | 6.91 | February 24, 2015 | 4.02 | 74 | 7.14 | 46 | 2.3 |
| Agent Carter | 2 | Tuesday 9:00 pm | 10 | January 19, 2016 | 3.18 | March 1, 2016 | 2.35 | 109 | 4.37 | 88 | 1.4 |
| Inhumans | 1 | Friday 9:00 pm | 8 | September 29, 2017 | 3.75 | November 10, 2017 | 1.95 | 121 | 4.14 | 80 | 1.2 |

=== Critical response ===
Critical response of Marvel's ABC television series
| Title | Season | Rotten Tomatoes | Metacritic |
|---|---|---|---|
| Agents of S.H.I.E.L.D. | 1 | 88% (72 reviews) | 74 (33 reviews) |
| Agents of S.H.I.E.L.D. | 2 | 91% (33 reviews) | —N/a |
| Agents of S.H.I.E.L.D. | 3 | 100% (22 reviews) | —N/a |
| Agents of S.H.I.E.L.D. | 4 | 96% (25 reviews) | —N/a |
| Agents of S.H.I.E.L.D. | 5 | 100% (23 reviews) | —N/a |
| Agents of S.H.I.E.L.D. | 6 | 93% (15 reviews) | —N/a |
| Agents of S.H.I.E.L.D. | 7 | 100% (15 reviews) | —N/a |
| Agent Carter | 1 | 98% (48 reviews) | 72 (27 reviews) |
| Agent Carter | 2 | 76% (21 reviews) | —N/a |
| Inhumans | 1 | 11% (47 reviews) | 27 (20 reviews) |

== Abandoned projects ==
=== Guillermo del Toro-developed Hulk series ===
In October 2010, ABC began early development on a Hulk television series with Marvel Television, with Guillermo del Toro and David Eick joining the following month to create and executive produce the series. The two would conceive the story of the pilot, with Eick writing the teleplay and del Toro planning to direct pending his availability. The series was described as being an origin story, focusing on a mid-twenties Bruce Banner and his relationship with Betty Ross, with plans to portray the Hulk through a mixture of prosthetics, puppetry, and CGI; del Toro was planning to design the Hulk for the series, drawing on his portrayal in the comics as well as the television series The Incredible Hulk (1978–1982). The series was intending to debut in late 2012 following the release of The Avengers. In August 2011, del Toro said the series would have "license" with its continuity, drawing more from the character's history in the comics than the MCU films, and a few months later at the 2011 New York Comic Con, Feige said the series could ultimately link up with the films.

The series was not ready for the 2012–13 season, and in May 2012, ABC Entertainment president Paul Lee said he hoped it would be ready for the 2013–14 season. By October 2012, del Toro mentioned that Marvel Television was hoping to get a particular writer on board to perform a rewrite and that the series was on hold. He also wondered about the fate of the series following the success of The Avengers. By November 2013, the series was no longer in active development, with Loeb saying "once we saw what Joss Whedon and Mark Ruffalo were creating in The Avengers, that was a better solution".

=== Marvel's Most Wanted ===
Ex-spies and ex-spouses Bobbi Morse and Lance Hunter are on the run trying to uncover a conspiracy against them. With no help from S.H.I.E.L.D., they enter into an uneasy partnership with rogue adventurer Dominic Fortune.

By April 2015, Marvel was developing a spinoff series from Agents of S.H.I.E.L.D. The series, which was being developed by Agents of S.H.I.E.L.D. executive producer Jeffrey Bell and writer Paul Zbyszewski, would be based on storylines occurring at the end of the second season of Agents of S.H.I.E.L.D., and would receive its own pilot rather than a backdoor pilot. Adrianne Palicki and Nick Blood entered into discussions to headline the potential new series as their characters Bobbi Morse and Lance Hunter, respectively. By May 7, 2015—when ABC announced their series renewals, cancellations, and new series pickups—the Agents of S.H.I.E.L.D. spinoff was passed on. In August 2015, the Agents of S.H.I.E.L.D. spinoff series received new life as a reworked series, titled Marvel's Most Wanted, with a pilot order. Bell and Zbyszewski once again developed the series, while also serving as co-writers of the pilot. The series would still focus on Morse and Hunter, with Palicki and Blood both attached, and was described as "a new take focusing on the same duo and their continuing adventures." In May 2016, the series was passed on by ABC once again.

=== John Ridley-developed Eternals series ===
From mid-April 2015, Marvel worked with screenwriter John Ridley to craft a new television series, "reinventing" an existing Marvel character or property. In January 2016, Ridley confirmed the project was in development and stated that he was looking to "bring some of the socially conscious nature" of Jessica Jones and his series American Crime to the show, while also creating something that is "straight entertainment". A year later, Channing Dungey revealed that Ridley's project was still progressing, with Ridley working on a rewrite of his script. Ridley added that the rewrite was not because "anything didn't work the first time around", but rather trying to make sure the series does something viewers have not necessarily seen before in a superhero television series, hoping it would occupy "a space that is not currently being filled" by Marvel. He also stated that he hoped to create the series "in the near term." By August 2017, Dungey was "not sure" if Ridley was still working on the project. It was confirmed to have "fizzled" in December 2019, and Ridley confirmed in January 2024 it was no longer in the works while revealing that his series had been centered around the Eternals. He explained his approach to the characters as "a really weird story", while stating that they are "a really hard property" to adapt and felt he "probably wasn't the right person for it and I probably couldn't make it what it needed to be". The Eternals characters were later repositioned for a feature film project from Marvel Studios titled Eternals (2021).

=== Damage Control ===
The show follows the overworked and underpaid clean-up crew of the Marvel Cinematic Universe that specializes in dealing with the aftermath of superhero conflicts, rescheduling events because of the conflicts, and retrieving lost items.

In October 2015, ABC ordered a put pilot for a half-hour live-action comedy series Marvel's Damage Control, based on the comics construction company of the same name. The series was being developed by Ben Karlin for ABC Studios and Marvel Television, with Karlin writing the script and serving as executive producer. Then ABC Entertainment president Paul Lee wanted the series to begin airing as early as the 2016–17 television season. Any development on the series was ended by December 2019.

The Damage Control organization was mentioned in the third season of Agents of S.H.I.E.L.D., before being introduced as the "Department of Damage Control" in Spider-Man: Homecoming (2017) with Tyne Daly portraying head of department Anne Marie Hoag.

=== Untitled Allan Heinberg-developed series ===
In September 2018, ABC gave a production commitment to a series featuring lesser-known female superheroes, written and executive produced by Allan Heinberg. The idea had been a "strong contender from the get-go" in terms of the new series that Marvel and ABC had been developing. However, in February 2019, ABC chose not to proceed with the pilot, despite its "big" production commitment. Nellie Andreeva of Deadline Hollywood said it was "unclear" if the series would be redeveloped.

=== Other ===
In January 2016, Lee announced that ABC Studios was developing a second comedy series with Marvel after Damage Control with the hope that it would air on ABC. Dungey said in May 2016 that there were "a handful of projects in development", after passing on Marvel's Most Wanted and canceling Agent Carter, and that Marvel and ABC were looking "at series that would be beneficial to both brands." In January 2018, she noted that Marvel and ABC "tried a few things that haven't worked out as well as we would've liked. We developed a couple things this season that we don't think are going to end up going forward, so we're going to look really carefully about what we do next, because the idea for us is to come up with something that works very well for both Marvel and ABC, so we're going to continue to try there." In August 2018, Dungey said "we're cooking up a couple things for broadcast" in terms of potential new Marvel series on ABC, and that there was one idea in particular that she was excited to talk about.

In August 2019, ABC Entertainment president Karey Burke stated that ABC was in active discussions with Marvel regarding "one project in particular" that would be "something brand new, mostly" and be a female-focused superhero series. This project was separate from the female-focused superhero series developed for ABC by Allan Heinberg earlier in 2019. Plans for the series had "stalled" by January 2020, a month after Marvel Television announced they were no longer developing new series. The Marvel Studios Special Presentation The Guardians of the Galaxy Holiday Special (2022) was originally conceived during the production of Guardians of the Galaxy Vol. 2 (2017) for development on ABC, before ultimately becoming the first piece of content Marvel Studios planned to create for Disney+, where it ultimately released.

== See also ==
- Marvel's Netflix television series
- Marvel's young adult television series
- Adventure into Fear
