= Stolen (Agents of S.H.I.E.L.D.) =

- Agents of S.H.I.E.L.D. episode
- James Paxton's performance as a young John Garrett (L) was mostly praised by critics, while Nathaniel Malick, played by Thomas E. Sullivan, (R) was highly criticized
- Episode no.: Season 7 Episode 10
- Directed by: Garry A. Brown
- Story by: Mark Linehan Bruner
- Teleplay by: George Kitson; Mark Leitner
- Cinematography by: Kyle Jewell
- Editing by: Eric Litman
- Original air date: July 29, 2020
- Running time: 41 minutes

Guest appearances
- Enver Gjokaj as Daniel Sousa; Dichen Lachman as Jiaying; Thomas E. Sullivan as Nathaniel Malick; James Paxton as John Garrett; Dianne Doan as Kora; Tipper Newton as Roxy Glass; Byron Mann as Li

Episode chronology
← Previous "As I Have Always Been"	Next → "Brand New Day"
- Agents of S.H.I.E.L.D. season 7

"Stolen" is the tenth episode of the seventh season of the American television series Agents of S.H.I.E.L.D. Based on the Marvel Comics organization S.H.I.E.L.D., it follows a Life Model Decoy (LMD) of Phil Coulson and his team of S.H.I.E.L.D. agents as they race to stop the unraveling of history in the 1980s. It is set in the Marvel Cinematic Universe (MCU) and acknowledges the franchise's films. The episode was written by George Kitson and Mark Leitner, from a story by Mark Linehan Bruner, and directed by Garry A. Brown.

Clark Gregg reprises his role as Coulson from the film series, starring alongside Ming-Na Wen, Chloe Bennet, Elizabeth Henstridge, Henry Simmons, Natalia Cordova-Buckley, and Jeff Ward.

"Stolen" originally aired on ABC on July 29, 2020, and was watched by 1.30 million viewers.

== Plot ==
Stranded in 1983 due to a malfunctioning time drive, the S.H.I.E.L.D. agents plan to restore order to the timeline by defeating Nathaniel Malick and rescuing the Inhumans he has taken prisoner at the sanctuary, Afterlife. Noting that Agent Daisy Johnson could be erased from history if her mother, Jiaying, were to be killed, Director Alphonso "Mack" Mackenzie instead sends LMD Phil Coulson into the facility with the teleporting Inhuman Gordon while he and Agent Elena "Yo-Yo" Rodriguez provide back-up. Meanwhile, Johnson learns from Melinda May that she had a sister named Kora, who committed suicide in the original timeline before she was born, but who has been rescued by Malick and turned into one of his acolytes in this version of events.

At Afterlife, Malick uses the Chronicom Time Stream to look into the future. Using this knowledge, he recruits a young John Garrett and shows him his future wherein he betrays S.H.I.E.L.D. to join Hydra and Coulson kills him. Upon their arrival, Coulson and Gordon are captured, before Malick transfers the latter's powers to Garrett. Imprisoned with Coulson, Gordon teleports the S.H.I.E.L.D. agent to freedom, dying in the process. When Coulson fails to make contact, Mack and Yo-Yo enter Afterlife and free the captured Inhumans and Coulson, who tranquilizes Kora on his way out, before bringing them all to their headquarters, the Lighthouse.

Meanwhile, Daniel Sousa convinces Johnson to speak with her mother, helping to reconcile the pair after Jiaying's death in the present during the main timeline. Malick and Garrett teleport into the Lighthouse, where the former, using the abilities he took from her in 1976, (Note: As depcited in "Adapt or Die".) knocks Johnson to the ground and kills Jiaying before escaping. Garrett kidnaps Jemma Simmons and takes her and Malick onto S.H.I.E.L.D.'s mobile headquarters, Zephyr One, and Malick and Garrett hijack it, with Deke Shaw unknowingly trapped inside the engineering bay. After heading into space and out of range of S.H.I.E.L.D.'s satellites, Malick notes to a captured Simmons that every version of events where he does not win the battle with S.H.I.E.L.D. occurs because of her husband Leo Fitz, and demands she reveal his location.

== Production ==
=== Development ===
After the sixth season finale of Agents of S.H.I.E.L.D. aired in August 2019, showrunners Jed Whedon, Maurissa Tancharoen, and Jeffrey Bell revealed that the seventh season would feature the team trying to save the world from invasion by the Chronicoms. They used time travel to do this, allowing the season to explore the history of S.H.I.E.L.D. Later that month, one of the season's episodes was revealed to be titled "Stolen" and written by George Kitson and Mark Leitner from a story by Mark Linehan Bruner. It was confirmed to be the tenth episode of the season in July 2020, when Garry A. Brown was revealed to have directed it. Bruner was Bell's assistant at the start of the season, and was scheduled to be the writer of the episode as a freelancer. However, after starting the outline of the script, he was hired as a staff writer on Legends of Tomorrow, resulting in Kitson and Leitner taking over writing duties. After completing the script before production began, Leitner also left as he was hired on another series as well.

=== Casting ===
With the season renewal, main cast members Ming-Na Wen, Chloe Bennet, Elizabeth Henstridge, Henry Simmons, Natalia Cordova-Buckley, and Jeff Ward were confirmed to be returning from previous seasons as Melinda May, Daisy Johnson / Quake, Jemma Simmons, Alphonso "Mack" Mackenzie, Elena "Yo-Yo" Rodriguez, and Deke Shaw, respectively. Series star Clark Gregg also returns as his character Phil Coulson, portraying a Life Model Decoy version of the character.

In July 2020, Gregg discussed actors that he wished could return for the seventh season, including Bill Paxton who portrayed John Garrett in the series' first season before his death in February 2017. Gregg said it would be "really amazing if there was some way to feel like we had the spirit of Bill Paxton with us" and teased that could happen in the season. Later that month, Paxton's son James was revealed to be guest starring in "Stolen" as a younger version of John Garrett. James Paxton rewatched all of his father's episodes from earlier in the season to prepare, learning the cadence Bill used when speaking his lines. James felt he could increase the character's energy and excitement in certain moments, because the younger version was "probably even more of a hothead and excitable at that age".

Other guest stars appearing alongside Paxton include: Enver Gjokaj reprising his Agent Carter role as agent Daniel Sousa, Dichen Lachman as Jiaying, Thomas E. Sullivan as Nathaniel Malick, Dianne Doan as Kora, Tipper Newton as Roxy Glass, and Byron Mann as Li. All return from earlier in the season. Fin Argus also returns as a young Gordon.

=== Marvel Cinematic Universe tie-ins ===
Shaw listens to a cassette of Deke Squad Mix Vol. 2 on a Walkman, a reference to Star-Lord from Guardians of the Galaxy (2014). Meagan Damore from Comic Book Resources noted the Walkman reference was "a tongue-in-cheek nod to the fans who once speculated that Deke was Star-Lord"; when Shaw first appeared in season five, he wore a helmet similar to Star-Lord's mask.

== Release ==
"Stolen" was first aired in the United States on ABC on July 29, 2020.

== Reception ==
=== Ratings ===
In the United States the episode received a 0.3 percent share among adults between the ages of 18 and 49, meaning that it was seen by 0.3 percent of all households in that demographic. It was watched by 1.30 million viewers. Within a week of release, "Stolen" was watched by 2.32 million viewers.

=== Critical response ===
The A.V. Club's Alex McLevy gave the episode a "B", stating the episode had "a strong script, fleet pacing, and some especially good character dynamics from Daisy, Simmons, and Coulson". He noted "the heart of the episode" was Daisy's interaction with Jiaying. McLevy added the show "could stand to do a little more with" Malick having the Timestream, as there was the potential "to really stack the deck against S.H.I.E.L.D. in these last few episodes." Writing for Den of Geek, Michael Ahr felt the best moments of the episode were between Daisy and Jiaying, and enjoyed the twist of Malick searching for Simmons. Ahr also enjoyed Daisy going "into god mode" and the frightened look on Malick's face "was priceless". He concluded that the "story possibilities are thankfully starting to open up for [the series'] final three episodes", giving the episode 4 stars out of 5. Awarding the episode a "B", Wesley Coburn of Bam! Smack! Pow! felt the episode "started slowly, but ramped up the action quotient and tension steadily while beginning to shift the characters into their places for the series finale."

Syfy Wire's Trent Moore felt including John Garrett into the season helped turn the "greatest hits" approach to the season "into one heck of a ride". He said, "Ending the series with this time travel adventure has been such an effective way to play in the sandbox this show has spent six amazing years creating. Let's just sit back and enjoy the ride." Jamie Jirak from ComicBook.com felt James Paxton "could not have done a better job embodying his father" in the episode, adding he "perfectly captur[ed] the sly charm that made Garrett so much fun". Ahr also thought Paxton did a "spot-on impression" of his father, while Coburn called Paxton's mannerisms "spot-on".

Christian Houlb of Entertainment Weekly was more critical of the episode, calling it "really lame" and was "disappointed at the level of weak sauce Agents of S.H.I.E.L.D. is supplying us in its final episodes." Houlb called Nathaniel Malick "really annoying" and did not have enough good qualities to justify being the primary villain of the final season, but compared to John Garrett, Malick was "a magnetic and compelling supervillain". Garrett for Houlb was "awful" given his "unbearable" dialogue that he was screaming "in the screechiest possible voice". Giving the episode a "C−", he concluded the series was "running on fumes" at this point. The other reviewers also took issue with Nathaniel Malick as the season's villain. McLevy felt either Thomas E. Sullivan's performance or how the show has not established the character as a threat resulted in a lack of "imposing malevolence necessary to make this showdown as monumental as it wants to be... It feels like a step down from the Chronicom plot we've been dealing with". Ahr called him "not a great Agents of S.H.I.E.L.D. villain" as his love of anarchy "comes across as a very bland flavor of evil" and knowing the future "gives him an advantage that he doesn't deserve, making his position of power in the narrative feel very much unearned."
