= Brand New Day (Agents of S.H.I.E.L.D.) =

- Agents of S.H.I.E.L.D. episode
- Episode no.: Season 7 Episode 11
- Directed by: Keith Potter
- Written by: Chris Freyer
- Cinematography by: Allan Westbrook
- Editing by: Dexter Adriano
- Original air date: August 5, 2020
- Running time: 43 minutes

Guest appearances
- Joel Stoffer as Enoch; Thomas E. Sullivan as Nathaniel Malick; Dianne Doan as Kora; James Paxton as John Garrett; Enver Gjokaj as Daniel Sousa; Iain De Caestecker as Leo Fitz

Episode chronology
← Previous "Stolen"	Next → "The End Is at Hand"
- Agents of S.H.I.E.L.D. season 7

"Brand New Day" is the eleventh episode of the seventh season of the American television series Agents of S.H.I.E.L.D. Based on the Marvel Comics organization S.H.I.E.L.D., it follows a Life Model Decoy (LMD) of Phil Coulson and his team of S.H.I.E.L.D. agents as they race to stop the Chronicoms from succeeding in their plan. It is set in the Marvel Cinematic Universe (MCU) and acknowledges the franchise's films. The episode was written by Chris Freyer and directed by Keith Potter.

Clark Gregg reprises his role as Coulson from the film series, starring alongside Ming-Na Wen, Chloe Bennet, Elizabeth Henstridge, Henry Simmons, Natalia Cordova-Buckley, and Jeff Ward. Iain De Caestecker guest stars in the episode, making his first appearance of the season.

"Brand New Day" originally aired on ABC on August 5, 2020, and was watched by 1.25 million viewers, a series and season low.

== Plot ==
Following the events of "Stolen", Phil Coulson returns to S.H.I.E.L.D.'s headquarters, the Lighthouse, with Daisy Johnson's sister Kora, an Inhuman with the ability to shoot energy beams from her hands. Despite her affiliation with the anarchist Nathaniel Malick, Kora professes her desire to become a member of S.H.I.E.L.D., much to the others' skepticism. Revealing that the S.H.I.E.L.D. team created a parallel timeline when they traveled to 1931, Kora claims that she wants to improve this course of events by killing people who will go on to do bad things, including the young Grant Ward, who went on to betray Coulson's team in the original timeline.

Meanwhile, Malick, John Garrett, and a crew of mercenaries have flown into space in S.H.I.E.L.D.'s mobile headquarters, Zephyr One. Taking Agents Deke Shaw and Jemma Simmons prisoner, Malick uses a brain-scanning device to scan her memories and determine her husband's Leo Fitz's location. (Note: Among these memories are flashback scenes taken from the past episodes "Beginning of the End", "Bouncing Back", and "New Life".) In one of these memories, Malick learns Fitz and Simmons spent an extended period of time together before she was sent back into the past. However, he is unable to determine Fitz's location due to the presence of a brain implant in Simmons' head. When she is released from the brain machine, Simmons does not remember who Fitz is.

Concurrently, Johnson plans to use a quinjet to reach Zephyr One and rescue Simmons and Shaw before being joined by Alphonso "Mack" Mackenzie and Daniel Sousa. While in space, Mack reassures Johnson that they will be alright if this is indeed their last mission together, as predicted by their late ally Enoch. Encouraged by Mack, who also threatens him not to break her heart, Sousa teases Johnson about her superhero nickname "Quake".

Melinda May interrogates Kora, but inadvertently provokes her into knocking out the Lighthouse's power supply, enabling the Chronicom Sibyl to hack into its computer system and download a list of S.H.I.E.L.D. bases. After discovering his LMD body allows him to read computer code, Coulson attempts to slow Sibyl down while May tells Kora Malick killed her mother in an attempt to sway her away from his side, but Garrett arrives and teleports her onto Zephyr One. As Johnson, Mack, and Sousa approach Zephyr One, a fleet of Chronicom spaceships rendezvous with it and proceed to destroy S.H.I.E.L.D.'s facilities, including the Triskelion.

== Production ==
=== Development ===
After the sixth season finale of Agents of S.H.I.E.L.D. aired in August 2019, showrunners Jed Whedon, Maurissa Tancharoen, and Jeffrey Bell revealed that the seventh season would feature the team trying to save the world from invasion by the Chronicoms. They used time travel to do this, allowing the season to explore the history of S.H.I.E.L.D. Later that month, one of the season's episodes was revealed to be titled "Brand New Day" and written by Christopher Freyer. It was confirmed to be the eleventh episode of the season in July 2020, when Keith Potter was revealed to have directed it. Kevin Tancharoen was originally scheduled to direct the episode, but ultimately had to drop out because of other commitments and wanting a break before filming the series finale. Potter had already begun prep work on the episode as the assistant director, and given his past directing experience on an episode of season six and Agents of S.H.I.E.L.D.: Slingshot, resulted in him being asked to direct.

=== Writing ===
Freyer wrote the scene between Alphonso "Mack" Mackenzie and Daisy Johnson on the Quinjet to be reflective of what "the cast and the crew and us as writers were going through at the time", coming to terms with the series ending. Nathaniel Malick and Kora's kiss was not originally part of the script, but was added on the day of shooting.

=== Casting ===
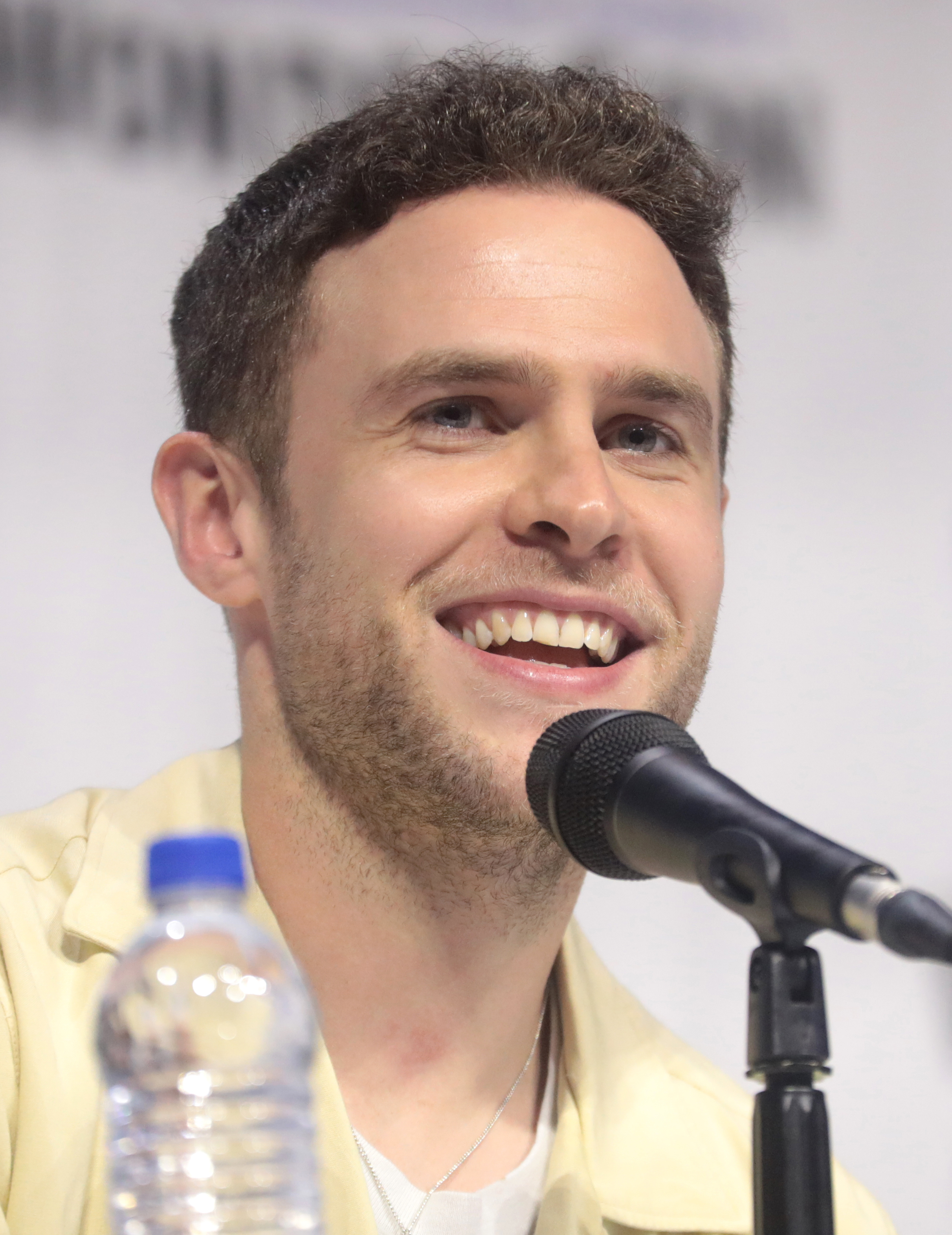
Iain De Caestecker returns to the series in this episode, after being absent from the first ten episodes of the season

With the season renewal, main cast members Ming-Na Wen, Chloe Bennet, Elizabeth Henstridge, Henry Simmons, Natalia Cordova-Buckley, and Jeff Ward were confirmed to be returning from previous seasons as Melinda May, Daisy Johnson / Quake, Jemma Simmons, Alphonso "Mack" Mackenzie, Elena "Yo-Yo" Rodriguez, and Deke Shaw, respectively. Series star Clark Gregg also returns as his character Phil Coulson, portraying a Life Model Decoy version of the character. Iain De Caestecker was also announced as a main cast member returning as Leo Fitz with the season renewal, but he does not appear in any previous episodes of the season as he was committed to another project when the season started filming. De Caestecker makes his first appearance of the season in "Brand New Day" appearing in flashback sequences; he is credited as a special guest star.

Additional guest stars in the episode include Joel Stoffer as Enoch, Thomas E. Sullivan as Nathaniel Malick, Dianne Doan as Kora, James Paxton as John Garrett, and Enver Gjokaj reprising his Agent Carter role of agent Daniel Sousa. All reprise their roles from earlier in the season.

=== Filming ===
Filming for the episode occurred around the series' panel at San Diego Comic-Con on July 18, 2019. This presented scheduling challenges for filming the episode, particularly the scenes with Fitz and Simmons, as the producers were working around De Caestecker's other commitments along with the series' commitments to Comic-Con. As such, Henstridge and De Caestecker returned to Los Angeles to film some of their scenes after the panel, before being brought back to San Diego for the rest of Comic-Con. Director Keith Potter used a slight Dutch angle for close-up shots on Malick because the character is "off kilter" to give those shots "an edgy feeling". Mack and Daisy's scene was originally conceived with the characters sitting in the Quinjet jump seats. On the day of shooting, Bennet felt she should sit on the ground instead, and in doing so, Potter said it "changed the dynamic [of the scene] so much".

== Release ==
"Brand New Day" was first aired in the United States on ABC on August 5, 2020.

== Reception ==
=== Ratings ===
In the United States the episode received a 0.3 percent share among adults between the ages of 18 and 49, meaning that it was seen by 0.3 percent of all households in that demographic. It was watched by 1.25 million viewers. The initial viewers were the lowest for the season and series. Within a week of release, "Brand New Day" was watched by 2.34 million viewers.

=== Critical response ===
Giving the episode a "B−", Alex McLevy of The A.V. Club said "the unexpected introduction of actual stakes outside the isolated existence of our heroes was a sharp reminder of how much heavy lifting the show has labored to get done en route to its finale." He continued that the 13 episodes of the season had been a deterrent for the series, making the story feel rushed that did not allow "sufficient time to develop and explore the nature of everything that's happened with the timeline, the characters, and the overarching dynamics of both the plot and the series endgame." Speaking to the short sequences with Fitz in the episode, McLevy felt the episode moved on to other story points too quick, not allowing viewers the "chance to sit with one of the most important relationships and plot points of the entire season." Conversely, the scene with Mack, Daisy, and Sousa was a highlight for McLevy since it allowed the characters to "shoot the shit and reminisce, while also giving them a chance to open up about their fears and insecurities regarding the impending breakup of the team". McLevy called the CGI of the destruction of the Triskelion "excellent", despite the rest of the episode being "stuck in the lackluster drab color palette and staging that so often plagued the series". Wesley Coburn writing for Bam! Smack! Pow! called Fitz and Simmons finally interacting "very cathartic" and felt the episode was "poignant" and "wholesome", giving it an "A".

Michael Ahr from Den of Geek felt it was a "necessary but frustrating decision to focus on Kora and Nathaniel" in the episode, saying while their "motivations undoubtedly became more clearly defined", it was not high on fans priorities to dedicate an episode towards. Ahr called Daisy calling Simmons her sister in the episode "refreshing", and enjoyed the minimalist setting for the Mack, Daisy, and Sousa scene. Ahr gave the episode 3.5 stars out of 5, concluding that it was "not really all that satisfying to see the pieces fall into place" and that the excitement for the finale next episode "springs not from the setup of this episode but from its own momentous nature as the end of Agents of S.H.I.E.L.D. Writing for Entertainment Weekly, Christian Holub gave the episode a "B−". He found it difficult to "get invested in [Kora]'s journey since we just met her a few weeks ago" but enjoy Fitz being featured in the episode, since "the implications of where (or when) Fitz might be" were "he most interesting element" of the episode. However, he hoped whatever narrative twist was being employed with Fitz "was worth losing [him] for the entire final season". Syfy Wire's Trent Moore enjoyed the fake out in the episode of Deke being set up to be the hero on the Zephyr, only "to be caught in the first 5 seconds". He added the secret around Fitz was "getting scarier by the week" and felt the brewing relationship between Sousa and Daisy "took a step forward this week", which Moore called "one of the most fun surprises of the season".
