= Agents of S.H.I.E.L.D. series finale =

"The End Is at Hand" and "What We're Fighting For"
- Agents of S.H.I.E.L.D. episodes
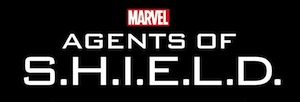
- Title card for "What We're Fighting For"
- Episode nos.: Season 7 Episodes 12 and 13
- Directed by: Chris Cheramie (12); Kevin Tancharoen (13)
- Written by: Jeffrey Bell (12); Jed Whedon (13)
- Cinematography by: Kyle Jewell (12); Allan Westbrook (13)
- Editing by: Kelly Stuyvesant (12); Eric Litman (13)
- Original air date: August 12, 2020
- Running time: 43 minutes (each)

Guest appearances
- Tamara Taylor as Sibyl; Thomas E. Sullivan as Nathaniel Malick; Dianne Doan as Kora; James Paxton as John Garrett; Stephen Bishop as Brandon Gamble; Bill Cobbs; Enver Gjokaj as Daniel Sousa; Iain De Caestecker as Leo Fitz; Joel Stoffer as Enoch; Briana Venskus as Piper; Maximilian Osinski as Davis; Coy Stewart as Flint

Episode chronology
← Previous "Brand New Day"	Next → —
- Agents of S.H.I.E.L.D. season 7

The two-part series finale of the American television series Agents of S.H.I.E.L.D. consists of the twelfth and thirteenth episodes of the seventh season, "The End Is at Hand" and "What We're Fighting For". Based on the Marvel Comics organization S.H.I.E.L.D., it follows a Life Model Decoy (LMD) of Phil Coulson and his team of S.H.I.E.L.D. agents returning to their timeline as they race to stop the Chronicoms from succeeding in their plan. It is set in the Marvel Cinematic Universe (MCU) and acknowledges the franchise's films. "The End Is at Hand" was written by Jeffrey Bell and directed by Chris Cheramie, while "What We're Fighting For" was written by Jed Whedon and directed by Kevin Tancharoen.

Clark Gregg reprises his role as Coulson from the film series, starring alongside Ming-Na Wen, Chloe Bennet, Elizabeth Henstridge, Henry Simmons, Natalia Cordova-Buckley, and Jeff Ward. Iain De Caestecker also guest stars in the episode.

The episodes originally aired on ABC on August 12, 2020, and were watched by 1.46 million viewers. The episodes received critical acclaim and were praised for the writing, performances, and visual effects. Critics felt the episodes served as a satisfying conclusion to the series and commended the finale for its ambition and lower scale. "What We're Fighting For" was nominated for Outstanding Achievement in Sound Editing – Episodic Short Form – Dialogue/ADR and Outstanding Achievement in Sound Editing – Episodic Short Form – Effects / Foley at the Golden Reel Awards 2020.

== Plot ==
=== "The End Is at Hand" ===
Following the events of "Brand New Day", Agents Daisy Johnson, Alphonso "Mack" Mackenzie, and Daniel Sousa find S.H.I.E.L.D.'s mobile headquarters, Zephyr One, empty as a series of tractor beams pull them into the Chronicom ship. Chronicom leader Sibyl, Nathaniel Malick, and Inhuman Kora imprison Deke Shaw and Jemma Simmons after injecting Simmons with a serum to dissolve her memory implant to locate her husband Leo Fitz. As Simmons' memory is affected, Shaw attempts to help her remember. Johnson infiltrates the ship to save them while Mack and Sousa defend Zephyr One from Chronicoms and work on their escape plan. Aware of their presence, Sibyl orders Malick not to interfere with Johnson and Simmons' reunion as it will increase their chances of finding Fitz. As Sibyl predicted, Johnson reunites with Shaw and Simmons and jogs the latter's memory, but Kora interrupts the process when she confronts Johnson, who refuses to fight her. Conflicted, Kora lets Johnson escape and confides in Malick, who stuns her. Shaw, Simmons, and Johnson return to Zephyr One and successfully escape the Chronicom ship.

At S.H.I.E.L.D.'s remaining base, the Lighthouse, Phil Coulson works to decipher a sudden surge of signals while Melinda May and Elena "Yo-Yo" Rodriguez initiate lockdown protocols as John Garrett teleports in and begins setting up explosives around the base. Together, they trap Garrett with a power inhibiting device and contact Malick, hoping to stop the explosives from going off, but Malick detonates them anyway. Garrett is injured in the blast, but Coulson believes he may be an asset to them and saves him. Recovering from Malick's betrayal, Garrett decides to join S.H.I.E.L.D. Coulson identifies the signal as the location of an 0-8-4, and with Garrett's help, he, May, and Yo-Yo teleport to the speakeasy in New York, where Garrett is killed on arrival. There, they meet several S.H.I.E.L.D. agents, who have also heard the signal and all brought a package containing an 0-8-4, per the late Enoch's instructions. Johnson, Mack, Simmons, Shaw, and Sousa arrive and the team reunite. Despite losing her memory, Simmons subconsciously constructs a portal device with the 0-8-4s and uses her wedding ring to activate it, bringing Fitz to their location, who soon realizes that Simmons's memory has been affected.

=== "What We're Fighting For" ===
Reunited, Fitz explains that Kora is the key to stopping the Chronicoms and that the team has been operating in an alternate timeline. Using the time drive and the portal device, Fitz says they can return home and bring the Chronicoms with them. After making preparations, May navigates Zephyr One and the Chronicom ships through the Quantum Realm back to their timeline while Fitz works with Simmons to restore her memory. Shaw chooses to stay behind and becomes the new director of S.H.I.E.L.D. in the alternate timeline.

Amidst the events of "New Life", Fitz and Simmons escaped with Enoch onto Agent Piper and Inhuman Flint's quinjet and have the latter recreate a piece of the time monolith before fleeing to the Theta Serpentis system with a Time Stream Enoch stole from the Chronicoms for Fitz to study. During that time, they worked on building the time machine, Coulson's LMD, and Simmons' implant, while also living their lives together and raising a daughter, Alya. Once the time machine is complete, Enoch, Fitz, and Simmons return to the moment they left Piper and Flint, asking them to guard a pod with Fitz and Alya inside while Simmons leaves with Enoch to rescue the others, leading into the events of "The New Deal". Upon their return, a disguised Fitz, Simmons, Yo-Yo, and Sousa help past Simmons recover the team before retaking the Lighthouse from the Chronicoms.

Meanwhile, Coulson, May, Johnson, and Mack infiltrate the Chronicom ship to save Kora. While Johnson confronts Malick, Coulson tricks Sibyl into sending her Chronicom army to the Lighthouse. After May overpowers Sibyl, she combines her abilities with Kora's to magnify a beacon of empathy into the Chronicom army, stopping the assault. Coulson, May, Mack, and Kora escape as Johnson stays behind to destroy the Chronicom ship, killing Sibyl and Malick. The team rescue Johnson from space and Kora revives her as Fitz and Simmons return to the temple and retrieve Alya.

One year later, the team virtually gather at the speakeasy to reminisce about their time together. Mack continues to lead S.H.I.E.L.D., with Yo-Yo as one of his top agents, May is a professor at S.H.I.E.L.D.'s Coulson Academy with Flint as one of her students, Fitz and Simmons have retired to raise Alya, Johnson explores the cosmos with Sousa and Kora on Zephyr Three, and Coulson travels the world in an upgraded version of his 1962 Chevrolet Corvette, Lola.

== Production ==
=== Development ===
After the sixth season finale of Agents of S.H.I.E.L.D. aired in August 2019, showrunners Jed Whedon, Maurissa Tancharoen, and Jeffrey Bell revealed that the seventh season would feature the team trying to save the world from invasion by the Chronicoms. They used time travel to do this, allowing the season to explore the history of S.H.I.E.L.D. Later that month, one of the season's episodes was revealed to be titled "The End Is at Hand" and written by Bell, while another was revealed to be titled "What We're Fighting For" and written by Whedon. The two were confirmed to be the twelfth and thirteenth episodes of the season, as well as the series finale, in August 2020. Chris Cheramie was revealed to have directed "The End Is at Hand", while Kevin Tancharoen was revealed to have directed "What We're Fighting For". "The End Is at Hand" was the first time Cheramie directed an episode of the series, after serving as its post-production producer throughout the series.

=== Writing ===
"What We're Fighting For" returns to the events of the season six finale, "New Life". Whedon stated the writers knew that the seventh season would deal with time travel, "so we planted little stuff that would be easily avoidable if we didn't end up tying up those loose ends." For example, the people in hazmat suits during that episode turn out to be members of the S.H.I.E.L.D. team who have returned from the alternate timeline. Whedon added figuring out how the events of the finale intersect with "New Life" became "a brain pretzel-twister". Ming-Na Wen had the idea for Melinda May to say "the Cavalry is here", because she wanted the character "to finally accept that nickname and all of her emotional baggage that she'd been carrying" surrounding it, and "revel in it as opposed to being afraid".

A bittersweet feeling for each character was used in the final scene, which was done to differentiate the ending from that of the season five finale "The End". At the time, "The End" had been crafted as a series finale, and Whedon noted it "had its own feeling and its own flavor, and we felt like we had done a pretty good job with that." Coming up with the episode's ending sequence "was just blue sky" for Whedon after the first part of the episode had "so many moving parts" to it. Whedon acknowledged it was "just fun to think about" as there were "tons of great options" for the ending, saying, "We sort of tried to put everybody in a different-feeling thing and in a different place and separate them as much as possible." Maurissa Tancharoen added, "The emotional context of saying goodbye to this experience...is definitely something that's reflected in where we leave our characters at the end of the show. So it is very personal to us, and I do think there's a sense of hope for what's to come for each of them." Having the characters appear virtually, which was thought of by series writers Nora and Lilla Zuckerman, did not break the established rule that the team would not be in the same room together after the final mission.

I do think the one-year jump serves to amplify that bittersweet quality, because we, as the audience, are aware that they've been in their new lives, separate from each other, for a year. They're established, they're starting to settle into it. But seeing them in that room, and then learning that it's a virtual room where they actually can't reach out and touch one another, or give each other a hug... I think in that feeling of longing for one another and that feeling of the loss of what once was—it really lands the bond that they will have forever, even if they won't be in each other's lives.

— Maurissa Tancharoen

The ending sees a one-year time jump with the S.H.I.E.L.D. team separated with new lives:

- Alphonso "Mack" Mackenzie is still a leader within S.H.I.E.L.D., supervising the construction of a new helicarrier, and Elena "Yo-Yo" Rodriguez as a S.H.I.E.L.D. agent chasing 0-8-4s. Tancharoen commented the two "are still together in a relationship and working with one another — and proud of one another. Yo-Yo actress Natalia Cordova-Buckley liked that the relationship had stabilized, with both being comfortable professionally, individually, and within their relationship.
- Leo Fitz and Jemma Simmons are retired, spending time with their daughter Alya. Whedon felt "for a long time, we had a sense that Fitz and Simmons would be sort of out of S.H.I.E.L.D. and living the simpler life — while secretly working with Daisy on the side". Simmons actress Elizabeth Henstridge called the couple's ending "definitely earned", while Fitz actor Iain De Caestecker felt this was "a fitting end but a beginning, of another life, as well."
- Melinda May has become an instructor at the Coulson S.H.I.E.L.D. academy, teaching Flint. This career "made perfect sense" to the writers, with Tancharoen adding, "all of that just sums up her relationship with Coulson [and her as] the reluctant teacher. She has always been the wise teacher amongst the group, the sort of mother figure". Wen called this ending for her character "very fitting" since she had been a superior officer to many of the members on the team and now can "continue the S.H.I.E.L.D. legacy for future S.H.I.E.L.D. agents."
- Daisy Johnson, her sister Kora, and Daniel Sousa work with S.H.I.E.L.D. aboard Zephyr Three as "astral ambassadors". Whedon said "it felt right" to have Daisy in space since "it feels vast, and we wanted someone to be out exploring that". Additionally, having Daisy work with Kora mimics how Coulson first helped Daisy.
- The Life Model Decoy of Phil Coulson has taken a sabbatical, seeing various parts of the world. He also receives a restored version of his 1962 Chevrolet Corvette, Lola, from Mack. Having Coulson getting in Lola was "the promise for him of a new adventure", and as the final shot of the series, was a "book end" that brought back "an iconic image from the pilot".
- Deke Shaw remains in 1983 in the altered timeline "to embrace his inner rock god" and become the new S.H.I.E.L.D. leader for the remaining agents. Bell said this was done so Deke's sacrifice would "make sense" for why it had to be him to stay behind. Actor Jeff Ward called using his rock persona to cover being the head of S.H.I.E.L.D. "the ultimate hiding-in-plain-sight tactic".

Ward revealed that series writer DJ Doyle had pitched a post-credits scene for the episode that was not shot, that featured someone approaching Deke sitting in a S.H.I.E.L.D. office wearing an eye patch. Ward added, since it was unclear if Nick Fury existed in the alternate timeline, Deke would have worn it because it is "a power and cool thing". The writers also considered showing a S.H.I.E.L.D. mission where Deke is performing "Money for Nothing" at Madison Square Garden.

=== Casting ===
With the season renewal, main cast members Ming-Na Wen, Chloe Bennet, Elizabeth Henstridge, Henry Simmons, Natalia Cordova-Buckley, and Jeff Ward were confirmed to be returning from previous seasons as Melinda May, Daisy Johnson / Quake, Jemma Simmons, Alphonso "Mack" Mackenzie, Elena "Yo-Yo" Rodriguez, and Deke Shaw, respectively. Series star Clark Gregg also returns as his character Phil Coulson, portraying a Life Model Decoy (LMD) version of the character.

Guest stars in the finale include Iain De Caestecker as Leo Fitz, and returning from earlier in the season, Tamara Taylor as Sibyl, Thomas E. Sullivan as Nathaniel Malick, Dianne Doan as Kora, and Enver Gjokaj reprising his Agent Carter role of Daniel Sousa. They are joined by Stephen Bishop as Brandon Gamble, and Rachele Schank as a young Victoria Hand.

Additional guest stars in "The End Is at Hand" include James Paxton as John Garrett and Bill Cobbs as an elderly S.H.I.E.L.D. agent. When writing the scene in which Cobbs appears, Bell asked for "somebody like Bill Cobbs" to play the part, and was later told they were able to hire him. For "What We're Fighting For", Joel Stoffer returns from earlier in the season as Enoch, and returning from earlier in the series, Briana Venskus as Agent Piper, Maximilian Osinski as an LMD of Agent Davis, and Coy Stewart as Flint. Harlow Happy Hexum portrays Alya, Fitz and Simmon's daughter.

=== Filming and post-production ===
To highlight the different dynamic between Nathaniel Malick and Sibyl, when together, Malick was shown moving around constantly "like a caged tiger", while Sibyl was more stoic, showing her "complete control". Bell stated the day Cobbs came to film his scene, "it was like Elvis was on set", with everyone being "so respectful". Cobbs arrived to set in a wheelchair and a modern-day walker, and director Chris Cheramie was afraid they would not be able to accommodate him with these devices, given his scene is set in the 1980s; a period appropriate walker was procured for him to use, though Cobbs chose not to use it.

The ending was not easy to shoot, according to director Kevin Tancharoen, because "everyone [on the crew] was emotionally invested" in the lines the actors were saying, and the tone they created on the set "made everyone sad". Filming wrapped on July 30, 2019.

Visual effects supervisor Mark Kolpack began working on some of the visual effects sequences in the final episode that would not need actors to be a part of weeks before anything had been filmed or the script had been written, in order to ensure what they wanted to accomplish could be completed on time. However, Kolpack and his team were working on the final four episodes of the season at once, and in order to meet the completion deadlines for the previous episodes, Kolpack requested an additional month to work on "What We're Fighting For" given the many visual effects in the episode. Visual effects for "What We're Fighting For" were completed on October 4, 2019, while the remaining post-production work was completed around October 7. 20 additional minutes of footage were cut from the episodes. While most were "unforgettable, humorous lines", some of the cut content was fight sequences and an origin scene in "The End Is at Hand" for the quantum machine. Regarding this cut content, Whedon said, "We really tried to preserve the end, and that end had to breathe, and have time to sit and be quiet and awkward... That was the thing that we tried most to preserve, and that's intact."

=== Music ===
Composer Bear McCreary appreciated the additional month gained in order to completed the episode's visual effects, as he was also realizing the large scope of the episode and would have asked for more time himself had it not already been granted for the visual effects to be completed. He said, "it was great because this episode just needed more across the board. We all got to have time to make sure we did our best work." McCreary attempted to give each character a musical send off in "What We're Fighting For". Writing the music for when Fitz and Simmons are reunited with their daughter was a stand out moment in the series for McCreary, one he said that "wrecked" him and would be a moment he would always remember. McCreary was "terrified" of approaching the ending, called it "a monster to score". He was unsure of how much music should be present, as he did not feel a lot of music was needed given what the actors were doing, yet it was the end of the episode and series. Instead of a steady build throughout the scene to the end, McCreary was "really surgical", building in moments that needed it, and then returning softer afterwards.

=== Marvel Cinematic Universe tie-ins ===
Fitz utilizes the Quantum Realm, seen in the Ant-Man films and Avengers: Endgame (2019), to travel to the altered timeline and reunite with the S.H.I.E.L.D. team before bringing everyone back to the main timeline. A line stating how the realm could be used to survive Thanos' snap, as seen in Avengers: Infinity War (2018) and Avengers: Endgame, was planned but ultimately cut.

== Release ==
"The End Is at Hand" and "What We're Fighting For" were first aired in the United States on ABC on August 12, 2020.

== Reception ==
=== Ratings ===
In the United States, "The End Is at Hand" and "What We're Fighting For" received a 0.3 percent share among adults between the ages of 18 and 49, meaning that they were seen by 0.3 percent of all households in that demographic. The two episodes were watched by 1.46 million viewers. Within a week of release, the series finale was watched by 2.46 million viewers.

=== Critical response ===
The A.V. Club's Alex McLevy said the finale "managed to deliver a spectacle truly worthy of its outsized ambitions". For "The End Is at Hand", he felt the episode was "the best-looking, most visually sumptuous episode of the season", particularly the hangar interior which felt "epic in scale and scope to the story being told". Each of the three storylines in the episode "adeptly balances action, humor, and heart, and allows for some meaningful discussions without feeling too much like it's hitting pause on all the high-intensity, clock-ticking action unfolding." As for the final scene in the bar, McLevy said having a young Victoria Hand and the 0-8-4s allowed "for a nice trip down memory lane, evoking memories of this show's infancy". He gave the episode an "A−". In "What We're Fighting For", McLevy enjoyed "how all-in this show went making a conclusion so proudly, unabashedly nerdy", and while the time-travel was the "most entertaining element" of the finale, it was "also the thing that causes it to be somewhat less impactful in its emotional resonance". He noted the episode featured "some exhilarating fight scenes and super-powered battles", particularly the Daisy and Nathaniel Malick fight, which is what many viewers "are hoping for when we sit down to watch a Marvel TV show". He felt the ending was "a surprisingly quiet, bittersweet note" that "is a little sad, a little funny, and feels over before it's really begun." Speaking more to the ending, McLevy said, "there's something almost more downbeat about an ending acknowledging the fact that even after world-altering events that forge permanent bonds, life just...goes on, in all its prosaic reality, the day-to-day intimacy that once existed an ever-more-distant memory." He gave "What We're Fighting For" a "B+".

Trent Moore at Syfy Wire felt "seeing Simmons process her scrambled memories and slowly remember her life, and Fitz, was some beautiful acting by Elizabeth Henstridge." Other enjoyable moments for Moore were Mack and Sousa creating the makeshift Chronicom missile with duct tape ("a great bit of classic, goofy S.H.I.E.L.D. weirdness") and Deke's fart noise interrupting Sousa to say he would stay behind. While Moore felt the final plan was "a bit convoluted and McGuffin-y", he realized the show went out on a big story to justify that. As for the ending, Moore said it mostly worked, adding, "It's hard to craft an ending, especially one with so many moving pieces and characters. But there's no doubt this is a good one. Fans should enjoy it, and most importantly it leaves the door open to where fans can imagine all the adventures and stories that could still spin out after the series has long-ended." Christian Holub, writing for Entertainment Weekly, called Garrett getting trapped at the Lighthouse "delicious" since Holub had found the character "quite insufferable". The fight between Daisy and Nathaniel Malick gave "some fun Dragon Ball Z vibes... but ultimately I feel like it pales in comparison to Daisy's climactic fight with Graviton from the end of season 5." As for the ending, Holub likened how the characters appeared virtually to a Zoom meeting and said "It's about as good an ending as you could hope for any of these characters — especially FitzSimmons!" Giving the finale a "B", he concluded, "despite my many qualms about this season, I think it did wrap up the show (which over seven seasons has spanned multiple eras of Marvel superhero fiction) in a nice little bow."

Reviewing the finale for Den of Geek, Dave Vitagliano gave the episode 4 out 5 stars. He said the finale "neatly ties up enough loose plot threads to keep even the staunchest critics happy and still leaves plenty of room for requisite fan service. Nevertheless, no one can accuse the writers of leaving any cards unplayed. The awakenings, the sacrifices, the reunions, and the redemptions were all completely earned and worthy of this final installment." The reunion of Fitz and Simmons was "one of the finale's highlights", and given the introduction of their daughter, Vitagliano felt it was "hard to be disappointed with the conclusion of their arc." Vitagliano felt the showrunners took "extra care" with the ending to satisfy the fans, with "the most poignant exchange" coming when Daisy and Coulson say goodbye. Dominic Patten of Deadline Hollywood called the finale "an ambitious and ultimately successful conclusion for the very first live action Marvel television series and its longtime motto that 'not all heroes are super'," adding the episodes felt like a feature film opposed to two episodes of television. CNN's Brian Lowry said the finale was "an old-fashioned affair tinged with nostalgia", aimed at those who had watched the series from the beginning. Regarding the ending scene, Lowry called it "inadvertently timely", also likening it to a Zoom call, and concluded, "While providing some closure, the finale left the door open to utilize some of these characters again, although given Marvel's priorities, that seems less likely."

Compared to some of the more extravagant elements that have occurred over the series, Collider's Liz Shannon Miller called the series finale "a pretty lowkey affair, focused far more on character than plot". She concluded, "Agents of S.H.I.E.L.D. was never perfect, but it was special, and the finale managed to nail the one thing we never remember about happy endings — no ending is happy forever. But that doesn't mean we shouldn't cherish the moments, while they last." Awarding the finale an 8 out of 10, Matt Fowler writing for IGN called both episodes "rollicking affairs filled with action, heart, and humor". As for the ending, he felt it highlighted "how little the rest of the season meant" in that "it didn't really matter, overall, who the villains were, or what the threat to the planet was. The series has been all about these characters for years now and the rest of it's just 'big bad' dressing."

=== Accolades ===
"What We're Fighting For" was nominated for Outstanding Achievement in Sound Editing – Episodic Short Form – Dialogue/ADR and Outstanding Achievement in Sound Editing – Episodic Short Form – Effects / Foley at the Golden Reel Awards 2020, losing to The Mandalorian episode "Chapter 13: The Jedi" in both categories.

Henstridge was named TVLine's "Performer of the Week" for the week of August 10, 2020, for her performance in these episodes. The site felt Henstridge "mined" Simmons' random memory revelations for moments of comedy, highlighting when the character asked Daisy for her own superhero costume, and once Simmons heard from Fitz they had been gone for a long time, the new questions she felt allowed Henstridge to show confusion and frustration that "began building to the emotional climax to come". Additionally, "Henstridge powerfully communicated the rush of feelings" Simmons felt once she fully remembered her daughter, as the audience was also learning the truth alongside her. In 2022, TVLine ranked the finale 29th on its list of the top 30 television finales.
