= Agents of S.H.I.E.L.D. season 7 =

Agents of S.H.I.E.L.D.
- Season 7
- Promotional poster
- Showrunners: Jed Whedon; Maurissa Tancharoen; Jeffrey Bell
- Starring: Clark Gregg; Ming-Na Wen; Chloe Bennet; Elizabeth Henstridge; Henry Simmons; Natalia Cordova-Buckley; Jeff Ward
- No. of episodes: 13

Release
- Original network: ABC
- Original release: May 27 – August 12, 2020

Season chronology
- ← Previous; Season 6

The seventh and final season of the American television series Agents of S.H.I.E.L.D., based on the Marvel Comics spy organization S.H.I.E.L.D., follows S.H.I.E.L.D. agents and allies as they try to prevent an alien occupation while stranded in time. It is set in the Marvel Cinematic Universe (MCU) and acknowledges the continuity of the franchise's films. The season was produced by ABC Studios, Marvel Television, and Mutant Enemy Productions, with Jed Whedon, Maurissa Tancharoen, and Jeffrey Bell serving as showrunners.

Clark Gregg stars as a Life Model Decoy of agent Phil Coulson, reprising his role from the film series, alongside returning series regulars Ming-Na Wen, Chloe Bennet, Elizabeth Henstridge, Henry Simmons, Natalia Cordova-Buckley, and Jeff Ward. Iain De Caestecker also appears in the season in a limited role. The final season was ordered in November 2018, ahead of the sixth season premiere, and filming took place from February to July 2019. Post-production work on the season was completed that October. The season uses time travel to explore the history of S.H.I.E.L.D., and to tie up threads left by previous seasons.

The seventh season premiered on ABC on May 27, 2020, and ran for 13 episodes until August 12, 2020. Though the season earned the series' lowest viewership, critical reception was positive. Critics commended the season's ability to explore different genres and settings through its time travel storyline and felt it served as a satisfactory conclusion for viewers, but were critical of the limited role Leo Fitz took in the season.

== Episodes ==
No. overall	No. in season	Title	Directed by	Written by	Original release date	U.S. viewers (millions)
124	1	"The New Deal"	Kevin Tancharoen	George Kitson	May 27, 2020	1.82
In 1931 New York City, several Chronicoms steal the faces of three police officers and kill a contact from a local speakeasy. S.H.I.E.L.D. agent Jemma Simmons introduces Director Alphonso "Mack" Mackenzie and agent Daisy Johnson to an Life Model Decoy (LMD) version of Phil Coulson, who struggles with his existence and the amount of information uploaded into him. Daisy and Deke Shaw investigate the faceless officers and are attacked by the Chronicoms, but they overpower one and take him back to the Zephyr. Coulson and Mack investigate the speakeasy and meet its owner, Ernest "Hazard" Koenig, who reveals that the police officers are providing security for a function in honor of Gov. Franklin D. Roosevelt. Simmons overloads the Chronicom's mind, forcing it to reveal their actual target: Koenig's employee Wilfred "Freddy" Malick, father of future Hydra leader Gideon Malick. The team rescues Freddy from the Chronicoms and realize they have to save Hydra to ensure S.H.I.E.L.D.'s future. On the Zephyr, the Chronicom Enoch, an ally of S.H.I.E.L.D., helps heal Agent Melinda May.
125	2	"Know Your Onions"	Eric Laneuville	Craig Titley	June 3, 2020	1.50
Deke and Mack promise to keep Freddy safe, traveling with him by train to make a delivery. The other agents regroup at Koenig's speakeasy and interrogate Freddy's contact, Viola; learning she is a Hydra agent and that Freddy is carrying what will become Hydra's super soldier serum. They return to the Zephyr, where Enoch attempts to prevent an erratic May from leaving the ship. Coulson stops her, but she reacts apathetically to his presence. Koenig helps direct the team to Freddy's delivery location, learning of S.H.I.E.L.D., Chronicoms, and time travel in the process. Daisy contacts Deke and tells him to kill Freddy to stop Hydra's rise, but Mack prevents this. Koenig tries to stop Freddy from making the delivery, but Freddy shoots him and leaves with a Hydra agent, securing their future. The Zephyr unexpectedly time travels to follow the Chronicoms through the next time window, leaving Enoch behind. Despite this, he is hired by the recovering Koenig and agrees to tell him more about S.H.I.E.L.D. and robotics.
126	3	"Alien Commies from the Future!"	Nina Lopez-Corrado	Nora Zuckerman & Lilla Zuckerman	June 10, 2020	1.57
The agents end up in 1955 near Area 51, a S.H.I.E.L.D. base currently working on Project Helius, an ion fusion reactor prototype. The agents kidnap high ranking agent Gerald Sharpe and have Coulson impersonate him while Simmons impersonates Peggy Carter so they can find the Chronicom infiltrators. However, they run into Carter's former partner Daniel Sousa, who outs them. Despite putting up resistance and his racism towards part of the team, Sharpe eventually reveals that Helius cannot function without a powerful energy source, leading Deke to deduce that the Chronicoms plan to sacrifice one of their own to activate the weapon and destroy the base. Daisy arrives undercover and convinces Sousa to release her teammates just as the undercover Chronicoms enact their plan. Daisy and Simmons improve a S.H.I.E.L.D. EMP device in time to disable Helius, along with the entire base, the Chronicoms, and Coulson. Mack and Deke return Sharpe to the desert and pose as aliens to avoid changing history.
127	4	"Out of the Past"	Garry A. Brown	Mark Leitner	June 17, 2020	1.40
Coulson wakes up in Sousa's custody with a system glitch that makes him see in black and white and hear an internal monologue (in the style of a film noir). He realizes that the current date is the day Sousa dies while delivering a device to Howard Stark. Coulson calls the Zephyr with the help of Enoch at the speakeasy. Elena "Yo-Yo" Rodriguez and Deke find the device, but the latter is captured by Hydra. He is taken to an older Wilfred Malick, who spares Deke's life since Deke spared his in 1931. Yo-Yo and Simmons discover that May experiences other people's emotions. Mack, Coulson, and Daisy realize that Sousa is killed by Hydra to prevent him from exposing their presence within S.H.I.E.L.D. They decide to change history and save Sousa; after he delivers the device, Coulson knocks Sousa unconscious and fakes his death. Sousa wakes up on the Zephyr and a repaired Coulson explains their situation. They travel forward in time again, while a Chronicom stays behind in 1955 and offers to help Malick.
128	5	"A Trout in the Milk"	Stan Brooks	Iden Baghdadchi	June 24, 2020	1.37
In 1973, the agents return to the speakeasy to discover that S.H.I.E.L.D. is preparing Project Insight, which should not be developed for several more decades, led by Wilfred Malick, who should have died in 1970. Wilfred and the Chronicoms attempt to capture the agents, but Daisy briefly takes his son Nathaniel (who also should be dead) hostage to allow their escape. Nathaniel sees Daisy use her powers. The agents reunite with Enoch and return to the Zephyr. Without warning, the Chronicoms jump forward to 1976 when Project Insight is set to launch, and the Zephyr follows. Coulson and May plant explosives in the Lighthouse where Insight is being launched while Deke and Yo-Yo confront Wilfred, who is killed by Deke. Daisy and Sousa are captured by Nathaniel. Mack aborts the detonation when he sees his parents, John and Lilla, are being held captive, allowing Insight to launch. The agents use the Zephyr to destroy Insight, giving away their location. Nathaniel attempts to call Daniel Whitehall to transfer Daisy's powers to himself.
129	6	"Adapt or Die"	Aprill Winney	DJ Doyle	July 1, 2020	1.32
The Lighthouse automatically fires missiles at the Zephyr, damaging the time drive. While Deke, Simmons, and Enoch repair it, Deke discovers that Simmons has a memory implant that blocks her knowledge of Leo Fitz's location while retaining information on time travel. Nathaniel experiments on Daisy and transfers her powers to himself, but he is overwhelmed by them as they destroy the building he is in, allowing Sousa to get Daisy back to the Zephyr. May uses her powers to identify undercover Chronicoms while she and Coulson rescue General Rick Stoner, and Coulson finds the Chronicoms' ship. He speaks with their predictor, Sibyl, before blowing up the ship with himself and many of the Chronicoms in it. Mack and Yo-Yo discover that Mack's parents are already dead and being impersonated by Chronicoms, forcing Mack to throw them from the Quinjet. The Zephyr jumps to 1982, and Mack steps out to mourn. Deke checks on him, but they are stranded when the Zephyr suddenly jumps through time.
130	7	"The Totally Excellent Adventures of Mack and The D"	Jesse Bochco	Brent Fletcher	July 8, 2020	1.39
Stuck in 1982, a despondent Mack spends the next year alone in grief. Deke checks in on Mack occasionally, and eventually convinces him to come see Deke's new band, The Deke Squad, which include Olga Pachinko, Roxy Glass, Cricket and twins Ronnie and Tommy Chang, which performs 80s' classics that have not been written yet. Deke reveals that he has secretly been training the members of the band to be S.H.I.E.L.D. agents, and that Coulson's consciousness has been saved on a hard drive. Meanwhile, Sibyl's consciousness also survived, and she uses a lonely programmer to construct a crude body for herself. She then creates new "hunter" robots that kill the programmer before invading the Lighthouse in search of the time stream that Sibyl uses to predict the future. Mack helps Deke and the new agents defeat the hunters, unaware that a small robot escaped with the time stream. The Zephyr re-appears long enough for May and Yo-Yo to reunite with Mack and Deke. The latter recounts the past year's events to May. The small robot takes the time stream to Nathaniel, who survived the collapse and is now working with Sibyl.
131	8	"After, Before"	Eli Gonda	James C. Oliver & Sharla Oliver	July 15, 2020	1.38
After rescuing Mack, Deke, and Coulson, Simmons informs the team that the time drive keeps jumping them forward by less time until it will eventually collapse on them. Needing Yo-Yo's currently inactive powers to deactivate it, Daisy suggests stopping by Afterlife to get help from her mother Jiaying. Yo-Yo and May arrive to discover that Jiaying is in the process of helping a despondent Inhuman named Kora with her volatile energy powers. After examining Yo-Yo, Jiaying comes to the conclusion that her problems are mental rather than physical and has May use her empath abilities on her. Yo-Yo reveals that she witnessed the death of her uncle and has since blamed herself for it. Nathaniel arrives and recruits Kora in taking over Afterlife. Yo-Yo, May, Jiaying, and young Inhuman Gordon are forced to flee. Upon arriving back at the Zephyr, Yo-Yo realizes that she has been holding herself back and successfully deactivates the time drive. As the crew settles in, the time drive suddenly starts up, causing the Zephyr to unexpectedly jump again.
132	9	"As I Have Always Been"	Elizabeth Henstridge	Drew Z. Greenberg	July 22, 2020	1.28
The Zephyr gets trapped in a time vortex as Daisy wakes up from her cryo-chamber. After witnessing several events happen, time suddenly restarts and she realizes that she is trapped in a time loop as the Zephyr gets closer to the center of the vortex with every passing loop. She learns that Coulson is also aware and has been in the loop longer, though Daisy forgets everything when she dies. Daisy and Coulson learn about Simmons' memory implant, but when they try to remove it, a freak accident kills her. The deaths appear to be orchestrated and Coulson concludes that Enoch, who was programmed to protect Simmons' implant, has been unwillingly killing them. After several failed attempts, they eventually manage to remove the implant and Simmons informs them that Enoch's power mechanism can fix the time drive, though at the cost of his life. In the final loop, Enoch willingly gives up his mechanism and dies, but not before revealing to Daisy that this will be their final mission as a team. Meanwhile, Nathaniel helps Kora control her powers.
133	10	"Stolen"	Garry A. Brown	Story by : Mark Linehan Bruner; Teleplay by : George Kitson & Mark Leitner	July 29, 2020	1.30
Nathaniel recruits a young John Garrett, who turned against S.H.I.E.L.D. and was killed by Coulson in the original timeline. Nathaniel shows him this future while perfecting a way to transfer Inhuman powers to his men. S.H.I.E.L.D. keeps Jiaying at the Lighthouse for protection. Daisy learns that Kora is her half-sister, who died before Daisy was born in the original timeline. She spends time with Jiaying but does not tell her that she is her daughter. Coulson and Gordon teleport into Afterlife, but Nathaniel anticipates this and captures them. He transfers Gordon's powers to Garrett, killing the former in the process. Garrett teleports Nathaniel to the Lighthouse, while Yo-Yo and Mack rescue the captive Inhumans and Coulson. The latter takes Kora captive. Nathaniel reveals to Jiaying that Daisy is her daughter, before killing Jiaying and fleeing. Garrett kidnaps Simmons as he and Nathaniel steal the Zephyr, unaware that Deke is still aboard. Nathaniel explains his plan to have Simmons tell them where Fitz is, as he is the only one who can stop them.
134	11	"Brand New Day"	Keith Potter	Chris Freyer	August 5, 2020	1.25
Kora claims that she wants to work with S.H.I.E.L.D., despite the agents deducing that she has ulterior motives. Knowing that Sibyl is aware of their every move, Daisy, Sousa and Mack decide to act unpredictably and take a quinjet to follow Nathaniel and the Zephyr into space. Nathaniel attempts to glean information from Simmons by using Deke as leverage, but is unable to find Fitz's location in her memories. His actions cause Simmons to forget who Fitz is completely. May interrogates Kora, who shuts down the Lighthouse's power, allowing Sibyl to hack into the mainframe. Coulson realizes that he can read the computer code that she is using and tries to shut her out. Kora suggests using their future knowledge to go after those who deserve to be killed, but May shows her Jiaying's body and she lashes out, only to be teleported by Garrett back to the Zephyr. Daisy, Sousa, and Mack watch as a Chronicom fleet arrives to meet the Zephyr. The Chronicoms use the information that Sibyl stole to destroy S.H.I.E.L.D.'s facilities around the world.
135	12	"The End Is at Hand"	Chris Cheramie	Jeffrey Bell	August 12, 2020	1.46
Upon landing on the Chronicom ship, Daisy searches for Deke and Simmons while Sousa and Mack fend off a group of Chronicom soldiers. Sibyl plans for Daisy to find Simmons to jog her memory, but an impatient Nathaniel has Kora confront them. Daisy talks Kora down and she lets them escape, forcing Nathaniel to knock her out. The agents return to the Zephyr and escape the ship. With the Lighthouse the only S.H.I.E.L.D. base still standing, Garrett plants bombs to destroy it, but Coulson, Yo-Yo, and May capture him and neutralize his powers. When they force Garrett to stop the explosion, Nathaniel leaves Garrett to die, but they all manage to survive. Garrett decides to join the agents and teleport them to the speakeasy, only to be killed by other agents who arrived there to hide. Everyone regroups and, with Simmons' help, create a "key" that she was struggling to remember. The key opens a portal that brings Fitz to them, but he is disappointed to learn Simmons does not remember him.
136	13	"What We're Fighting For"	Kevin Tancharoen	Jed Whedon	August 12, 2020	1.46
Fitz explains that he has traveled from their original timeline to this new one using the Quantum Realm. Deke decides to remain in the new timeline to help send the others and the Chronicoms back to the original one, becoming the new leader of S.H.I.E.L.D. When they arrive back in the original timeline, Fitz helps Simmons remember him and the life they lived while they were building the time machine, including their daughter Alya. Coulson, May, Mack, and Daisy infiltrate the Chronicoms' ship to rescue Kora and confront Nathaniel, who transferred Kora's powers to himself. May and Kora combine their abilities to give empathy to the Chronicoms, ending their assault. Daisy fights Nathaniel before destroying the Chronicoms' ships, killing him and Sibyl. The agents find Daisy in space, and Kora revives her. One year later, Fitz and Simmons have retired to raise Alya; May is a professor at S.H.I.E.L.D.'s Coulson Academy; Mack continues to lead S.H.I.E.L.D., with Yo-Yo as one of his top agents; Daisy is exploring the cosmos with Sousa and Kora; and Coulson decides to travel the world.

== Cast and characters ==
=== Main ===
- Clark Gregg as Phil Coulson
- Ming-Na Wen as Melinda May
- Chloe Bennet as Daisy Johnson / Quake
- Elizabeth Henstridge as Jemma Simmons
- Henry Simmons as Alphonso "Mack" Mackenzie
- Natalia Cordova-Buckley as Elena "Yo-Yo" Rodriguez
- Jeff Ward as Deke Shaw

=== Recurring ===
- Joel Stoffer as Enoch
- Tobias Jelinek as Luke
- Darren Barnet and Neal Bledsoe as Wilfred Malick
- Enver Gjokaj as Daniel Sousa
- Tamara Taylor as Sibyl
- Thomas E. Sullivan as Nathaniel Malick
- Dianne Doan as Kora

=== Notable guests ===
- Patton Oswalt as Ernest "Hazard" Koenig
- Cameron Palatas as Gideon Malick
- Patrick Warburton as Rick Stoner
- Dichen Lachman as Jiaying
- Fin Argus as Gordon
- James Paxton as John Garrett
- Iain De Caestecker as Leo Fitz
- Rachele Schank as Victoria Hand
- Briana Venskus as Piper
- Maximilian Osinski as Davis
- Coy Stewart as Flint

== Production ==
=== Development ===
In November 2018, ahead of the release of its sixth season, ABC renewed Agents of S.H.I.E.L.D. for a seventh. This early renewal was a surprise following the series' low rated fifth season, but Deadline Hollywood reported that it was likely due to the cast's contract negotiations and would help reduce costs by filming the sixth and seventh seasons back-to-back. Marvel Television head Jeph Loeb said the series' crew had expected the shorter sixth season to be its last and were also surprised by the seventh season renewal. He attributed the decision to ABC watching early work on season six and believing the crew had found "another wave of energy" that they wanted to see continue.

Responding to new rumors in March 2019 that the series would end with its seventh season, Loeb stated, "We're not ending." However, ahead of the series' San Diego Comic-Con panel in July 2019, Loeb announced that the seventh season would be the series' last. He explained that the cast and crew had originally expected the series to end with the fifth season, and had put other plans on hold to make the sixth. When ABC wanted to renew the series for a seventh season, they agreed to return if it could be the final season. Having this knowledge allowed them to build the season specifically to "tie up any threads" and try to create a satisfying conclusion to the story. Although each episode of the season was allocated the same budget by ABC, the producers worked with the network to reallocate the budget across the season, to have the "backlot period costumes, which energized everybody and got everyone really excited" for the early episodes, and to save enough for the final episodes so the series could "go out with some scope and style".

=== Writing ===
Showrunners Jed Whedon, Maurissa Tancharoen, and Jeffrey Bell, as well as the series' writers, chose to use time travel in the final season because visiting earlier time periods was the "only thing left on the list" for them and it allowed them to explore the history of S.H.I.E.L.D. and revisit elements from throughout the series. The writers looked at other films and television series that have used time travel to see where they went wrong, and over or under explained concepts. They hoped to make a cohesive narrative for the season that was a "love poem" to the series and the fans. The story picks up from the sixth season's cliffhanger ending, which the writers were able to plan since the seventh season was ordered while they were working on the sixth. It features the team trying to save the world from invasion by the Chronicoms, a recurring subplot in the sixth season. The seventh season begins in 1930s New York, prior to the formation of S.H.I.E.L.D., before exploring more time periods, such as the 1950s and 1980s. Unlike earlier seasons, the seventh is not broken up into different "pods" due to its shorter 13-episode run. The writers tried to create more episodes in the season that were "outside of [their] normal form of storytelling", like the third season episode "4,722 Hours". Whedon felt that the season ended up using more of the writers' fun pitches that previously would have been dismissed, with Bell feeling the season was "more joyous" than in past seasons.

Phil Coulson is a Life Model Decoy (LMD) in the season after the events at the end of season six, despite star Clark Gregg explaining that the actual Coulson never wanted to be turned into an LMD. Gregg did not want the character to become similar to Data from Star Trek, "the cyber being following [the team] around doing fast math". The writers found a different way to approach the character while still addressing "some of the stuff that classic AI characters have dealt with in the past", such as questioning his feelings and existence. Whedon added that the Coulson LMD "feels the same" as the actual Coulson, and he goes through "some virtual soul-searching" according to Gregg. Chloe Bennet said much of the season references back to the first season and the notion that "not all heroes are super". Bennet added that Daisy Johnson is more like her Skye personality in the season now she is "more comfortable with who she is ... what she wants to do is be with the people that she loves and cares about, and save the world". Daniel Sousa becomes a love interest for Daisy in the season. Fulfilling the promise the writers had to give Daisy a love interest each season, they felt Sousa as a "man out of time" would work. Bennet was "hesitant" for her character to get another love interest, feeling her journey throughout the season was "about finding herself" and exploring her relationship with Coulson and her S.H.I.E.L.D. family. Yet, Sousa arrives and complements Daisy "in a way that she's completely taken off guard by", which Bennet felt was the only way a relationship would happen for Daisy. Sousa also forms a friendship with Alphonso "Mack" Mackenzie.

Natalia Cordova-Buckley said in the season, Elena "Yo-Yo" Rodriguez "sits back and becomes a team member", supporting Director Mack. Rodriguez has less of a personal struggle in the season than in the past "because she owns who she is and she's now decided to be part of the force, as a unit and not as an individual". Regarding her relationship with Mack, Cordova-Buckley said the season would show "the true conclusion of their relationship, in terms of it getting really rooted and grounded". Through Deke Shaw, a man out of time, the series was able to address the various social and racial issues in the different time periods the team visits, such as him "understanding or coming to terms with the concept of white privilege or pointing out how absurd it is that there is any sort of inequality or racial inequality". The absence of Leo Fitz for much of the season allowed the writers to bring Jemma Simmons and her grandson Deke Shaw closer together. The season was built with the character's absence in mind, and the time-travel story meant no time would have passed for the character when he returns. Fitz's absence also "made the eventual payoff all the more powerful", as it is revealed he and Simmons have a daughter. Whedon said "we did what we could, and we tried to make it rewarding with the pieces [we were given]. Sometimes it's 3D chess", continuing that the solution was to give the couple a "super-happy ending". The writers were always going to give Fitz and Simmons a happy ending, despite the many obstacles the couple faced throughout the series, since they were the series' "forever love". The happy ending was "a way to give the audience something that they wanted" as well.

Tancharoen said they "had no idea" the ending of the series, in which the S.H.I.E.L.D. team virtually reconnect with each other, was "predicting the near future" of Zoom calls and social distancing, which came about because of the COVID-19 pandemic. Whedon added that had the season been in development during the pandemic, a virus storyline would have been included and the season would have had a different tone.

=== Casting ===
With the season renewal, main cast members Ming-Na Wen, Chloe Bennet, Iain De Caestecker, Elizabeth Henstridge, Henry Simmons, Natalia Cordova-Buckley, and Jeff Ward were confirmed to be returning from previous seasons as Melinda May, Daisy Johnson / Quake, Leo Fitz, Jemma Simmons, Alphonso "Mack" Mackenzie, Elena "Yo-Yo" Rodriguez, and Deke Shaw, respectively. The renewal did not include series' star Clark Gregg, but Jed Whedon stated in April 2019 that the producers "firmly believe that any season would have to have him in it". The end of the sixth season revealed that a Life Model Decoy of Phil Coulson would appear in the seventh season, with Gregg starring as the new version of his character. This was the writers' solution to wanting to bring the character back without reversing the stakes of his death after the fifth season.

Despite being announced as a main cast member for the season, De Caestecker does not appear in the first ten episodes, as he was committed to other projects, creating scheduling conflicts. Whedon stated the choice was De Caestecker's, with Tancharoen adding "it was time for him to go [and] explore new things". He first appears in flashback sequences in "Brand New Day". De Caestecker received special guest star credit for his appearances in the season.

Joel Stoffer returns from past seasons in the recurring role of Enoch, a Chronicom ally of S.H.I.E.L.D., while Tobias Jelinek appears as antagonistic Chronicom Luke, and Tamara Taylor portrays the Chronicom predictor Sibyl. The seventh season introduces the character Wilfred "Freddy" Malick, father of Gideon Malick who appeared in the third season. Wilfred is portrayed by Darren Barnet in 1931 and Neal Bledsoe beginning in 1955. Cameron Palatas reprises his role as a young Gideon Malick from the third season, while Thomas E. Sullivan takes on the role of Wilfred's other son Nathaniel, who was portrayed by Joel Dabney Courtney in the third season. In August 2019, Hayley Atwell was reported to be reprising her role as Peggy Carter alongside Enver Gjokaj as agent Daniel Sousa from the series Agent Carter (2015–2016). Atwell later denied that she was involved with the final season, while Gjokaj's casting was confirmed in April 2020. Whedon and Tancharoen had previously worked with Gjokaj on Dollhouse (2009–2010) and were excited to explore his character further on Agents of S.H.I.E.L.D. Bell said Sousa would be seen in a "different light" in the season. Whedon added that having Sousa allows Coulson, a "fanboy for S.H.I.E.L.D. history", to interact with that history. Gjokaj initially said he was uncertain how long his commitment for the season would be, saying he was being used "on an episode-by-episode basis". He ultimately appears in 10 episodes in the season, and Bell later stated that it was the producer's plan to make it appear that Gjokaj would only feature in one episode of the season in order to "surprise people" when he had a recurring role. Additionally, Dianne Doan recurs as Kora, Daisy's half-sister.

In August 2019, Patrick Warburton was revealed to be reprising his season five role of Rick Stoner for the final season, and Patton Oswalt was revealed to be returning for the season in May 2020, portraying Ernest "Hazard" Koenig in 1931. He is the ancestor of the various present-day Koenig siblings that Oswalt portrayed in previous seasons. Dichen Lachman also reprises her season two role as Daisy's mother Jiaying, while Fin Argus plays a young version of Gordon, an Inhuman working with Jiaying. Philip Labe portrayed young Gordon in the second season, while Jamie Harris portrayed him as an adult. In July 2020, Gregg discussed actors that he wished could return for the seventh season, including Bill Paxton who portrayed John Garrett in the series' first season before his death in February 2017. Gregg said it would be "really amazing if there was some way to feel like we had the spirit of Bill Paxton with us" and teased that could happen in the season. Later that month, Paxton's son James Paxton was revealed to be guest starring in the season as a younger version of John Garrett. Briana Venskus, Maximilian Osinski, and Coy Stewart reprise their roles from previous seasons, respectively as Piper, Davis, and Flint, in the series finale. Rachele Schank also appears as a young Victoria Hand, a S.H.I.E.L.D. agent, who was portrayed in the first season by Saffron Burrows.

=== Design ===
==== Costumes ====
Costume designer Whitney Galitz was joined by Jessica Torok during the season, before Torok took over after Galitz left the series to give birth to her daughter.

==== Title sequence ====
Nearly every episode features title cards reflective of the time period visited throughout the season. The first two episodes, "The New Deal" and "Know Your Onions", have an "old-style noir" title card reflecting the 1930s setting of the episodes, while the third episode features a title card with font that "appears to be lifted from a classic alien invasion movie", evoking the style of 1950s "classic sci-fi". The fourth episode, again set in the 1950s, has a film noir style, including being in black and white and featuring an opening sequence that is an homage to Sunset Boulevard's (1950) "iconic" opening. The episode's title card is a "throwback-style credit intro". For "A Trout in the Milk", a 1970s-themed opening was used, and was the first opening sequence of the series to include "actual opening credits" along with voiceover introductions. Each actor's name featured clips of their character from past seasons. The seventh episode sees "Marvel's Agents of S.H.I.E.L.D." being typed on a black computer screen, referencing the "tech and hacker movies" of the 1980s. "After, Before" introduces an opening sequence the evokes Tron (1982) and Back to the Future (1985). The bright blue logo "travels across a black digital landscape made up of an orange and blue grid" which features coordinates, dates, and ticking clocks.

=== Filming ===
Production for the season began at the end of February 2019, in Culver City, California. Elizabeth Henstridge made her directorial debut with the episode "As I Have Always Been", which she said was "different than anything [the series has] done before", resulting in it being shot "in a whole new way". Filming wrapped on July 30, 2019. Post-production work on the final episode was completed around October 7, 2019.

=== Music ===
After contributing additional music to earlier seasons, Jason Akers is credited as co-composer for the seventh season alongside the series' original composer Bear McCreary. McCreary said Akers "knew the show like an encyclopedia", and added that he was grateful that he decided to promote Akers as co-composer because of the many "creative and logistical challenges" that the pair faced during the season. The composers introduced a new time travel theme in the season that uses 5/4 time. It was created to be a "consistent and memorable" through line for all the various musical genres featured in the season, which include "1940s noire saxophones, 1950s theremin, 1970s wah-wah guitar and bongos, and 1980s synths". The two composers worked to blend each of these different styles with the series' "pre-established classic orchestra and contemporary electronics".

=== Marvel Cinematic Universe tie-ins ===
In August 2019, Whedon and Tancharoen indicated that there would be a connection to the MCU in the final season. The various time periods visited in the season allowed the writers to incorporate different Marvel-related Easter eggs. In the third episode, which features Daniel Sousa, references are made to the second season of Agent Carter, including the defeat of Hugh Jones and the Council of Nine. There was a discussion to retcon Officer Saunders, a character Gjokaj played in The Avengers, into Sousa by having Sousa time travel back to the Battle of New York and going undercover as a cop, but the idea was dropped due to conflicts with the established timeline. The fifth episode depicts "Project Insight", a major plot point in Captain America: The Winter Soldier (2014), as taking place in the 1970s due to the Chronicoms changing history.

Instead of using the Quantum Realm to travel between different points in time as depicted in Avengers: Endgame (2019), the characters initially follow the Chronicoms through "tides", which are "critical launch windows leading to specific points in time and space". Discussing the apparent inconsistencies with Endgame earlier in the season, Thomas Bacon from Screen Rant noted that the time travel rules in the film were changed during production and were not completely consistent within that film, and opined that the series' explanation could help clarify the film's rules. Bacon suggested that the film's explanation that changing the past cannot change the future aligned with the series' idea that small ripples in the timestream would not change the overall flow of time, while the film's statement that removing the Infinity Stones from the timeline would create alternate realities with significant changes aligned with the series' idea that large changes would create a different future. As the season progresses, the S.H.I.E.L.D. team and the Chronicoms ultimately alter events in the past, creating a new timeline. After doing so, the team tries to ensure events in this new timeline happen correctly, such as protecting Jiaying from Nathaniel Malick to ensure Daisy is born. Jamie Jirak at ComicBook.com felt this was consistent with Endgame's time travel rules. In the season finale, Fitz confirms that the team was operating in a branched timeline and helped them return to the original timeline by traveling through the Quantum Realm.

== Marketing ==
The first footage of the season was released in August 2019 at the D23 Expo. A new teaser and poster for the season were released to coincide with the season's premiere date announcement in mid-April 2020, with the poster featuring an "old-school" 1950s S.H.I.E.L.D. logo due to the season returning to that era via time travel. A week later, the main poster for the season was released featuring art by Kyle Lambert. The poster depicts the season's main cast members in costumes from the different time periods that are visited throughout the season, with Marvel specifically asking Lambert to reflect the costumes and sets that were created for the series. The poster marketed the season as "The Final Mission". Jake Abbate at SuperHeroHype and Sam Stone of Comic Book Resources both compared the poster to the work of movie poster artist Drew Struzan.

== Release ==
=== Broadcast ===
The seventh season began airing on ABC in the United States on May 27, 2020, and ran for 13 episodes, until August 12, 2020. In the United Kingdom, E4, which had aired the series since season three, announced they had no plans to air season seven. The season was instead released on Disney+, starting with the first two episodes on November 13, 2020, and the remaining episodes following weekly.

=== Home media ===
The season began streaming on Netflix in the United States on October 30, 2020, and was available until February 28, 2022. It became available on Disney+ in the United States on March 16, 2022, joining other territories where it was already available on the service.

== Reception ==
=== Ratings ===
Viewership and ratings per episode of Agents of S.H.I.E.L.D. season 7
No.	Title	Air date	Rating (18–49)	Viewers (millions)	DVR (18–49)	DVR viewers (millions)	Total (18–49)	Total viewers (millions)
1	"The New Deal"	May 27, 2020	0.3	1.82	0.3	1.15	0.6	2.97
2	"Know Your Onions"	June 3, 2020	0.3	1.50	0.3	1.03	0.6	2.53
3	"Alien Commies from the Future!"	June 10, 2020	0.3	1.57	0.3	1.09	0.6	2.66
4	"Out of the Past"	June 17, 2020	0.3	1.40	0.3	1.07	0.6	2.47
5	"A Trout in the Milk"	June 24, 2020	0.2	1.37	0.3	1.05	0.5	2.42
6	"Adapt or Die"	July 1, 2020	0.3	1.32	0.3	1.06	0.6	2.38
7	"The Totally Excellent Adventures of Mack and The D"	July 8, 2020	0.3	1.39	0.3	1.05	0.6	2.44
8	"After, Before"	July 15, 2020	0.3	1.38	0.3	1.08	0.6	2.46
9	"As I Have Always Been"	July 22, 2020	0.3	1.28	0.3	1.07	0.6	2.35
10	"Stolen"	July 29, 2020	0.3	1.30	0.3	1.01	0.6	2.32
11	"Brand New Day"	August 5, 2020	0.3	1.25	0.3	1.09	0.6	2.34
12	"The End Is at Hand"	August 12, 2020	0.3	1.46	0.3	1.00	0.6	2.46
13	"What We're Fighting For"	August 12, 2020	0.3	1.46	0.3	1.00	0.6	2.46

=== Critical response ===
The review aggregator website Rotten Tomatoes reports a 100% approval rating, with an average score of 8/10, based on 15 reviews. The website's consensus reads, "Heartfelt and held together by the strength of its super cast's chemistry, Agents of S.H.I.E.L.D.'s final season is a fitting farewell to a beloved team."

Alex McLevy of The A.V. Club felt the season was giving off "strong Legends of Tomorrow vibes", saying, "The rollicking nature of its time-travel adventures, fused with a slightly more absurdist sensibility than past seasons, is giving these episodes the feel of a victory lap, the show loosening up and enjoying its high-concept potential without the worry of delivering the goods to ensure another year." Ian Cardona of Comic Book Resources felt by having Coulson return (albeit as an LMD) and once again utilizing Hydra as an antagonist brought the series "back-to-basics" while still maintaining the fun nature of the series. Each member of the team was allowed "to shine" and "the focus is solely on the characters and the mission, which helps to create a tightly-knit adventure that doesn't waste any time". Dave Vitagliano from Den of Geek said, "Even though season seven doesn't rank among the series' best efforts, taken as a whole, Agents of S.H.I.E.L.D. ends its 136-episode run as one of the most successful science fiction superhero television offerings and earns top grades overall."

Writing for io9, Rob Bricken felt by following Avengers: Endgame, which used time travel to adjust and determine the continuity of the MCU, allowed the season to benefit from Endgame's "decision to free the MCU from the shackles of continuity. The show has been able to go through its Legends of Tomorrow-esque jaunt through the 20th century with the freedom to tell whatever story it wants and leave as many chronal messes as that story needs", making the season "become as good and fun as the show's ever been". Bricken concluded that the time travel of the season could have looked "very different" had Endgame not done it first, since "Disney, ABC, and Marvel Studios wouldn't have approved anything that even appeared like the TV series was having some effect on the MCU proper, no matter how minor". Given the impact the COVID-19 pandemic had on delaying the start of Marvel Studios' Phase Four out of 2020, Ani Bundel of Collider called the season "Marvel's best release of 2020", despite being treated "as an afterthought". Bundel added it was "remarkable" the season was able to succeed in acknowledging elements from seasons past without leaving anything out, and felt the including Sousa was a successful tribute to Agent Carter. Bundel concluded the season "happily stepped up to fulfill fans' expectations, just as it has tirelessly for years. It's a triumphant ending for a series everyone wrote off at one point or another."

==== Absence of Fitz ====
Fitz does not appear in the season until the eleventh episode, due to De Caestecker committing to another project when the season started filming. Ian Sandwell at Digital Spy felt it was "a mistake" to have Fitz and Simmons apart, with it feeling "as though Fitz is missing because it's what the show does – and not because it's a necessary story mechanic". Sandwell felt with the couple separated, as a "key element" of the series, it was hard for the final season to be the "victory lap and celebration" it should. After the fifth episode of the season, McLevy said "the show better start paying dividends... on [the FitzSimmons] story, because it has cut its own legs out from underneath by dragging out Fitz's absence this long". While sympathetic to De Caestecker taking time to work on other projects, McLevy called the extended absence "ridiculous" at the halfway point of the season, since Fitz's absence "isn't making for great drama any more... By trying to have its keep-the-best-couple-apart cake and eat its mysterious-transformation too, Agents of S.H.I.E.L.D. lessens the impact of both. Right now, it's just [Jemma Simmons] failing to express any concern for the biggest person in her life, and without revealing the causes for that, the storyline gradually deflates from the delay." McLevy later added the "couple was the biggest emotional investment the show ever created, and they've just sputtered it out in the final two seasons". Syfy Wire's Trent Moore stated it was "impossible to overestimate how much [Fitz's] presence has been missed this year". On the prospect of potentially seeing Fitz in the eleventh episode, Entertainment Weekly's Christan Houlb said, "this better be one of the greatest plot twists of all time to justify leaving one of the show's central characters out of the entire final season and crippling the show's most compelling relationship in the process".

=== Accolades ===
Year	Award	Category	Nominee(s)	Result	Ref.
2021	Golden Reel Awards	Outstanding Achievement in Sound Editing – Episodic Short Form – Dialogue/ADR	"What We're Fighting For"	Nominated	
2021	Golden Reel Awards	Outstanding Achievement in Sound Editing – Episodic Short Form – Effects / Foley	"What We're Fighting For"	Nominated	

In July 2020, TVLine listed Agents of S.H.I.E.L.D. as one of the 15 best television series of 2020 so far, explaining that "expectations were measured" for the seventh season but it had proven itself to be "downright fantastic, totally fun and, with each passing episode, an affirmation of" the series' place within the wider MCU.
