= Leo Fitz =

Agents of S.H.I.E.L.D. character

- Marvel Cinematic Universe and Marvel Comics character
- Iain De Caestecker as Leo Fitz in a promotional image for season four.
- First appearance: "Pilot"; Agents of S.H.I.E.L.D.; September 24, 2013
- Last appearance: "What We're Fighting For"; Agents of S.H.I.E.L.D.; August 12, 2020
- Created by: Joss Whedon; Jed Whedon; Maurissa Tancharoen
- Portrayed by: Iain De Caestecker

In-universe information
- Full name: Leopold James Fitz
- Alias: The Doctor
- Nickname: FitzSimmons (with Jemma Simmons)
- Occupation: Engineer; S.H.I.E.L.D. agent; Director of Hydra (Framework)
- Family: Alistair Fitz (father); Owen Shaw (son-in-law); Deke Shaw (grandson)
- Spouse: Jemma Simmons (wife)
- Children: Alya Fitz
- Nationality: British(Scottish)

Leopold James "Leo" Fitz is a fictional character that originated in the Marvel Cinematic Universe before appearing in American comic books published by Marvel Comics. The character, created by Joss Whedon, Jed Whedon and Maurissa Tancharoen, first appeared in the pilot episode of Agents of S.H.I.E.L.D. in September 2013, and has continually been portrayed by Iain De Caestecker.

In the series, Fitz is one of S.H.I.E.L.D.'s top scientific minds. His scientific knowledge is vast, and as an engineer and inventor he has developed many of S.H.I.E.L.D.'s staple devices and gadgets. Many of his storylines involve his relationship with his best friend, and later wife, Jemma Simmons, who are collectively known as Fitzsimmons. Over the course of the series, Fitz suffers multiple traumas and becomes aware of a darker and more ruthless side to his character. His darker alter ego is commonly known as The Doctor.

== Fictional character biography ==
In season one, Leo Fitz is brought on to S.H.I.E.L.D. agent Phil Coulson's team as an engineering and weapons technology specialist. He has a close bond with fellow agent Jemma Simmons, whom he met at the S.H.I.E.L.D. academy, with both being its Science and Technology division's youngest graduates. Near the end of the season, Fitz and Simmons lock themselves inside a medical unit for safety from rogue agent Grant Ward, who ejects the unit into the ocean. While trapped, Fitz professes his feelings for Simmons before sacrificing himself to save her. They are rescued by Nick Fury, but Fitz sustains damage to his temporal lobe as a result of oxygen deprivation and is left comatose.

In season two, Fitz initially struggles with technology and speech as a result of Ward's actions, but over time becomes a full member of the team again. Near the end of the season Fitz arranges for a date with Simmons when the Kree weapon called "Monolith", which is in S.H.I.E.L.D. custody, breaks free of containment and absorbs Simmons into itself.

In season three, Fitz acquires an ancient Hebrew scroll describing the Monolith that consumed Simmons as "Death" (Hebrew: מות), which Fitz is unable to accept. Unknown to him, Simmons is alive on a desolate alien planet. Fitz realizes that the Monolith is a portal, and with help from the Asgardian Elliot Randolph and S.H.I.E.L.D. agent Daisy Johnson, is able to enter the portal. He finds Simmons and is able to rescue her just as Daisy's power destroys the Monolith. Simmons later tells Fitz about the six months she spent stranded on the desert planet. Fitz and Simmons eventually consummate their relationship.

In season four, Fitz discovers that S.H.I.E.L.D. ally Holden Radcliffe has created the android Aida, and agrees to help perfect her, while initially keeping this from Simmons. When Fitz's consciousness is submerged in the Framework, a virtual reality created by Radcliffe, he becomes "The Doctor", Hydra's remorseless second-in-command, and has a relationship with Aida, who now goes by Ophelia / Madame Hydra. After he creates for Aida a machine to become a real person, Fitz is forced out of the Framework, and is traumatized from his behavior there. But when Aida learns Fitz does not love her back, she plans her revenge on him. S.H.I.E.L.D. eventually succeeds in defeating her. Shortly after, everyone in the team except Fitz are taken away by an unknown group.

In season five, the team have been transported to a space station in the future, with only Fitz left behind. Fitz is taken into military custody, but broken out six months later with Lance Hunter's help. Enoch, a Chronicom, helps him escape to a secret bunker where Fitz learns that he was left behind so he could save the team. Aboard Enoch's ship, Fitz goes into stasis.

=== Future variant ===
Seventy-four years later, Enoch awakes Fitz when they reach their destination. After Fitz and the team return to the present, Fitz and Simmons marry in a ceremony organized by S.H.I.E.L.D. Due to multiple stressful factors, Fitz experiences a psychic split which enables his "Doctor" personality from the Framework to temporarily resurface. During the final battle against a gravitonium-enhanced Glenn Talbot, Fitz is buried under a rubble and later found fatally injured when dug out by fellow agents Melinda May and Mack where he succumbs to his wounds. Simmons resolves to find the present version of Fitz, who is in stasis aboard Enoch's ship.

=== Present variant ===
In season six, as Daisy and Simmons lead the search for Fitz, Enoch releases Fitz prematurely when they come under attack. They reach the planet Kitson, where Fitz and Simmons reunite until the assassin Malachi makes off with Fitz. For Fitz's safety, Simmons surrenders herself to Atarah, Enoch's former superior, so that the two of them can come up with a time-traveling method for the Chronicoms to use. Atarah traps Fitz and Simmons inside their own minds, forcing them to work together in figuring out time travel logic. The duo are ultimately freed by Enoch, who manages to overpower Atarah and her forces. The trio then teleport away, but end up again on Kitson, where Fitz and Simmons are saved from execution by mercenary Izel, who helps them on their return to Earth while Enoch bids them farewell. Izel believes Fitz and Simmons are conspiring against her, so she commands her ship's crew to eliminate them. The two are ultimately rescued by a team led by Mack, and return to Earth. While S.H.I.E.L.D stops Izel, Fitz and Simmons are ambushed by the Chronicom Hunters, but saved by Enoch who helps them achieve time travel as well as create a Coulson Life Model Decoy (LMD) to help them fight the Hunters.

In season seven, Fitz stays behind while the rest of the team is transported to the past to stop the Chronicoms from invading the Earth. Through the journey of the team Fitz is seen missing but aiding the team in their mission, carefully plotting the perfect plan for the survival of the team and the entire human race. Toward the end Fitz finally teleports from the main timeline to the branched off timeline after Simmons assembles the device. Fitz then devises yet another plan to bring his friend and the enemy Chronicoms back to the original timeline, which he achieves successfully. The team along with Fitz successfully destroy the Chronicoms' invasion scheme. Fitz and Simmons reunite with their daughter Alya, and a year later, decide to retire from S.H.I.E.L.D. to raise Alya.

== Concept and creation ==
Iain De Caestecker was cast as Leo Fitz in November 2012. Following injuries Fitz receives at the end of the first season, the series began to deal with brain trauma, as De Caestecker explained "From the get-go, before I even knew about it, the writers had the idea, and they did a lot of research in it with doctors. When I found out about it, I did my own research and correlated it together. It's just something that should never be trivialized. It's a real and serious thing to a lot of people, brain trauma, so we just have to constantly be respectful towards it. We talk about it all the time. Even if you don't see it or it's not obvious, it's always something that's in our heads that we're keeping going. It's the realization that you never get fully better, it's about embracing the new side of you and making that work in the world that you're in. I suppose the idea of a cure—I don't know if that could happen." For Fitz's costume design, Foley tried to have his clothes reflect his personality, without "getting too cliché...we try and play up his "heritage style"...using classic design details on him like paisley & leather elbow patches and mixing them with different plaids." The character is Scottish.

Despite being announced as a main cast member for the seventh season, De Caestecker does not appear in the first ten episodes, as he was committed to another project when the season started filming. He first appears in flashback sequences in "Brand New Day", receiving special guest star credit for his appearance.

== Characterization ==
De Caestecker, in describing the character, said that "Fitz has got this funny kind of temper. He's quite passionate about what he does. So those moments where—I don't think he's someone that really responds very quickly to emotion; he doesn't really understand emotions as much". Fitz has a lot of interaction with Simmons in the series, with De Caestecker explaining "My character, he's Engineering, so he's on the computer and tech side of everything. He's consumed within that world, and he works very closely with Simmons, who's Biochem. They've got this kind of weird chemistry together, and they just kind of fit each other in a very weird way." Regarding the changing dynamic over time between Fitz and Simmons, De Caestecker said "I suppose what's happened from the start of season two up to midseason is, they've become a lot stronger as individuals, I think. But I think they still care for and need each other a lot, and they also work better together when they are together. But I think there's a lot of things that have still been unsaid and will hopefully come out, certain confrontations that are still bubbling under." Fitz also develops a close friendship with Alphonso "Mack" Mackenzie, beginning when the latter joins the cast in season two.

== Reception ==
Reviewing the season 1 episode "0-8-4", Eric Goldman of IGN criticized the lack of development for the majority of main characters, specifically Fitz and Simmons as he did with the pilot episode. However, he was more positive while reviewing "FZZT", praising it for finally giving the "well-needed" development of them both. De Caestecker was named TVLine's "Performer of the Week" for the week of September 27, 2015, for his performance in "Laws of Nature", particularly the episode's final scene.

== Other appearances ==
=== Comics ===
Fitz made his Marvel Comics debut in S.H.I.E.L.D. vol. 3 #1 (Feb. 2015) by Mark Waid and Carlos Pacheco. He joins Phil Coulson's team to regain the Uru Sword, an ancient weapon that belonged to Heimdall. He contacted the Vision in helping Heimdall overcome an alien rock that was possessing him. Fitz then delivered the rock to be analyzed by Jemma Simmons.

His next assignment was protecting Wiccan from a man who had special bullets that could harm magic users. With Scarlet Witch's help, the team traveled to Antarctica to find the source and managed to defeat the people who were making the bullets. However, Dormammu took possession of Fitz and shot Scarlet Witch. After Dormammu was defeated, Fitz regained his senses.

He became part of an elaborate plan by Coulson to retrieve the Quantum Drive from Hydra agents. Afterwards, Maria Hill began to suspect that there was a traitor in their midst and hired Elektra to sniff him out. Because Coulson was absent, Fitz could not be safeguarded by him and was forced to flee when Elektra accused him of being the traitor. He meets up with Coulson, who is taken back to S.H.I.E.L.D. by Elektra, and escapes with Quake. Together they out the Department of Defense's General Strakovsky as the traitor and Fitz, along with Coulson and Quake, are reinstated at S.H.I.E.L.D.

=== Web series ===
Leo Fitz appears in the digital series Agents of S.H.I.E.L.D.: Slingshot with Iain De Caestecker reprising his role.

=== Video games ===
Fitz is a playable DLC character in Lego Marvel's Avengers.

=== Animation ===
Fitz, voiced by De Caestecker, appeared in "Lizards" a fourth season episode of the animated TV series Ultimate Spider-Man.
