= Dianne Doan =

Canadian actress (born 1990)

- Born: September 8, 1990 (age 36); Abbotsford, British Columbia, Canada
- Occupation: Actress
- Years active: 2010–present
- Spouse: Manny Jacinto (m. 2021)

Dianne Doan (born September 8, 1990) is a Canadian actress. She first came to attention in 2015, with her first of four appearances as Lonnie in the Descendants franchise, and is also known for her main role as Mai Ling, sister of the title character in the series Warrior (2021–2023).

== Early life ==
Dianne Doan was born on September 8, 1990, and raised in Abbotsford, British Columbia. She is of Vietnamese descent and has Chinese ancestry through her half Chinese grandmother.

She first developed an interest in acting in grade 9 when she took drama classes as an elective. She started technical training in dance at the age of 10.

== Career ==
As a young adult, she performed as a dancer in the Opening Ceremonies for the 2010 Winter Olympics in Vancouver and as a back-up dancer for Michael Bublé. In addition, she's worked as a dancer in other music videos for recording artists including Big Time Rush and Marianas Trench, and worked on the television series So You Think You Can Dance.

Her screen work on television included appearances on Once Upon a Time and Impastor, before a breakthrough role in the 2015 made-for-television movie Descendants as Lonnie, the daughter of Mulan and Li Shang. Part of the Descendants franchise, Doan launched her role earlier in 2015 in a prequel miniseries, returned to voice her character in a 2015–2017 animated miniseries, and reprised the character in the 2017 TV movie sequel Descendants 2.

In 2016, she was cast in season four of Vikings, in the recurring role of Yidu. Following that, she starred as twin sisters in the web series Guidance.

In 2017, she joined the main cast of Warrior, as the character of Mai Ling. The series is produced by filmmaker Justin Lin, based on an original concept by the late Bruce Lee.

== Personal life ==
In 2019, she became engaged to actor Manny Jacinto. In 2025, it was confirmed that the two had quietly gotten married shortly after their engagement started.

== Filmography ==
Television and film roles
Year	Title	Role	Notes
2010	Tower Prep	Lisa	Episode: "Monitored"
2013	Once Upon a Time	Isra	Episode: "Selfless, Brave and True"
2013	Impastor	Chelsea	Episode: "Genesis"
2015	Descendants: School of Secrets	Lonnie / Secret Blogger	Television shorts (voice role)
2015	Descendants	Lonnie	TV movie
2015–2017	Descendants: Wicked World	Lonnie	Television shorts (voice role)
2016	Vikings	Yidu	Recurring role (season 4); 7 episodes
2017	Descendants 2	Lonnie	TV movie
2017	Guidance	Faith Park-Jensen and Grace Park-Jensen	Web series, main cast (season 3)
2017	Legends of Tomorrow	Anh Ly	Episode: "Welcome to the Jungle"
2017	Last Night in Suburbia	Rachel	
2019	Good Trouble	Kate	3 episodes
2019–2023	Warrior	Mai Ling	Main cast
2020	Agents of S.H.I.E.L.D.	Kora	Recurring role (season 7); 6 episodes
2024	Better Half	Daphne	
2024	Tracker	Sun Mai	Episode: "Chicago"
2024	Reunion	Lisa	
2024–2025	Grey's Anatomy	Molly Tran	Recurring role (season 21); 8 episodes
2026-present	Avatar: Seven Havens	Zi, Various voices (voice)	
