= Life Model Decoy =

Type of android in Marvel Comics

Publication information
- Publisher: Marvel Comics
- First appearance: Strange Tales #135 (August 1965)
- Created by: Stan Lee; Jack Kirby

In story information
- Type: Android
- Element of stories featuring: S.H.I.E.L.D. Nick Fury

A Life Model Decoy (also known by the abbreviation LMD) is a fictional android appearing in American comic books published by Marvel Comics. Created by writer Stan Lee and artist Jack Kirby, LMDs first appeared in the short story "The Man For the Job!" featured in the anthology book Strange Tales #135 (August 1965). LMDs are android doppelgängers designed to be indistinguishable from real humans. Primarily used by S.H.I.E.L.D., especially Nick Fury, they serve as synthetic bodyguards and decoys to protect against assassination attempts. These androids can be mass-produced, often creating multiple copies of the same individual. Over various storylines, some LMDs have gained sentience or even assumed the identities of their originals.

Since their original introduction in comics, Life Model Decoys have been featured in various other Marvel-licensed products, including video games, television series, and films.

== Publication history ==
Life Model Decoys debuted in the short story "The Man For the Job!" in the anthology book Strange Tales #135 (August 1965), created by writer Stan Lee and artist Jack Kirby. The spy agency S.H.I.E.L.D. created LMDs of agent Nick Fury to use as decoys for an attack by the terrorist organization Hydra. LMDs have subsequently appeared in several comic book series, including Incredible Hulk (1962), Iron Man (1968), and Secret Warriors (2009).

== Powers and abilities ==
Life Model Decoys can mimic nearly every detail of the human they are based on, including fingerprints, retinal scans, and thought patterns. This makes them virtually indistinguishable from real people, allowing LMDs to stand in for individuals in a variety of situations, including encounters with telepaths. In addition, they possess superhuman strength, speed, and enhanced healing capabilities.

== Known examples ==
A number of Life Model Decoys with numerical designations have appeared in storylines. The following are listed in numerical order:

- 281 – Appears in the 2011 "Fear Itself" storyline.
- 361 – Appears in the 2011 Hulk storyline "Scorched Earth".
- 391 – Appears in the 2011 "Fear Itself" storyline.
- 399 – Appears in the 2011 "Fear Itself" storyline.
- 442 – Appears in the 2011 Hulk storyline "Scorched Earth".
- 737 – Appears in the 2011 Hulk storyline "Scorched Earth".

A number of Life Model Decoys have also been depicted impersonating specific characters. The following are listed in alphabetical order:

- Amber D'Alexis – The Life Model Decoy of the mother of Mikel Fury (aka Scorpio) appears in the 1994 graphic novel Wolverine/Nick Fury: Scorpio Rising.
- Annie – This female Life Model Decoy created and programmed by Bruce Banner in a 2011 Hulk storyline to assist Red Hulk between missions.
- Ant-Man – In a 2010 Secret Avengers storyline, a villain named Father replaces Eric O'Grady, the third Ant-Man, with an LMD following his death. This LMD later took on the identity of Black Ant.
- Bucky Barnes – An LMD of Bucky Barnes appears in the 2011 "Fear Itself" storyline.
- Black Panther - After Killmonger was resurrected by the Mandarin, he battled and appeared to have killed Black Panther, but it was later revealed that he had used an LMD to fake his death.
- Black Widow – An LMD of Black Widow appears in the 2011 "Fear Itself" storyline.
- Captain America – An LMD of the original Captain America, Steve Rogers, appears in a 1968 storyline in Captain America.
- Sharon Carter – An LMD of Captain America's ally, Sharon Carter, appears in a 1969 storyline in Captain America.
- Chuck – The Life Model Decoy who functions as the driver for Red Hulk and Annie is destroyed by Black Fog in a 2011 Hulk storyline.
- Deadpool – In the 2009 Hulk storyline "Code Red", Deadpool is attacked by a number of Life Model Decoys made to resemble him.
- Dum Dum Dugan – The 2014 storyline "Original Sin" reveals that Nick Fury's long-time S.H.I.E.L.D. subordinate was killed in 1966 and secretly replaced with an LMD that operated for many years without drawing suspicion from anyone, and which believes itself to be the genuine Dugan. The Dugan LMD appears in a 2015 storyline in Howling Commandos of S.H.I.E.L.D. and New Avengers, where it was revealed that the real Dugan is alive, preserved via suspended animation, and remotely controlling his LMD.
- Valentina Allegra de Fontaine - Years after the original allegedly died in a Russian gulag, a Life Model Decoy of de Fontaine was created. The LMD is equipped with plasma cannons, a cloaking device that can make her invisible, and cables that can hack into computer systems. She heads the O.X.E. group and is recruited by Bucky Barnes as part of his newest Thunderbolts lineup.
- Nick Fury – Numerous Life Model Decoys of Nick Fury are employed throughout his career.
  - Max Fury - One LMD of Nick Fury is an enhanced version that is stolen by Scorpio in a 1977 storyline, and later takes the name "Max Fury" after being recruited into the Shadow Council.
- Maria Hill – Maria Hill has used LMDs of herself as a tactical or hazardous situations that pose a danger to her life. During the 2008 storyline "Secret Invasion", S.H.I.E.L.D. Hill uses her LMD, which she uses to escape a group of Skrulls.
- Human Fly - The Big Man used numerous Human Fly LMDs to attack Spider-Man and J. Jonah Jameson. They were defeated when Jameson used a remote to hack into the Spider-Slayer replicas.
- Iron Man – LMDs of Iron Man, Tony Stark, were used as a tactical or hazardous situations that pose a danger to his life. In a 1969 storyline that ran in Iron Man #11-12, his archenemy, the Mandarin, discovers that he is secretly Iron Man. Tony has an LMD of himself built in order to trick the Mandarin into believing that Iron Man is actually someone else. Stark subsequently secures the LMD in a vault which gains sentience, and believes in being the real Tony Stark. Stark LMDs would reappear in subsequent storylines featuring Iron Man.
- Joanie – In a 2013 storyline in Avengers A.I., a Life Model Decoy is created by the terrorist weapons maker A.I.M. to infiltrate the youth culture in the 1970s. She later becomes an ally of Dimitrios.
- Master Matrix – An sentient super Life Model Decoy created by Richard and Mary Parker to control the other LMDs. When he tried to replace all humans with LMDs, he is stopped by Spider-Man and Deadpool and convinced into becoming a superhero.
- Nightshade – An LMD of this character appears in a 2012 storyline in Villains for Hire.
- Thunderbolt Ross – In a 2009 storyline in The Incredible Hulk, a Life Model Decoy of Ross is used to hide his identity as the Red Hulk.
- Valentina Rychenko – An LMD of Valentina Rychenko appears in the 2001 "Rage" storyline in X-Force.
- Glenn Talbot – During the 2010 "World War Hulks" storyline, a Life Model Decoy of Glenn Talbot is created and programmed to believe that it is the real Talbot resurrected. It is destroyed when Red Hulk tears its head off its body.
- Thor – An LMD of Thor appears in a 1976 Avengers storyline.

== Other versions ==
=== Heroes Reborn ===
In the alternate timeline of the "Heroes Reborn" storyline, Captain America is brainwashed into believing that he is a civilian living in the suburbs. As part of this ruse, his wife and son are LMDs assigned to protect him. Nick Fury also uses a Captain America LMD during secret missions.

=== Livewires ===
The android protagonists from the 2005 miniseries Livewires are built using LMD technology and Mannite technology. The main antagonists of the series are revealed to be rogue Nick Fury LMDs as well.

=== Ultimate Universe ===
In the Ultimate Universe (Earth-6160), the Maker's council utilizes Life Model Decoys of Nick Fury.

== In other media ==
=== Television ===
- Life Model Decoy models appear in The Avengers: Earth's Mightiest Heroes.
- A Life Model Decoy of Nick Fury appears in the Iron Man: Armored Adventures episode "Extremis".
- Life Model Decoys appear in Ultimate Spider-Man. These versions can holographically project a person's exact appearance and duplicate the powers of whoever they impersonate.
- Life Model Decoys appear in Avengers Assemble.

=== Marvel Cinematic Universe ===
- Life Model Decoy mentioned in The Avengers by Tony Stark while answering a phone call from Phil Coulson.
- The Agents of S.H.I.E.L.D. TV series has Life Model Decoys inspired by the Koenig siblings, though the project remained dormant until scientist and inventor Holden Radcliffe revived it in the present after he turned his A.I. assistant AIDA into an LMD, who went on to create more. Additionally, LMDs controlled by Anton Ivanov appear in the fourth and fifth seasons. while the seventh season introduces a Phil Coulson LMD enhanced with Chronicom technology.

=== Film ===
- Life Model Decoys appear in Nick Fury: Agent of S.H.I.E.L.D.

=== Video games ===
- LMDs appear in Spider-Man: Friend or Foe.
- LMDs of Nick Fury appear in Marvel: Ultimate Alliance 2.
- LMDs appear in Disney Infinity 2.0 as part of Nick Fury's special ability.
- LMDs appear in Marvel Contest of Champions as part of Nick Fury's signature ability.
