= Providence (Agents of S.H.I.E.L.D.) =

- Agents of S.H.I.E.L.D. episode
- "The Art of Level Seven" poster for the episode
- Episode no.: Season 1 Episode 18
- Directed by: Milan Cheylov
- Written by: Brent Fletcher
- Cinematography by: Feliks Parnell
- Editing by: Conrad Smart
- Original air date: April 15, 2014
- Running time: 42 minutes

Guest appearances
- Bill Paxton as John Garrett; David Conrad as Ian Quinn; Ruth Negga as Raina; B. J. Britt as Antoine Triplett; Adrian Pasdar as Glenn Talbot; Patton Oswalt as Eric Koenig; Patrick Brennan as Marcus Daniels

Episode chronology
← Previous "Turn, Turn, Turn"	Next → "The Only Light in the Darkness"
- Agents of S.H.I.E.L.D. season 1

"Providence" is the eighteenth episode of the first season of the American television series Agents of S.H.I.E.L.D. Based on the Marvel Comics organization S.H.I.E.L.D., it follows Phil Coulson and his team of S.H.I.E.L.D. agents as they scramble to survive following the destruction of their organization. It is set in the Marvel Cinematic Universe (MCU) and acknowledges the franchise's films. The episode was written by Brent Fletcher, and directed by Milan Cheylov.

Clark Gregg reprises his role as Coulson from the film series, and is joined by series regulars Ming-Na Wen, Brett Dalton, Chloe Bennet, Iain De Caestecker, and Elizabeth Henstridge.

"Providence" originally aired on ABC on April 15, 2014, and according to Nielsen Media Research, was watched by 5.52 million viewers.

== Plot ==
Grant Ward rescues Raina from prison and takes her to an abandoned S.H.I.E.L.D. base in Cuba, now repurposed by Hydra. He introduces her to John Garrett, who gives her the drug samples he collected from T.A.H.I.T.I. and instructs her to synthesize GH325. Ward provides Raina with the drive containing the Bus data, while he and Garrett raid the Fridge, killing the S.H.I.E.L.D. personnel stationed there. Garrett reveals that the Slingshot program, in which weapons are fired into space to keep them out of the wrong hands, is a deception, and all the weaponry is instead stored in a secret vault; they retrieve the Tesseract weapon found in Peru, the gravitonium generator and the Berserker staff, and also release numerous prisoners, including Ian Quinn.

Meanwhile, Phil Coulson's team, including Antoine Triplett, abandon the Hub when Glenn Talbot is dispatched to capture the remaining S.H.I.E.L.D. bases. Coulson's badge displays co-ordinates which he believes have been sent by Nick Fury, and he decides to follow the co-ordinates to the Canadian wilderness. The others are worried about his state of mind, with Melinda May concerned that Hydra may have used T.A.H.I.T.I. to hijack Coulson's brain, if the agent overseeing the project was a sleeper agent. They search the wilderness and find a secret base, Providence, manned by communications specialist agent Eric Koenig, who initially tells the team that Fury is dead, but privately informs Coulson of his survival.

Raina informs Ward and Garrett that Skye's encryption is too sophisticated and she cannot retrieve the data on the drive, so Garrett orders Ward to rejoin Coulson's team at Providence, and manipulate Skye into unlocking the drive. In an end tag, Garrett offers Quinn the gravitonium in exchange for continuing to assist Hydra.

== Production ==
=== Development and writing ===
In March 2014, Marvel revealed that the eighteenth episode would be titled "Providence", and would be written by Brent Fletcher, with Milan Cheylov directing. On Raina learning John Garrett was "the Clairvoyant", co-producer Shalisha Francis noted her reaction was discussed a lot with the writers, ultimately feeling "she would be really disappointed". Because of her fascination with powered people, learning Garrett simply had access to classified files was "alarming to her". Eric Koenig was written with Patton Oswalt in mind to portray him, because Oswalt "knows more about S.H.I.E.L.D. than any of" the writers.

=== Casting ===
In March 2014, Marvel revealed that main cast members Clark Gregg, Ming-Na Wen, Brett Dalton, Chloe Bennet, Iain De Caestecker, and Elizabeth Henstridge would star as Phil Coulson, Melinda May, Grant Ward, Skye, Leo Fitz, and Jemma Simmons, respectively. It was also revealed that the guest cast for the episode would include Bill Paxton as Agent John Garrett, David Conrad as Ian Quinn, Ruth Negga as Raina, B. J. Britt as Agent Antoine Triplett, Adrian Pasdar as colonel Glenn Talbot, Patton Oswalt as Eric Koenig, Patrick Brennan as Marcus Daniels, Rich Paul as Agent #1, Bayardo De Murguia as Agent #2, Jeffrey Muller as Agent Kaminsky, Alysha Del Valle as ABC reporter and Ramon Hilario as barber. Paul, De Murguia, Muller, Del Valle, and Hilario did not receive guest star credit in the episode. Paxton, Conrad, Negga, and Britt reprise their roles from earlier in the series.

=== Filming and design ===
Filming occurred from February 11 to 20, 2014. The set for Garret's Cuba hideout was designed to look like "a long-forgotten nightclub or an abandoned speakeasy".

== Release ==
=== Broadcast ===
"Providence" was first aired in the United States on ABC on April 15, 2014.

=== Marketing ===
For the final six episodes, Marvel began the "Marvel's Agents of S.H.I.E.L.D.: The Art of Level Seven" initiative, in which a different image was released each Thursday before a new episode, depicting a first look at a key event from the upcoming episode. Bell stated that the initiative was a way to tie the series back to its comics roots, and was thought of at the beginning of the season. The production team tried to pair specific artists to the teaser posters based on their previous work and how it connected to the themes and emotion of the intended episode. The poster for "Providence", created by Paolo Rivera, highlights the rise of Hydra by showing a melded Hydra and S.H.I.E.L.D. logo, and depicts the team divided by Coulson, Raina, and Ward.

=== Home media ===
The episode, along with the rest of Agents of S.H.I.E.L.D.'s first season, was released on Blu-ray and DVD on September 9, 2014. Bonus features include behind-the-scenes featurettes, audio commentary, deleted scenes, and a blooper reel. On November 20, 2014, the episode became available for streaming on Netflix. The episode, along with the rest of the series, was removed from Netflix on February 28, 2022, and later became available on Disney+ on March 16, 2022.

== Reception ==
=== Ratings ===
In the United States the episode received a 2.1/6 percent share among adults between the ages of 18 and 49, meaning that it was seen by 2.1 percent of all households, and 6 percent of all of those watching television at the time of the broadcast. It was watched by 5.52 million viewers.
