= The Only Light in the Darkness =

- Agents of S.H.I.E.L.D. episode
- "The Art of Level Seven" poster for the episode
- Episode no.: Season 1 Episode 19
- Directed by: Vincent Misiano
- Written by: Monica Owusu-Breen
- Cinematography by: Feliks Parnell
- Editing by: David Crabtree
- Original air date: April 22, 2014
- Running time: 42 minutes

Guest appearances
- Patrick Brennan as Marcus Daniels; Amy Acker as Audrey Nathan; B. J. Britt as Antoine Triplett; Patton Oswalt as Eric Koenig; Tsai Chin as Lian May

Episode chronology
← Previous "Providence"	Next → "Nothing Personal"
- Agents of S.H.I.E.L.D. season 1

"The Only Light in the Darkness" is the nineteenth episode of the first season of the American television series Agents of S.H.I.E.L.D. Based on the Marvel Comics organization S.H.I.E.L.D., it follows Phil Coulson and his team of S.H.I.E.L.D. agents as they face an escaped convict with enhanced abilities. It is set in the Marvel Cinematic Universe (MCU) and acknowledges the franchise's films. The episode was written by Monica Owusu-Breen, and directed by Vincent Misiano.

Clark Gregg reprises his role as Coulson from the film series, and is joined by series regulars Ming-Na Wen, Brett Dalton, Chloe Bennet, Iain De Caestecker, and Elizabeth Henstridge. The episode introduces guest star Amy Acker as Audrey Nathan, who was first mentioned in The Avengers as "the cellist".

"The Only Light in the Darkness" originally aired on ABC on April 22, 2014, and according to Nielsen Media Research, was watched by 6.04 million viewers.

== Plot ==
After arriving at Providence, Grant Ward tells Phil Coulson's team that he failed to stop the Fridge raid, but claims that he killed John Garrett. Eric Koenig insists on interrogating everyone except Coulson, using a near-unbeatable lie detector. Everyone passes, including Ward, who is nearly caught out when asked why he is continuing to stay with his team, before admitting his feelings for Skye.

Intending to recapture Fridge escapees, Coulson takes Ward's quinjet to Portland, Oregon, along with Leo Fitz, Jemma Simmons, and Antoine Triplett, to apprehend Marcus Daniels, who can absorb energy and attack others using Darkforce. Daniels ambushes Audrey Nathan, a woman he has been obsessed with for years, but she is rescued by Simmons and Triplett, while Coulson and Fitz attack Daniels with light, trying to feed him more energy than he can handle. However, his powers have been increased as a result of experimentation by Hydra, and he overpowers them and escapes. Audrey is revealed to be the cellist Coulson previously had a relationship with, having fallen for him after he saved her from Daniels. Coulson decides not to reveal himself to her, because she is moving on with her life and he still has a duty to stop Hydra.

Fitz suggests using Audrey to lure Daniels into a trap, and Coulson reluctantly agrees, as does Audrey. Rehearsing in a music hall, Audrey is again accosted by Daniels, before Fitz, Simmons and Triplett attack him with advanced pure light weapons, hoping they will be enough to kill Daniels. He overpowers them and approaches Audrey, but Coulson, obscured from Audrey's view, attacks Daniels with another light weapon, as does Triplett, causing Daniels to explode. The blast knocks Audrey unconscious, and Coulson tends to her, reassuring her that he is still alive, before she wakes up to find him gone.

Melinda May leaves Providence after repairing the damaged Bus, knowing Coulson no longer wants her around. Skye convinces Koenig to help her hack the NSA so they can review the CCTV footage of the Fridge raid to try to trace the escapees. Ward murders Koenig to conceal his involvement in the raid, covering up the footage, and then spends time with Skye, confiding in her further about his childhood and admitting that he beat up his younger brother Thomas on the instructions of his older brother Christian, of whom he was terrified. Ward insists that he is not a good man and Skye tries to console him, leading to a kiss, but Skye finds blood behind Ward's ear and he leaves the room to clean it. Looking for Koenig, Skye discovers his body and realizes that Ward is a Hydra agent. She leaves a message to warn the others before rejoining Ward, pretending to still be unaware of his true nature. He tells her that Coulson has sent orders for them to take the Bus to Portland and meet them. Coulson, Fitz, Simmons and Triplett later return to Providence and are confused to find no sign of May, Ward, Skye, Koenig, or the Bus.

In an end tag, May is picked up by her mother, a retired spy, who has located Maria Hill for her.

== Production ==
=== Development ===
In March 2014, Marvel revealed that the nineteenth episode would be titled "The Only Light in the Darkness", and would be written by Monica Owusu-Breen, with Vincent Misiano directing.

=== Writing ===
Executive producer Jeffrey Bell, on the decision to introduce the character known previously in the MCU only as "the cellist" here, said, "there's that one line and suddenly it's who is this person? And what is this person? And when are we going to see this person? And we talked about it a number of times over the season, and we had different versions and different ideas how to get there....at a time when [Coulson]'s at his most vulnerable, it seemed to be a good choice for us." Owusu-Breen added that the writing staff had a desire to find "something that anchored" Coulson, and a former lover was interesting to the writers.

Concerning the character of Blackout, Bell stated that "He's the antagonist, in the same way we've used other Marvel characters as antagonists in the episodes. At the same time, we're dealing with the fall-out of what happened with S.H.I.E.L.D., and the viewers finding out about Ward and what's going on over there, so there's a lot going on. Emotionally, he's perfect. Here's a character who absorbs light, and one of the things he says to Audrey – which is the title of the episode – he refers to her as "the only light in the darkness." And his obsession with the cellist is a beautiful metaphor, I think, for who Coulson is to her, who she is to Coulson, who S.H.I.E.L.D. is to the world...and the idea of S.H.I.E.L.D. falling apart, and Hydra coming out and darkness speaking, the idea of having Blackout as an antagonist seemed perfect."

=== Casting ===
In March 2014, Marvel revealed that main cast members Clark Gregg, Ming-Na Wen, Brett Dalton, Chloe Bennet, Iain De Caestecker, and Elizabeth Henstridge would star as Phil Coulson, Melinda May, Grant Ward, Skye, Leo Fitz, and Jemma Simmons, respectively. It was also revealed that the guest cast for the episode would include Bill Paxton as Agent John Garrett, Patrick Brennan as Marcus Daniels, Amy Acker as Audrey Nathan, B. J. Britt as Agent Antoine Triplett, and Patton Oswalt as Agent Eric Koenig. Tsai Chin also guest stars as Lian May. Paxton, Brennan, Britt, and Oswalt reprise their roles from earlier in the series.

=== Filming ===
Filming occurred from February 24 to March 5, 2014. Acker, who was filming Person of Interest at the time, was able to fly to Los Angeles for three days to film her scenes.

=== Music ===
With the introduction of Acker as Audrey, "the cellist", in this episode, composer Bear McCreary was able to bring back the Cellist Theme he composed for a brief moment in "The Magical Place" where the character was mentioned. For the sequence in the episode where the character plays cello, McCreary "wrote a collection of three short, repetitive musical figures set to various tempos" for Acker to learn and mimic with a cello coach, before performing the scene. Once the scene had been cut together, McCreary wrote a piece of music that "97%" matched Acker's visible movements, including timing and pitch. Eric Byers of the Calder Quartet performed the solo piece, working closely with McCreary to again mimic Acker's performance. A particularly tricky moment had the character suddenly stop playing on the arrival of Brennan's Daniels, with Byers trying "a dozen different versions" before he and McCreary were satisfied. McCreary stated that the biggest challenge "was to take all those constraints and compose a piece of music that satisfied them all and yet felt soaring and lyrical. After all that, I had to write orchestral score around the cello performance to help sell the tension, emotion, horror and triumph."

=== Marvel Cinematic Universe tie-ins ===
The character of Audrey was first mentioned as "the cellist" in The Avengers as a love interest for Coulson.

== Release ==
=== Broadcast ===
"The Only Light in the Darkness" was first aired in the United States on ABC on April 22, 2014.

=== Marketing ===
For the final six episodes, Marvel began the "Marvel's Agents of S.H.I.E.L.D.: The Art of Level Seven" initiative, in which a different image was released each Thursday before a new episode, depicting a first look at a key event from the upcoming episode. Bell stated that the initiative was a way to tie the series back to its comics roots, and was thought of at the beginning of the season. The production team tried to pair specific artists to the teaser posters based on their previous work and how it connected to the themes and emotion of the intended episode. The poster for "The Only Light in The Darkness", created by Pascal Campion, focuses on Coulson and his cellist lover, Audrey, while also hinting at the villain for the episode, Marcus Daniels. Bell called it "very emotional" given what the episode was about.

=== Home media ===
The episode, along with the rest of Agents of S.H.I.E.L.D.'s first season, was released on Blu-ray and DVD on September 9, 2014. Bonus features include behind-the-scenes featurettes, audio commentary, deleted scenes, and a blooper reel. On November 20, 2014, the episode became available for streaming on Netflix. The episode, along with the rest of the series, was removed from Netflix on February 28, 2022, and later became available on Disney+ on March 16, 2022.

== Reception ==
=== Ratings ===
In the United States the episode received a 1.9/6 percent share among adults between the ages of 18 and 49, meaning that it was seen by 1.9 percent of all households, and 6 percent of all of those watching television at the time of the broadcast. It was watched by 5.37 million viewers.
