= Agents of S.H.I.E.L.D. season 1 =

Agents of S.H.I.E.L.D.
- Season 1
- Promotional poster and home media cover art
- Showrunners: Jed Whedon; Maurissa Tancharoen; Jeffrey Bell
- Starring: Clark Gregg; Ming-Na Wen; Brett Dalton; Chloe Bennet; Iain De Caestecker; Elizabeth Henstridge
- No. of episodes: 22

Release
- Original network: ABC
- Original release: September 24, 2013 – May 13, 2014

Season chronology
- Next → Season 2

The first season of the American television series Agents of S.H.I.E.L.D., based on the Marvel Comics organization S.H.I.E.L.D., follows Phil Coulson and his team of S.H.I.E.L.D. agents on several dangerous cases revolving around Project Centipede and Coulson's mysterious resurrection following his death in the film The Avengers (2012). The season is set in the Marvel Cinematic Universe (MCU) and acknowledges the continuity of the franchise's films. It was produced by ABC Studios, Marvel Television, and Mutant Enemy Productions, with Jed Whedon, Maurissa Tancharoen, and Jeffrey Bell serving as showrunners.

Clark Gregg reprises his role as Coulson from the film series and is joined by series regulars Ming-Na Wen, Brett Dalton, Chloe Bennet, Iain De Caestecker, and Elizabeth Henstridge. Agents of S.H.I.E.L.D. was picked up for a full season by ABC in May 2013, and filming took place primarily in Los Angeles. The main recurring setting of the season is the Bus, a retrofitted Boeing C-17 Globemaster III plane that was designed by visual effects company FuseFX and created with CGI. Some episodes of the season directly crossover with the films Thor: The Dark World (2013) and Captain America: The Winter Soldier (2014), with the latter causing a major retooling of the season for its final six episodes. Several other actors also reprise their MCU roles in the season for guest appearances.

The season aired on ABC from September 24, 2013, to May 13, 2014, and consists of 22 episodes. Its pilot episode was watched by 12.12 million viewers, the highest ratings received by the first episode of a drama series since 2009, but ratings decreased as the season progressed. The critical reception was initially mixed, but grew more positive in the second half of the season and particularly after the crossover with The Winter Soldier. The series was renewed for a second season in May 2014.

== Episodes ==
No. overall	No. in season	Title	Directed by	Written by	Original release date	U.S. viewers (millions)
1	1	"Pilot"	Joss Whedon	Joss Whedon, Jed Whedon & Maurissa Tancharoen	September 24, 2013	12.12
Following the Battle of New York, Agent Phil Coulson, having survived his apparent death before the battle, assembles a team of agents (Melinda May, Grant Ward, Leo Fitz, and Jemma Simmons) to investigate superhumans and other related phenomena, which are now public knowledge. Their first assignment involves Mike Peterson, who was supplied with an Extremis-containing serum by Project Centipede. Skye, a member of the hactivist group the Rising Tide who saw Peterson in action, warns him about S.H.I.E.L.D. and offers to help him, but he declines. While visiting the scene where Peterson rescued a woman from a burning building, the team learns that the fire was caused by another subject exploding because of Extremis. Skye is kidnapped by Peterson, who is now on the run, and makes her erase all his personal information. Coulson's team is able to track them down and subdue Peterson, taking him into S.H.I.E.L.D. custody. Viewing Skye as an asset, Coulson offers her a place on his team.
2	2	"0-8-4"	David Straiton	Maurissa Tancharoen, Jed Whedon & Jeffrey Bell	October 1, 2013	8.66
Skye is now integrated into Coulson's team as a consultant. Their next assignment is in Peru, tracking an "0-8-4", the S.H.I.E.L.D. code for "an object of unknown origin". Once there, the team quickly realizes that the object is a piece of forgotten Hydra technology powered by Tesseract energy. Coulson meets with a former colleague and officer in the Peruvian military, Camilla Reyes, and brings her team aboard their plane, the Bus. Reyes betrays Coulson in order to take the Hydra weapon for her government so they can defeat Peruvian rebels. The squabbling team members band together and take out Reyes' men. When the plane lands at a S.H.I.E.L.D. base, Reyes is taken into custody. Later, Skye is revealed to still be loyal to the Rising Tide, while Director Nick Fury scolds Coulson for the damage to the plane and warns him of the risk Skye poses.
3	3	"The Asset"	Milan Cheylov	Jed Whedon & Maurissa Tancharoen	October 8, 2013	7.87
S.H.I.E.L.D. searches for one of its assets, Dr. Franklin Hall, who was kidnapped by Ian Quinn, CEO of Quinn Worldwide, using a gravity-based device. Quinn wants to use Hall to take control of the planet's gravity by building a giant "gravitonium" generator. Heading to Malta with the team, Skye volunteers to infiltrate Quinn's mansion during a party so that Coulson and Ward can rescue Hall. Skye tricks Quinn into believing she is betraying S.H.I.E.L.D. for the Rising Tide. However, Coulson soon discovers that Hall perpetrated his own escape in order to find and destroy both the gravitonium and the generator. Coulson warns him that doing so would end up killing millions. Their violent disagreement forces Coulson to send Hall into the generator, seemingly consuming him, but shutting the machine down at the same time. Coulson orders that the gravitonium be placed under high security off the books at S.H.I.E.L.D.; however, no one notices that Hall is still somehow alive within the gravitonium.
4	4	"Eye Spy"	Roxann Dawson	Jeffrey Bell	October 15, 2013	7.85
Coulson and his team investigate a series of diamond thefts by Coulson's former protégé Akela Amador, who is being blackmailed by an unknown handler using an explosive cybernetic eye. Coulson is able to take Amador to the Bus, while Fitz and Simmons create a pair of glasses that hijack her feed. This allows Ward to carry out Amador's mission while the team attempts to disarm and remove her cybernetic eye. Ward completes the mission, discovering mysterious carvings, while Coulson finds who he thinks is Amador's handler, only for that man to be killed through a similar device to Amador's. With the cybernetic eye now removed, Amador is taken away by S.H.I.E.L.D. agents, though Coulson promises her she will have a fair trial in which he will testify for her. Before she goes, Amador tells May that something seems different to her about Coulson.
5	5	"Girl in the Flower Dress"	Jesse Bochco	Brent Fletcher	October 22, 2013	7.39
The team attempts to find Chan Ho Yin, a Chinese street performer with pyrokinetic abilities, after he is kidnapped by Project Centipede recruiter Raina. Raina injects him with Extremis to increase his power, before harvesting his blood platelets for further experimentation. Skye knows a hacker who could have released the information on Chan's location and abilities; she secretly sleeps with him, trying to discover the truth. May finds them and, not trusting Skye, arrests them. S.H.I.E.L.D. attacks the Centipede facility and attempts to help Chan, but he refuses and May activates the unstable Extremis within him to kill him. Coulson questions Skye and she reveals that she joined the Rising Tide and S.H.I.E.L.D to find her parents. Coulson agrees to help her, but fits her with a device to block any computer access. Raina visits Centipede member Po in prison, telling him to inform the "Clairvoyant" of the experiment's results.
6	6	"FZZT"	Vincent Misiano	Paul Zbyszewski	November 5, 2013	7.15
The team investigates a series of deaths involving levitation and electrostatic anomalies. Although the team initially assumed the deaths were caused by some form of weapon, the cause is found to be an alien virus from a Chitauri helmet salvaged from the Battle of New York. When Simmons is infected by the fatal virus, she and Fitz work feverishly on a cure while Coulson ignores a direct order from Agent Felix Blake to sacrifice Simmons and save the rest of the team. With time running out and unaware that their last attempt at a vaccine was successful, Simmons leaps from the plane, though Ward manages to save her by jumping out after her and inoculating her before she dies. May tells Coulson, who feels differently than he did before he died, that anyone would be changed by such an experience. The helmet is delivered to Agent Blake, who warns Coulson of the consequences of disobeying a direct order from headquarters, though Coulson dismisses this, accepting that he is different now.
7	7	"The Hub"	Bobby Roth	Rafe Judkins & Lauren LeFranc	November 12, 2013	6.67
At The Hub, a S.H.I.E.L.D. command facility, Agent Victoria Hand assigns Ward and Fitz to a mission in South Ossetia, where they must disable a weapon called "the Overkill Device", which turns enemy weapons against their users. Skye and Simmons try to find more information about the mission, which has been classified as Level 8, with Simmons tranquilizing Agent Jasper Sitwell when he catches her hacking into Level 8 files. Skye learns that there is no extraction team for them and informs Coulson, who takes his team to rescue Ward and Fitz, who are successful in their mission. Later at The Hub, Coulson discovers that the person who brought Skye to the orphanage was an unidentified S.H.I.E.L.D. agent. However, Coulson does not tell Skye the entire truth about the file and asks May to discreetly investigate further. Coulson is later denied access to information about his recuperation in Tahiti, despite his Level 8 clearance.
8	8	"The Well"	Jonathan Frakes	Monica Owusu-Breen	November 19, 2013	6.89
The team looks into a plot to find and assemble three parts of an Asgardian Berserker Staff which imbues the holder with super strength and an uncontrollable rage. They are opposed by a pagan hate group that has already discovered the first piece of the staff. With Thor off the grid, Coulson's team is assisted by Dr. Elliot Randolph. While retrieving the second piece of the staff, Ward touches it and relives a traumatic childhood memory involving his abusive older brother. He becomes irritable, aggressive, and much stronger. After the team realizes that Randolph is an Asgardian who has lived on Earth for centuries, he gives them the location of the third staff piece. Once the team recovers it, Ward and May use the completed staff to defeat the pagans. In a hotel, Ward declines Skye's invitation to talk, instead following May into her room, while Coulson has a nightmare about his recuperation in Tahiti.
9	9	"Repairs"	Billy Gierhart	Maurissa Tancharoen & Jed Whedon	November 26, 2013	9.69
A mysterious force threatens Coulson's team when they bring in a safety inspector named Hannah Hutchins, who is blamed for an explosion that killed four technicians and who Coulson believes has subsequently developed telekinesis. After the plane makes an emergency landing, the team discovers that the mysterious force is one of the technicians named Tobias Ford who is trapped between Earth and "Hell" following the accident. Ford "targets" Hutchins to protect her from those who would try to harm her. It is later revealed that Ford caused minor safety issues and filed safety reports to spend time with Hutchins. One of his issues inadvertently caused the explosion. May manages to defeat Ford and convinces him to let go, causing Ford to disappear to an unknown location. Coulson tells more about May's difficult past and how he wants to help her recover. May later pulls a prank on Fitz, revealing that she is healing.
10	10	"The Bridge"	Holly Dale	Shalisha Francis	December 10, 2013	6.11
Coulson recruits Peterson to his team for super soldier support when Edison Po is sprung from prison by upgraded Centipede super soldiers. Coulson's team traces a Centipede-powered soldier to an abandoned factory and is ambushed by a squad of super soldiers who were subjected to the same eye implant as Akela Amador. Po recommends Raina stop inquiring after the Clairvoyant, as it could mean her death. Meanwhile, Coulson and May are keeping information regarding Skye's parents from her. When Peterson contacts his son, Ace, he learns that he has been kidnapped by Centipede, who suggest a trade – Peterson for his son. Coulson escorts Peterson to the arranged exchange, where Peterson reveals that Centipede wants Coulson, not Peterson. Coulson agrees to be taken prisoner. After the exchange, Peterson attempts to rescue Coulson, but is apparently killed in an explosion. Raina tells Coulson that they want to know how he was resurrected.
11	11	"The Magical Place"	Kevin Hooks	Paul Zbyszewski & Brent Fletcher	January 7, 2014	6.63
Victoria Hand leads S.H.I.E.L.D.'s efforts to rescue Coulson while Centipede tortures him to learn the secret of his resurrection. Believing Skye to be untrustworthy and after seeking May's input, Hand has Skye removed from the Bus. Skye sets out on her own investigation, which leads the team to Coulson's location. After the Clairvoyant kills Po, Raina takes over Coulson's interrogation. She uses a scanning device to compel him to remember aspects of his being brought back to life. As Coulson experiences flashbacks, the team rescues him after capturing Raina. Coulson confronts Streiten, who tells Coulson he had been dead for days and was resurrected on the orders of Director Fury. Streiten reveals that, after his revival, Coulson had lost the will to live and the doctors manipulated Coulson's brain to give him false memories in order for him to continue his work. It is later shown that Peterson is alive, albeit badly burned, missing the lower half of his right leg and with an explosive surveillance eye implanted in him by someone working for the Clairvoyant.
12	12	"Seeds"	Kenneth Fink	Monica Owusu-Breen & Jed Whedon	January 14, 2014	6.37
While at a S.H.I.E.L.D. Academy, Ward, Fitz, Simmons, and Skye investigate an attack upon Seth Dormer, a popular cadet, with an "ice machine" that can freeze people and their surroundings. Another ice machine soon freezes cadet Donnie Gill, though the agents are able to save him. While the rest of the team interrogates the other cadets, Fitz befriends Gill, seeing much of himself in him, and helps him solve a problem with a new power source. Meanwhile, Coulson and May go to Mexico City to find a former agent named Richard Lumley, who tells them of a mission 21 years earlier involving Skye, an 0-8-4 with apparent superhuman abilities. The team deduces that the cadets are building a bigger ice machine for Quinn and, with the better power source, Dormer and Gill give Quinn a demonstration, creating a massive ice storm. Though the team apprehends Gill, Dormer is killed by the storm and Gill gains apparent cryokinetic abilities. Later, Coulson calls Quinn, who has connections to the Clairvoyant.
13	13	"T.R.A.C.K.S."	Paul Edwards	Lauren LeFranc & Rafe Judkins	February 4, 2014	6.62
Hunting the Clairvoyant, the team boards a train in Italy on which a Cybertek Inc. security group is shipping a package to Quinn. The group is exposed, forcing Coulson and Ward to flee the train. Meeting up with May, they get back to the train and Simmons, but Fitz and Skye are gone, having already followed the package to Quinn's mansion. Skye is confronted by Quinn and discovers the alive Peterson in a hyperbaric chamber. Inside the package is a high-tech prosthetic leg from Cybertek's "Project Deathlok" that Quinn fits onto Peterson's amputated right leg. Peterson goes on to murder the Cybertek guards on the orders of the Clairvoyant, who has once again kidnapped Ace. Quinn shoots Skye twice in the stomach and leaves her for dead. S.H.I.E.L.D. raids the mansion and finds Skye after capturing Quinn. Simmons can only sustain Skye temporarily by placing her in the hyperbaric chamber.
14	14	"T.A.H.I.T.I."	Bobby Roth	Jeffrey Bell	March 4, 2014	5.46
Skye is rushed to a S.H.I.E.L.D. medical facility, but the doctors are only able to stabilize her. Agents John Garrett and Antoine Triplett arrive to take Quinn for questioning, but Coulson refuses to turn him over. Garrett decides to interrogate Quinn on the Bus, learning that the Clairvoyant ordered Quinn to shoot Skye so they could learn about Coulson's resurrection. Fitz and Simmons, after looking over Coulson's files, realize that Coulson was revived at a place known as the "Guest House", where Coulson, Ward, Garrett, and Fitz head for answers. Fitz finds the needed drug while Coulson discovers a room marked "T.A.H.I.T.I." and the source of the drug, the upper half of a blue-skinned humanoid corpse. Everyone escapes the facility, as it was rigged to explode, and, despite Coulson attempting to stop it based on what he saw in the T.A.H.I.T.I. room, Fitz gets the drug to Simmons in time to successfully save Skye.
15	15	"Yes Men"	John Terlesky	Shalisha Francis	March 11, 2014	5.99
The Asgardian Lorelei enslaves a biker gang and begins to form an army. The team is summoned to investigate an energy reading from the Bifrost, encountering Sif, who is seeking Lorelei. She explains that Lorelei escaped imprisonment during the attack of the Dark Elves (Note: During the events of Thor: The Dark World.) and, to neutralize her power of controlling the minds of men, Sif must fit a special collar around her neck that prevents her from speaking. They fight Lorelei and her men, but Lorelei enchants Ward and they commandeer the Bus. Lorelei tells May that Ward loves someone else. While May fights Ward, Sif confronts Lorelei and fixes the collar to her neck, undoing her enchantment. Sif returns Lorelei to Asgard and May ends her relationship with Ward. Coulson tells Skye the origin of the drug used to revive them but, despite how disturbed Coulson is by this fact, Skye remains optimistic. He orders Skye to keep the origin of the drug a secret until Fury gives them the truth. Unknown to them, May is monitoring their conversation and reporting to someone else.
16	16	"End of the Beginning"	Bobby Roth	Paul Zbyszewski	April 1, 2014	5.71
Agents Garrett, Triplett, Hand, Sitwell, and Blake join the team in hunting the Clairvoyant. The agents pair up to pursue different candidates. While searching for Thomas Nash, May and Blake encounter Peterson/Deathlok and tag him with a tracker. They soon converge on his new location while Triplett and Simmons stay at the Hub with Hand. The team finds Nash, a vegetative man on life support who communicates through a computer. When Nash boasts about being the Clairvoyant and says that Centipede will kill Skye, Ward kills him. Coulson and Skye soon realize that Nash was not the Clairvoyant, but that the Clairvoyant is a high-ranking member of S.H.I.E.L.D. Coulson accuses Ward of working with the Clairvoyant and shooting Nash, but they are interrupted when Fitz discovers May's secret phone line. As Coulson and Skye standoff with May in the hangar, control of the Bus is hijacked by the Hub, where Hand orders everyone onboard to be killed.
17	17	"Turn, Turn, Turn"	Vincent Misiano	Jed Whedon & Maurissa Tancharoen	April 8, 2014	5.37
After the Bus is hijacked, Garrett's jet is attacked by S.H.I.E.L.D. drones and he rejoins the team. At the Hub, Simmons and Triplett begin working together to secretly upload her research on Skye's blood, only for a Hydra assault on all S.H.I.E.L.D. facilities (Note: As seen in Captain America: The Winter Soldier.) to force them into hiding. Coulson locks May in the interrogation room with Ward, still believing she is the traitor. Skye discovers a secret code in a signal on S.H.I.E.L.D.'s network that she deciphers to reveal Hydra's infiltration. When the Bus arrives at the Hub, the group splits into teams to capture Hand. However, Hand reveals that she is not a member of Hydra, but believes that Coulson is, recruiting Triplett and Simmons to aid her in stopping them. Garrett accidentally discloses information that reveals himself as the true Clairvoyant and is captured by Coulson and May. Ward accompanies Hand to the Fridge so he can see to Garrett's imprisonment personally, but shortly reveals his own allegiance to Hydra by killing Hand and freeing Garrett.
18	18	"Providence"	Milan Cheylov	Brent Fletcher	April 15, 2014	5.52
Ward frees Raina and introduces Garrett to her as the Clairvoyant. Though disappointed that he is not actually clairvoyant, she agrees to try to replicate the "Guest House" drug. Colonel Glenn Talbot sends a military team to the Hub, so Coulson leaves with the team and Triplett, ordering Skye to erase all their identities, including Ward's. Coulson discovers a message with coordinates in the Canadian wilderness where they find the hidden S.H.I.E.L.D. base Providence run by Agent Eric Koenig. Coulson learns from Koenig that Fury is alive, but is told to keep the information secret. He also learns from May that Fury did not oversee the T.A.H.I.T.I. project. Ward and Garrett infiltrate the Fridge, freeing its prisoners and stealing weapons, including the Berserker Staff, the 0-8-4 from Peru, and the gravitonium. Raina informs Garrett that the hard drive containing all of Simmons and Skye's research is locked and only Skye can access it, prompting Garrett to send Ward to Providence.
19	19	"The Only Light in the Darkness"	Vincent Misiano	Monica Owusu-Breen	April 22, 2014	6.04
Koenig subjects Coulson's team to a rigorous lie detector test, which Ward narrowly beats to maintain his cover. Coulson takes Fitz, Simmons, and Triplett to stop Marcus Daniels, a superhuman and former Fridge inmate possessing the Darkforce who is obsessed with cellist Audrey Nathan, Coulson's former love interest. After rescuing Nathan, they devise a plan to lure out Daniels. The group overloads him with energy, causing him to explode. Coulson covertly comforts Nathan before withdrawing, as he plans on telling her he is alive some other day. Meanwhile, May leaves the team, tired of Coulson not trusting her. Skye and Koenig hack the NSA to get eyes on the Hydra attack at the Fridge, forcing Ward to murder Koenig to prevent discovery. Skye finds Koenig's body and realizes that Ward is with Hydra. In order to avoid suspicion by Ward, Skye joins him as they steal the Bus before Coulson and the others return to Providence. Later in Ontario, Canada, May is picked up by her mother, who helps her look for Maria Hill.
20	20	"Nothing Personal"	Billy Gierhart	Paul Zbyszewski & DJ Doyle	April 29, 2014	5.95
Fitz finds a message left by Skye informing them that Ward is a member of Hydra. Hill and a Special Forces team led by Talbot arrive at Providence, where Hill tries to convince Coulson's team to surrender themselves. However, upon hearing of Ward's betrayal, Hill decides to aid the team directly in their hunt. Skye leads Ward to the diner where she met Peterson and secretly tips off the police. She reveals that she knows his secret and escapes while he fights the police, but she is captured by Deathlok. As Ward tries to fly the Bus away, he is confronted by Hill and Triplett, who stall long enough for Coulson to sneak on board. Coulson frees Skye and they escape. The team retreats to a hotel, where Skye reveals she left a trap in the hard drive. Hill departs for D.C. while May returns and shows Coulson the contents of a flash drive she recovered from his false grave. The file is a video of Coulson himself, who was apparently the head of Project T.A.H.I.T.I., informing Fury that the project must be shut down due to its horrific side effects.
21	21	"Ragtag"	Roxann Dawson	Jeffrey Bell	May 6, 2014	5.37
In flashbacks, a teenage Ward is seen in juvenile detention where he first meets Garrett and accepts his offer to join his organization. Over the years, Garrett trains Ward and eventually tells him about Hydra. In the present, Coulson and May infiltrate Cybertek (who they realize is connected to both Centipede and Hydra) and learn that Garrett was the first Deathlok, his implants are failing, and he needs the Guest House drug to survive. The team travels to Havana, Cuba, discovering the recently abandoned Hydra base, and Fitz and Simmons find the captured Bus. The latter are caught by Ward and taken aboard the Bus, which departs. Fitz disables Garrett's implants with an EMP and the dying Garrett orders Ward to kill them. After the two agents lock themselves in the Bus' infirmary, Ward ejects it into the ocean. Raina injects Garrett with her synthesized Guest House drug. Initially, it seems to cause an Extremis reaction, but Garrett recovers. Quinn attempts to sell Deathlok soldiers to the military and invites them to tour Cybertek's facility.
22	22	"Beginning of the End"	David Straiton	Maurissa Tancharoen & Jed Whedon	May 13, 2014	5.45
At Cybertek, Quinn begins his presentation to U.S. military officials, only for Garrett to interrupt and kill one of them. Evading the Centipede soldiers, Coulson and his team attack the Cybertek facility, with Quinn and Raina escaping with the gravitonium, Skye saving Ace, May defeating Ward, and Coulson confronting Garrett. Fury rescues Fitz and Simmons, though Fitz is barely alive, before joining with Coulson to face Garrett, who is ultimately dispatched by Peterson when he learns that Skye has saved Ace. Peterson, unable to face his son, goes off on his own to redeem himself. Fury expresses his respect for Coulson, who he sees as an Avenger, and appoints him the new Director of S.H.I.E.L.D., leading the team to a secret base run by Agent Koenig's brother, Billy. Raina delivers a photo of Skye to a mysterious man, telling him she has found his daughter. Later, Coulson awakens in the middle of the night and begins exhibiting signs of the same enhanced mental capacities and fixation that Garrett experienced, compulsively carving strange symbols into a wall.

== Cast and characters ==
=== Main ===
- Clark Gregg as Phil Coulson
- Ming-Na Wen as Melinda May
- Brett Dalton as Grant Ward
- Chloe Bennet as Skye
- Iain De Caestecker as Leo Fitz
- Elizabeth Henstridge as Jemma Simmons

=== Recurring ===
- J. August Richards as Mike Peterson / Deathlok
- David Conrad as Ian Quinn
- Ruth Negga as Raina
- Saffron Burrows as Victoria Hand
- Bill Paxton as John Garrett / The Clairvoyant
- B. J. Britt as Antoine Triplett

=== Notable guests ===
- Cobie Smulders as Maria Hill
- Samuel L. Jackson as Nick Fury
- Titus Welliver as Felix Blake
- Maximiliano Hernández as Jasper Sitwell
- Jaimie Alexander as Sif

== Production ==
=== Development ===
In August 2012, it was announced that Marvel's The Avengers (2012) director Joss Whedon would be involved in an upcoming project for ABC, set within the Marvel Cinematic Universe (MCU). A few weeks later, ABC ordered a pilot for a show called S.H.I.E.L.D., to be written by Joss Whedon, Jed Whedon, and Maurissa Tancharoen, directed by Joss Whedon, and executive produced by Joss Whedon, Jed Whedon, Tancharoen, Jeffrey Bell, and Jeph Loeb. Jed Whedon, Tancharoen and Bell were slated to serve as the series' showrunners. Joe Quesada, Alan Fine, and Stan Lee also executive produce. In April 2013, ABC announced that the show would be titled Marvel's Agents of S.H.I.E.L.D., and it was officially picked up to series in May. In October, ABC announced that it had ordered a full season of 22 episodes. After the ratings for the early episodes were not to the liking of ABC, Marvel's Dan Buckley went to the network to request they allow the creatives to create the show they wanted, rather than try to work with notes from the network that asked the series to appeal to their main audience demographic, "upscale women".

=== Writing ===
From day one Grant Ward was Hydra in our minds ... if we felt like we needed other options, we could have changed. Here's an example of changing. We didn't know we were going to fall in love with Ruth Negga the way we did as Raina. She came in for episode five but we thought 'She's cool' and so we brought her back. So what would have been somebody else became her, and as we fell in love with her character, we wrote more and more to that. We knew J. Richards was going to be Deathlok but we didn't know we were going to care about him as much as we did ... We knew the kind of person we wanted to bring in as The Clairvoyant and we knew we wanted a mislead so we brought in Victoria Hand. The fact that Bill Paxton worked out was fantastic. You're going to write that character in a certain way because of who the actor is, so that changes, but we did know we were going to introduce The Clairvoyant, that we were going to introduce he was Hydra and then use that to reveal Ward. Those were things we knew loosely.

— Jeffrey Bell, executive producer, on the evolving nature of characters and story lines throughout the season.

Writers for the season include Paul Zbyszewski, Monica Owusu-Breen, Brent Fletcher, Lauren LeFranc, Rafe Judkins, and Shalisha Francis, alongside Joss Whedon, Jed Whedon, Bell, and Tancharoen. The character arcs were laid out by the series' creative team, with Marvel's only guidelines being to work around Captain America: The Winter Soldier, which sees S.H.I.E.L.D. destroyed. Jed Whedon said on this, "if someone told you that concept, you'd think it was a great thing to have happen at the beginning of the show or the end of Season 3. To have it happen in the middle of your first season is an interesting kind of riddle". The writers worked to establish a "regular day at S.H.I.E.L.D." and the existing hierarchy, and then "to blow that up, we knew the way to best illustrate that was by putting it on a personal level with our main man Coulson". Leading up to the Winter Soldier tie-in, the writers avoided talking about Hydra except in terms of their history in the MCU in order to avoid spoiling the film. Tancharoen elaborated that "We see what it actually looks like for S.H.I.E.L.D. to crumble in Captain America 2, we see the Helicarriers literally barreling through the Triskelion, we see the massive destruction throughout the city, but the benefit of our show is we get to dive into the emotional toll of that." Therefore, it was decided at the beginning of the series that one of the main characters would be a traitor, with Jed Whedon saying "since this is an infiltration based on betrayal on a massive scale, we wanted to have it on the small scale, and have it be a really personal dagger to the heart". Executives at ABC did not believe having Grant Ward be the traitor would work, because they felt Dalton was too handsome for the audience to believe it to be real. They felt the creatives should change their choice, and were keen on Jemma Simmons being the traitor, since it would have been unexpected given she was "so sweet". After dealing with the fall of S.H.I.E.L.D., the writers were able to "put the pedal to the metal" and shift from the standalone stories preceding it to more serialized episodes. Whedon would later say this shift was where "we found our voice in the series after a rocky start". Zbyszewski added that there had been resistance early in the season from the network to have serialized episodes, over single mysteries per episode.

On whether it was Marvel's idea or the showrunner's to have Coulson promoted to Director and tasked with rebuilding S.H.I.E.L.D. at the end of the season, Jed Whedon said "They're one in [sic] the same. They have plans for films, and we have plans to intermingle with them, and it's the name of our show. The second to last episode is called 'Ragtag', and that's a term we've used; we wanted to create this ragtag group, but within this giant organization with billions of dollars and support all over the globe and satellite feeds on their luxurious plane. Now we have a chance to start them over and figure out what it's like to really be a secret again."

=== Casting ===
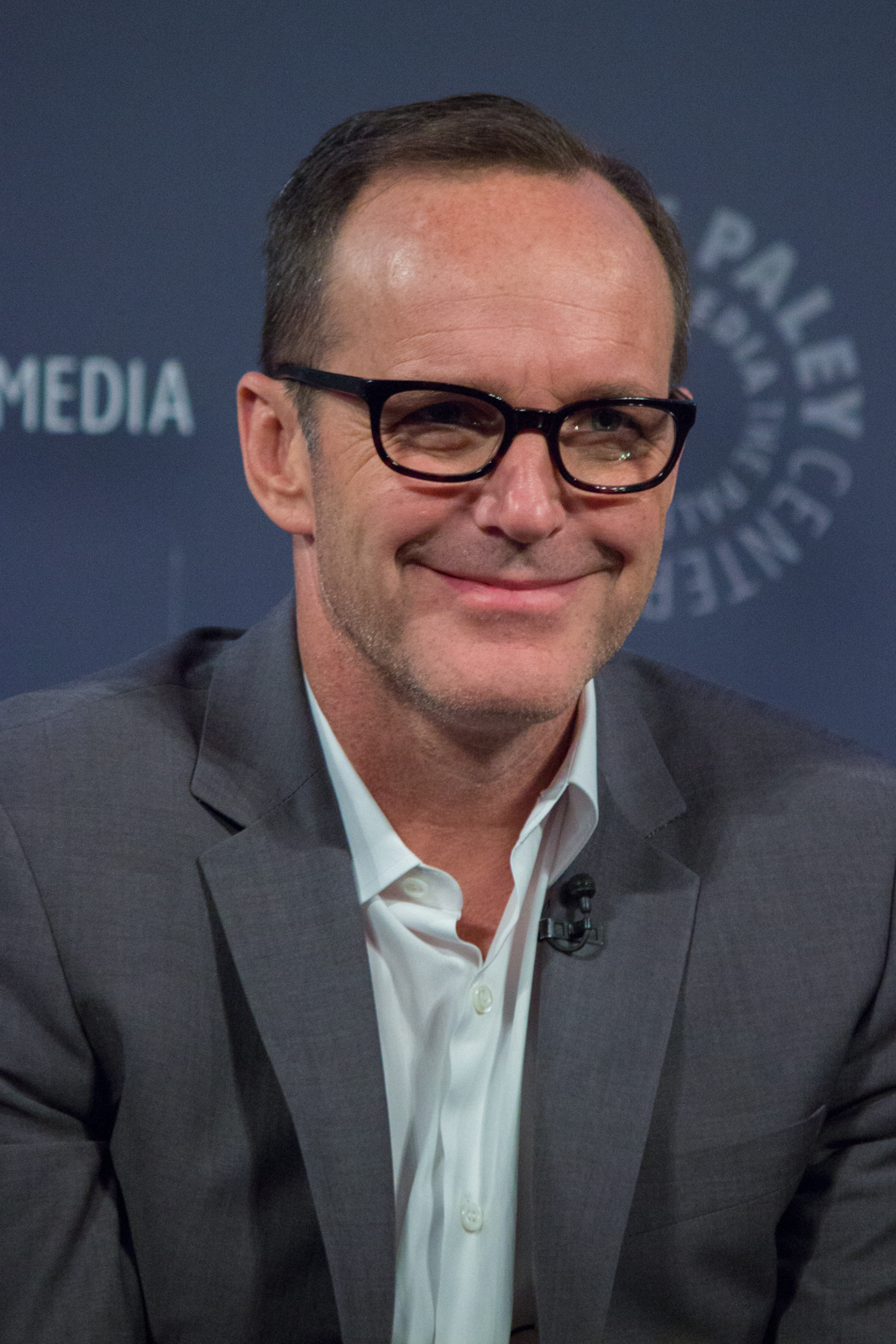
Clark Gregg headlines the series, reprising the role of Phil Coulson from the MCU films

The main cast for the season includes Clark Gregg as Phil Coulson, reprising his role from the film series, Ming-Na Wen as Melinda May, Brett Dalton as Grant Ward, Chloe Bennet as Skye, Iain De Caestecker as Leo Fitz, and Elizabeth Henstridge as Jemma Simmons.

In April 2013, J. August Richards, one of the stars of the earlier Joss Whedon series Angel (1999-2004), was cast in the pilot in an unspecified role, later revealed to be Mike Peterson, the first live-action portrayal of Deathlok and a recurring character throughout the season. Nicholas Brendon, another Whedon collaborator, was also reportedly considered for Richards' role. In December, two recurring characters were set to be added to the series with the episode "T.A.H.I.T.I." They were described as "an African-American agent who specializes in combat/weapons, and a high-level S.H.I.E.L.D. agent/munitions expert who has past ties to both Coulson and Ward". In January 2014, Bill Paxton was cast as Agent John Garrett, "a rough-and-tumble former cohort of Agent Coulson with a little bit of attitude and cigar-smoking swagger", for at least four episodes of the season. Jed Whedon said that "We actually discussed Bill Paxton in the room, when we were talking about the character ... Then when he came up as an actual possibility, we couldn't believe it." The next month, B. J. Britt was cast as Agent Antoine Triplett, an associate of Garrett. Other recurring guests in the season include Saffron Burrows as Victoria Hand, David Conrad as Ian Quinn, and Ruth Negga as Raina.

In January 2013, Cobie Smulders, who played agent Maria Hill in The Avengers, said that her character may make an appearance in the show and that her commitment to How I Met Your Mother (2005-2014) would not prevent her from participating. Smulders reprised the role of Hill in the pilot, with Joss Whedon saying, "I wanted very much to have Cobie in the pilot because as much as anyone else, she is S.H.I.E.L.D." Smulders returned once again in the episode "Nothing Personal". In June 2013, Samuel L. Jackson expressed interest in guest starring as S.H.I.E.L.D. director Nick Fury, and subsequently appeared in the second episode "0-8-4". Jackson makes a second appearance in the season finale. During the episode "The Well", Chris Hemsworth appears as Thor via archival footage from Thor: The Dark World (2013). Maximiliano Hernández and Jaimie Alexander also reprise their film roles, Jasper Sitwell and Sif, respectively. Titus Welliver reprises the role of Felix Blake from the Marvel One-Shots short films.

=== Design ===
==== Storyboards ====
Storyboards were used throughout the season, to "put the director, stunts, camera, FX and the crew on the same page", though Joss Whedon did not use them for the pilot. One of the storyboard artists, Warren Drummond, noted the process was different to that on films, because there was limited time to complete the work, and because the storyboard artists were often working with different directors for each episode. Most of the sequences storyboarded were action or science fiction sequences.

==== Sets ====
The main recurring setting for the season is the Bus, a retrofitted Boeing C-17 Globemaster III, that serves as both the transportation and headquarters of the titular team. The Bus includes such features as a soundproof interrogation room, a forensics and research lab located on the lower deck, where Fitz and Simmons work, and a cargo hold directly outside the lab where the team parks its SUV and Lola (which stands for Levitating Over Land Automobile), Coulson's prized 1962 Chevrolet Corvette. When designing the Bus, production designer Gregory Melton began with the basic design and shape of a C-17, before adjusting it to serve the needs of the season. The main interior set does not have many obtrusions, allowing it to be seen completely at either end of the set; this was requested by Joss Whedon, which Melton called "a tall order" given it needed to include the command center, lounge, crew quarters and galley. Construction on the sets for the Bus's interior, interrogation room, and Fitz and Simmons's lab, which first appeared in the pilot and throughout the season, began on December 6, 2012.

Between the filming of the pilot and the start of the season filming, Melton was able to modify the sets, such as new flooring and equipment to the lab and additional lighting fixtures in the command center. Melton explained that because of the quick turnaround needed for the pilot, some details had to be sacrificed until the series was picked up for the season. Coulson's office set was also constructed, first appearing in "0-8-4", which was envisioned as a crow's nest, giving it Captain Nemo vibes. The lower level of the Bus is first seen in "Repairs", which Melton designed to be "a modular area of the plane that is full of pods... [that] we can do anything with", changing based on the episode's needs.

==== Costumes ====
According to costume designer Ann Foley, Coulson's suits, which she called "his armor", were more "streamlined" and a different cut than the ones he wore in the films, along with custom shirts and "slicker" ties. James Bond served as an early inspiration for Coulson's suits in the early part of the season, eventually shifting to a slim-cut suit. Additionally, Foley chose to avoid black suits and used solid shirts, another difference from the suits he wore in the films. Conversely to Coulson, Ward always wore black in order to look "leading-man sexy" according to Foley. May's flight suit was based on similar ones in the United States Air Force and featured "a tiny Y" 3D printed pattern that was the same used for Maria Hill's costume in The Avengers. For Skye, Foley wanted to set her apart from the other characters and looked to street-style blogs for design ideas. Skye's wardrobe was bright and vibrant at the start of the season, and slowly became more muted as the season went on to reflect her S.H.I.E.L.D. training and the season's darker tone. Foley tried to complement the styles for Fitz and Simmons, while not dressing them alike. Foley liked "to mix feminine elements with some masculine" such as floral prints "and the Peter-Pan collars with a tie and blazer". Simmons is also seen in her lab coat more than Fitz, since she is the biochemist. With Fitz, his costumes have "a little more heritage", wearing vests, cardigans, ties, plaid shirts, and jackets with patches on the elbows.

=== Filming ===
The pilot was produced almost entirely in Los Angeles to accommodate Joss Whedon's busy schedule, occurring from January 22 to February 11, 2013. The season resumed filming on July 17, also being produced in Los Angeles, as well as Culver City, California. Additional filming took place around the world, including in Paris, France, for "Pilot", Peru for "0-8-4", and in Stockholm, Sweden, for "Eye Spy".

The stunt coordinator for the season was Tanner Gill. Ming-Na Wen felt the stunt coordinators were able to "bring about [May's] skills" in a way that was believable. As with many Marvel projects, secrecy was a big issue. For instance, it was a challenge keeping Samuel L. Jackson's cameo in "0-8-4" a surprise due to "this age of tweets and spoilers". The showrunners had been exposed to this while working on The Avengers, but with their own series they were able to see "all the details that go into keeping everything under lock and key". Filming for the season concluded on April 9, 2014.

=== Visual effects ===
The visual effects supervisor for the season was Mark Kolpack, with Los Angeles-based visual effects company FuseFX the main visual effects vendor. Kevin Lingenfelser started the season focused on 2D supervising, but took over as lead in-house visual effects supervisor after episode eight from David Altenau. Two separate production management and creative teams were established to work on the show, with most of the episodes being worked on concurrently, either two or three at a time.

The Bus is a modified C17 transport plane. The digital model used in the series was designed and created by FuseFX.

For the Bus, Altenau explained that it "has all kinds of S.H.I.E.L.D. technology that is revealed over time as the series progresses. This includes an extra wing and engines in the rear giving the plane the ability to operate vertically for take-offs and landings, and even mid-flight u-turns ... FuseFX was given the opportunity to design the Bus. The design included many features from the start, such as the ability to do vertical take-offs and landing". FuseFX designed the Bus, and "Extreme attention was paid when designing the textures and rigging for this asset. Half a dozen 8k maps make up the details on the plane which allows the camera to get right up to the surface of the plane without any loss of detail. A very complex rig controls every aspect of the plane from the landing gear, engine transformation, doors opening, lighting and even the wings have flex controls for the animators to sell the weight of this massive aircraft. When the engines are in vertical flight mode they have several degrees of rotation which gives the jet a lot of maneuvering ability."

FuseFX also worked on Lola, Coulson's vintage 1962 Chevrolet Corvette which was described as "a classic car and beautiful in its own right, but through digital effects, Fuse has added hovercraft capabilities. When Coulson needs it, the wheel's rotate into a horizontal position, exposing hidden jet engine ducts that create lifting thrust through the rims of the tires, which double as turbo-fan blades. We worked closely with production to help design the mechanism and the look of the hovercraft engines. It's Stark technology designed to be consistent with the period aspect of the car." When the real Corvette is shown transitioning to its hover mode, volumetric dust, exhaust, and particle effects are added. Occasionally, FuseFX was required to use a fully digital model of the car, which matches the real vehicle precisely.

=== Music ===
In addition to the series' main theme for Coulson, Bear McCreary composed several other themes that he used throughout the season: themes for Mike Peterson and Project: Centipede were introduced in "Pilot", with Peterson's theme becoming "a distorted, metallic, angsty version" when he becomes Deathlok; a theme for the agents as a team was introduced in "0-8-4"; the Skye theme was introduced in "The Asset", which over the season changes from something "sentimental and emotional" into something "really bittersweet,... tragic", and heroic; a theme for both Fitz and Simmons together was introduced in "FZZT"; a theme for Victoria Hand and The Hub, which served as the theme for "Big S.H.I.E.L.D.", as opposed to Coulson's "little S.H.I.E.L.D." team, was introduced in "The Hub"; and individual themes for each of member of Coulson's team and "the Clairvoyant", which shifts to John Garrett when he is revealed to be "the Clairvoyant". McCreary felt the themes were not "just for specific characters" but a way to help "follow the narrative thread as the themes are transposed from one person to another". McCreary opted not to reprise any themes from the films during the season, notably composing his own themes for the Tesseract and Asgard, which he acknowledged had already appeared in several films. The soundtrack titled Marvel's Agents of S.H.I.E.L.D. (Original Soundtrack Album) featuring music from the first and second seasons, was released by Marvel Music digitally on September 4, 2015, and on CD in October 2015.

=== Marvel Cinematic Universe tie-ins ===
In June 2013, Clark Gregg explained how the series would tie into the Marvel Cinematic Universe films: "...the exciting part is going to be seeing the way that Agents of S.H.I.E.L.D. interacts with the S.H.I.E.L.D. component in Captain America 2 (2014), and the other movies, and whether those movies will then affect our show". Joss Whedon did state that the show would be autonomous from The Avengers, saying "It's gotta be a show that works for people who haven't seen the Marvel movies. It will please Marvel fans, I think." He reiterated that sentiment in an interview at the 2012 Toronto International Film Festival, explaining "It's new characters. It needs to be its own thing. It needs to be adjacent [to The Avengers]... What does S.H.I.E.L.D. have that the other superheroes don't? And that, to me, is that they're not superheroes, but they live in that universe. Even though they're a big organization, that [lack of powers] makes them underdogs, and that's interesting to me."

Ultimately, the season featured several tie-in episodes with Marvel Cinematic Universe films: the episode "The Well" takes place directly after the events of Thor: The Dark World (2013); the episode "T.A.H.I.T.I." introduces the alien race the Kree to the MCU (confirmed as such in the second season), members of which play a significant role in Guardians of the Galaxy (2014); and the episodes "End of the Beginning" and "Turn, Turn, Turn" revolve around the events of Captain America: The Winter Soldier. Due to Captain America: The Winter Soldier revealing that Hydra had infiltrated S.H.I.E.L.D. with sleeper agents, the season sees a retooling for the final six episodes. Regarding the synergy the show has with addressing events from the films, Loeb said "It's an extremely unique experience that doesn't exist anywhere else out there in the entertainment business". The characters simultaneously face Hydra and a power struggle within S.H.I.E.L.D., and trust issues with each other. Jed Whedon added that that Hydra sleeper agents, which the show could not address until after the release of The Winter Soldier, was an attempt to address the lack of characters from the comics, a complaint fans had throughout the season.

== Marketing ==
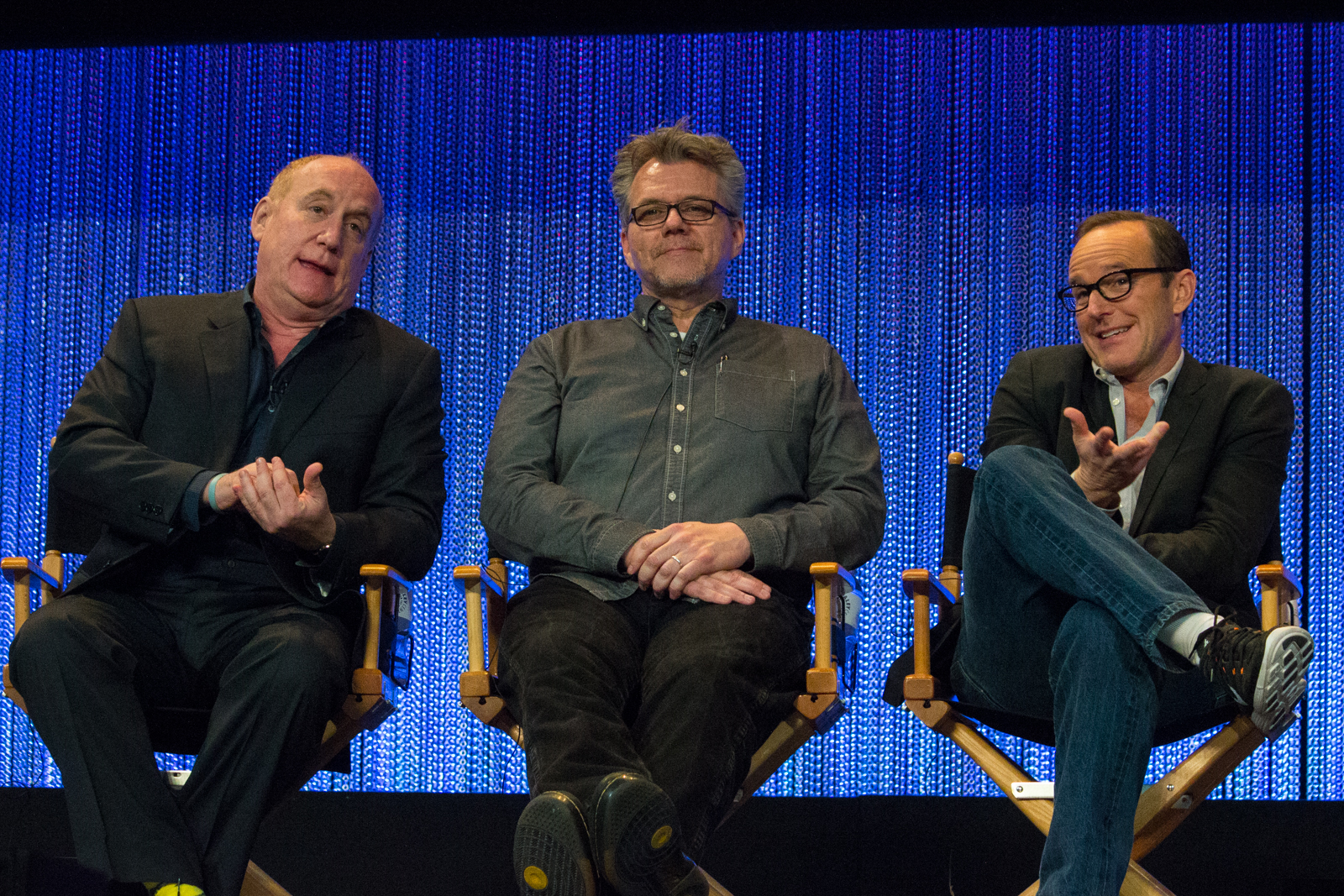
Executive producers Loeb (L) and Bell (M) along with Gregg (R) at PaleyFest 2014, where the episode "End of the Beginning" was screened.

Three episodes were screened before their initial air dates: "Pilot" at San Diego Comic-Con on July 19, 2013, "Eye Spy" at New York Comic Con on October 12, 2013, and "End of the Beginning" at Marvel's PaleyFest panel for the series on March 23, 2014. In September 2013, ABC announced the weekly companion digital aftershow, Agents of S.H.I.E.L.D.: Declassified, hosted by Brett Erlich. The series aired on ABC.com, Marvel.com, WatchABC.com, and the Watch ABC app from September 24, 2013, to May 13, 2014, comprising 23 episodes. Three expanded installments with guests were planned for the first season for its more "provocative storylines". Verizon Wireless served as Declassified's sponsor and created a hub featuring the aftershow alongside "live social feeds, Twitter polling, and sharable clips and graphics". Verizon was also the presenting sponsor of Agents of S.H.I.E.L.D. on Watch ABC. Beginning with "T.A.H.I.T.I.", all episodes leading up to The Winter Soldier crossover were marketed as Agents of S.H.I.E.L.D.: Uprising. On March 18, 2014, ABC aired a one-hour television special titled Marvel Studios: Assembling a Universe in the place of an Agents of S.H.I.E.L.D. episode. The special included promotional footage for then unaired episodes of the season.

=== "The Art of Level Seven" ===
For the final six episodes, Marvel began the "Marvel's Agents of S.H.I.E.L.D.: The Art of Level Seven" initiative, in which a different image was released each Thursday before a new episode, depicting a first look at a key event from the upcoming episode. Bell stated that the initiative was a way to tie the series back to its comics roots, and was thought of at the beginning of the season. The production team tried to pair specific artists to the teaser posters based on their previous work and how it connected to the themes and emotion of the intended episode. The art also appeared as variant covers to select titles published by Marvel Comics in August 2014. Jeph Loeb stated, "It's exciting to bring this art to life once more, exclusively at comic book stores, and to give fans a chance to own the Marvel's Agents of S.H.I.E.L.D. art in a different format."

The poster for "Turn, Turn, Turn", created by Mike del Mundo, depicts a maze forming the S.H.I.E.L.D. logo and show title, with a rat inside. The poster for "Providence", created by Paolo Rivera, highlights the rise of Hydra by showing a melded Hydra and S.H.I.E.L.D. logo, and depicts the team divided by Coulson, Raina, and Ward. The poster for "The Only Light in the Darkness", created by Pascal Campion, focuses on Coulson and his cellist lover, Audrey Nathan, while also hinting at the villain for the episode, Marcus Daniels. The poster for "Nothing Personal", created by Stephanie Hans, shows Skye and Ward with Deathlok above them and the S.H.I.E.L.D. logo in the background. The poster for "Ragtag" was created by Emma Ríos is an amalgamation of Ward's life, Fitz–Simmons in danger, and Skye behind the S.H.I.E.L.D. logo. The poster for "Beginning of the End", created by Phantom City Creative, recalls the first, official poster, but changes the order of the characters, their clothing, and palette. Above them is a broken S.H.I.E.L.D. logo that reveal's Hydra's, which emits light that reflects onto Ward.

== Release ==
=== Broadcast ===
Along with the premiere in the United States on ABC, the season began airing in Canada on CTV on September 24, 2013. In the United Kingdom, the season debuted three days later on Channel 4, while it began airing on the Seven Network in Australia on October 2, 2013, and in New Zealand on TV2 on February 16, 2014.

=== Home media ===
The season was released on September 9, 2014, on Blu-ray and DVD. Bonus features included behind-the-scenes featurettes, audio commentary, deleted scenes, a blooper reel, as well as the television special, Marvel Studios: Assembling a Universe. On November 20, 2014, the season began streaming on Netflix in the United States, and was available until February 28, 2022. It became available on Disney+ in the United States on March 16, 2022, joining other territories where it was already available on the service.

== Reception ==
=== Ratings ===
Viewership and ratings per episode of Agents of S.H.I.E.L.D. season 1
No.	Title	Air date	Rating/share (18–49)	Viewers (millions)	DVR (18–49)	DVR viewers (millions)	Total (18–49)	Total viewers (millions)
1	"Pilot"	September 24, 2013	4.7/14	12.12	2.3	4.89	7.0	17.01
2	"0-8-4"	October 1, 2013	3.3/10	8.66	2.1	4.50	5.4	13.17
3	"The Asset"	October 8, 2013	2.9/9	7.87	1.9	4.15	4.8	12.01
4	"Eye Spy"	October 15, 2013	2.8/8	7.85	1.7	3.75	4.5	11.60
5	"Girl in the Flower Dress"	October 22, 2013	2.7/8	7.39	1.7	3.76	4.4	11.16
6	"FZZT"	November 5, 2013	2.5/7	7.15	1.7	3.79	4.2	10.93
7	"The Hub"	November 12, 2013	2.2/6	6.67	1.6	3.46	3.8	10.13
8	"The Well"	November 19, 2013	2.4/7	6.89	1.6	3.42	4.0	10.31
9	"Repairs"	November 26, 2013	2.6/8	9.69	1.3	3.06	3.9	12.75
10	"The Bridge"	December 10, 2013	2.1/6	6.11	1.3	3.05	3.4	9.16
11	"The Magical Place"	January 7, 2014	2.2/6	6.63	1.4	3.02	3.6	9.65
12	"Seeds"	January 14, 2014	2.2/6	6.37	1.5	3.22	3.7	9.59
13	"T.R.A.C.K.S."	February 4, 2014	2.2/6	6.62	1.4	3.15	3.6	9.77
14	"T.A.H.I.T.I."	March 4, 2014	1.8/6	5.46	1.4	3.11	3.2	8.58
15	"Yes Men"	March 11, 2014	2.1/7	5.99	1.4	3.08	3.5	9.07
16	"End of the Beginning"	April 1, 2014	2.0/6	5.71	1.4	3.16	3.4	8.88
17	"Turn, Turn, Turn"	April 8, 2014	1.9/6	5.37	1.5	3.46	3.4	8.83
18	"Providence"	April 15, 2014	2.1/6	5.52	—N/a	—N/a	—N/a	—N/a (Note: The DVR gains for "Providence" were not in the top 25 for the week, and so were not reported by TV by the Numbers.)
19	"The Only Light in the Darkness"	April 22, 2014	1.9/6	6.04	1.4	2.98	3.3	9.02
20	"Nothing Personal"	April 29, 2014	2.1/6	5.95	1.2	2.89	3.3	8.84
21	"Ragtag"	May 6, 2014	1.9/6	5.37	1.3	2.95	3.2	8.32
22	"Beginning of the End"	May 13, 2014	2.0/7	5.45	1.3	3.13	3.3	8.58

As of September 30, 2013, an estimated 22.1 million viewers have watched the premiere episode in the US through live, DVR, encore, and online viewing. This was the highest ratings received by the first episode of a drama series in the United States for almost four years since the pilot episode of ABC's V. In Canada, the premiere saw 2.706 million viewers, the third highest viewership for the week on the network. In the United Kingdom, the episode debuted as the highest rated drama launch of the year, averaging 3.23 million viewers including the +1 channel and recordings viewed the same night, a share of 14.8 percent of people watching TV in the UK at the time. The premiere in Australia was watched by 1.3 million viewers, the top show of the night. In New Zealand, the episode premiered to 326,790 viewers, the fourth highest show of the night, and the most watched show on TV2. By the time the full season was picked up by ABC it ranked as the number one new series of the 2013–14 television season among adults 18–49. The season averaged 8.31 million total viewers, ranking 43rd among network series. It also had an average total 18-49 rating of 3.0, which was 20th.

=== Critical response ===
The review aggregator website Rotten Tomatoes reports an 88% approval rating with an average score of 7.80/10, based on 72 reviews. The website's consensus reads, "Marvel's Agents of S.H.I.E.L.D. is sure to please comic book fans, but the strong ensemble and brisk pacing help to make this better-than-average superhero show accessible to non-fanboys as well." Metacritic, which uses a weighted average, assigned a score of 74 out of 100 based on 33 reviews, indicating "generally favorable" reviews.

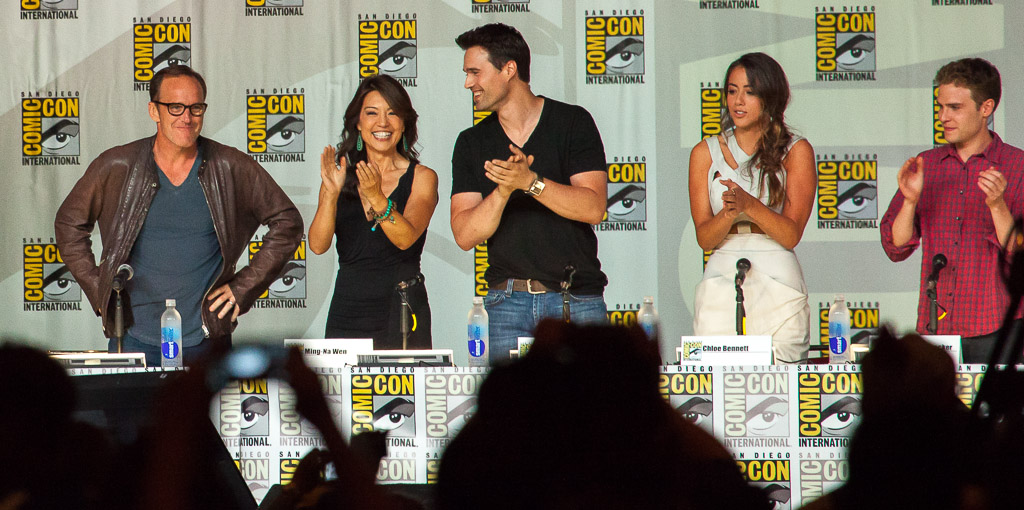
(L to R) Gregg, Wen, Dalton, Bennet and De Caestecker were among those on the 2013 San Diego Comic-Con panel, where the pilot was screened to a positive crowd reaction.

The early screening of the pilot at San Diego Comic-Con was met with a very positive reaction from the crowd. Critically, the initial screening of the pilot was met with mostly positive reviews, though The New York Times' Brooks Barnes noted that "what goes over well at Comic-Con does not necessarily work in the real world", especially on a network with "Scandal moms and Dancing with the Stars grandparents". Entertainment Weekly's initial reactions were that if everything that made the show appealing— its continuity with the Marvel Cinematic Universe, its continuance of The Avengers storyline, and Whedon's return to television, were stripped from it, the show would still work. However, they also questioned whether the show was accessible enough to attract a wider audience.

Evan Valentine, writing for Collider, divided the season into highs and lows: highs included the Captain America: The Winter Soldier crossover, with Valentine noting that "The creators had clearly known this moment was coming ... and did a great job of capitalizing [on] it", as well as other tie-ins with the Marvel Cinematic Universe, and he praised Gregg's performance, stating "What made us fall in love with the character from the first Iron Man to his death in The Avengers is still alive and kicking"; lows of the season included the episodes before the Winter Soldier tie-in, with Valentine feeling that the series "became the show that had to stall its developments and character building to make way for the [tie-in]." He also criticized the rest of the main cast, though he did approve of the guest and supporting cast members, and he criticized the series' use of minor comic book characters and concepts, singling out the costume design for Deathlok as "horrid" and not scary. Eric Goldman of IGN gave the season a 7.5 out of 10, calling it "a fun, lighthearted, but fairly disposable piece of entertainment", noting that it improved through the season, especially following the Captain America: The Winter Soldier tie-in, and that by the end of the season, the series "was starting to come into its own". Though he found the main cast's performances to all be good, and praised the strong guest and recurring stars, Goldman found the main characterizations to be weak during the first half of the season, and he also criticized the pacing of certain overarching plotlines, noting "the mystery of Coulson's return, Skye's parentage, etc. – moved far too slow, with relatively minor revelations treated as though they were big reveals".

Jim Steranko, an artist and writer who worked on the Nick Fury, Agent of S.H.I.E.L.D. comic between 1966 and 1968, was critical of the pilot episode, lamenting that "the show had no menace, no tension". For the second episode, Steranko said that it was "too unfocused to be satisfying" but praised Jackson's cameo as Nick Fury as "an electrifying reminder of what the series could and should be". In contrast, Steranko's opinion of some later episodes in the first season were more positive, congratulating the writer and director of "The End of the Beginning" for "finding an entertaining, bravura groove that finally brings the concept to life", and saying of the next episode "I was concerned that last week's bravura transformation was only a fluke, but it was apparent from the opening moments that the exec lineup's new image-and-edit policy was in play". Overall, however, he found season one to be "22 episodes of 'sanctified' plot and character crumbs being salted with terminally-sluggish velocity (into anemic 'standalone' stories)".

=== Analysis ===
Both the way the series was affected by the destruction of S.H.I.E.L.D. in Captain America: The Winter Soldier and the way its characters are depicted rebuilding the organization have been noted by some:

Terri Schwartz, writing for Zap2it following the airing of "Nothing Personal", called the series "incredible", stating that it "got off to a rocky start", but that changed once the Winter Soldier tie-in took place. Schwartz felt that the season earned many of its early criticisms from having to "bide time" until the crossover, but "Now that it has the freedom to be the series it was always intended to, Marvel's Agents of S.H.I.E.L.D. has turned into a fantastic show. Its connection to Marvel's Cinematic Universe is clear: This is where viewers get to see the fallout of Hydra's S.H.I.E.L.D. infiltration. And the fact that the movie so influenced the show is game-changing in terms of how the mediums of film and television can be interwoven."

Merrill Barr, reviewing "Beginning of the End" for Forbes, reiterated this sentiment, stating that "the series finally stands its ground and stakes its claim as a member of the Marvel Cinematic Universe ... By establishing world changing consequences that don't just affect one MCU franchise, but all of them." He continues saying that "what Marvel's daring to say with this season finale is 'everything we do matters, and you need to pay attention to all of it.' ... It's been a long journey, and there's no question many viewers' patience wore thin toward the end, but that never stopped Marvel from pushing forward to one of the most entertaining hours of television this season and finally cementing a deserved place on the small screen."

Mary McNamara of the Los Angeles Times felt that the series "created a whole new sort of television show: One that must support, and change with, the plot twists of its film family ... never before has television been literally married to film, charged with filling in the back story and creating the connective tissue of an ongoing film franchise." She stated that the Captain America: The Winter Soldier crossover "infused S.H.I.E.L.D. with a new energy, and helped explain, perhaps, why the show took so long to find its footing—in the writers' room at least ... That Agents of S.H.I.E.L.D. was able to succeed as a story both independent and ancillary is all but miraculous." She concluded that the series "is now not only a very good show in its own right, it's part of Marvel's multiplatform city-state. It faces a future of perpetual re-invention, and that puts it in the exhilarating first car of television's roller-coaster ride toward possible world domination."

=== Accolades ===
Year	Award	Category	Nominee(s)	Result	Ref.
2013	Critics' Choice Television Awards	Most Exciting New Series	Agents of S.H.I.E.L.D.	Won	
2014	People's Choice Awards	Favorite Actress in a New TV Series	Ming-Na Wen	Nominated	
2014	People's Choice Awards	Favorite New TV Drama	Agents of S.H.I.E.L.D.	Nominated	
2014	Visual Effects Society Awards	Outstanding Visual Effects in a Broadcast Program	"Pilot"	Nominated	
2014	Golden Reel Awards	Best Sound Editing – Short Form: Music	"Pilot"	Nominated	
2014	Satellite Awards	Best Television Series or Miniseries, Genre	Agents of S.H.I.E.L.D.	Nominated	
2014	Saturn Award	Best Network Television Series Release	Agents of S.H.I.E.L.D.	Nominated	
2014	Teen Choice Awards	Male Breakout Star	Brett Dalton	Won	
2014	Primetime Creative Arts Emmy Awards	Outstanding Special Visual Effects	"T.A.H.I.T.I."	Nominated	
