= Turn, Turn, Turn (Agents of S.H.I.E.L.D.) =

- Agents of S.H.I.E.L.D. episode
- "The Art of Level Seven" poster for the episode
- Episode no.: Season 1 Episode 17
- Directed by: Vincent Misiano
- Written by: Jed Whedon; Maurissa Tancharoen
- Cinematography by: Feliks Parnell
- Editing by: Joshua Charson
- Original air date: April 8, 2014
- Running time: 42 minutes

Guest appearances
- Bill Paxton as John Garrett; Saffron Burrows as Victoria Hand; B. J. Britt as Antoine Triplett; Christine Adams as Anne Weaver

Episode chronology
| ← Previous "End of the Beginning" | Next → "Providence" |
- Agents of S.H.I.E.L.D. season 1

"Turn, Turn, Turn" is the seventeenth episode of the first season of the American television series Agents of S.H.I.E.L.D. Based on the Marvel Comics organization S.H.I.E.L.D., it follows Phil Coulson and his team of S.H.I.E.L.D. agents as they discover the infiltration of their organization by Hydra. It is set in the Marvel Cinematic Universe (MCU) and acknowledges the franchise's films. The episode was written by Jed Whedon and Maurissa Tancharoen, and directed by Vincent Misiano.

Clark Gregg reprises his role as Coulson from the film series, and is joined by series regulars Ming-Na Wen, Brett Dalton, Chloe Bennet, Iain De Caestecker, and Elizabeth Henstridge. The episode ties-into the film Captain America: The Winter Soldier, taking place concurrently with it and being affected by its events, including the revelation that main character Grant Ward (Dalton) and recurring character John Garrett (Bill Paxton) are members of Hydra.

"Turn, Turn, Turn" originally aired on ABC on April 8, 2014, and according to Nielsen Media Research, was watched by 5.37 million viewers.

== Plot ==
Following the events of "End of the Beginning", and concurrently with Captain America: The Winter Soldier, after a coded message is sent out on every S.H.I.E.L.D. wavelength, the Bus is remotely hijacked by Victoria Hand and summoned to the Hub. She also sends drones to take out John Garrett's jet, but Phil Coulson shoots the drones down and rescues Garrett. Melinda May reveals that she knew the truth about Coulson's resurrection and was monitoring him on Nick Fury's orders, and he refuses to trust her any more.

Skye deciphers the coded message, learning that it is intended to instigate an uprising within S.H.I.E.L.D., instructing Hydra sleeper agents to come out of hiding. Attempting to contact Fury, May learns of his death. Taking vital information with them on a drive encrypted by Skye (including details on GH325), Coulson, May, Skye, Leo Fitz, Grant Ward and Garrett allow the Bus to be captured by Hand (whom they believe to be the Clairvoyant), escaping into the Hub. Meanwhile, Jemma Simmons and Antoine Triplett learn of the uprising from Anne Weaver upon trying to contact her for help after finding the GH325 in Skye's blood. Hand captures them and reveals that she is not a Hydra agent, but believes Coulson is due to his recent suspicious behavior.

Ward and Skye plan to take out the Hub's systems with explosives, and on their way to do so they admit their feelings for each other and share a kiss, after Skye reveals she knew about his relationship with May. The rest of the team seek Hand, but when Garrett insists they kill her and mentions the Clairvoyant's crimes, including using the mind probe on Raina, Coulson, who never shared that information, realizes Garrett is the true Clairvoyant. Assisted by other Hydra infiltrators, Garrett takes Coulson, May and Fitz captive, but the explosion caused by Ward and Skye enables them to escape, overpowering Garrett and killing his men.

Hand takes Garrett and the other Hydra infiltrators within the Hub into custody. With Hydra exposed to the rest of S.H.I.E.L.D. and the world, Hand leaves Coulson in command of the Hub while she and Ward escort Garrett to the Fridge, hoping to secure the facility before Hydra captures it. Hand offers Ward the chance to execute Garrett, but he instead kills Hand and frees Garrett, revealing his own allegiance to Hydra.

== Production ==
=== Development ===
In March 2014, Marvel revealed that the seventeenth episode would be titled "Turn, Turn, Turn", and would be written by executive producers Jed Whedon and Maurissa Tancharoen, with Vincent Misiano directing. The triple "turn" in the title refers to Hydra, Garrett, and Ward.

=== Writing ===
On the stakes of the overarching story at this point, executive producer Jeffrey Bell said, "if you look at a 22 episode season as a movie, we're in the 3rd act of the movie. And from here on, its just full on action and urgency and momentum, and sometimes it takes awhile to set everything up, but we think we're going to bring all those dominoes together really nicely for here through [episode] 22." Whedon explained that from the start, the writers knew the Hydra twist would need to have "a personal price to it" either with a death or a turn. Supervising producer Brent Fletcher felt it would have been "disingenuous" if a member of Coulson's team did not turn out to be Hydra, and added there was greater impact revealing it in this episode opposed to in the final episode of the season.

Brett Dalton first learned of his character Grant Ward's allegiance to Hydra during the shooting of "Yes Men", when the executive producers and writers told him of the twist, on which he said, "I just sat there with my jaw open for the next 20 minutes, and they just did all of the talking because I couldn't say anything. It was a huge turn. I didn't see any of that coming, so I was just shock [sic] for about the next day. Then it sank in and I started to think wow, what a cool opportunity. Because the Ward I thought I was going to be playing for the next few seasons, the whole thing just changed....I think it fulfilled a promise of his past. We got from the very beginning, [when] he's talking to Coulson about how he has a troubled past and the whole revelation that he doesn't play well with others. [In "The Hub"], we get bits and pieces of this troubled past. This delivers on it in an interesting way that nobody sees coming."

=== Casting ===
In March 2014, Marvel revealed that main cast members Clark Gregg, Ming-Na Wen, Brett Dalton, Chloe Bennet, Iain De Caestecker, and Elizabeth Henstridge would star as Phil Coulson, Melinda May, Grant Ward, Skye, Leo Fitz, and Jemma Simmons, respectively. It was also revealed that the guest cast for the episode would include Bill Paxton as Agent John Garrett, Saffron Burrows as Victoria Hand, Christine Adams as Agent Anne Weaver, B. J. Britt as Agent Antoine Triplett, Charles Halford as Agent Shaw, James Macdonald as Agent Jacobson, Dayo Ade as Agent Barbour, Kylie Furneaux as Agent Shade, Alex Daniels as Agent Chaimson, Braden Moran as Agent Jones, Cameron Diskin as Agent Baylin. Halford, Furneaux, Daniels, Moran, and Diskin did not receive guest star credit in the episode. Paxton, Burrows, Adams, Britt, and Halford reprise their roles from earlier in the series.

=== Filming ===
Filming occurred from January 30 to February 7, 2014.

=== Music ===
For the episode, composer Bear McCreary had to make sense of several character themes that he had created throughout the first season. "The Centipede Theme", also known as "The Clairvoyant Theme", was introduced in the pilot episode to represent the Centipede organization and its mysterious leader. With the introduction of Paxton as John Garrett in "T.A.H.I.T.I.", McCreary wrote a "The Garrett Theme" representing his "cocky, confident and...militaristic energy". When "Turn, Turn, Turn" reveals that Garrett is actually the Clairvoyant, McCreary "had a bit of a thematic mess on my hands. The Clairvoyant Theme and the Garrett Theme are completely musically dissimilar, and are now representing the same person! Complicating matters, up to this point in the episode, every mention of Hydra was being accompanied by quotations of the Big S.H.I.E.L.D. (or Victoria Hand) Theme, because she was the target of Coulson's suspicions. From the moment Garrett admits he is loyal to Hydra I had to make sense of these themes and redefine the musical rules moving forward." McCreary decided to essentially retire the "Big S.H.I.E.L.D. Theme" (introduced in "The Hub"), helped by the fact that Hand is killed in the episode. McCreary then made "The Centipede Theme" serve as the theme for Hydra, given that organization's introduction in this episode and its ties to Centipede and Garrett in the story. Garrett's theme continues to represent that character in scenes just about him, with McCreary finding "Paxton's performance after being revealed as the Clairvoyant [to be] even more fun and energetic. So, his theme still fits him perfectly, it just shows us a different side of his personality."

McCreary also introduced a new melody, "a simple piece for guitar and rhythm section", in the scene where Garrett and the other members of Hydra are taken away while the series' main and recurring characters react to the revelation of their betrayal. On the piece McCreary said, "I'm not sure we're going to hear this melody again, so I haven't even bothered to give it a name. It works so well in this singular moment." For the final scenes, in which Ward reveals his true allegiance by killing Hand, McCreary used only "deep, horrifying synth tones", as he and the producers did not want to "clutter these scenes with themes, melodies or emotions. We just wanted to emphasize the pure shock, and leave the audience feeling dazed at this final unexpected turn."

=== Marvel Cinematic Universe tie-ins ===
Because the film Captain America: The Winter Soldier depicts the destruction of S.H.I.E.L.D. following the revelation that the terrorist group Hydra has infiltrated the former, the episode and those following it are significantly affected by it, showing the series' characters dealing with this turn of events themselves. Executive producer Jeph Loeb noted that "It's an extremely unique experience that doesn't exist anywhere else out there in the entertainment business." The episode also reveals that a device, dubbed the "Mouse Hole" here, that was used by several characters in the film was created prior to the start of the series by the character Leo Fitz.

== Release ==
=== Broadcast ===
"Turn, Turn, Turn" was first aired in the United States on ABC on April 8, 2014.

=== Marketing ===
Beginning with the episode "T.A.H.I.T.I.", all episodes leading up to the release of Captain America: The Winter Soldier and the series' crossover with that film were marketed as Agents of S.H.I.E.L.D.: Uprising. For the final six episodes, Marvel began the "Marvel's Agents of S.H.I.E.L.D.: The Art of Level Seven" initiative, in which a different image was released each Thursday before a new episode, depicting a first look at a key event from the upcoming episode. Bell stated that the initiative was a way to tie the series back to its comics roots, and was thought of at the beginning of the season. The production team tried to pair specific artists to the teaser posters based on their previous work and how it connected to the themes and emotion of the intended episode.

The poster for "Turn, Turn, Turn", created by Mike del Mundo, depicts a maze forming the S.H.I.E.L.D. logo and show title, with a rat inside, hinting ominously at S.H.I.E.L.D.'s corruption and a possible traitor. Del Mundo said the idea for the poster "was to tell the story of mistrust, confusion and S.H.I.E.L.D. being compromised without giving away too much". Including the rat helped to tell "that part of the story" without spoiling the episode's events. Bell added that from the previous episode "the team came to some realizations and conclusions where we think it's a high level S.H.I.E.L.D. agent, and so the idea of S.H.I.E.L.D. being a maze and that there's a rat in the maze and no one trusting anyone...[does] a great job of capturing that."

=== Home media ===
The episode, along with the rest of Agents of S.H.I.E.L.D.'s first season, was released on Blu-ray and DVD on September 9, 2014. Bonus features include behind-the-scenes featurettes, audio commentary, deleted scenes, and a blooper reel. On November 20, 2014, the episode became available for streaming on Netflix. The episode, along with the rest of the series, was removed from Netflix on February 28, 2022, and later became available on Disney+ on March 16, 2022.

== Reception ==
=== Ratings ===
In the United States the episode received a 1.9/6 percent share among adults between the ages of 18 and 49, meaning that it was seen by 1.9 percent of all households, and 6 percent of all of those watching television at the time of the broadcast. It was watched by 5.37 million viewers.

=== Accolades ===
In June 2016, IGN ranked the episode as the seventh best in the series.
