= Nothing Personal (Agents of S.H.I.E.L.D.) =

- Agents of S.H.I.E.L.D. episode
- "The Art of Level Seven" poster for the episode
- Episode no.: Season 1 Episode 20
- Directed by: Billy Gierhart
- Written by: Paul Zbyszewski; DJ Doyle
- Cinematography by: Feliks Parnell
- Editing by: Joshua Charson
- Original air date: April 29, 2014
- Running time: 43 minutes

Guest appearances
- J. August Richards as Mike Peterson / Deathlok; B. J. Britt as Antoine Triplett; Adrian Pasdar as Glenn Talbot; Cobie Smulders as Maria Hill

Episode chronology
← Previous "The Only Light in the Darkness"	Next → "Ragtag"
- Agents of S.H.I.E.L.D. season 1

"Nothing Personal" is the twentieth episode of the first season of the American television series Agents of S.H.I.E.L.D. Based on the Marvel Comics organization S.H.I.E.L.D., it follows Phil Coulson and his team of S.H.I.E.L.D. agents as they learn of a traitor in their team. It is set in the Marvel Cinematic Universe (MCU) and acknowledges the franchise's films. The episode was written by Paul Zbyszewski and DJ Doyle, and directed by Billy Gierhart.

Clark Gregg reprises his role as Coulson from the film series, and is joined by series regulars Ming-Na Wen, Brett Dalton, Chloe Bennet, Iain De Caestecker, and Elizabeth Henstridge. Special guest star Cobie Smulders returns as Maria Hill, also reprising her role from the film series.

"Nothing Personal" originally aired on ABC on April 29, 2014, and according to Nielsen Media Research, was watched by 5.95 million viewers.

== Plot ==
Maria Hill leaves a debrief with Congress regarding S.H.I.E.L.D., speaking with Pepper Potts about the day's events and the obvious tails following her. The tails are suddenly incapacitated, and Hill finds herself facing Melinda May in an alleyway. May asks Hill to help Phil Coulson, expressing her concerns that Coulson may be compromised and Hydra leader Alexander Pierce may have been behind his neural "reprogramming" in the T.A.H.I.T.I. program. May asks to speak with Director Nick Fury and Hill insists he is dead, which May does not believe.

In the Providence bunker, the agents are watching footage that demonstrates that May has left the team, and that Grant Ward and Skye left together, hand-in-hand, on the Bus. Agent Eric Koenig is nowhere to be found. Confused by the events, the team disperses to make dinner, when Leo Fitz discovers a hidden message from Skye that says "Ward is Hydra". At the same time, Jemma Simmons finds Koenig's body. Realizing that Skye has uncovered Ward's duplicity, the team, after overcoming their shock, decide to pursue Ward to rescue Skye. As they prepare to leave, US Special forces led by Colonel Glenn Talbot swarm the Providence bunker - Agent Hill has led them to Coulson's location.

Talbot threatens prison for Coulson's team, but Coulson informs Hill of Ward's betrayal. She and Coulson incapacitate the Special Forces, and the team heads out to intercept Skye and Ward. Skye, in the meantime, has led Ward to the diner where she first met Mike Peterson / Deathlok and is delaying the decryption of her hard drive. While stalling, she alerts the Police to their whereabouts, and the police attempt to apprehend the two S.H.I.E.L.D. agents. Ward overpowers them, but Skye attempts to flee in a Police vehicle. However, she is stopped by Deathlok, who takes her back to the Bus.

She refuses to help Ward and Deathlok decrypt the hard drive, and expresses her hatred of Ward, despite his insistence that his feelings for her are real. Deathlok uses one of his weapons to induce a heart attack by "stopping" Ward's heart, and Skye gives in to save him, agreeing to decrypt the drive. She reveals that the hard drive encryption is tied to altitude, stating that they must be at 35,000 feet (11,000 m) for the drive to unlock. While preparing to take off, Ward is confronted by Hill in John Garrett's old aircraft, who threatens him, but Ward calls her bluff stating that Coulson would never risk Skye, and takes off anyway. However, Hill's delay allowed Coulson time to sneak on board via the wheel well.

Coulson finds Skye and plans to take down Ward, but he doesn't know about Deathlok's presence. That necessitates a new plan; running away. Skye and Coulson retreat to Lola and, under fire from Ward and Deathlok, drop out of the sky and plummet towards LA. Lola's thrusters kick in at the last second and they fly to the ground.

Deathlok then attempts to convince Ward to let them go now that the drive is decrypting on Garrett's orders, but Ward refuses. The team retires to a hotel, where Skye reveals she left a trap in the hard drive. Later, May returns and shows Coulson the contents of a flash drive she recovered from his "grave," specifically a message to Fury from the director of T.A.H.I.T.I. The file is a video of Coulson himself informing Fury that T.A.H.I.T.I. must be shut down because of horrific side effects the drugs had on test subjects, which could only be mitigated by erasing the victim's memory of what happened.

== Production ==
=== Development and writing ===
In April 2014, Marvel revealed that the twentieth episode would be titled "Nothing Personal", and would be written by Paul Zbyszewski and DJ Doyle, with Billy Gierhart directing. The visual of the team staying at a motel while on the run was meant to be contrasted against the presence of "big S.H.I.E.L.D." from "End of the Beginning" when all the established agents appear.

=== Casting ===
In April 2014, Marvel revealed that main cast members Clark Gregg, Ming-Na Wen, Brett Dalton, Chloe Bennet, Iain De Caestecker, and Elizabeth Henstridge would star as Phil Coulson, Melinda May, Grant Ward, Skye, Leo Fitz, and Jemma Simmons, respectively. It was also revealed that the guest cast for the episode would include J. August Richards as Mike Peterson / Deathlok, Cobie Smulders as Agent Maria Hill, Adrian Pasdar as Colonel Glenn Talbot, B. J. Britt as Agent Antoine Triplett and Josh Breeding as parking attendant. Breeding did not receive guest star credit in the episode. Richards, Smulders, Pasdar, and Britt reprise their roles from earlier in the series.

=== Filming ===
Filming occurred from March 6 to 17, 2014.

=== Marvel Cinematic Universe tie-ins ===
The episode features the first mention of Man-Thing in the MCU, though his comic wife Ellen Brandt appeared in Iron Man 3 portrayed by Stéphanie Szostak. The mention comes from Hill, who Smulders previously portrayed in The Avengers and Captain America: The Winter Soldier, as she has a phone conversation with Pepper Potts, who is portrayed in the films by Gwyneth Paltrow.

== Release ==
=== Broadcast ===
"Nothing Personal" was first aired in the United States on ABC on April 29, 2014.

=== Marketing ===
For the final six episodes, Marvel began the "Marvel's Agents of S.H.I.E.L.D.: The Art of Level Seven" initiative, in which a different image was released each Thursday before a new episode, depicting a first look at a key event from the upcoming episode. Bell stated that the initiative was a way to tie the series back to its comics roots, and was thought of at the beginning of the season. The production team tried to pair specific artists to the teaser posters based on their previous work and how it connected to the themes and emotion of the intended episode. The poster for "Nothing Personal", created by Stephanie Hans, highlights Skye and Ward in a depiction of a moment from the episode, with Deathlok looming over them, and the S.H.I.E.L.D. logo in the background. Hans said she wanted to show "the shock and pain of having to choose between hurting somebody or betraying your team" which is what Skye was going through. Hans added that even though Skye is hold Ward in the poster "with all her might, she couldn't be more alone".

=== Home media ===
The episode, along with the rest of Agents of S.H.I.E.L.D.'s first season, was released on Blu-ray and DVD on September 9, 2014. Bonus features include behind-the-scenes featurettes, audio commentary, deleted scenes, and a blooper reel. On November 20, 2014, the episode became available for streaming on Netflix. The episode, along with the rest of the series, was removed from Netflix on February 28, 2022, and later became available on Disney+ on March 16, 2022.

== Reception ==
=== Ratings ===
In the United States the episode received a 2.1/6 percent share among adults between the ages of 18 and 49, meaning that it was seen by 2.1 percent of all households, and 6 percent of all of those watching television at the time of the broadcast. It was watched by 5.95 million viewers.
