= The Well (Agents of S.H.I.E.L.D.) =

- Agents of S.H.I.E.L.D. episode
- Episode no.: Season 1 Episode 8
- Directed by: Jonathan Frakes
- Written by: Monica Owusu-Breen
- Cinematography by: Jeff Mygatt
- Editing by: Debby Germino
- Original air date: November 19, 2013
- Running time: 43 minutes

Guest appearances
- Peter MacNicol as Elliot Randolph; Michael Graziadei as Jakob Nystrom; Erin Way as Petra Larsen

Episode chronology
← Previous "The Hub"	Next → "Repairs"
- Agents of S.H.I.E.L.D. season 1

"The Well" is the eighth episode of the first season of the American television series Agents of S.H.I.E.L.D. Based on the Marvel Comics organization S.H.I.E.L.D., it follows Phil Coulson and his team of S.H.I.E.L.D. agents as they search for an Asgardian weapon while fighting a paganist hate group. It is set in the Marvel Cinematic Universe (MCU) and acknowledges the franchise's films. The episode was written by Monica Owusu-Breen, and directed by Jonathan Frakes.

Clark Gregg reprises his role as Coulson from the film series, and is joined by series regulars Ming-Na Wen, Brett Dalton, Chloe Bennet, Iain De Caestecker, and Elizabeth Henstridge. The episode serves as a direct tie-in to the film Thor: The Dark World, depicting the immediate aftermath of the film, but has its own stand alone storyline revolving around a separate Asgardian character (portrayed by guest star Peter MacNicol). The storyline also begins to reveal the backstories of several main characters, especially Dalton's Grant Ward, whose memories of the titular well are revealed as flashbacks throughout the episode.

"The Well" originally aired on ABC on November 19, 2013, and according to Nielsen Media Research, was watched by 6.89 million viewers.

== Plot ==
In Norway, the leaders of a pagan hate group obsessed with Norse mythology find part of a staff, hidden within an ancient tree, that grants them superhuman strength. Agent Phil Coulson and his team of S.H.I.E.L.D. agents, having recently assisted with the cleanup of London following the Convergence, (Note: As depicted in Thor: The Dark World (2013).) investigate the tree and deduce that it contained an Asgardian staff. Consulting with Elliot Randolph, a professor of Norse mythology, they learn of the Berserker, an Asgardian warrior who remained on Earth after a long ago war, and broke his war staff into three pieces. The professor reveals three poems, each pointing to the location of a piece; one matched the tree in Norway. Randolph sends the team to Baffin Island, but they soon realize that this was misdirection. They follow one of the poems to underground catacombs in Spain, where Randolph forces agent Grant Ward to touch a second piece of the staff, unlocking painful memories of a young boy in a well.

The pagans attack Randolph with their own piece of the staff, taking his. Coulson arrests Randolph, and they discover that he is the Asgardian Berserker. He directs them to Ireland, to a church where he hid the third piece of the staff, but the pagans also find the church. The staff causes great surges of adrenalin within its users, and for Ward this comes from his memories—he had been forced by his older brother to trap their younger brother in a well. Ward manages to defeat the pagans, with the help of agent Melinda May, who can control the staff after learning to live with her own bad memories. Coulson, Jemma Simmons, and Leo Fitz manage to keep Randolph alive long enough for his Asgardian heart to heal itself, and though Coulson wishes to touch the staff himself to try and unlock memories from his death (Note: As depicted in The Avengers (2012).) and resurrection, Randolph convinces him not to. That night, Ward turns down agent Skye's offer to talk about his past, instead going to May's hotel room.

== Production ==
=== Development and writing ===
In October 2013, Marvel revealed that the eighth episode would be titled "The Well", and would be written by Monica Owusu-Breen, with Jonathan Frakes directing. It was originally produced as the seventh episode. Speaking to the repressed darkness Grant Ward experiences, Owusu-Breen said the darkness to a character like Ward is "inherent" continuing, "so there's something interesting about what it means to have that controlled violence and what it would be inside of you. Especially on the hero side. Where that darkness can come from was really interesting to us."

=== Casting ===
Main cast members Clark Gregg, Ming-Na Wen, Brett Dalton, Chloe Bennet, Iain De Caestecker, and Elizabeth Henstridge star as Phil Coulson, Melinda May, Grant Ward, Skye, Leo Fitz, and Jemma Simmons, respectively. It was revealed that the guest cast for the episode would include Peter MacNicol as Professor Elliot Randolph, Michael Graziadei as Jakob Nystrom, Erin Way as Petra Larsen, Toby Wilson as Neils, Alex Neustaedter as Maynard and Sylvia Brindis as Elena. Wilson, Neustaedter, and Brindis did not receive guest star credit in the episode. Neustaedter's character, whose name is not used within the episode, would later be renamed Christian for the second season of the series.

=== Filming ===
Filming occurred from September 24 to October 3, 2013. Location shooting for the episode occurred in Downtown Los Angeles, the Ebell of Los Angeles, and Griffith Park. Various locations were considered for the Irish monastery, but they were not suitable for the required mounting necessary for the various stunts that take place in the location, so a set was constructed. Dalton broke a bone in his hand during the filming of a fight sequence, hitting it against the hard foam prop of the Asgardian staff. As such, the injury had to be incorporated into the next episode. The episode uses footage from the 2006 Dublin riots to portray riots in Norway.

=== Music ===
Because the actual story of the episode stands apart from the episode's tie-in with Thor: The Dark World (2013), composer Bear McCreary "felt no pressure from either the producers" or himself to incorporate material from the scores for the Thor films into the episode. Instead, McCreary composed his own Asgard theme, which introduces "a new tone to Agents of S.H.I.E.L.D., one that embraces Marvel's fantasy roots". McCreary wrote the theme as "an old fanfare, a melody that captured the majesty of Asgardian nobility", but because of the more grounded nature of the series, and the fact that the theme was often needed for quiet dialogue scenes while MacNicol's Randolph recounts Asgardian legends, McCreary often just used the "essence" of the theme in the episode: for MacNicol's scenes, McCreary "thinned [the theme] out to subtle wisps", while English horns, bassoon, and cello quote the theme in "mysterious settings".

The anarchist group that opposes the protagonists in the episode is represented musically by "a snarling distorted synth bass, oscillating in minor thirds", which McCreary designed as a metaphor for "how their minds are altered when they touch the staff and absorb the Asgardian rage". For the series of flashbacks revolving around the titular well, McCreary used "a recurring cluster of pitches that rings disturbingly hollow. The sound is not urgently scary, nor is it sad. It leaves the audience alone to interpret the images on screen." Though he didn't consider it a theme, referring to it as the "Ward Chord", McCreary said that "it does function thematically because it recurs with each flashback, and increases tension each time."

=== Marvel Cinematic Universe tie-ins ===
To tie-in with Thor: The Dark World, the episode opens with a montage of footage from the film briefly featuring Chris Hemsworth as Thor. Director Jonathan Frakes said many on the series were "so excited" about this episode being the first official tie-in with the films, and figuring out how the film assets from The Dark World would fit into the episode. However, as the episode was being edited, the amount of material diminished, resulting in the very brief opening montage.

The episode then deals with the immediate aftermath of the film, showing the series' characters literally cleaning up the mess left behind by the film's characters. Executive producer Jed Whedon explained that S.H.I.E.L.D. cleaning up after superhero events is something that has always happened, but never been depicted in the series before. Actress Bennet noted that it was not actually necessary for audiences to see the film to understand the episode. The rest of the episode's story deals with Asgardians in general. Whedon described this as the episode's story spilling "into more of the ancient aspects into Asgardians and how they visited us long ago, so we get into a little bit of that aspect of Asgard and how it's affected our planet in the past and currently." Coulson mentions that he consulted with Randolph around the events of Thor.

== Release ==
=== Broadcast ===
"The Well" was first aired in the United States on ABC on November 19, 2013. It premiered in the United Kingdom on Channel 4 on November 24, 2013, while it aired on the Seven Network in Australia on November 20, 2013.

=== Home media ===
The episode, along with the rest of Agents of S.H.I.E.L.D.'s first season, was released on Blu-ray and DVD on September 9, 2014. Bonus features include behind-the-scenes featurettes, audio commentary, deleted scenes, and a blooper reel. On November 20, 2014, the episode became available for streaming on Netflix. The episode, along with the rest of the series, was removed from Netflix on February 28, 2022, and later became available on Disney+ on March 16, 2022.

== Reception ==
=== Ratings ===
In the United States the episode received a 2.4/7 percent share among adults between the ages of 18 and 49, meaning that it was seen by 2.4 percent of all households, and 7 percent of all of those watching television at the time of the broadcast. It was watched by 6.89 million viewers. The United Kingdom premiere had 2.1 million viewers and in Australia, the premiere had 1.5 million viewers, including 0.7 million timeshifted viewers.

=== Controversy ===
Following the airing of the episode, Rajan Zed, the president of the Universal Society of Hinduism, called for an apology for its insinuation that the Hindu god Vishnu could be an alien. In a statement concerning the incident, the Society said that "faith was something sacred and attempts at debasing it hurt the adherents. Television and Hollywood should be more conscious while handling faith related subjects, as television and cinema were very mighty mediums and these could create stereotypes in the minds of some audiences." Zed elaborated that "Hinduism ... should not be taken lightly. Symbols of any faith, larger or smaller, should not be mishandled." A fictional version of Vishnu has previously appeared as a character in Marvel Comics.
