= Ragtag (Agents of S.H.I.E.L.D.) =

- Agents of S.H.I.E.L.D. episode
- "The Art of Level Seven" poster for the episode
- Episode no.: Season 1 Episode 21
- Directed by: Roxann Dawson
- Written by: Jeffrey Bell
- Cinematography by: Feliks Parnell
- Editing by: Conrad Smart
- Original air date: May 6, 2014
- Running time: 43 minutes

Guest appearances
- Bill Paxton as John Garrett; J. August Richards as Mike Peterson / Deathlok; B. J. Britt as Antoine Triplett; David Conrad as Ian Quinn; Ruth Negga as Raina; Austin Lyon as young Grant Ward; Glenn Morshower as Jacobs

Episode chronology
← Previous "Nothing Personal"	Next → "Beginning of the End"
- Agents of S.H.I.E.L.D. season 1

"Ragtag" is the twenty-first episode of the first season of the American television series Agents of S.H.I.E.L.D. Based on the Marvel Comics organization S.H.I.E.L.D., it follows Phil Coulson and his team of S.H.I.E.L.D. agents as they search for a secret Hydra base. It is set in the Marvel Cinematic Universe (MCU) and acknowledges the franchise's films. The episode was written by Jeffrey Bell, and directed by Roxann Dawson.

Clark Gregg reprises his role as Coulson from the film series, and is joined by series regulars Ming-Na Wen, Brett Dalton, Chloe Bennet, Iain De Caestecker, and Elizabeth Henstridge.

"Ragtag" originally aired on ABC on May 6, 2014, and according to Nielsen Media Research, was watched by 5.37 million viewers.

== Plot ==
In flashbacks, a teenage Grant Ward is seen in juvenile detention where he first meets John Garrett, and accepts his offer to join his organization, S.H.I.E.L.D. Over the years, Garrett trains Ward, and eventually tells him about Hydra and their presence within S.H.I.E.L.D. As a final test, Garrett has Ward shoot his beloved dog, Buddy. Ward is seemingly unable and fires a shot into the sky to scare Buddy away, but then uses a sniper rifle to kill him.

In the present, Phil Coulson's team realize Cybertek Industries is a front for Hydra, and decide to investigate them to find out what Garrett is planning and stop him, despite not being officially sanctioned to do so (with Leo Fitz describing them as vigilantes). Antoine Triplett provides the team with 1940s Strategic Scientific Reserve (SSR) gadgets, which belonged to his grandfather, a Howling Commando. Coulson and Melinda May infiltrate a Cybertek facility posing as scientists, so they can remotely trigger a Trojan virus on Skye's hard drive, which will hack the Cybertek mainframe and give them access to Hydra's systems. They discover that Cybertek only keeps hard copies, to avoid being hacked, but they find a file on Project Deathlok, and learn that Garrett was the first test subject in 1990: after he was injured on a mission and received no help from S.H.I.E.L.D., he turned against them and joined Hydra, from whom he received cybernetic implants to save his life. The team realize that Garrett wants GH325 for himself, as his organs are failing and he is near death, but he is willing to also use GH325 to perfect the Centipede serum for Hydra's use.

While Garrett relocates Hydra's operations to a new Cybertek facility in the US, Raina reveals extensive information to Ward regarding Skye's origins, including the revelation that Skye's parents were the "monsters" which killed the villagers protecting her. Tracking Cybertek shipments, the team realize that Hydra is using the Cuban S.H.I.E.L.D. base. Coulson, May, Skye and Triplett go to the base to activate the Trojan program, and are attacked by several Centipede soldiers and a Hydra operative wielding the Berserker staff. Meanwhile, Fitz and Jemma Simmons search for the Bus and are captured by Ward, but Fitz uses an electromagnetic pulse device to damage Garrett's implants. Crippled, Garrett orders Ward to execute Fitz and Simmons, who lock themselves inside a medical unit. Fitz appeals to Ward, but he ejects from the plane, into the ocean. Having synthesized GH325 from the assorted T.A.H.I.T.I. drugs, Raina injects the sample into Garrett's Centipede serum intravenous filter, saving him.

In an end tag, Ian Quinn meets with generals in Washington, D.C. to sell the Deathlok concept to the military.

== Production ==
=== Development ===
In April 2014, Marvel revealed that the twenty-first episode would be titled "Ragtag", and would be written by executive producer Jeffrey Bell, with Roxann Dawson directing.

=== Writing ===
On the episode's focus on Grant Ward, Bell said, "Ward is showing all these different colors, and we thought it might be fun to show how Ward became Ward. Nothing definitive, because we're still driving towards our conclusion with Deathlok and Raina and Garrett and Quinn and our cavalcade of bad guys, but Ward really is front and center in this episode...I really do feel Ward is trapped between two families, or the two pulls. Because as we learned, he really does care for Skye. And I do believe he cares for Fitz and Simmons and the whole team, to a certain extent, and that he was following orders. On the other hand, he has this deathly obligation to Garrett". About the title, Bell explained, "The episode is called "ragtag" and they've kind of lost everything. Maria Hill has told us as much, that there's no more S.H.I.E.L.D., and so how do we go on and how does Coulson carry forward, when the organization that he believed in more than anything is disbanded? It seems like S.H.I.E.L.D. or no S.H.I.E.L.D. our team has to try and bring Garrett and Ward to some sort of justice and conclusion, and that's where we're speeding towards."

=== Casting ===
In April 2014, Marvel revealed that main cast members Clark Gregg, Ming-Na Wen, Brett Dalton, Chloe Bennet, Iain De Caestecker, and Elizabeth Henstridge would star as Phil Coulson, Melinda May, Grant Ward, Skye, Leo Fitz, and Jemma Simmons, respectively. It was also revealed that the guest cast for the episode would include Bill Paxton as Agent John Garrett, B. J. Britt as Agent Antoine Triplett; Ruth Negga as Raina; David Conrad as Ian Quinn; J. August Richards as Mike Peterson. Glenn Morshower also guest stars, portraying General Jacobs. Paxton, Britt, Negga, Conrad, and Richards reprise their roles from earlier in the series.

=== Filming ===
Filming occurred from March 19 to 31, 2014.

== Release ==
=== Broadcast ===
"Ragtag" was first aired in the United States on ABC on May 6, 2014.

=== Marketing ===
For the final six episodes, Marvel began the "Marvel's Agents of S.H.I.E.L.D.: The Art of Level Seven" initiative, in which a different image was released each Thursday before a new episode, depicting a first look at a key event from the upcoming episode. Bell stated that the initiative was a way to tie the series back to its comics roots, and was thought of at the beginning of the season. The production team tried to pair specific artists to the teaser posters based on their previous work and how it connected to the themes and emotion of the intended episode. The poster for "Ragtag", created by Emma Ríos, depicts significant moments in Ward's life, as well as Fitz–Simmons in danger, and Skye looming behind the S.H.I.E.L.D. logo, as if she is a presence that Ward cannot seem to shake. Rios wanted the poster to have narrative aspects, trying to "reflect Ward's struggle in the reflection, as if it were a mirror, and have people thinking about what may have been happening inside Ward's brain".

=== Home media ===
The episode, along with the rest of Agents of S.H.I.E.L.D.'s first season, was released on Blu-ray and DVD on September 9, 2014. Bonus features include behind-the-scenes featurettes, audio commentary, deleted scenes, and a blooper reel. On November 20, 2014, the episode became available for streaming on Netflix. The episode, along with the rest of the series, was removed from Netflix on February 28, 2022, and later became available on Disney+ on March 16, 2022.

== Reception ==
=== Ratings ===
In the United States the episode received a 1.9/6 percent share among adults between the ages of 18 and 49, meaning that it was seen by 1.9 percent of all households, and 6 percent of all of those watching television at the time of the broadcast. It was watched by 5.37 million viewers.
