= Repairs (Agents of S.H.I.E.L.D.) =

- Agents of S.H.I.E.L.D. episode
- Episode no.: Season 1 Episode 9
- Directed by: Billy Gierhart
- Written by: Maurissa Tancharoen; Jed Whedon
- Cinematography by: Jeff Mygatt
- Editing by: Joshua Charson
- Original air date: November 26, 2013
- Running time: 44 minutes

Guest appearances
- Robert Baker as Tobias Ford; Laura Seay as Hannah Hutchins

Episode chronology
← Previous "The Well"	Next → "The Bridge"
- Agents of S.H.I.E.L.D. season 1

"Repairs" is the ninth episode of the first season of the American television series Agents of S.H.I.E.L.D. Based on the Marvel Comics organization S.H.I.E.L.D., it follows Phil Coulson and his team of S.H.I.E.L.D. agents as they face an apparent ghost. It is set in the Marvel Cinematic Universe (MCU) and acknowledges the franchise's films. The episode was written by Maurissa Tancharoen and Jed Whedon, and directed by Billy Gierhart.

Clark Gregg reprises his role as Coulson from the film series, and is joined by series regulars Ming-Na Wen, Brett Dalton, Chloe Bennet, Iain De Caestecker, and Elizabeth Henstridge.

"Repairs" originally aired on ABC on November 26, 2013, and according to Nielsen Media Research, was watched by 9.69 million viewers.

== Plot ==
In a town in Utah the morning after S.H.I.E.L.D.'s conflict with a paganist hate group, (Note: As depicted in "The Well".) Hannah Hutchins, supervisor of the local particle accelerator, is tormented by the locals for supposedly causing an explosion which killed four people. She has apparently developed telekinetic powers in self-defense, and an incident where a convenience store owner terrorizes her results in an explosion destroying the store. Agent Phil Coulson's team leaves Dublin and travels to Utah to interrogate Hutchins, only to find an angry mob at her house. A car spontaneously drives at the mob, riling them still further, so agent Melinda May tranquilizes Hutchins.

The team escort Hutchins to the Fridge, in a cell aboard the Bus which will inhibit telekinesis. When Skye expresses concern about May's approach to dealing with Hutchins, Coulson explains that May has experience in dealing with superhumans, relating some details of a mission in Bahrain in 2008, (Note: As shown in the season two episode "Melinda".) in which May single-handedly took out a superhuman threat and several accomplices, saving a team of S.H.I.E.L.D. agents, though a young girl was killed in the crossfire. Left traumatized by the experience, May withdrew from field duty.

A series of strange occurrences around the Bus cause the team to realize that Hutchins is not causing the telekinetic incidents: one of the workers, Tobias Ford, attempted to sabotage the accelerator after making numerous complaints to Hutchins because he wanted her to notice him. The socially incapable Ford thought it was the only way to get her attention, and after being trapped in a partially-corporeal state by the explosion he caused, in limbo between Earth and another dimension (which he describes as "Hell"), he has been using his new abilities to "protect" Hutchins. Ford cuts the plane's power, and it crashes in a field. When Leo Fitz and Jemma Simmons try to make repairs, Ford locks up everyone except May, demanding that Hutchins be released to him. May takes Hutchins and escapes into a nearby forest until Ford corners them in a barn. May fights Ford until Hutchins talks him down, and May convinces him to let go of Hannah, at which point he dissipates. Hutchins is later put into witness protection.

In an end tag May pulls a prank on Fitz, revealing that her trauma is gradually healing.

== Production ==
=== Development and writing ===
In November 2013, Marvel revealed that the ninth episode would be titled "Repairs", and would be written by executive producers Maurissa Tancharoen and Jed Whedon, with Billy Gierhart directing. A bottle episode for the season, Tancharoen said, "Even though the clock is always ticking on our show, we found it a very nice opportunity to just have some quiet moments." Some explanation is given in the episode as to why Melinda May is known as "The Cavalry", with Tancharoen noting the full details were not revealed, instead using the other characters' attempts to explain the origin to explain why "she's a legend" since "people tell your tale, and it's always changing".

=== Casting ===
In November 2013, Marvel revealed that main cast members Clark Gregg, Ming-Na Wen, Brett Dalton, Chloe Bennet, Iain De Caestecker, and Elizabeth Henstridge would star as Phil Coulson, Melinda May, Grant Ward, Skye, Leo Fitz, and Jemma Simmons, respectively. It was also revealed that the guest cast for the episode would include Robert Baker as Tobias Ford, Laura Seay as Hannah Hutchins, Christopher Gehrman as Taylor and Josh Clark as Roger.

=== Filming ===
Filming occurred from October 16 to 24, 2013. The opening gas station scene was filmed in Soledad Canyon near Santa Clarita, California, while the barn set was filmed at Golden Oak Ranch.

=== Marvel Cinematic Universe tie-ins ===
The Roxxon Corporation plays a prominent role in the episode, with a Roxxon gas station appearing, and a Roxxon particle accelerator the cause of the episode's issues. Roxxon previously appeared in the Marvel One-Shot A Funny Thing Happened on the Way to Thor's Hammer.

== Release ==
=== Broadcast ===
"Repairs" was first aired in the United States on ABC on November 26, 2013.

=== Home media ===
The episode, along with the rest of Agents of S.H.I.E.L.D.'s first season, was released on Blu-ray and DVD on September 9, 2014. Bonus features include behind-the-scenes featurettes, audio commentary, deleted scenes, and a blooper reel. On November 20, 2014, the episode became available for streaming on Netflix. The episode, along with the rest of the series, was removed from Netflix on February 28, 2022, and later became available on Disney+ on March 16, 2022.

== Reception ==
=== Ratings ===
In the United States the episode received a 2.6/8 percent share among adults between the ages of 18 and 49, meaning that it was seen by 2.6 percent of all households, and 8 percent of all of those watching television at the time of the broadcast. It was watched by 9.69 million viewers.
