= The Magical Place =

- Agents of S.H.I.E.L.D. episode
- Episode no.: Season 1 Episode 11
- Directed by: Kevin Hooks
- Written by: Paul Zbyszewski; Brent Fletcher
- Cinematography by: Jeff Mygatt
- Editing by: Debby Germino
- Original air date: January 7, 2014
- Running time: 42 minutes

Guest appearances
- Saffron Burrows as Victoria Hand; Rob Huebel as Lloyd Rathman; J. August Richards as Mike Peterson; Ruth Negga as Raina; Cullen Douglas as Edison Po; Ron Glass as Streiten; Aiden Turner as T. Vanchat; Felisha Terrell as Emily Deville

Episode chronology
← Previous "The Bridge"	Next → "Seeds"
- Agents of S.H.I.E.L.D. season 1

"The Magical Place" is the eleventh episode of the first season of the American television series Agents of S.H.I.E.L.D. Based on the Marvel Comics organization S.H.I.E.L.D., it follows Phil Coulson and his team of S.H.I.E.L.D. agents as they attempt to rescue him from Project Centipede. It is set in the Marvel Cinematic Universe (MCU) and acknowledges the franchise's films. The episode was written by Paul Zbyszewski and Brent Fletcher, and directed by Kevin Hooks.

Clark Gregg reprises his role as Coulson from the film series, and is joined by series regulars Ming-Na Wen, Brett Dalton, Chloe Bennet, Iain De Caestecker, and Elizabeth Henstridge.

"The Magical Place" originally aired on ABC on January 7, 2014, and according to Nielsen Media Research, was watched by 6.63 million viewers.

== Plot ==
Over the course of two days following agent Phil Coulson's abduction, a task force led by Victoria Hand searches for him. They start by arresting T. Vanchat when he was selling Chitauri metal to Emily Deville. His Chitauri metal is a match to the type used in the Centipede serum, so S.H.I.E.L.D. believe he can lead them to Edison Po and Raina. Hand is infuriated when Skye hacks S.H.I.E.L.D.'s databases to trace Vanchat's finances, and decides to eject Skye from the Bus after increasing the security on her internet blocker bracelet. Grant Ward, Leo Fitz and Jemma Simmons provide Skye with a satellite phone and help her evade other agents to go off the grid. When she is unable to gain access to a computer system without it being remotely shut down by S.H.I.E.L.D., she poses as an agent to blackmail corrupt businessman Lloyd Rathman into helping her.

Po has taken Coulson to an abandoned town and interrogates him using a mind probe to try to discover the circumstances of his resurrection following the Battle of New York, claiming the Clairvoyant cannot "see" what happened. Po's efforts are futile and the Clairvoyant kills him, putting Raina in charge instead. Raina treats Coulson with kindness, convincing him that she also wants to know how he was revived, and mentioning his father's death during his youth, and his relationship with the cellist, both of which the Clairvoyant knew about; she also reveals that she allowed the probe to be used on her. Coulson eventually lets her use the machine on him, reawakening traumatic buried memories.

Vanchat's information sends Hand's team in the wrong direction, but Skye traces Raina's purchases and learns where she is, before regrouping with Melinda May, Ward, Fitz and Simmons to go to the town. While May and Ward defeat the Centipede soldiers guarding the town, Skye rescues Coulson, and Raina is arrested. Coulson removes Skye's blocker device by way of thanks, and informs the team that their new mission is to track down the Clairvoyant. He later meets with Streiten, one of the S.H.I.E.L.D. doctors who operated on him, and Streiten confirms that Coulson's reawakened memories are real: Coulson was dead for days rather than minutes, and was kept alive by machines which directly stimulated his brain with electricity, until a means of fully healing him could be found. His memories were altered so he believed he had a pleasant recovery in Tahiti.

In an end tag, Mike Peterson, still alive but severely burned and minus his right leg, awakens in a basement and realizes that he has received an eye implant, through which the Clairvoyant begins to issue instructions to him.

== Production ==
=== Development and writing ===
In December 2014, Marvel revealed that the eleventh episode would be titled "The Magical Place", and would be written by Paul Zbyszewski and Brent Fletcher, with Kevin Hooks directing. Fletcher was excited to pair Phil Coulson with Raina in the episode, since she had become a "different [type of] villain" for the series. The episode's ending, in which Coulson visualizes his brain being reconstructed, was one of the early conceptualizations for the series from showrunners Jed Whedon, Maurissa Tancharoen, and Jeffrey Bell.

=== Casting ===
In December 2014, Marvel revealed that main cast members Clark Gregg, Ming-Na Wen, Brett Dalton, Chloe Bennet, Iain De Caestecker, and Elizabeth Henstridge would star as Phil Coulson, Melinda May, Grant Ward, Skye, Leo Fitz, and Jemma Simmons, respectively. It was also revealed that the guest cast for the episode would include Saffron Burrows as Agent Victoria Hand, Ron Glass as Dr. Streiten, Ruth Negga as Raina, Rob Huebel as Lloyd Rathman, Aiden Turner as T. Vanchat, Felisha Terrell as Emily Deville, Cullen Douglas as Edison Po. Burrows, Glass, Negga, and Douglas reprise their roles from earlier in the series. J. August Richards also appears, reprising his role of Mike Peterson. Though Turner is introduced here as T. Vanchat, the character had been mentioned previously in the season, including in "Pilot" and "Eye Spy".

=== Filming and visual effect ===
Filming occurred from November 7 to 18, 2013. A scenic ghost town was made to look like a 1950s nuclear testing ground for the location where Coulson is held, while a small grass hut was constructed surrounded by green screen to represent Coulson's memory of Tahiti. When Coulson is being operated on, Gregg wore a green screen cap to allow the visual effects of his exposed brain to be added. Visual effects supervisor Mark Kolpack also digitally extended the operating room set and added the robot arm performing the surgery. Kolpack's vision for the robot arm was a mix between Edward Scissorhands (1990) and a black widow spider with "needles moving at a high rate of speed". Small bolts of electricity were also added each time the arm touched Coulson's brain to represent neurological activity.

=== Marvel Cinematic Universe tie-ins ===
Douglas's Edison Po is killed in the episode with the paralysis technology used by Obadiah Stane in Iron Man (2008).

== Release ==
=== Broadcast ===
"The Magical Place" was first aired in the United States on ABC on January 7, 2014.

=== Home media ===
The episode, along with the rest of Agents of S.H.I.E.L.D.'s first season, was released on Blu-ray and DVD on September 9, 2014. Bonus features include behind-the-scenes featurettes, audio commentary, deleted scenes, and a blooper reel. On November 20, 2014, the episode became available for streaming on Netflix. The episode, along with the rest of the series, was removed from Netflix on February 28, 2022, and later became available on Disney+ on March 16, 2022.

== Reception ==
=== Ratings ===
In the United States the episode received a 2.2/6 percent share among adults between the ages of 18 and 49, meaning that it was seen by 2.2 percent of all households, and 6 percent of all of those watching television at the time of the broadcast. It was watched by 6.63 million viewers.
