= The Bridge (Agents of S.H.I.E.L.D.) =

- Agents of S.H.I.E.L.D. episode
- Episode no.: Season 1 Episode 10
- Directed by: Holly Dale
- Written by: Shalisha Francis
- Cinematography by: Feliks Parnell
- Editing by: Paul Trejo
- Original air date: December 10, 2013
- Running time: 41 minutes

Guest appearances
- J. August Richards as Mike Peterson; Ruth Negga as Raina; Cullen Douglas as Edison Po; Molly McCook as Laura Hayward

Episode chronology
← Previous "Repairs"	Next → "The Magical Place"
- Agents of S.H.I.E.L.D. season 1

"The Bridge" is the tenth episode of the first season of the American television series Agents of S.H.I.E.L.D. Based on the Marvel Comics organization S.H.I.E.L.D., it follows Phil Coulson and his team of S.H.I.E.L.D. agents as they recruit the super-powered Mike Peterson to face the mysterious Project Centipede organization. It is set in the Marvel Cinematic Universe (MCU) and acknowledges the franchise's films. The episode was written by Shalisha Francis and directed by Holly Dale.

Clark Gregg reprises his role as Coulson from the film series, and is joined by series regulars Ming-Na Wen, Brett Dalton, Chloe Bennet, Iain De Caestecker, and Elizabeth Henstridge.

"The Bridge" originally aired on ABC on December 10, 2013, and according to Nielsen Media Research, was watched by 6.11 million viewers.

== Plot ==
Three soldiers using the improved Centipede serum rescue Edison Po from prison. Phil Coulson requests for Mike Peterson, who is now part of S.H.I.E.L.D.'s own super soldier program, to help his team pursue Po and his super soldiers. Skye discovers that Po was visited in prison by Raina, and their lip-reading software allows them to hear a sentence spoken by Po about "the Clairvoyant".

One of the super soldiers is identified as Brian Hayward; Coulson and Grant Ward go in search of his sister, university student Laura, telling her that her brother has won the lottery. When she calls Brian, the team trace the call to a warehouse in Oakland, California. Coulson, Melinda May, Ward and Mike storm the building to find Po and Raina have already fled but left the super soldiers behind, and they overpower Ward and May before Mike subdues Hayward. The soldiers are revealed to have X-ray eye detonators, advanced versions of the device implanted in Akela Amador, and Po kills Hayward remotely before ordering the others to flee.

Raina abducts Ace Peterson, and the team assume Po and Raina want to trade him for his father. The trade takes place at a bridge under construction, but as Coulson escorts Mike to meet Raina and Ace, Mike reveals that the conspirators actually want Coulson, who gives himself up in exchange for Ace. After taking Ace to safety Mike attempts to rescue Coulson, only to be caught in an explosion and presumably killed as Po and Raina depart in a helicopter with Coulson.

In an end tag, Raina informs Coulson that they wish to know what happened after he was killed by Loki during the Battle of New York.

== Production ==
=== Development ===
In November 2013, Marvel revealed that the tenth episode would be titled "The Bridge", and would be written by Shalisha Francis, with Holly Dale directing.

=== Casting ===
In November 2013, Marvel revealed that main cast members Clark Gregg, Ming-Na Wen, Brett Dalton, Chloe Bennet, Iain De Caestecker, and Elizabeth Henstridge would star as Phil Coulson, Melinda May, Grant Ward, Skye, Leo Fitz, and Jemma Simmons, respectively. It was also revealed that the guest cast for the episode would include J. August Richards as Mike Peterson, Ajani Wrighster as Ace Peterson, Ruth Negga as Raina, Paul Lacovara as Brian Hayward, Molly McCook as Laura Hayward, Cullen Douglas as Edison Po, Rico Devereaux as prison guard and Albert Marrero Jr. as trainer. Wrighster, Malambri, Devereaux, and Marrero did not receive guest star credit in the episode. Richards, Negga, and Douglas reprise their roles from earlier in the series.

=== Filming ===
Filming occurred from October 28 to November 7, 2013. Filming locations included Long Beach and San Pedro in the Los Angeles area. The final bridge sequence was filmed on November 6 at the Queensway Twin Bridges, with all of the elements involved in the sequence "mapped out... down to the second". The explosions were done twice, in order to capture both a wide shot and close-ups.

== Release ==
=== Broadcast ===
"The Bridge" was first aired in the United States on ABC on December 10, 2013.

=== Home media ===
The episode, along with the rest of Agents of S.H.I.E.L.D.'s first season, was released on Blu-ray and DVD on September 9, 2014. Bonus features include behind-the-scenes featurettes, audio commentary, deleted scenes, and a blooper reel. On November 20, 2014, the episode became available for streaming on Netflix. The episode, along with the rest of the series, was removed from Netflix on February 28, 2022, and later became available on Disney+ on March 16, 2022.

== Reception ==
=== Ratings ===
In the United States the episode received a 2.1/6 percent share among adults between the ages of 18 and 49, meaning that it was seen by 2.1 percent of all households, and 6 percent of all of those watching television at the time of the broadcast. It was watched by 6.11 million viewers.
