= End of the Beginning (Agents of S.H.I.E.L.D.) =

- Agents of S.H.I.E.L.D. episode
- Episode no.: Season 1 Episode 16
- Directed by: Bobby Roth
- Written by: Paul Zbyszewski
- Cinematography by: Feliks Parnell
- Editing by: David Crabtree
- Original air date: April 1, 2014
- Running time: 41 minutes

Guest appearances
- Bill Paxton as John Garrett; Saffron Burrows as Victoria Hand; J. August Richards as Mike Peterson / Deathlok; B. J. Britt as Antoine Triplett; Titus Welliver as Felix Blake; Maximiliano Hernández as Jasper Sitwell; Brad Dourif as Thomas Nash

Episode chronology
← Previous "Yes Men"	Next → "Turn, Turn, Turn"
- Agents of S.H.I.E.L.D. season 1

"End of the Beginning" is the sixteenth episode of the first season of the American television series Agents of S.H.I.E.L.D. Based on the Marvel Comics organization S.H.I.E.L.D., it follows Phil Coulson and his team of S.H.I.E.L.D. agents as they hunt for the mysterious Clairvoyant. It is set in the Marvel Cinematic Universe (MCU) and acknowledges the franchise's films. The episode was written by Paul Zbyszewski, and directed by Bobby Roth.

Clark Gregg reprises his role as Coulson from the film series, and is joined by series regulars Ming-Na Wen, Brett Dalton, Chloe Bennet, Iain De Caestecker, and Elizabeth Henstridge. The episode brings together several major guest stars from throughout the season, including J. August Richards, Titus Welliver, Saffron Burrows, Maximiliano Hernández, and Bill Paxton, with Hernández's appearance leading into the beginning of Captain America: The Winter Soldier, a film that the rest of the episode mentions and partly runs concurrently with.

"End of the Beginning" originally aired on ABC on April 1, 2014, and according to Nielsen Media Research, was watched by 5.71 million viewers.

== Plot ==
In a safe house, S.H.I.E.L.D. agents John Garrett and Antoine Triplett are attacked by Mike Peterson, who had become the cyborg "Deathlok" and is working for their nemesis, the Clairvoyant. Weeks later, Phil Coulson recruits agents Garrett, Triplett, Victoria Hand, Felix Blake and Jasper Sitwell to join his team to hunt down the Clairvoyant and Deathlok. Garrett and Coulson believe that the Clairvoyant is a psychic, and that Deathlok's recent attack signifies that they are getting close to unraveling the true identity of the Clairvoyant. The two have narrowed their list to those who were rejected by S.H.I.E.L.D. as gifted people. Garrett believes that they should compartmentalize the information to withhold this from the Clairvoyant. Coulson assigns Skye to choose which candidates to pursue and to pair the agents into teams; he promotes her into a full-fledged S.H.I.E.L.D. agent to help her gain access to the information.

Before they could begin, Sitwell leaves the team after he is ordered by the Triskelion to report to the S.H.I.E.L.D. vessel Lemurian Star, (Note: As seen in Captain America: The Winter Soldier.) and Hand decides to assist them via satellite from the Hub. Garrett tells Skye that the team has changed the perspective of Agent Grant Ward, who now has a cause to fight for. Agent Melinda May offers to help fellow agents Leo Fitz and Jemma Simmons in their research of the drug that helped heal the injuries of Coulson and Skye. Triplett, who is partnered with Ward, is revealed to harbor a grudge against the Clairvoyant for killing his partner. Coulson, Garrett, May and Blake are assigned to other locations, however Blake is ambushed by Deathlok. Deathlok declares that "Mike Peterson is dead" before critically injuring Blake, who manages to plant a tracker on him. The team concludes that the target May and Blake were following, Thomas Nash, is their prime suspect.

Through the tracker planted by Blake, the agents pursue Deathlok in an abandoned horse racing track, while Triplett and Simmons stay behind at the Hub with Hand. After a brief battle with Deathlok, Coulson and Garrett discover Nash, who is in a vegetative state, but seems to communicate through a speech-generating device. Nash, boasting that he is the Clairvoyant, claims he can see everything, and threatens to kill Skye, causing an enraged Ward to shoot him dead. Before they depart to interrogate Ward, May informs Coulson that Director Nick Fury needs Coulson at the Triskelion.

Meanwhile, on the Bus, Fitz discovers May's secret phone line while attempting to create another line to contact Simmons. When Skye presents the results of her analysis of the S.H.I.E.L.D. psychological files to Coulson, the two realize that the Clairvoyant was not Nash, but a member of S.H.I.E.L.D. with similar access to the files allowing them to manipulate the agents by apparently having privileged information. While Coulson accuses a defensive Ward of shooting Nash to misdirect them on the Clairvoyant's true identity, Fitz informs Skye of the secret phone line. Coulson is informed of May's secret line and, alongside Skye, confronts her. As May tries to explain that she could not disclose who is on the other end of the line, the plane is remotely hijacked. At the Hub, Hand is revealed to be the one that commissioned the hijack and orders her subordinates to kill the agents except for Coulson, saying, "He's mine".

== Production ==
=== Development ===
In March 2014, Marvel revealed that the sixteenth episode would be titled "End of the Beginning", and would be written by Paul Zbyszewski, with Bobby Roth directing. The character Thomas Nash was named for the Elizabethan writer Thomas Nashe, who wrote a story that was believed to establish the phrase "red herring"; Nash in the episode is a red herring for the S.H.I.E.L.D. team, given he is not the real Clairvoyant.

=== Casting ===
In March 2014, Marvel revealed that main cast members Clark Gregg, Ming-Na Wen, Brett Dalton, Chloe Bennet, Iain De Caestecker, and Elizabeth Henstridge would star as Phil Coulson, Melinda May, Grant Ward, Skye, Leo Fitz, and Jemma Simmons, respectively. It was also revealed that the guest cast for the episode would include Bill Paxton as Agent John Garrett, J. August Richards as Mike Peterson / Deathlok, Saffron Burrows as Agent Victoria Hand, Maximiliano Hernández as Agent Jasper Sitwell, Titus Welliver as Agent Felix Blake, B. J. Britt as Agent Antoine Triplett and Brad Dourif as Thomas Nash. Paxton, Richards, Burrows, Hernández, Welliver, and Britt reprise their roles from earlier in the series. Zbyszewski felt Dourif had the perfect presence to portray Nash.

=== Filming ===
Filming occurred from January 20 to 30, 2014. The end of the episode was shot at Hollywood Park Racetrack. The script originally called for an abandoned shopping mall, but this was changed to the racetrack when the series' crew learned that it would be available during filming. The racetrack was officially abandoned following an auction on January 24 and 25, allowing the series' crew to prepare the racetrack for filming on January 27 and 28, 2014.

=== Marvel Cinematic Universe tie-ins ===
Hernández reprises his role from the films, and is mentioned on exiting the episode early to be going to the Lemurian Star, a boat on which the character appears at the beginning of Captain America: The Winter Soldier. The film is heavily implied to be taking place simultaneously with the episode, and the episode ends with a scene from the film as a teaser for it, ahead of its release later on in the week of "End of the Beginning"'s airing.

== Release ==
=== Broadcast ===
"End of the Beginning" was first aired in the United States on ABC on April 1, 2014. Marvel and the series' creatives had multiple discussions with ABC to ensure this episode would air the week before Winter Soldier released, which was not previously guaranteed, in order for the episode to be the front bookend to the film.

=== Marketing ===
Beginning with the episode "T.A.H.I.T.I.", all episodes leading up to the release of Captain America: The Winter Soldier and the series' crossover with that film were marketed as Agents of S.H.I.E.L.D.: Uprising.

=== Home media ===
The episode, along with the rest of Agents of S.H.I.E.L.D.'s first season, was released on Blu-ray and DVD on September 9, 2014. Bonus features include behind-the-scenes featurettes, audio commentary, deleted scenes, and a blooper reel. On November 20, 2014, the episode became available for streaming on Netflix. The episode, along with the rest of the series, was removed from Netflix on February 28, 2022, and later became available on Disney+ on March 16, 2022.

== Reception ==
=== Ratings ===
In the United States the episode received a 2.0/6 percent share among adults between the ages of 18 and 49, meaning that it was seen by 2.0 percent of all households, and 6 percent of all of those watching television at the time of the broadcast. It was watched by 5.71 million viewers.

=== Accolades ===
In June 2016, IGN ranked the episode as the ninth best in the series.
