= Yes Men (Agents of S.H.I.E.L.D.) =

- Agents of S.H.I.E.L.D. episode
- Episode no.: Season 1 Episode 15
- Directed by: John Terlesky
- Written by: Shalisha Francis
- Cinematography by: Feliks Parnell
- Editing by: Joshua Charson
- Original air date: March 11, 2014
- Running time: 42 minutes

Guest appearances
- Jaimie Alexander as Sif; Elena Satine as Lorelei; Maximiliano Hernández as Jasper Sitwell; Rob Belushi as Jimmy; Dylan Bruno as Rooster; Alicia Lagano as Rosie

Episode chronology
← Previous "T.A.H.I.T.I."	Next → "End of the Beginning"
- Agents of S.H.I.E.L.D. season 1

"Yes Men" is the fifteenth episode of the first season of the American television series Agents of S.H.I.E.L.D. Based on the Marvel Comics organization S.H.I.E.L.D., it follows Phil Coulson and his team of S.H.I.E.L.D. agents as they get caught in an Asgardian fight. It is set in the Marvel Cinematic Universe (MCU) and acknowledges the franchise's films. The episode was written by Shalisha Francis and directed by John Terlesky.

Clark Gregg reprises his role as Coulson from the film series, and is joined by series regulars Ming-Na Wen, Brett Dalton, Chloe Bennet, Iain De Caestecker, and Elizabeth Henstridge. Jaimie Alexander and Maximiliano Hernández appear as Sif and Jasper Sitwell, respectively, also reprising their roles from the films. The former does so in a tie-in with Thor: The Dark World, the latter in set up for Captain America: The Winter Soldier.

"Yes Men" originally aired on ABC on March 11, 2014, and according to Nielsen Media Research, was watched by 5.99 million viewers.

== Plot ==
The Asgardian Lorelei enslaves a biker gang and begins to form an army. S.H.I.E.L.D. detects the opening of the Bifrost in California and Phil Coulson's team travel there, reuniting with Sif, who has been dispatched by Odin (Note: Loki in disguise as seen in Thor: The Dark World.) to recapture Lorelei. She enlists their help, explaining that Lorelei escaped imprisonment during Malekith's attack on Asgard, detailing Lorelei's abilities and showing them a device designed to prevent her to speak. Six hundred years earlier Lorelei almost seized the kingdom with an army of Asgardian men.

The team trace Lorelei to the biker gang's bar, and a fight ensues between Sif and Lorelei, while the team fights Lorelei's men. The device to inhibit Lorelei's voice is damaged, and she enchants Grant Ward and escapes to Las Vegas with him. Leo Fitz attempts to repair the voice inhibitor while Skye tracks Ward and Lorelei, and the team head to Las Vegas to find them. However, Lorelei and Ward instead hijack the Bus, and Lorelei enchants Fitz, who had succeeded in repairing the voice inhibitor; using it as bait, Fitz is able to trap Sif in the cell. Melinda May confronts Lorelei, who reveals that Ward is in love with Skye, and orders Ward to kill May. Sif is able to trick Lorelei into entering the cell and defeats her in a fight; Lorelei's power fails as soon as the device is attached to her neck, freeing Ward and Fitz.

Sif takes Lorelei back to Asgard, while May ends her relationship with Ward. Coulson informs Skye of the GH325's alien origins; they decide to keep it secret from the others until they have answers from Nick Fury, and pursue the Clairvoyant in the meantime. May eavesdrops using a listening device, and then makes a call on a secret secure line, telling an unidentified person that "Coulson knows".

== Production ==
=== Development and writing ===
In March 2014, Marvel revealed that the fifteenth episode would be titled "Yes Men", and would be written by Shalisha Francis, with John Terlesky directing. Francis called "Yes Men" "a very important episode" because Phil Coulson has learned the source of the GH serum is alien in the previous episode, while also now dealing with the Asgardians on Earth. The title of the episode alludes to all the men Lorelei seduces, along with referring to Coulson, who has always been a "yes man" for S.H.I.E.L.D. Francis added by the end of the episode, Coulson "realizes that he's going to stop looking for Fury and he's going to go get his answers".

=== Casting ===
In February 2014, Jaimie Alexander was revealed to be reprising her role of Sif from Thor (2011) and Thor: The Dark World (2013) in the episode, with executive producer Jed Whedon saying, "We always have our radar up for ways to tie our series into the Marvel films and bringing in an Asgardian really cements that connection."

In March 2014, Marvel revealed that main cast members Clark Gregg, Ming-Na Wen, Brett Dalton, Chloe Bennet, Iain De Caestecker, and Elizabeth Henstridge would star as Phil Coulson, Melinda May, Grant Ward, Skye, Leo Fitz, and Jemma Simmons, respectively. It was also revealed that in addition to Alexander, the guest cast for the episode would include Elena Satine as Lorelei; Maximiliano Hernández as agent Jasper Sitwell; Dylan Bruno as Rooster; Alicia Lagano as Rosie; Allan Graf as Sheriff; Rob Belushi as Jimmy. Graff did not receive guest star credit in the episode. Satine, Hernández, and Belushi reprise their roles from earlier in the series.

=== Design ===
In creating Lorelei's costume, costume designer Ann Foley wanted to retain the character's signature color of blue from the comics, while adding in gold because "Asgardians love their gold"; this was done through a shoulder piece. Foley referenced what had been done in Thor and Thor: The Dark World "to stay true to what has already been established in the Marvel Cinematic Universe". Phillip Boutte Jr. created illustrated mockups of various design options for Lorelei, while Marvel COO Joe Quesada designed various collar devices. Marvel provided Foley with Sif's costume from Thor: The Dark World, to retain continuity with her appearance from that film.

=== Filming ===
Filming occurred from January 8 to 20, 2014. Shooting occurred near the Mojave Desert in Palmdale, California at the film set Four Acres for two days. Three shooting units were utilized, including an aerial unit shooting the high speed car chases from a helicopter. As well, a small unit went to Las Vegas to film exteriors of the Las Vegas Strip.

=== Marvel Cinematic Universe tie-ins ===
With the appearance of Asgardians Sif and Lorelei, the former mentions that the latter escaped prison during the Dark Elf attack, as depicted in Thor: The Dark World. Hernández reprises his role from the films, and talks to Coulson about the whereabouts of S.H.I.E.L.D. director Nick Fury, who appears in Captain America: The Winter Soldier alongside Hernández's Sitwell. The episode also introduces the motorcycle gang Dogs of Hell, whose New York chapter is later seen in the second season of Daredevil.

== Release ==
=== Broadcast ===
"Yes Men" was first aired in the United States on ABC on March 11, 2014.

=== Marketing ===
Beginning with the previous episode, "T.A.H.I.T.I.", all episodes leading up to the release of Captain America: The Winter Soldier and the series' crossover with that film were marketed as Agents of S.H.I.E.L.D.: Uprising.

=== Home media ===
The episode, along with the rest of Agents of S.H.I.E.L.D.'s first season, was released on Blu-ray and DVD on September 9, 2014. Bonus features include behind-the-scenes featurettes, audio commentary, deleted scenes, and a blooper reel. On November 20, 2014, the episode became available for streaming on Netflix. The episode, along with the rest of the series, was removed from Netflix on February 28, 2022, and later became available on Disney+ on March 16, 2022.

== Reception ==
=== Ratings ===
In the United States the episode received a 2.1/7 percent share among adults between the ages of 18 and 49, meaning that it was seen by 2.1 percent of all households, and 7 percent of all of those watching television at the time of the broadcast. It was watched by 5.99 million viewers.
