= Patrick Brennan (actor) =

American actor

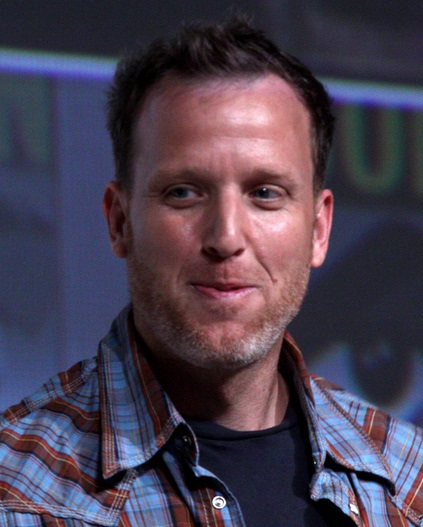
- Patrick Brennan in 2012.
- Born: Patrick Oliver Lampson; December 25, 1972 (age 53); Los Angeles, California, U.S.
- Education: Azusa Pacific University
- Occupation: Actor
- Years active: 2001–present
- Children: 2
- Mother: Eileen Brennan

Patrick Oliver Lampson, known professionally as Patrick Brennan, (born December 25, 1972) is an American actor.

== Biography ==
Patrick Brennan is the son of photographer and poet David John Lampson and famed actress Eileen Brennan. He also has a brother, Samuel, who is a professional singer. Patrick started his career as a basketball player while still at Santa Monica College and soon after transferred to Azusa Pacific University. While there, he shifted his focus from sports to theater mostly inspired by his own mother. He acted on stage before appearing on television and film. Some of his most notable roles include Liam in The Twilight Saga: Breaking Dawn – Part 2 and Marcus Daniels on Agents of S.H.I.E.L.D..

== Personal life ==
Brennan has two children; a son born in 2009 and a daughter born in 2013.

== Filmography ==
Film roles
| Year | Title | Role | Notes |
|---|---|---|---|
| 2001 | Palco & Hirsch | John Tom's Employee | |
| 2006 | Time Capsule | Adam's Father | Short |
| 2006 | 10th & Wolf | Night Manager at Pharmacy | |
| 2007 | Take | Incensed Man | |
| 2008 | Adventures in Appletown | Officer Johnson | Direct-to-Video |
| 2010 | The Next Three Days | Hospital Guard | |
| 2012 | The Twilight Saga: Breaking Dawn – Part 2 | Liam | |
| 2014 | Aldo | Boss | |
| 2017 | Espionage Tonight | Tall Fellow | |
| 2018 | Corbin Nash | Wade | |
| 2018 | Bent | Casey | |
| 2019 | Captain Marvel | Bartender | |
| 2022 | Blonde | Joe | |

Television roles
| Year | Title | Role | Notes |
|---|---|---|---|
| 2004 | Half & Half | Oscar | Episode: "The Big Birth-Date Episode" |
| 2005 | CSI: NY | Brian Brocko | Episode: "Tri-Borough" |
| 2007 | The Black Donnellys | Earl | Recurring |
| 2008 | Crash | Timmy | Episode: "Pissing in the Sandbox" |
| 2013 | Sons of Anarchy | Officer Prant | Episode: "The Mad King" |
| 2014 | Agents of S.H.I.E.L.D. | Marcus Daniels | 2 episodes |
| 2015 | 100 Code | The Dentist | 3 episodes |
| 2015 | The Last Ship | Cult Leader / Kevin McDowell | 5 episodes |
| 2015 | The Player | The Norseman / Gunnar Torvald | Episode: "The Norseman" |
| 2016 | NCIS: New Orleans | Zed Hastings | 3 episodes |
| 2019 | Sneaky Pete | Chet | Episode: "The Vermont Victim & The Bakersfield Hustle" |
| 2020 | Perry Mason | Officer Cobb | Episode: "Chapter 2" |
| 2021 | Blue Bloods | Dave Hobbs | Episode: "Fallen Heroes" |
| 2023 | Bosch: Legacy | David Foster | |
| 2025 | The Hunting Party (TV series) | Clayton Jessup | Episode 2: Clayton Jessup |
