= Brent Fletcher =

American television writer

- Occupation: Writer
- Years active: 1993–present

Brent Fletcher is an American television writer. He has worked on television series such as Lost and Angel.

== Career ==
He was a freelance writer for the first season of Lost. Fletcher and the writing staff won the Writers Guild of America (WGA) Award for Best Dramatic Series at the February 2006 ceremony for their work on the first season of Lost.

He has worked on the NBC drama series Friday Night Lights as a writer. He was nominated for a WGA Award for Best Dramatic Series at the February 2009 ceremony for his work on the third season of Friday Night Lights. He was nominated for the WGA Award for Best Drama Series for the second consecutive year at the February 2010 ceremony for his work on the fourth season.

Fletcher was a writer and story editor on Starz' Spartacus: Blood and Sand and Agents of S.H.I.E.L.D.. He also served as a writer for the superhero drama television series Superman & Lois.
