= Missing Pieces (Agents of S.H.I.E.L.D.) =

- Agents of S.H.I.E.L.D. episode
- Episode no.: Season 6 Episode 1
- Directed by: Clark Gregg
- Written by: Jed Whedon; Maurissa Tancharoen
- Cinematography by: Allan Westbrook
- Editing by: Eric Litman
- Original air date: May 10, 2019

Guest appearances
- Maximilian Osinski as Davis; Briana Venskus as Piper; Joel Stoffer as Enoch; Barry Shabaka Henley as Marcus Benson; Lucas Bryant as Keller; Winston James Francis as Jaco; Matt O'Leary as Pax; Brooke Williams as Snowflake; Glenn Keogh as Trok; Levi Meaden as Fox

Episode chronology
← Previous "The End"	Next → "Window of Opportunity"
- Agents of S.H.I.E.L.D. season 6

"Missing Pieces" is the first episode of the sixth season of the American television series Agents of S.H.I.E.L.D. Based on the Marvel Comics organization S.H.I.E.L.D., it follows S.H.I.E.L.D. agents and allies as they try to save humanity following the death of director Phil Coulson. It is set in the Marvel Cinematic Universe (MCU) and acknowledges the franchise's films. The episode was written by showrunners Jed Whedon and Maurissa Tancharoen and directed by series star Clark Gregg.

Gregg reprises his role as Coulson from the film series, and also takes on the new character Sarge. He stars alongside Ming-Na Wen, Chloe Bennet, Iain De Caestecker, Elizabeth Henstridge, Henry Simmons, Natalia Cordova-Buckley, and Jeff Ward.

"Missing Pieces" originally aired on ABC on May 10, 2019, and was watched by 3.63 million viewers within a week of its release.

== Plot ==
A year after the death of former director Phil Coulson, Alphonso "Mack" Mackenzie is rebuilding S.H.I.E.L.D. While investigating anomalies, they come across a man who is partially concrete. Meanwhile, in deep space, Agents Daisy Johnson, Jemma Simmons, Piper, and Davis search for Leo Fitz after the death of the Fitz from the Destroyed Earth timeline. The present Fitz was last seen in a cryo-freeze chamber on a spaceship with the Chronicom Enoch. When the agents find the spaceship, they find it abandoned and the chamber empty. Simmons learns that the chamber was created on Naro-Atzia, but the others decide to return to Earth. They argue about where to jump to until they come across a Confederacy cruiser. In the rush to escape, Simmons plots a course to Naro-Atzia.

On Earth, Mack and Melinda May recruit Dr. Marcus Benson to help found a S.H.I.E.L.D. Academy in Coulson's name and provide science support. They find coordinates on the man in concrete, Tinker, which lead them to a museum. The surviving hostiles from the anomalies are there and destroy the museum to make way for their leader, Sarge, who is revealed to be a lookalike of Coulson.

== Production ==
=== Development ===
The crew of Agents of S.H.I.E.L.D. believed the series was likely to be cancelled following its fifth season, so they made the fifth-season finale as if it was the series finale. However, ABC renewed the series for a sixth season in May 2018. With the start of filming in July 2018, the sixth-season premiere was revealed to be titled "Missing Pieces", written by showrunners Jed Whedon and Maurissa Tancharoen. The episode features an onscreen tribute to S.H.I.E.L.D. co-creator Stan Lee, who died in November 2018.

=== Writing ===
Because the writers had gone beyond all of their initial plans for the series, they had to create new storylines for the sixth season that did not repeat elements from previous seasons. The episode begins one year after the end of the fifth season, and finds the cast split into two groups: a team in space searching for Leo Fitz following the events of season five; and the rest of S.H.I.E.L.D. on Earth, investigating a series of energy anomalies while rebuilding S.H.I.E.L.D. and carrying on Coulson's legacy.

=== Casting ===
After the airing of the fifth season's finale, which implied the death of Coulson, actor Clark Gregg said there was "some interest" in having him be involved in the sixth season, and that he would be meeting with the showrunners to discuss this. He speculated that this could be for flashbacks, and was unsure if he would remain a series regular.

At 2018 San Diego Comic-Con, main cast members Ming-Na Wen, Chloe Bennet, Iain De Caestecker, Elizabeth Henstridge, Henry Simmons, and Natalia Cordova-Buckley were confirmed to return from previous seasons as Melinda May, Daisy Johnson / Quake, Leo Fitz, Jemma Simmons, Alphonso "Mack" Mackenzie, and Elena "Yo-Yo" Rodriguez, respectively. Additionally, Jeff Ward was promoted to series regular for the season, after recurring in the fifth as Deke Shaw. Gregg was set to return to the series as director for the sixth-season premiere, but not confirmed to be returning as an actor. In December, Coulson was confirmed to have died between the events of the fifth and sixth seasons. The next month, Gregg was revealed to be portraying a new character in the season, named Sarge. Gregg was confirmed to still be a series regular in March 2019.

Briana Venskus and Maximilian Osinski having recurring roles in the sixth season as S.H.I.E.L.D. agents Piper and Davis, after appearing in minor roles in previous seasons. Joel Stoffer also returns from the previous season as Enoch. In April 2018, Barry Shabaka Henley was announced as cast as natural science professor Marcus Benson. Osinski, Venskus, Stoffer, and Henley guest star in the episode alongside Lucas Bryant as Keller, Winston James Francis as Jaco, Matt O'Leary as Pax, Brooke Williams as Snowflake, Glenn Keogh as Trok, and Levi Meaden as Fox.

=== Filming and visual effects ===
Filming for the episode began on July 16, 2018, in Culver City, California, with Gregg directing. After the emotional fifth-season finale, Wen felt that returning for the sixth season with Gregg directing was "wonderful out of the gate, and like we got a new life". The opening of the episode was created by visual effects vendor FuseFX. For the space scenes, some of the movements made by Zephyr-One were inspired by the Millennium Falcon. The effect of Sarge's crew appearing through the handball court wall was created by CoSA VFX, and inspired by different videos of objects being pushed through barriers. For the destruction of the building at the end of the episode, visual effects supervisor Mark Kolpack took many photographs of the building so a digital model of it could be created by Rhythm and Hues. The production then filmed the same street that the building is on but in the opposite direction so the model could be added to the empty space and then destroyed without revealing the original building behind it.

== Release ==
"Missing Pieces" was first screened at WonderCon on March 30. It aired in the United States on ABC on May 10, 2019. The episode began streaming on Netflix in the United States on September 1, 2019, along with the rest of the sixth season.

== Reception ==
=== Ratings ===
In the United States the episode received a 0.4/3 percent share among adults between the ages of 18 and 49, meaning that it was seen by 0.4 percent of all households, and 3 percent of all of those watching television at the time of the broadcast. This was a drop from the previous season's finale and average viewership. However, the total audience of 2.31 million people was the largest for the series since January 2018. Within a week of its release, "Missing Pieces" had been watched by 3.63 million U.S. viewers.
