= Agents of S.H.I.E.L.D. season 6 =

Agents of S.H.I.E.L.D.
- Season 6
- Promotional poster
- Showrunners: Jed Whedon; Maurissa Tancharoen; Jeffrey Bell
- Starring: Clark Gregg; Ming-Na Wen; Chloe Bennet; Iain De Caestecker; Elizabeth Henstridge; Henry Simmons; Natalia Cordova-Buckley; Jeff Ward
- No. of episodes: 13

Release
- Original network: ABC
- Original release: May 10 – August 2, 2019

Season chronology
- ← Previous; Season 5 Next → Season 7

The sixth season of the American television series Agents of S.H.I.E.L.D., based on the Marvel Comics organization S.H.I.E.L.D., follows S.H.I.E.L.D. agents and allies as they try to save humanity following the death of director Phil Coulson. It is set in the Marvel Cinematic Universe (MCU) and acknowledges the continuity of the franchise's films. The season is produced by ABC Studios, Marvel Television, and Mutant Enemy Productions, with Jed Whedon, Maurissa Tancharoen, and Jeffrey Bell serving as showrunners.

Clark Gregg, who portrays Coulson in the series and films, returns as the new character Sarge in the season, alongside series regulars Ming-Na Wen, Chloe Bennet, Iain De Caestecker, Elizabeth Henstridge, Henry Simmons, and Natalia Cordova-Buckley. They are joined by Jeff Ward, promoted from a recurring role in the fifth season. The sixth season was ordered in May 2018, and filming took place from that July until December. Unlike previous seasons, which featured direct tie-ins with MCU films, this season avoids directly referencing the films Avengers: Infinity War (2018) and Avengers: Endgame (2019) due to logistical issues, and so it can tell its own story.

The sixth season premiered on ABC on May 10, 2019, and ran for 13 episodes until August 2. The season debuted to lower ratings and had a lower average viewership than the previous season, but it was the highest ranking program in its timeslot for the 2019 summer period and the best performing series for ABC in the timeslot since 2016. It received positive reviews, with praise for its lighter tone and pacing, which critics credited to its shorter run of episodes in comparison to previous seasons. Critics also praised the performances and writing. In November 2018, before the season debuted, ABC renewed the series for a seventh and final season.

== Episodes ==
No. overall	No. in season	Title	Directed by	Written by	Original release date	U.S. viewers (millions)
111	1	"Missing Pieces"	Clark Gregg	Jed Whedon & Maurissa Tancharoen	May 10, 2019	2.31
A year after the death of director Phil Coulson, S.H.I.E.L.D. is rebuilding under the leadership of Alphonso "Mack" Mackenzie. They investigate a series of energy anomalies formed by hostile strangers emerging from portals, one of whom gets trapped inside a wall and partially turns to concrete. In deep space, Agents Daisy Johnson, Jemma Simmons, Piper, and Davis search for Leo Fitz, who was last seen in a cryofreeze chamber on a spaceship with the Chronicom Enoch; they find the spaceship abandoned and the chamber empty. Simmons learns that the chamber was created on Naro-Atzia, but the others decide to return to Earth. They are attacked by a Confederacy cruiser and, in the rush to escape, Simmons plots a course to Naro-Atzia. Mack and Melinda May recruit Dr. Marcus Benson to help found a S.H.I.E.L.D. academy and provide science support. They find coordinates on the man in concrete, Tinker, which lead them to a museum. The surviving hostiles are there and destroy the building to make way for their leader, Sarge, who looks just like Coulson.
112	2	"Window of Opportunity"	Kevin Tancharoen	James C. Oliver & Sharla Oliver	May 17, 2019	2.18
Sarge and his crew begin to gather supplies for their mission, hiding their truck using cloaking technology. They rob a jewelry store to gather piezoelectric gems, attracting the attention of S.H.I.E.L.D. May and Elena "Yo-Yo" Rodriguez lead a team to capture Sarge and his crew, but are locked out of the vault. On a hunch, May finds the hidden truck where Sarge's crew is using a portal to move the gems out of the vault. May overpowers Jaco, Snowflake, and Pax, but hesitates when she sees Sarge. Sarge's team pushes May through the portal before closing it. Investigating Tinker, Benson decrypts a memory chip on him and finds footage of Sarge and his crew witnessing the destruction of a planet. In space, Fitz is out of cryo and on a cargo ship with Enoch, who helped him pass as being from the same planet as the crew. Their lie is discovered by the ship's controller, Viro, who threatens to kill them unless they work as slaves. Fitz tricks Viro into being sucked out of an airlock and changes course to Kitson, where the ship's crew can find new work.
113	3	"Fear and Loathing on the Planet of Kitson"	Jesse Bochco	Brent Fletcher & Craig Titley	May 24, 2019	2.26
Fitz and Enoch arrive on Kitson, but their ship gets stolen at gunpoint, so they decide to head to the local casino to win enough money for a new ship in spite of their strict rule against "robots". Meanwhile, Daisy's group arrives on Naro-Atzia, where they are boarded by Malachi, a bounty hunter looking for Fitz. They manage to tie him up and find out that Fitz headed to Kitson, where they arrive later. Meanwhile, Enoch wins multiple consecutive games, but gets played and loses all their winnings. Needing to win a large sum and lacking money to bet, Fitz enters a game where he himself is the collateral: losers are sold into slavery. Daisy, Simmons, and Davis eat some alien "puffs", only to learn that they are hallucinogenic. Malachi, revealed to be another Chronicom, knocks out Davis and overrides Enoch's systems remotely, revealing Enoch as a "robot" to the casino runners. Despite being high, Daisy is able to defeat Malachi's gang. Simmons momentarily reunites with Fitz before Malachi teleports away with him. Meanwhile, back on Earth, Sarge shoots statically-charged particles into the atmosphere, covering the entire planet.
114	4	"Code Yellow"	Mark Kolpack	Nora Zuckerman & Lilla Zuckerman	May 31, 2019	2.35
Deke Shaw is revealed to have started a company using S.H.I.E.L.D.'s tech. Sarge and his team track down a seemingly normal man and kill him with a strange knife. The body is brought to Benson, who discovers a bat-like alien parasite that revives and flies into the vent system after the knife is removed. Sarge's team goes after Shaw as their next target, with Sarge pretending to be Coulson to get close to Shaw. Eventually, Deke realizes it is not Coulson and attempts to escape, aided by an undercover S.H.I.E.L.D. agent assigned to keep an eye on him. Mack, May, and a strike team enter the building and attempt to apprehend Sarge and his group alive. Though Mack is able to capture Pax and Jaco while May defeats Snowflake, Sarge gets the upper hand and kidnaps May. While tracking the parasite, it flies into Agent Keller's mouth and starts fusing with his vascular system. Benson and Yo-Yo attempt to get him to a containment room, but he explodes in a mass of crystalline structures. Yo-Yo retrieves the knife and stops the parasite from destroying the base, but is left devastated by her failure to save Keller.
115	5	"The Other Thing"	Lou Diamond Phillips	George Kitson	June 14, 2019	2.18
While in Sarge's custody, May is forced to kill a parasite-infected man. Afterwards, he reveals that it was part of the "Shrike" parasites that infect worlds and destroy them on behalf of their creator, and that he intends to stop them once and for all. May eventually turns the tables on Sarge and brings him back to base, all while experiencing memories of Coulson. Daisy's team is captured by Chronicoms led by Atarah, Enoch's former superior. After their home world was destroyed by a mysterious plague, they took the Confederacy's ships to defend themselves and kidnapped Fitz to unlock the secret to time travel. With Enoch betraying them and no other choice, Simmons surrenders to the Chronicoms in order to reunite with Fitz and so Daisy and her team can return to Earth. Mack and Benson comfort Yo-Yo, who is still affected by Keller's death. While performing the autopsy, Benson learns that the parasite and the knife used to kill it are composed of crystals similar to the Monoliths the S.H.I.E.L.D. agents have encountered in the past. Enoch reunites with Fitz and gets him up to speed on what has happened before gassing him, betraying him as well.
116	6	"Inescapable"	Jesse Bochco	DJ Doyle	June 21, 2019	2.12
Atarah uses a special device to trap Fitz and Simmons inside their own minds, forcing them to work together to figure out time travel logic. While imprisoned, Fitz learns from a reluctant Simmons of her time-traveling adventures, including the deaths of his alternate future self and Coulson. The two of them are then pursued by Fitz's Framework persona as well as an undead Simmons, formed from her suppressed pain and bad memories from throughout her life. After a brief argument, Fitz and Simmons reconcile and leave the containment module to face their fears, only to find them making out. They are then freed by Enoch, who has had second thoughts about his allegiances and managed to overpower Atarah and the other Chronicoms. The three of them teleport away to an unknown destination. Back on Earth, Daisy briefs Mack on Fitz and Simmons' situation and learns that Earth is being invaded by the same creatures that are responsible for the Chronicom home world's destruction.
117	7	"Toldja"	Keith Potter	Mark Leitner	June 28, 2019	2.17
Fitz, Simmons, and Enoch end up teleporting back to Kitson, where they are captured by Mr. Kitson, the planet's owner, and forced to gamble for their lives. However, a mysterious mercenary named Izel intervenes and buys their freedom in exchange for their help in finding an artifact on Earth. As they prepare a ship for departure, Enoch parts ways with them, as he has now completed his initial mission, and sets out to help his people once more. Back on Earth, S.H.I.E.L.D. attempts to interrogate Sarge and his crew, but to no avail. Using one of his tracker devices, the team locates two Shrike hosts and captures them. However, both hosts cause a violent interaction when in close proximity, creating another crystallized explosion. Sarge reveals their weakness against cold exposure, which helps save May and Yo-Yo in time, in exchange for his and his crew's freedom.
118	8	"Collision Course"	Kristin Windell	Jeffrey Bell & Craig Titley	July 5, 2019	1.79
119	9	"Collision Course"	Sarah Boyd	Iden Baghdadchi	July 12, 2019	2.30
Part 1: Sarge reveals that a large number of Shrike hosts will converge at a specific site to create a crystallized tower in preparation for the arrival of "the Beast". Mack assigns Daisy, May, and Deke to accompany Sarge and Snowflake to the site while he secretly follows them on the Zephyr One. While being imprisoned onboard, Pax tells Yo-Yo that Sarge's plan is to use a bomb to detonate the tower and take out the Beast, who Sarge reveals to be Izel. As they head back toward Earth, Fitz and Simmons learn from Izel that she is looking for the monoliths, otherwise known as the Di'Allas. Izel secretly begins using Shrike to infect the ship's crew one by one until only Fitz and Simmons are left. As Daisy, May, and Deke find the bomb, Sarge teleports back to the Zephyr after setting the truck to collide with the tower. Back on Kitson, Enoch establishes contact with one of his associates, Isaiah, and proposes an alliance. Meanwhile, the Chronicom hunters attempt to take down Enoch by using their memory machine to learn from Fitz and Simmons' memories. Part 2: Sarge takes over the Zephyr and orders Mack to pursue Izel's ship. Deke fails to disarm the bomb but, as the truck hits the tower, Daisy uses her powers to contain it, preventing it from exploding. The collision releases a swarm of Shrike that surround the truck, but Daisy is able to quake them apart. Izel commands the spaceship to retreat. Sarge kills Pax in anger after learning the bomb plot failed. When Fitz and Simmons successfully make contact with S.H.I.E.L.D., Sarge threatens Izel. Believing Fitz and Simmons to be conspiring against her, she commands the ship's crew to eliminate them. Yo-Yo convinces Jaco to remember his purpose for fighting, leading him to help them. Mack frees himself with Yo-Yo's help and overpowers Sarge. Mack, Yo-Yo, Davis, and Jaco then infiltrate Izel's ship and rescue Fitz and Simmons, but Izel disappears. The group escapes the ship through the portal into the truck, reuniting with Daisy and the others. Jaco decides to go back and detonate the bomb, sacrificing himself in the process. Later, S.H.I.E.L.D. celebrates their victory while Sarge is imprisoned. Mack and Yo-Yo reconcile and rekindle their relationship. Later, May enters Sarge's cell and seemingly kills him.
120	10	"Leap"	Garry A. Brown	Drew Z. Greenberg	July 19, 2019	2.38
Sarge's body is taken to the lab, where Fitz and Simmons learn that he is still alive and that his wounds are healing fast. May submits to capture and confesses. However, she later claims that she does not remember. Eventually, the team figures out that Izel has the power to possess people and that she infiltrated the Lighthouse through Davis. Mack puts the base on lockdown and gathers everyone at the command center for questioning. After Mack locks up Daisy and Yo-Yo to prevent them from being controlled, Izel appears and demands the Monoliths. The agents attempt to stop her, but Izel keeps hopping through them until she drops Davis from a ledge, killing him before taking Mack. Fitz deduces that the Monoliths represented space, time, and creation. When they exploded, (Note: As depicted in "All the Comforts of Home".) their combined energy created a new Coulson and sent him to another planet in the past. Sarge escapes and confronts Izel, who has found the device containing the Monoliths' energy. She reveals that his real name is Pachakutiq, they are both from a planet of non-corporeal beings, and he had gotten his memories confused with Coulson's when he took the Coulson body. Despite this, Sarge refuses to join Izel. When Yo-Yo and Daisy confront her, the former allows herself to be possessed and demands Mack fly her somewhere else. Shaken, Sarge still does not believe Izel, even as his powers start to manifest.
121	11	"From the Ashes"	Jennifer Phang	James C. Oliver & Sharla Oliver	July 26, 2019	2.14
Izel plans to take the Monolith energy to a specific temple, so she possesses Mack and summons Benson. Though Yo-Yo successfully warns him before he reveals the information, Izel torments Benson with a manifestation of his deceased husband, Thomas, until he gives up the location. Yo-Yo and Mack trick Izel into releasing Benson so he can let S.H.I.E.L.D. know where she is headed. Daisy and May argue over whether any trace of Coulson lies inside Sarge and if they should further antagonize him to unleash his power against Izel. Deke realizes Izel's ability is based on vibrations, so he, Fitz, and Simmons begin working on a device to counter it. Daisy finally reads the letter Coulson left for her and snaps Sarge's neck. Sarge comes back stronger and begins destroying the Lighthouse, trying to escape. As Daisy prepares to kill him, he calls her "Skye". Daisy realizes Coulson really is in there, so she calms him down and sees him as an ally. Imprisoned in the temple, Izel demands Mack and Yo-Yo recreate the Monoliths' solid forms. They refuse, but are shocked when Flint suddenly appears. Meanwhile, the Chronicoms have learned new information. While Atarah still wishes to save Chronyca-2, Malachi wishes to establish a Chronyca-3, so he kills Atarah and sends other Chronicoms after two targets.
122	12	"The Sign"	Nina Lopez-Corrado	Nora Zuckerman & Lilla Zuckerman	August 2, 2019	1.88
Izel possesses Flint to rebuild the Monoliths, creating a portal to where her people await a sign to invade Earth before breaking Flint's leg and sending out a Shrike army for more hosts. Deke brings his tech company staff to the Lighthouse to mass-produce the devices needed to counter Izel and turn Sarge's daggers into Shrike-killing bullets. May, Sarge, Piper, and Daisy take a Quinjet to the temple. Daisy leads the Shrike-infected zombies away while May and Sarge go to confront Izel. Fed up that nobody respects him, Deke uses his stolen jump-drive to go to the temple himself and free Mack, Yo-Yo, and Flint. Despite not having enough power for a return trip, he manages to set up a camera to show Fitz and Simmons what Izel is doing and make it to the Quinjet on foot. Mack and Yo-Yo have Piper fly Flint to safety, but zombies trap them and Daisy in the Zephyr. Sarge and May face Izel, but Sarge cannot kill her. Confused about the pain he is in, May tells Sarge it is love for the team, but he stabs her and sends her through the portal as the sign, embracing Pachakutiq. Meanwhile, Enoch meets with his contact on Kitson, who tells him all the Chronicoms are now hunters and attacks him.
123	13	"New Life"	Kevin Tancharoen	Brent Fletcher & Jed Whedon	August 2, 2019	1.88
Fitz and Simmons tell the field team what happened to May, but communications are shut off and the Lighthouse is put on lockdown. Malachi and the Chronicoms attack, using Fitz and Simmons' knowledge to anticipate their every move. Barricaded in a room with Framework tech, Fitz and Simmons prepare to sacrifice themselves to destroy it so the Chronicoms cannot use it, but a disguised Enoch saves them and proposes a plan. With the Zephyr disabled, Mack has Deke fly the Quinjet to them, but Yo-Yo is infected by a Shrike. In between realms, where life and death do not matter, May destroys three hooded figures before they can let Izel's kind through. Izel herself appears and overpowers her to establish the connection. Daisy, Mack, and Yo-Yo battle Pachakutiq, but are no match for him. Izel reappears, but May stabs her from behind, killing her and freeing Yo-Yo. Mack kills Pachakutiq, closing the portal. As May slowly dies, Simmons appears with a team and an upgraded Zephyr, putting May in a stasis pod. Everyone evacuates before the Chronicoms destroy the temple and Monoliths. Fitz remotely sends them to safety with an upgraded jump-drive, landing them several decades in the past above Manhattan. Simmons explains that, because the Chronicoms know everything about S.H.I.E.L.D., they will need their own expert to help them fight back, revealing a Chronicom tech-enhanced Coulson Life Model Decoy (LMD).

== Cast and characters ==
=== Main ===
- Clark Gregg as Sarge and Phil Coulson
- Ming-Na Wen as Melinda May
- Chloe Bennet as Daisy Johnson / Quake
- Iain De Caestecker as Leo Fitz
- Elizabeth Henstridge as Jemma Simmons
- Henry Simmons as Alphonso "Mack" Mackenzie
- Natalia Cordova-Buckley as Elena "Yo-Yo" Rodriguez
- Jeff Ward as Deke Shaw

=== Recurring ===
- Maximilian Osinski as Davis
- Briana Venskus as Piper
- Joel Stoffer as Enoch
- Barry Shabaka Henley as Marcus Benson
- Winston James Francis as Jaco
- Matt O'Leary as Pax
- Brooke Williams as Snowflake
- Christopher James Baker as Malachi
- Shainu Bala as Trevor Khan
- Karolina Wydra as Izel

=== Notable guests ===
- Maurissa Tancharoen as Sequoia
- Coy Stewart as Flint

== Production ==
=== Development ===
In January 2018, ABC Entertainment president Channing Dungey was optimistic about Agents of S.H.I.E.L.D. receiving a renewal for a sixth season, but in March, Nellie Andreeva of Deadline Hollywood described the series as being "on the bubble", meaning it "could go either way". Despite receiving low live ratings in its fifth season, the series was considered a "strong DVR gainer and an even stronger international seller" as well as Marvel Television's only chance to have a series on ABC in the 2018–19 television season given that fellow series Inhumans (2017) was considered "dead", and ultimately canceled. The series' crew believed that it was likely to be cancelled, and they made the fifth-season finale as if it was the last episode of the series. On May 14, 2018, Agents of S.H.I.E.L.D. was renewed for a sixth season, consisting of 13 episodes. Some commentators, as well as the series' crew, assumed that this shorter season (previous seasons consisted of 22 episodes) would be the series' last, but Dungey denied this, and a seventh season was ordered in November 2018. The sixth-season premiere features an onscreen tribute to S.H.I.E.L.D. co-creator Stan Lee, who died in November 2018.

=== Writing ===
Because showrunners Jed Whedon, Maurissa Tancharoen, and Jeffrey Bell knew that a seventh season had been ordered while they were working on the sixth, they and the series' writers had the confidence to plan a story that is split over both seasons, with a cliffhanger ending for the sixth season that will be resolved in the seventh. The writers tried to create more episodes in the season that were "outside of [their] normal form of storytelling", like the third season episode "4,722 Hours", and noted that at this point they had gone beyond all of their initial plans for the series and had to work to create new storylines that did not repeat elements from previous seasons. For previous seasons, the writers divided their stories into different "pods" rather than stretching a single story over 22 episodes, but this was not necessary for the shorter 13-episode season.

The season begins one year after the end of the fifth season, in part because the writers wanted to give the characters time to mourn the death of Phil Coulson before starting their next adventure. This season finds the cast split into two groups: a team in space searching for Leo Fitz following the events of season five, and the rest of S.H.I.E.L.D. on Earth. The space sequences expand on elements that were introduced in the fifth season, including the alien Confederacy which Whedon described as a "nod to the tone" of the space elements in the Marvel Cinematic Universe (MCU) but also an attempt to find a new area of that world to explore for the series. Whedon added, "I think that fans are going to be excited to see the nooks and crannies of space that we explore." On Earth, the characters investigate a series of energy anomalies while rebuilding S.H.I.E.L.D. and carrying on Coulson's legacy, with Alphonso "Mack" Mackenzie taking over as director of the organization. They eventually come into contact with Sarge, a new threat to the world who looks like Coulson. Star Chloe Bennet revealed ahead of the season's premiere that there would be an element of fantasy that previous seasons did not have.

The season's storyline revolves around several monoliths, magical stones that were introduced in previous seasons. The writers had not intended this when they first introduced the objects, but when approaching the sixth season they wanted a way to have Sarge be created from Coulson and used the monoliths established control over space, time, and manifesting fear to do so. The writers felt that having Sarge join the heroes at the end of the season would result in a "watered-down" version of Coulson, and they did not want to repeat themselves by carrying the villain over to the next season, so they chose to kill the character off at the end of the season. The season also introduces the Chronicoms as a threat to Earth for the seventh season, with the majority of their story told in short "tag" scenes at the end of each episode leading up to the final episode's cliffhanger.

=== Casting ===
After the airing of the fifth season's finale, which implied the death of Coulson, actor Clark Gregg said there was "some interest" in having him be involved in the sixth season, and that he would be meeting with the showrunners to discuss this. He speculated that this involvement could be for flashbacks, and was unsure if he would remain a series regular as he had been for the previous five seasons. At San Diego Comic-Con 2018, main cast members Ming-Na Wen, Chloe Bennet, Iain De Caestecker, Elizabeth Henstridge, Henry Simmons, and Natalia Cordova-Buckley were confirmed to return from previous seasons as Melinda May, Daisy Johnson / Quake, Leo Fitz, Jemma Simmons, Alphonso "Mack" Mackenzie, and Elena "Yo-Yo" Rodriguez, respectively. Additionally, Jeff Ward was promoted to series regular for the season, after recurring in the fifth as Deke Shaw. That December, Coulson was confirmed to have died between the events of the fifth and sixth seasons. In the season's first teaser released the next month, Gregg was revealed to be portraying a new character in the season, named Sarge. Gregg was confirmed in March 2019 to be retaining his series regular status for the season.

Also returning from previous seasons are Briana Venskus as Piper and Maximilian Osinski as Davis, two minor S.H.I.E.L.D. agents that fans responded positively to in previous seasons. Tancharoen stated that they would be explored more in this season, with the executive producers all agreeing that they had grown to love the characters just as the fans had. This expanded role promoted Venskus and Osinski to recurring status, after having "off-and-on" roles in previous seasons. Additional returners include Joel Stoffer as Enoch and Coy Stewart as Flint. In April 2018, Karolina Wydra, Christopher James Baker, and Barry Shabaka Henley were announced as cast in the roles of mercenary Izel, assassin Malachi, and natural science professor Marcus Benson. Whedon hoped the new characters would bring some "new flavors" to the series. In May, with the season's premiere, several recurring actors were revealed to be portraying members of Sarge's team: Brooke Williams as Snowflake, Winston James Francis as Jaco, and Matt O'Leary as Pax. Shainu Bala also recurs in the season as agent Trevor Khan, while Maurissa Tancharoen has a role as Deke's girlfriend Sequoia.

=== Design ===
Costume designer Whitney Galitz updated Bennet's Quake costume and hairstyle for the season. The updated costume pays homage to the character's appearance in the animated film Marvel Rising: Secret Warriors (2018), where Bennet also voices the character, and retains her gauntlets and utility belt from previous seasons albeit "streamlined and slimmed down". The Quake symbol on the costume's back is also retained, and updated with "contrasting leather panels to make it pop". As part of the inspiration from Marvel Rising, the updated suit has "an additional punch of color to it ... [with] some purple embellishments near the neckline running down the front sides" along with below the waist, while Bennet has longer, blonde hair with purple highlights. Britt Lawrence of CinemaBlend felt Bennet's hair "works fantastically opposite Quake's new costume" with the hair "an extension of Quake's outfit... Instead of being a standalone look, her hair is contributing to it." Lawrence pointed out that the animated version had more purple accents in the costume and a darker, shorter hairstyle where the purple highlights "[frame] her face", compared to the use of purple in Bennet's hair which was more like "softer highlights".

=== Filming ===
Filming for the season began on July 16, 2018, in Culver City, California, with Gregg directing the first episode of the season. After the emotional fifth-season finale, Wen felt that returning for the sixth season with Gregg directing was "wonderful out of the gate, and like we got a new life". She added that the shorter season length was a relief due to the series being "mentally, emotionally, and physically" taxing to film, allowing the cast to work at "150, 200 percent" for the whole season instead of "feeling like, by the 16th episode, we are just trying to swim up river". Filming wrapped by December 18, 2018.

=== Music ===
Composer Bear McCreary created a "rollickin' blues theme" for Sarge in the season, and composed the musical theme Izel sung "during her creepy transformations".

=== Marvel Cinematic Universe tie-ins ===
When asked how the season would connect to the then-upcoming MCU film Avengers: Endgame (2019), Marvel Television head Jeph Loeb suggested in March 2019 that the one year time jump between the previous season of the series and this one was part of the series' tie-in to that film. Endgame is a direct sequel to Avengers: Infinity War (2018), which saw the death of half of all life in the universe beginning shortly after the events of Agents of S.H.I.E.L.D. season five. Endgame features a five-year time-jump before reversing these deaths, setting the sixth season of S.H.I.E.L.D. during a time that half of all life is still dead. After Endgame was released in April, the showrunners and Loeb revealed that the series would not be depicting this loss of life for several reasons: they began production on the season without knowing all of Endgame's plot or how Spider-Man: Far From Home (2019) would be depicting a post-Endgame MCU; they were unsure when the season would be released in relation to Endgame and how much they would be allowed to reveal if they had begun airing before the film was released; and they wanted to focus on telling their own story rather than be "shackled too much to the universe-changing events from the films". They acknowledged that this meant the series no longer lined-up with the films' timeline, but Whedon said the writers had an explanation for this that made sense to them even though they did not plan to "burden the audience" with it. Tim Baysinger of TheWrap suggested that the time travel plot of the fifth season could explain the discrepancy by moving the sixth season into an alternate future not seen by Doctor Strange during Infinity War, one in which the deaths never happened. The season has some thematic similarities with Endgame, as both depict their heroes dealing with loss, which Whedon said was "not a coincidence" and described as "the nature of these stories".

== Marketing ==
A teaser for the season was released in January 2019, revealing Gregg's role. In March, Marvel released a promotional image for the season recreating Leonardo da Vinci's painting The Last Supper with the season's main cast members. Marketing producer Geoffrey Colo clarified that it was not an image from any of the season's episodes, but a "thematic representation" of the season filled with Easter eggs for upcoming episodes on which Colo said, "Some you'll recognize, others won't hold any significance until you've seen the particular episode." The image led to speculation from commentators as to which of the Twelve Apostles from the original painting were being represented by each of the series' characters, and whether any character would represent the betrayer Judas Iscariot. The premiere episode was first screened at WonderCon on March 30. On July 18, 2019, the series had a panel at San Diego Comic-Con with the main cast and executive producers. A sneak peek for the end of the season was also shown.

== Release ==
=== Broadcast ===
The sixth season began airing on ABC in the United States on May 10, 2019, and consisted of 13 episodes. On holding the season until mid-2019, Dungey explained, "By putting it on the summer we feel we can super-serve the show's audience and possibly have it on the air longer", in part because ABC's "live-same-day ratings are less important" in the summer season. Since the season was set to air after the release of Avengers: Endgame, Dungey noted in May 2018 that the decision to schedule it then was ABC's, and not in accordance with any of Marvel Studios' larger MCU plans. However, at one point between then and the season's release, ABC asked Marvel Television about moving the season's premiere several months earlier, and the studio asked them not to do this so that Endgame would not be released in the middle of the season's airing.

=== Home media ===
The season began streaming on Netflix in the United States on September 1, 2019, and was available until February 28, 2022. It became available on Disney+ in the United States on March 16, 2022, joining other territories where it was already available on the service.

== Reception ==
=== Ratings ===
Viewership and ratings per episode of Agents of S.H.I.E.L.D. season 6
No.	Title	Air date	Rating/share (18–49)	Viewers (millions)	DVR (18–49)	DVR viewers (millions)	Total (18–49)	Total viewers (millions)
1	"Missing Pieces"	May 10, 2019	0.4/3	2.31	0.5	1.32	0.9	3.63
2	"Window of Opportunity"	May 17, 2019	0.4/3	2.18	0.4	1.24	0.8	3.42
3	"Fear and Loathing on the Planet of Kitson"	May 24, 2019	0.4/3	2.26	0.4	1.09	0.8	3.40
4	"Code Yellow"	May 31, 2019	0.5/3	2.35	0.4	1.10	0.9	3.45
5	"The Other Thing"	June 14, 2019	0.4/3	2.18	0.4	1.03	0.8	3.21
6	"Inescapable"	June 21, 2019	0.4/3	2.12	0.3	1.01	0.7	3.13
7	"Toldja"	June 28, 2019	0.4/3	2.17	0.4	1.02	0.8	3.19
8	"Collision Course (Part I)"	July 5, 2019	0.3/2	1.79	0.4	1.03	0.7	2.82
9	"Collision Course (Part II)"	July 12, 2019	0.4/3	2.30	0.4	1.04	0.8	3.34
10	"Leap"	July 19, 2019	0.5/3	2.38	0.3	1.07	0.8	3.45
11	"From the Ashes"	July 26, 2019	0.4/3	2.14	0.3	0.99	0.7	3.13
12	"The Sign"	August 2, 2019	0.4/3	1.88	0.4	1.09	0.8	2.97
13	"New Life"	August 2, 2019	0.4/3	1.88	0.4	1.09	0.8	2.97

According to Nielsen Media Research, the season premiered to a 0.4/3 percent share among adults between the ages of 18 and 49, meaning that it was seen by 0.4 percent of all households, and 3 percent of all of those watching television at the time of the broadcast. This was a drop from the previous seasons's finale and average viewership. However, the total audience of 2.31 million people was the largest for the series since January 2018. The season went on to be the highest ranking program in its timeslot for the 2019 summer period, and best performing series for ABC in the timeslot since the 2016 summer period. The season averaged 2.25 million total viewers, including from DVR, ranking 158th among network series in the 2018–19 television season. It also had an average total 18–49 rating of 0.4, which was 165th.

=== Critical response ===
The review aggregator website Rotten Tomatoes reports a 93% approval rating, with an average score of 7.7/10, based on 15 reviews. The website's consensus reads, "Six seasons in and Agents of S.H.I.E.L.D. continues to deepen its exploration of space and the relationships between its heroes."

=== Accolades ===
Year	Award	Category	Nominee(s)	Result	Ref.
2019	California On Location Awards	Assistant Location Manager – Television	Miles Beal-Ampah	Won	
2019	Teen Choice Awards	Choice Summer TV Actress	Chloe Bennet	Nominated	
