= The Real Deal (Agents of S.H.I.E.L.D.) =

- Agents of S.H.I.E.L.D. episode
- Episode no.: Season 5 Episode 12
- Directed by: Kevin Tancharoen
- Written by: Jed Whedon; Maurissa Tancharoen; Jeffrey Bell
- Cinematography by: Feliks Parnell
- Editing by: Kelly Stuyvesant
- Original air date: March 9, 2018
- Running time: 43 minutes

Guest appearances
- Jeff Ward as Deke Shaw; J. August Richards as Mike Peterson / Deathlok; Catherine Dent as Hale; Maximilian Osinski as Davis; Shontae Saldana as Candace Lee; Stewart Skelton as Chief Wellins

Episode chronology
← Previous "All the Comforts of Home"	Next → "Principia"
- Agents of S.H.I.E.L.D. season 5

"The Real Deal" is the 12th episode of the fifth season, and the 100th episode overall, of the American television series Agents of S.H.I.E.L.D. Based on the Marvel Comics organization S.H.I.E.L.D., it follows Phil Coulson and his team of S.H.I.E.L.D. agents as he reveals the details of his bargain with the Ghost Rider, while they deal with a space-time rift that manifests their worst fears. It is set in the Marvel Cinematic Universe (MCU) and acknowledges the franchise's films. The episode was written by Jed Whedon, Maurissa Tancharoen, and Jeffrey Bell, and directed by Kevin Tancharoen.

Clark Gregg reprises his role as Coulson from the film series, starring alongside Ming-Na Wen, Chloe Bennet, Iain De Caestecker, Elizabeth Henstridge, Henry Simmons, and Natalia Cordova-Buckley. The episode features prominent references to previous seasons, including past characters and events, with J. August Richards reprising his role as Deathlok from earlier seasons in a guest appearance. Notably, the episode includes the wedding of Leo Fitz (De Caestecker) and Jemma Simmons (Henstridge), which the writers included as a moment that would satisfy long time fans of the series. The wedding was filmed on location in Placerita Canyon State Park.

"The Real Deal" originally aired on ABC on March 9, 2018, and was watched by 3.78 million viewers within a week. This came after a marketing campaign for the episode that included roundtable discussions, hosted by Patton Oswalt, with the cast and crew discussing the making of the first 100 episodes, as well as the art program titled Marvel's Agents of S.H.I.E.L.D.: The Road to 100, which saw the release of five posters, each commemorating the key events of the series' first five seasons. The episode received positive reviews, with critics praising its emotional weight, Richards' return, and the cast's performances, especially those of Gregg and Bennet. Critics also highlighted the Fitz and Simmons wedding as a satisfactory moment for viewers.

== Plot ==
After the three monoliths in the Lighthouse were destroyed in an explosion, (Note: As depicted in "All the Comforts of Home".) S.H.I.E.L.D. discovers that it provoked a space-time rift that leads to a dimension that causes the worst fears of everyone that enters there to be manifested as illusions, and that it might spread uncontrollably if the rift isn't closed. Leo Fitz then reveals that he might be able to create a machine that may close the rift, but someone must sacrifice themselves in order to activate, as it only works if it is close to the rift. In spite of the danger of either being stuck in another dimension or being killed, Phil Coulson offers himself to activate it. While Fitz, Daisy Johnson, and Melinda May try to convince him otherwise, Coulson suddenly faints.

After Jemma Simmons analyses Coulson, she reveals that he is dying due to an unknown disease, which May realizes is due to Coulson's deal with the Ghost Rider, (Note: As depicted in "World's End".) which devastates the team, including Johnson. Coulson then comforts Johnson, whom he wants to direct S.H.I.E.L.D. after his death. Upon stopping an illusion of a Life Model Decoy (LMD) replica of Simmons from killing Elena "Yo-Yo" Rodriguez, Fitz realizes how quickly the rift is expanding, forcing him to work quickly on the machine. Coulson goes to the lower levels with the machine, where the rift is located. Upon reaching the rift, he is confronted by an illusion of Mike Peterson, who claims that everything Coulson experienced since the creation of the team was simply a hallucination, and that he is still being healed after being killed by Loki. (Note: As depicted in The Avengers.) Coulson is unswayed, however, to which the illusion tries to forcibly take him to the rift, before being destroyed by the real Deathlok, who has been contacted by Deke Shaw, along with many other S.H.I.E.L.D. agents. Peterson then helps Coulson close the rift, though Fitz warns that it may not be able to permanently close it.

In the aftermath, Coulson marries Fitz and Simmons, with the team looking on happily. During the wedding, Shaw reveals to Deathlok that he got Simmons' ring, which he says is similar to his grandmother's. Meanwhile, General Hale, who has been tracking down Shaw and Johnson, runs a test with Shaw's DNA to see if he has any relatives, with the DNA revealing that Shaw is Fitz and Simmons' future grandchild.

== Production ==
=== Development ===
On November 22, 2017, before the season premiered, Jeph Loeb announced that the series' 100th episode would include "a significant event" for the series. On February 21, 2018, Marvel announced that the episode would be titled "The Real Deal", and that it would be directed by Kevin Tancharoen and written by executive producers Jed Whedon, Maurissa Tancharoen, and Jeffrey Bell. For "The Real Deal", the 100th episode of the series, instead of the normal title sequence of the season, the series' title featured a montage of all title cards used throughout the series by the episode's airing.

==== Writing ====
Whedon and Tancharoen described the episode as "an emotional game changer" that would affect the season to the point that "nothing will be the same after" it, while Bell said that the episode features "a device that grows out of [the] current storyline and plot that allows [people] to look back" to the series' early seasons, as well as "turn over a couple cards that people will be excited about and then also celebrate the show and people on it", and Loeb said that the episode ends with "stories that perhaps [viewers] didn't even know we haven't revealed". Tancharoen said that the final scene in which Fitz and Simmons are married was included because the creators, after 100 episodes, felt a necessity to do it, which Bell supported by stating that, while writing the episode, "[they] sat down and thought, as fans, what are the kinds of things [they] would want to see? Part of that is paying homage to where we've come from, part of that is a couple of "oh my God" moments, and something looking toward the future that is hopefully something emotional". Whedon said that the episode was written "for those people who had watched them all". Whedon also said that the episode's reveal that Deke is Fitz and Simmons' grandson was put because "[i]t was a way of not just celebrating that they're getting married, but of showing that this isn't just the hope of a happy ending, there actually is one already attending the wedding. To [the writer], it was not just a cool reveal, but a way of seeing their love manifested".

The episode also revealed that Phil Coulson is dying due to the Ghost Rider burning the Kree blood that resurrected him. Whedon said that Coulson came to terms with his death, and that "[i]t's something he actually had to come to terms with a long time ago when he was discovering the T.A.H.I.T.I. Project and everything that had been done to him", and felt the character doesn't want "to go through any of that again. He's ready for nature to take its course. [People] can sense from everybody else in the episode that they're not as willing to let go as he seems to be. Some of that will play out. What happens, [people]'ll have to wait and see, but he seems as much at peace with it as you can be considering there's so much he's done in a world that thinks he's dead", though he also felt Coulson isn't "excited for it".

The episode also introduced a "Fear Dimension", which Whedon said that it was added "to keep [the] team together and have them only facing their internal demons, not to have some outside threat. It was more about a 'pressure cooker' featuring [the characters]". while Bell said that it was also added as "a way for [the production crew] to do 'Greatest Hits', without just doing clips of, "Wow! Remember when...?" It was a way to remind the audience of people and things [the characters] dealt with in the past, and who [they have] become. And with respect to Coulson, it really questioned everything that has happened for the last 100 episodes". Whedon said that "[the writers] ended up getting exactly who we wanted" in featuring Mike Peterson / Deathlok, with Bell stating that "[t]he beautiful thing about J. August [Richards returning] as Mike Peterson is that was [the character's] first case as S.H.I.E.L.D. agents. It really launched the show. And the fact that he came back as both Mike Peterson and as Deathlok was a lot of fun for [the writers]", and Tancharoen stated that "It was a way to bring it full circle".

=== Casting ===
In February 2018, Marvel revealed that main cast members Clark Gregg as Phil Coulson, Ming-Na Wen as Melinda May, Iain De Caestecker as Leo Fitz, Elizabeth Henstridge as Jemma Simmons and Henry Simmons as Alphonso "Mack" Mackenzie, Chloe Bennet as Daisy Johnson / Quake, and Natalia Cordova-Buckley as Elena "Yo-Yo" Rodriguez would reprise their roles in the episode. The episode also features Jeff Ward and Catherine Dent as recurring characters Deke Shaw and General Hale, as well as J. August Richards and Maximilian Osinski reprising their roles as Deathlok and Davis from previous seasons. with Richards' also playing an illusion of his character's former identity Mike Peterson. The antagonists Lash and Hive also return from earlier seasons as illusions created by the "Fear Dimension", though the actors were uncredited.

=== Filming ===
The wedding scene at the end of the episode was filmed in "a very remote location" in the Placerita Canyon State Park. Filming for the episode ended on November 27, 2017, with the cast and crew celebrating by posting a photo in which they appear with a cake resembling a poster for the series, as well as both S.H.I.E.L.D. and recurring antagonist organization Hydra's logos.

== Release ==
=== Broadcast ===
"The Real Deal" was first aired in the United States on ABC on March 9, 2018.

=== Marketing ===
Marvel released three roundtable discussions to promote the episode. The roundtables were hosted by Patton Oswalt, who has portrayed The Koenigs in the series. The first discussion was released on March 8, 2018, featuring Maurissa Tancharoen and the female cast members. The second discussion, released on March 9, featured the full cast, and the third, which debuted on March 12, featured Oswalt with the executive producers. The three roundtables premiered on Marvel.com, and also are available on both Marvel and the series' social media platforms, as well as Marvel's YouTube channel.

==== "The Road to 100" ====
In December 2017, Marvel revealed the Marvel's Agents of S.H.I.E.L.D.: The Road to 100 art program, which was created to commemorate the episode. It features five posters, one for each season of the series, representing "key pivotal moments of each season". The art was also featured as variant covers to select titles published by Marvel Comics in March 2018. Megan Thomas Bradner, Vice President of Development and Production, Live Action at Marvel Television, said that "commemorates these creators, the actors, the characters and a hundred amazing stories", and called reaching 100 episodes "quite a feat... and it felt special enough to share with the fans that got us here. By working with some of our favorite comic artists, we felt we could show a large variety of meaningful moments and the characters that helped get us to a 100." .

The first poster, created by Dale Keown, highlighted the series' first season. It features four panels, showcasing the moment Coulson and Grant Ward approached Skye in her van from the pilot, Coulson learning that he was revived from his wounds by the T.A.H.I.T.I. program and a drug from a half-dissected Kree alien corpse, Grant Ward killing Victoria Hand and revealed himself to be working for Hydra, and Fitz giving Simmons the last remaining oxygen tank while declaring his love for her in the season finale. The second poster was created by Daniel Acuña and highlighted the second season, particularly Coulson writing the Inhuman map on a wall; Johnson coming out of her Terrigenesis cocoon; the S.H.I.E.L.D. team, Bobbi Morse, Lance Hunter, and the "real S.H.I.E.L.D." logo; and May cradling the deceased body of Katya Belyakov in 2008. The third poster, created by Nick Bradshaw, depicted the third season. The poster shows the S.H.I.E.L.D. team and Hive, along with the Hydra logo breaking the S.H.I.E.L.D. logo and its tentacles covering much of the poster. Specific moments highlighted include Fitz and Simmons after she has been pulled from the portal to the alien world Maveth, Coulson killing Ward on that planet, and the formation of the Secret Warriors. For the fourth season, the poster, created by Razzah, displayed the introductions of Ghost Rider, Life Model Decoys (LMD) and the Framework reality, Jeffrey Mace sacrificing himself in the Framework, and Coulson's kiss with the May LMD. The fifth poster, displaying the fifth season, was created by Stonehouse. It featured Kasius and Sinara flanked in either side of the poster, the S.H.I.E.L.D. team and Deke in the center in front of the destroyed Earth in the future, and Fitz reuniting with Simmons.

=== Home media ===
The episode, along with the rest of the fifth season, began streaming on Netflix in the United States on June 17, 2018.

== Reception ==
=== Ratings ===
In the United States the episode received a 0.5/2 percent share among adults between the ages of 18 and 49, meaning that it was seen by 0.5 percent of all households, and 2 percent of all of those watching television at the time of the broadcast. It was watched by 2.04 million viewers during its initial broadcast. Within a week of its release, "The Real Deal" had been watched by 3.78 million U.S. viewers, above the season average of 3.57 million.

=== Critical response ===
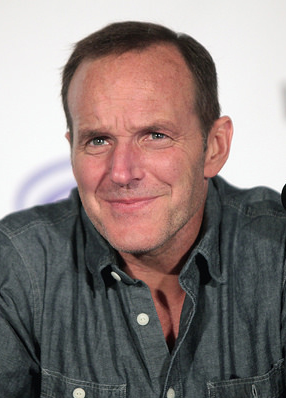
Clark Gregg received praise for his performance in the episode.

Matt Flower of IGN gave the episode an "Amazing" 9.0 rating, writing that the series "went big for its landmark 100th episode, though not in the way you might think. Yes, there was plenty of action, and various elements of danger, but this was a very internal and personal episode with some very grand and wonderful emotional moments", and praising Gregg's performance, stating that "it was very moving" when Coulson was confronted by Deathlok's illusion self, and called the scene in which Daisy confronts Coulson "the most wrenching scene of the episode", and felt that the wedding scene made the episode "even more of an emotional scrambler". Marc Buxton, of Den of Geek, gave the episode a positive review, saying "Marvel has turned a cast of unknowns into some of the most beloved characters in the MCU". He called the episode "self-contained", praising its detraction from the season's main plots. Buxton also noted the episode's reflection on the series' progression adding, "All in all, shocking reveals, a pleasant trip into nostalgia, and an intense mission all remind us why this show has endured".

Alex McLevy of The A.V. Club graded the episode a "B−", and discussed Kevin Tancharoen's direction, saying "it suggests he's more versatile with action than with tear-jerking character beats". He criticised the pacing of the episode, and the season as a whole, saying that it's "only fitfully successful, a reminder the series is struggling to nail its pacing this season." He also compared Phil Coulson, as a central figure, to Buffy Summers, questioning whether the series could continue after his possible departure: "Phil Coulson is Buffy, not Daisy. He's the central figure around which everyone else pivots, and this episode... actually reinforced how crucial his presence is." Danny Hale of Flickering Myth gave a positive review, saying that the episode manages to "deliver some emotional confrontations and new revelations all the while harkening back to the show's roots". However, he noted the episode's pacing issues. Hale singled out Clark Gregg for praise, noting he gives "an extremely moving performance and perfectly conveyed how this man is losing his grasp as Daisy berates him". He also highlighted the wedding between Fitz and Simmons as "perfectly understated". Christina Roberts of Culturess wrote that while the episode "was not as game-changing as the last game-changing episode" it nevertheless "fits for the 100th episode — a lot of grandiose speeches, all the feels, and then a fun, giant nugget of truth at the end". She singled out Chloe Bennet's performance for praise, noting that "it's an episode that hurts. Chloe Bennet makes you feel Daisy's pain in every word she says".
