= Orientation (Agents of S.H.I.E.L.D.) =

- Agents of S.H.I.E.L.D. episodes
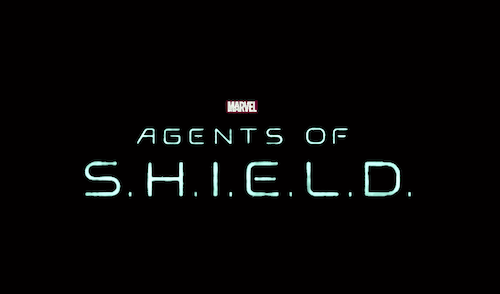
- This episode begins the first pod of episodes with a new typeface logo for the series.
- Episode nos.: Season 5 Episodes 1 and 2
- Directed by: Jesse Bochco; David Solomon
- Written by: Jed Whedon; Maurissa Tancharoen; DJ Doyle
- Cinematography by: Feliks Parnell; Allan Westbrook
- Editing by: Eric Litman; Dexter Adriano
- Original air date: December 1, 2017
- Running time: 86 minutes

Guest appearances
- Jeff Ward as Deke Shaw; Deniz Akdeniz as Virgil; Joel Stoffer as Enoch; Peter Hulne as Jerry; Derek Mears as captain; Eve Harlow as Tess; Dominic Rains as Kasius; Florence Faivre as Sinara; Pruitt Taylor Vince as Grill

Episode chronology
← Previous "World's End"	Next → "A Life Spent"
- Agents of S.H.I.E.L.D. season 5

"Orientation" is the first and second episodes and two-part season premiere of the fifth season of the American television series Agents of S.H.I.E.L.D. Based on the Marvel Comics organization S.H.I.E.L.D., it follows Phil Coulson and his team of S.H.I.E.L.D. agents as they are transported to a future in which the Earth has been destroyed. It is set in the Marvel Cinematic Universe (MCU) and acknowledges the franchise's films. The first part was written by Jed Whedon and Maurissa Tancharoen and directed by Jesse Bochco, with the second part written by DJ Doyle, and directed by David Solomon.

Clark Gregg reprises his role as Coulson from the film series, starring alongside Ming-Na Wen, Chloe Bennet, Iain De Caestecker, Elizabeth Henstridge, Henry Simmons, and Natalia Cordova-Buckley. This marks Cordova-Buckley's first appearance as a series regular, after recurring in previous seasons. A fifth season was ordered in March 2017, and filming began that July. Several new recurring guest stars were announced beginning in August, including Jeff Ward, Eve Harlow, and Pruitt Taylor Vince, who are all introduced in the episodes. The episodes serve as the beginning to the first "pod" of episodes for the season.

"Orientation" originally aired on ABC on December 1, 2017, and according to Nielsen Media Research, was watched by 4.27 million viewers within a week of its release. The episodes received very positive reviews from critics, with many generally highlighting the cast's performances, the introduction of new characters, and felt it was a promising start to the season. The futuristic space setting was especially praised for being "ambitious" and thematically different. "Orientation: Part 1" won a Hollywood Post Alliance Award for Outstanding Visual Effects - Television (Over 13 Episodes) at the 2018 Hollywood Post Alliance Awards, and was nominated for a Visual Effects Society Award for Outstanding Visual Effects in a Photoreal Episode at the 16th Visual Effects Society Awards.

== Plot ==
=== Part one ===
Enoch, an alien, leads a team of commandos to apprehend Phil Coulson and his team after they were framed for the attempted assassination of General Glenn Talbot. While Leo Fitz is left behind, the rest are taken to an unknown location. A white monolith transports them to an outpost in an unknown region of space, where a group of scavengers are under attack from aliens they call "roaches." One of the scavengers, Virgil, tries to explain their situation to Coulson, but is quickly knocked out by Alphonso "Mack" Mackenzie. After they reunite with Elena "Yo-Yo" Rodriguez and Jemma Simmons, Coulson finds an old postcard in Virgil's jacket. Virgil recognizes each of the S.H.I.E.L.D. agents when he regains consciousness. As he begins to explain that he studied their history, he's suddenly killed by one of the roaches. While Daisy Johnson saves the team, Melinda May is injured and sees Deke Shaw, another scavenger. May attacks him but is overpowered. He ties her up and implants a device called a "metric" into her wrist.

The team finds May's jacket and realize the outpost appears to be a human colony. They find a computer, only to trigger an alarm that sends a team of Kree Reapers to their whereabouts. The Kree take Johnson, Coulson and Simmons to a prison, while Mack and Yo-Yo are tied up and tortured. Deke shows up at the prison with May, and convinces the Kree to let them hand over their prisoners to him. Deke tells them Virgil hired him to swap out the team's metrics so the Kree wouldn't notice them. With Virgil dead and the team unable to cover what he's owed, Deke attempts to leave, but May grabs one of Deke's gadgets he used against her earlier to pin him to a wall.

May and Simmons follow Deke's directions to a ship that could send a message to Fitz to rescue them, Johnson heads off to find Mack and Yo-Yo, and Coulson stays behind to get information out of Deke. Johnson frees Mack and the two set out to save Yo-Yo. Gradually, all of them come to realize that the monolith didn't take them into space, but to a future where the Earth has been destroyed, and the outpost is all that remains of humanity. Mack finds a message on the postcard reading "Working on it - Fitz".

=== Part two ===
May and Simmons return to the outpost, where Deke offers to give implant metrics in their wrists so they can blend in. They're suddenly interrupted by Tess, another scavenger, and Deke tells her about Virgil's death. Deke leaves to find Daisy, Mack, and Yo-Yo once Tess offers to double what Virgil owed him, while Tess takes the rest of them to the Exchange, humanity's main living area on the outpost. The outpost, known as the "Lighthouse", was a survival bunker when the Earth was torn in half by a cataclysmic event. The Kree arrived to restore order, and destroyed the historical records to keep humanity focused on their future. Although the Kree often abuse their human subjects, they rely on the Kree for survival.

Tess takes Coulson to Virgil's apartment, where Coulson finds a notebook Virgil hid among the artifacts of the old world he collected. Tess' boss, Grill, confronts her about the ship May and Simmons took out earlier, and says she owes him double now that Virgil is gone. May and Simmons witness one of the Kree's human servants getting stabbed in a fight. The Kree take Simmons away when she looks after his wound rather than let him bleed out. Deke, Johnson, Mack and Yo-Yo meet up with Tess, Coulson and May in the Exchange after they dispose of the Reapers' bodies. Suspicious of Deke's motivations, Johnson follows him to his "gallery", where people pay to enter a Framework simulation to escape the brutal reality of life in the Lighthouse. Johnson passes out when she walks under Deke's transmitter, and finds herself in a simulation with Deke.

The Kree take Simmons to see Kasius, the overseer of the Lighthouse. Kasius orders his enforcer Sinara to begin a "renewal" among the humans. Back in the Exchange, Coulson, Mack and Yo-Yo steal a tablet from a Kree, and give it to Grill in exchange for implanting their metrics. The renewal begins while they are in Grill's shop. The Kree select a group of low earners, each of which will either have to be killed or kill another before the renewal ends. One scavenger sets out to kill Grill for not paying him earlier. Grill leaves Coulson, Mack and Yo-Yo behind as decoys while he goes into hiding. May tries to fight the scavenger off, only for Tess to grab the shotgun and kill him instead. Grill claims the team work for him when a Kree watch commander comes by to check on the renewal's end.

Kasius demands perfection from anyone who represents him, and has Sinara kill the servant that Simmons treated. Kasius places a device into Simmons' ear, causing her to lose her hearing and dim her sight. Meanwhile, Johnson confronts Deke about using the Framework. Deke reminds her that the Earth is gone and humanity is near extinction. Deke pauses a TV playing a news report about Johnson saving Los Angeles. (Note: As depicted in "The Laws of Inferno Dynamics".) He went into the Framework to confirm that Johnson was Quake, the person he believes tore the Earth apart. Later, Simmons becomes one of Kasius' servants, whose voice is the only one she can hear, and Kasius prepared for the arrival of some guests.

== Production ==
=== Development ===
The series was renewed for a fifth season on May 11, 2017, moving to a Friday timeslot of 9:00 pm. In November 2017, Marvel announced that the season premiere of the season would be in two parts, titled "Orientation", with part one written by executive producers Jed Whedon and Maurissa Tancharoen and directed by Jesse Bochco, and part two written by DJ Doyle and directed by David Solomon. It serves as the beginning of the first pod of episodes for the season, which consisted of ten episodes.

=== Writing ===
On how the episodes would tie into the Marvel Cinematic Universe (MCU), Whedon stated that "We try to a little bit follow in the wake of the films as they plot new territory in the MCU. Last year that was magic, with Doctor Strange. We felt like Ghost Rider all of a sudden fit into our show in a way that we didn't necessarily feel like he would have before, tonally. And this is us expanding out even further into the world of space which they very much are living in now in the features. It's the great unknown, and we hadn't explored it yet." Whedon added that it's more about a thematic tie-in at this point than one story leading to another, stating "We try to make it feel like that the whole thing is moving in this swelling direction. We're not in space for no reason. We wouldn't have gone there if they hadn't. The overt ties were a necessity of starting out, but those have faded over time, basically because we have our own mythology."

Discussing the state of the main characters in these episodes, actor Clark Gregg said, "They're suddenly thrown into this world that they don't know anything about, that seems kind of savage... they're suddenly in a world that they don't run and they don't have those kind of powers and have great limitations and they're separated to a certain extent, so finding a way to reestablish themselves as a team is a big, big part of the beginning."

=== Casting ===
In October 2017, Marvel confirmed that principal cast members Clark Gregg as Phil Coulson, Ming-Na Wen as Melinda May, Chloe Bennet as Daisy Johnson / Quake, Iain De Caestecker as Leo Fitz, Elizabeth Henstridge as Jemma Simmons and Henry Simmons as Alphonso "Mack" Mackenzie. They are joined by Natalia Cordova-Buckley as Elena "Yo-Yo" Rodriguez, who is promoted from her recurring role in the third and fourth seasons.

Jeff Ward was cast in a recurring role in August 2017, and was revealed in October to be portraying Deke Shaw, alongside other newcomers Eve Harlow as Tess and Pruitt Taylor Vince as Grill. In November 2017, Marvel confirmed that Ward would appear in part one, alongside Joel Stoffer as Enoch, Jordan Preston as driver, Peter Hulne as Jerry, John Wusah as young soldier, Deniz Akdeniz as Virgil, Nathin Butler as Jones and Derek Mears as captain. In part two, the guest cast include Ward, Harlow, Vince, Mears, Dominic Rains as Kasius, Florence Faivre as Sinara, Paul Duna as Reese, Kaleti Williams as Zev, James Babson as Holt, Tunisha Hubbard as Ava, Wes Armstrong as Rick and Jay Hunter as watch commander.

=== Design ===
The episode introduces a new typeface logo and title card for the series. Jamie Lovett of ComicBook.com said, "Fans will know that these episodes are meant to be something special when the episode dispenses with the usual title card treatment and instead implements a logo fade-in". He compared this title card to that used for the episode "4,722 Hours".

=== Filming and visual effects ===
Filming for the season began on July 20, 2017. Henstridge expressed how different filming her role was for this season stating, "She's always been so headstrong and kind of arrogant to a point where she feels like her brain is the best and who cares about anything else. So this is just a completely different realm for her and she hates every second of it. So it's brilliant and it was very frustrating to film because you just can't really do anything. You just have to be still. She has zero power and could be killed at any second." For the design of the "roaches", Whedon and Tancharoen took inspiration from the 1979 horror film Alien. The actors were shown what the creatures would like in the scene. Cordova-Buckley said "I'm terrified of them. It's kind of fun to now be in a show where the enemy is aliens, and all kinds. I love Ridley Scott's first Alien so it's really fun to be doing another world and all of us getting to do that together."

=== Marvel Cinematic Universe tie-ins ===
In November 2017, Whedon said that the season would not have moved the characters to space if the recent MCU films like Guardians of the Galaxy Vol. 2 and Thor: Ragnarok (both 2017) had not been exploring that part of the MCU, but that this would remain a "thematic tie". He explained that they had moved on from the overt tie-ins with the MCU films that the series utilized in earlier seasons because "we have our own mythology. That started to be much more interesting to us, and hopefully to the audience ... No one wants to come to see our show to see another show." The season features the Kree, an alien race that previously appeared in the first three seasons, and in the film Guardians of the Galaxy (2014).

== Release ==
=== Broadcast ===
"Orientation" was first aired in the United States on ABC on December 1, 2017.

=== Marketing ===
At New York Comic Con on October 7, 2017, the main cast appeared to promote the season, where they premiered the first 20 minutes of "Orientation". A shortened version of the footage was released by ABC and Marvel on November 26, 2017, a week before the episode's airing.

=== Home media ===
The episodes, along with the rest of the fifth season, began streaming on Netflix in the United States on June 17, 2018.

== Reception ==
=== Ratings ===
In the United States the episode received a 0.7/3 percent share among adults between the ages of 18 and 49, meaning that it was seen by 0.7 percent of all households, and 3 percent of all of those watching television at the time of the broadcast. It was watched by 2.54 million viewers. This marked the lowest-rated season premiere of the series. Within a week of its release, "Orientation" had been watched by 4.27 million U.S. viewers, above the season average of 3.57 million.

=== Critical response ===
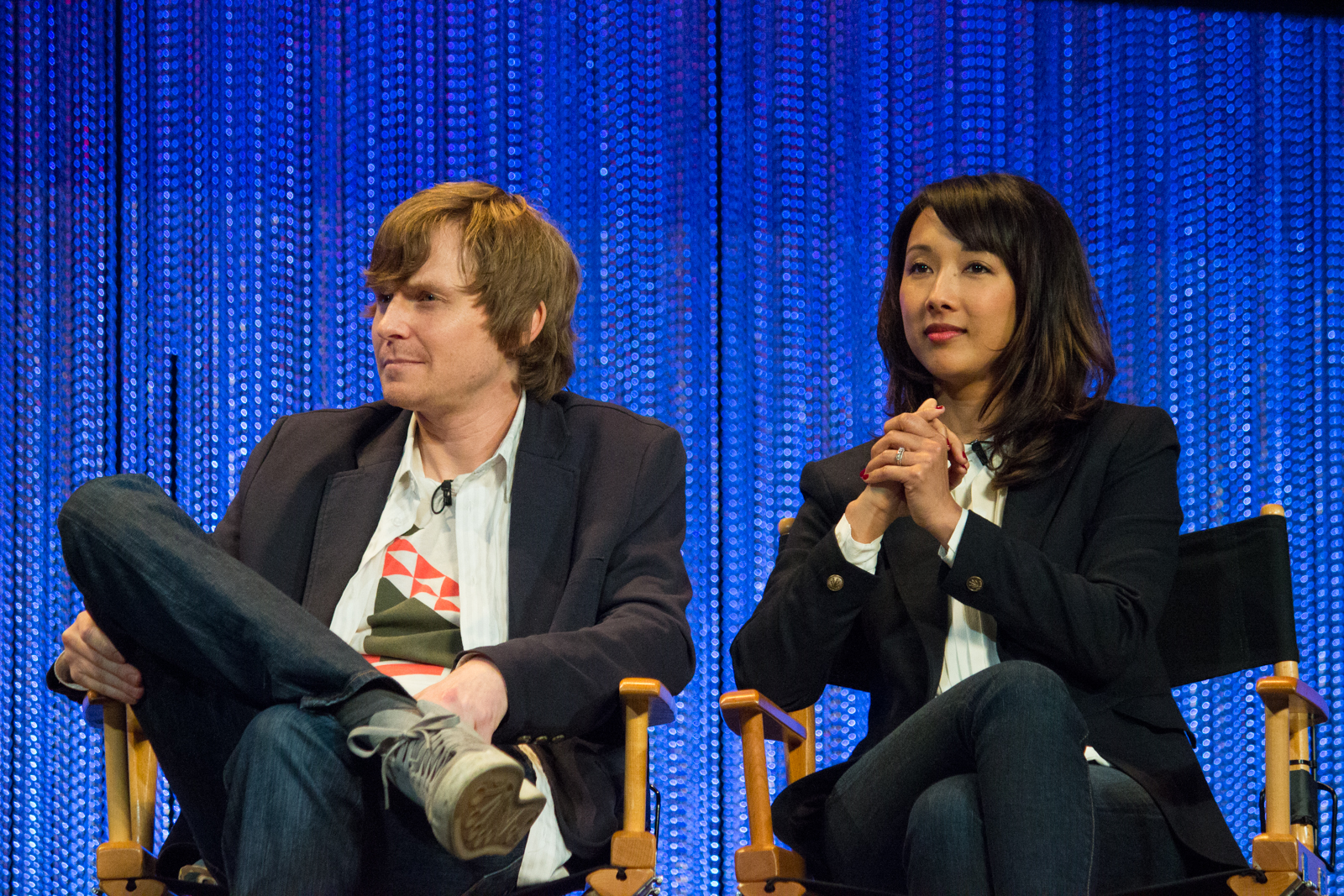
Showrunners Jed Whedon and Maurissa Tancharoen, who co-wrote "Part One", were praised for taking the series in a new thematic direction.

Matt Fowler of IGN scored the premiere 8 out of 10, indicating a "great" episode and praising it as a "soft reboot" for the series. Fowler praised the episodes as "solid (if not claustrophobic) entertainment". He noted that the first part felt like a "mysterious space horror story" and the second part was a "full-throttle remake/remodel of Agents of SHIELD as a series". He complimented the humor of these episodes, as it helped "ease viewers into such a large, and possibly series ending, premise." He noticed that the characters are "strong enough to go off on an adventure totally separate from anything Shield-related - that they can just be their own special band of adventurers." He questioned the importance of the new characters asking, "How invested should we be in what's happening in the future, humanity-wise, if the idea is for everything to somehow get course corrected?"

The A.V. Club's Alex McLevy graded the episodes an "A−" and praised the move to space, saying that "if season four was Agents of S.H.I.E.L.D. firing on all cylinders, especially during its stellar 'Agents of Hydra' arc in the Framework, then this is the look of a show that knows it has mastered its storytelling, and is confidently expanding the scope of its ambition." He noted that part one "works a little better" than part two, but they're both "excellent installments that can stand on their own, narrative-wise." He described the opening 20 minutes of the premiere as a "miniature Twilight Zone". Levy felt that Mack's attitude towards the team's predicament was a "remnant of being forced out of the Framework (and away from the daughter he presumably remembers all too well) at the end of last season." Danny Hale of Flickering Myth gave the premiere a positive review, in particular praising the development of Simmons. He noted that "her character has become so strong and resilient over the years and her almost jaded attitude when put in front of Kasius was so refreshing. She knows she should probably be afraid of this man but she can't seem to care enough to bow to him." He also complimented the new additions to the cast, calling Kasius "interesting" who is established as more than just "generic bad guy". He also praised the performances of Ward and Harlow as Deke and Tess, predicting they will likely have the most interactions with the principal cast.

Evan Valentine of Collider gave the premiere a "good" rating of 3 stars out of 5, saying that the series "manages to make a welcome and interesting return here, though not one that reaches the heights of its last season yet." He praised the chemistry of the principal cast stating, "the cast chemistry is firing on all cylinders, and while they may have a bump in the road when it comes to some of the new supporting characters, the core members of the team are still a delight to watch." He unfavorably compared the new characters to Ghost Rider from the previous season saying they lack the "same bite". He also expressed his hopes for the series to explore others parts of the MCU, since the Kree are already an established race within the universe. Marc Buxton of Den of Geek gave the episodes a positive review, saying the series "gives the characters and the viewers a sense of displacement with tonnes of world building and new characters being introduced at a breakneck pace." He complimented the episodes for exploring new genres, in particular post-apocalyptic science-fiction, He noted that "This whole genre switch has really allowed the series to reinvent itself here in the fifth season", calling the episodes an "unexpected, claustrophobic, two-hour sci-fi trip and a whole new lease on life for the series."

=== Accolades ===
"Orientation: Part 1" won a Hollywood Post Alliance Award for Outstanding Visual Effects - Television (Over 13 Episodes) at the 2018 Hollywood Post Alliance Awards, and was nominated for a Visual Effects Society Award for Outstanding Visual Effects in a Photoreal Episode at the 16th Visual Effects Society Awards, but lost to the Game of Thrones episode "Beyond the Wall".
