= Agents of S.H.I.E.L.D. season 5 =

Agents of S.H.I.E.L.D.
- Season 5
- Promotional poster
- Showrunners: Jed Whedon; Maurissa Tancharoen; Jeffrey Bell
- Starring: Clark Gregg; Ming-Na Wen; Chloe Bennet; Iain De Caestecker; Elizabeth Henstridge; Henry Simmons; Natalia Cordova-Buckley
- No. of episodes: 22

Release
- Original network: ABC
- Original release: December 1, 2017 – May 18, 2018

Season chronology
- ← Previous; Season 4 Next → Season 6

The fifth season of the American television series Agents of S.H.I.E.L.D., based on the Marvel Comics spy organization S.H.I.E.L.D., follows Phil Coulson and other S.H.I.E.L.D. agents and allies as they try to save the world from an apocalyptic future. It is set in the Marvel Cinematic Universe (MCU) and acknowledges the continuity of the franchise's films. The season was produced by ABC Studios, Marvel Television, and Mutant Enemy Productions, with Jed Whedon, Maurissa Tancharoen, and Jeffrey Bell serving as showrunners.

Clark Gregg reprises his role as Coulson from the film series, starring alongside returning series regulars Ming-Na Wen, Chloe Bennet, Iain De Caestecker, Elizabeth Henstridge, and Henry Simmons. They are joined by Natalia Cordova-Buckley who was promoted from her recurring guest role since the third season. The fifth season was ordered in May 2017. Due to its broadcast schedule, the season was split into two "pods": the first sees the S.H.I.E.L.D. team transported to a future in which the Earth has been destroyed; in the second, they attempt to prevent this future in the present. The end of the season dovetails with the events of the film Avengers: Infinity War (2018). The season includes the series' 100th episode as well as Gregg's directorial debut for the series.

The fifth season premiered on December 1, 2017, and ran for 22 episodes on ABC until May 18, 2018. The two-part premiere debuted to 2.54 million viewers, marking a significant downturn from previous seasons. Despite consistently low viewership, critical reception of the season was positive, with many commending the series for its ambition, in particular praising the futuristic space setting during its first half and its exploration of time travel. The series was renewed for a sixth season in May 2018.

== Episodes ==
| No. overall | No. in season | Title | Directed by | Written by | Original release date | U.S. viewers (millions) |
|---|---|---|---|---|---|---|
| 89 | 1 | "Orientation" | Jesse Bochco | Jed Whedon & Maurissa Tancharoen | December 1, 2017 | 2.54 |
| 90 | 2 | "Orientation" | David Solomon | DJ Doyle | December 1, 2017 | 2.54 |
An unknown group seizes Phil Coulson, Melinda May, Daisy Johnson, Jemma Simmons, Alphonso "Mack" Mackenzie, and Elena "Yo-Yo" Rodriguez and transports them to a space station through a monolith; Leo Fitz is left behind. Upon arrival, the team is heralded by Virgil, who dies soon after. They quickly regroup and meet Deke Shaw who reveals that, to his knowledge, the space station, known as the Lighthouse, was built nearly ninety years prior. Hoping to send a message back to Earth, May and Simmons discover the planetary wreckage near the Lighthouse is, in fact, Earth, which has been torn apart by a cataclysmic event. At the same time, Coulson discovers that the monolith transported them not through space, but forward through time. Elsewhere, Mack and Yo-Yo are held captive by the Kree, who maintain control of the station by encouraging bloodshed among its inhabitants. Back on the station, the team attempts to blend in by agreeing to work for Grill and meets Tess, who saves them during a "kill or be killed" event known as the Renewal. Coulson goes with Tess to learn more about Virgil's message and finds a hidden notebook. Meanwhile, Simmons is taken to meet Kasius, the Kree leader of the station, and is inducted as one of his servants. Later on, Daisy confronts Deke in his framework simulation, where he states she is the reason the Earth was torn apart.
| 91 | 3 | "A Life Spent" | Kevin Hooks | Nora Zuckerman & Lilla Zuckerman | December 8, 2017 | 1.93 |
In preparation for Lady Basha's arrival, Simmons is given the task of helping an Inhuman control her new abilities for her exhibition ceremony. Simmons is successful, but becomes distraught when Kasius sells her to Lady Basha. While the team adapts to their new jobs, Grill becomes suspicious of the new arrivals and sends one of his men to spy on them. During a space expedition, Coulson, May, Mack, and Tess struggle to make sense of Virgil's notebook and discover a radio transmission supposedly originating from the Earth's surface. Grill's spy reports back, only to be framed as a traitor and exiled to die on Earth. Meanwhile, Yo-Yo helps Daisy get ahold of a Kree tablet to try and save Simmons. However, her mission is thwarted by Deke, who reports Daisy to Kasius and gets her captured.
| 92 | 4 | "A Life Earned" | Stan Brooks | Drew Z. Greenberg | December 15, 2017 | 1.84 |
Daisy meets Ben, one of Kasius' other champions, capable of telepathy. Using Ben to corroborate their story, Kasius interrogates Daisy and Simmons about the others. They are able to convince Kasius they came alone, though he remains suspicious. During the interrogation, Ben learns that Kasius intends to destroy the station and everyone on it once he acquires enough profits to leave. Deke returns to the others to gather new information as they learn about the mysterious Level 35. Recognizing his father's voice on the radio transmission, Deke agrees to help them gain access to the restricted floor. There, they discover that Kasius is attempting to breed Inhumans. May also discovers Deke lied about Daisy's whereabouts, but gets interrupted by Sinara. Coulson leaves with Deke while May fights Sinara alone. Meanwhile, Grill sends Mack to confront someone who owes him payment. Later, Fitz is revealed to be one of the bidders who has arrived for Daisy's exhibition.
| 93 | 5 | "Rewind" | Jesse Bochco | Craig Titley | December 22, 2017 | 2.40 |
Shortly after the others are taken from the diner, Fitz is taken into military custody and interrogated by General Hale and her subordinates about the others' whereabouts, as well as their involvement in the assassination attempt on General Glenn Talbot (Note: As depicted in "World's End".) and the deaths of Jeffrey Mace and Holden Radcliffe. For the next six months, Fitz is given special privileges to allow him to locate the team, but he fails. With help from Lance Hunter, Fitz escapes the military facility and tracks down Enoch, the man who took the others. Enoch explains that a prophecy foretold these events and takes them to meet Robin, the daughter of Charles Hinton who expresses her prophetic abilities through drawings. Tracked by the military, Enoch helps them escape to a secret bunker where Fitz learns that he was left behind so he could save the team. Determined to help them, Fitz and Hunter break back into Hale's military facility to obtain a cryogenic pod; they find all their old S.H.I.E.L.D. tech, including the Zephyr One, which they use to escape. Using the pod, Fitz is put to sleep for the next 74 years. He is awakened by Enoch, who prepares him for their arrival at the Lighthouse.
| 94 | 6 | "Fun & Games" | Clark Gregg | Brent Fletcher | January 5, 2018 | 2.49 |
Down in the station, the Kree have harvested some of the youth for an unscheduled terrigenesis ceremony. Flint, a friend of Tess, experiences a successful terrigenesis and is taken into hiding with the team by Yo-Yo. Tess is hanged for Flint's disappearance. During a dinner with the other bidders, Fitz quickly proves himself a formidable character, earning Kasius' respect. The first exhibition is then held between Ben and May, resulting in May being sent to the surface while Ben is killed for lying during Daisy's interrogation. Meanwhile, Grill finds the team and holds them captive until Flint saves them, killing Grill with geokinesis. The unexpected arrival of Kasius' brother prompts Sinara to battle Daisy as her exhibition, during which Daisy, Fitz, and Simmons are able to subdue the others and escape. During the escape, Simmons proposes to Fitz.
| 95 | 7 | "Together or Not at All" | Brad Turner | Matt Owens | January 12, 2018 | 2.31 |
On the surface, Enoch finds May, but their meeting is cut short by an approaching gravity storm. A mysterious figure captures them. Daisy, Fitz, and Simmons are hunted throughout the station and discover the station is being sustained by gravitonium. Fitz is shot during the chase. Deke finds them and takes them to the rest of the team. Reunited, the team plots their escape to the Earth's surface by using a trawler and Deke's anti-gravity device. After learning about Tess' death, Flint decides to stay on the station to protect the remaining inhabitants. Mack and Yo-Yo agree to stay behind and help him. Coulson, Daisy, Fitz, Simmons, and Deke fly to the surface, but get caught in the gravity storm. Meanwhile, Kasius kills his brother and plots to regain his father's acceptance by recapturing Daisy with help from Sinara. On the surface, the mysterious figure takes Enoch and May to safety, where they are greeted by an elderly Robin.
| 96 | 8 | "The Last Day" | Nina Lopez-Corrado | James C. Oliver & Sharla Oliver | January 19, 2018 | 2.41 |
Coulson, Daisy, Fitz, Simmons, and Deke survive the crash and reunite with May in the Zephyr. They meet Samuel Voss, an acquaintance of Deke's father. Up on the Lighthouse, Kasius punishes the inhabitants by cutting off their resources. Flint, Mack, and Yo-Yo go to retrieve the weapons hidden by Fitz and discover Kasius has released the Vrellnexians onto the lower levels. They defeat the Vrellnexians and rescue the remaining inhabitants. On the surface, the team struggles to get answers from Robin and finds a machine built into the Zephyr. While Fitz and Simmons attempt to remove Daisy's inhibitor, May and Coulson find a shard of the time monolith in Voss' locker. Deke questions Voss about the shard, which belonged to his parents, and gets knocked out. Voss then tries to kill Daisy and impales Robin to prevent her from giving the team answers. Before dying, Robin is comforted by May as she reveals their history and finally tells May how to save the world, a method that will require Flint. In the past, May is shown taking care of Robin and encouraging Fitz to build his machine so they can travel through time.
| 97 | 9 | "Best Laid Plans" | Garry A. Brown | George Kitson | January 26, 2018 | 2.27 |
As the gravity storm worsens, the team attempts to relaunch the Zephyr. May reveals that, using the shard, Flint can recreate the monolith, allowing the team to travel back through time. Similar to the Lighthouse, Fitz and Simmons find gravitonium on the Zephyr and realize the designs were manufactured by Fitz himself. On the station, Flint, Mack, and Yo-Yo successfully gain control of the lower levels. Tess is resurrected by Kasius and sent to relay his demands, threatening to kill everyone by detonating explosives if they are not met. Mack and Yo-Yo retaliate by placing the explosives on Level 35, the medical floor, which would prevent Kasius from breeding more Inhumans. During a standoff with Kasius, Flint evacuates the inhabitants to the upper levels and uses the remaining explosives to separate them from the lower levels, out of Kasius' reach. Using the gravity storm to her advantage, May navigates the Zephyr into space as Daisy battles Sinara again, this time killing her. Daisy then contacts Mack while the team heads for the Lighthouse. Kasius reveals he has his own seer telling him what will happen.
| 98 | 10 | "Past Life" | Eric Laneuville | DJ Doyle | February 2, 2018 | 2.22 |
While Enoch stays on the Zephyr, the team focuses on getting to Flint and rescuing the other Inhumans from captivity. Distraught over Sinara's death, Kasius infects Tye, the Inhuman trainer, with odium, a substance that excites maniacal behavior, and sends him after the team. During a fight with Tye, Coulson seemingly gets infected. Kasius' seer is revealed to be Yo-Yo from the future, one who has lived through the time loop and endured endless torture. She reveals that the team's ultimate return will bring about the end of the world and that the only solution is to let Coulson succumb to his infection. As Flint recreates the monolith, Mack leaves to find Yo-Yo and witnesses her future self's death by Kasius, who consumes the remaining odium and fights him. With help from Simmons, Mack kills Kasius and reunites with Yo-Yo, who is still alive in their timeline. Deke returns to the Zephyr in time to save Enoch and fix the machine, although seemingly at the cost of both of their lives, as the team returns to the present.
| 99 | 11 | "All the Comforts of Home" | Kate Woods | Drew Z. Greenberg | March 2, 2018 | 1.90 |
Back in their time, the team meets Noah, Enoch's successor, who has been monitoring the world from the Lighthouse in their absence. Coulson, May, Fitz, Simmons, Mack, and Yo-Yo investigate a beacon emitting from Earth that fits Voss' description of the first signs of the end. Reluctant to join the team, Daisy stays behind and discovers that Deke survived the explosion. After he is arrested, Daisy is forced to leave the bunker to save him and prevent him from exposing the team, who are now most wanted. Upon finding the beacon, the team reunites with Agent Piper, who is revealed to be working for General Hale. They are then ambushed by a group of Hale's robotic soldiers, led by an assassin. During the fight, the assassin attempts to kill Mack with their chakram, but Yo-Yo blocks the attack and loses both her arms. Piper realigns with the team as they retreat to the Lighthouse with the beacon, which detonates as Noah sacrifices himself to save Daisy and Fitz. Later, General Hale criticizes the assassin, revealed to be her daughter, Ruby, for jeopardizing the operation. In Philadelphia, General Hale recruits Carl Creel to join her team and he reluctantly agrees.
| 100 | 12 | "The Real Deal" | Kevin Tancharoen | Jed Whedon & Maurissa Tancharoen & Jeffrey Bell | March 9, 2018 | 2.04 |
The beacon's explosion destroys three monoliths that were being stored in the bunker, creating a dimensional rift that manifests the fears of the team. Using gravitonium, Fitz creates a device capable of sealing the rift; Coulson volunteers to deliver the device, but then collapses. The team finds out about his infection, a result of the Ghost Rider burning off the life-sustaining GH-325 drug within him. The team is forced to accelerate their plan when Yo-Yo is attacked by the manifestation of a Simmons Life Model Decoy (LMD). Coulson sends Deke to the surface to call for backup, then proceeds alone to seal the rift. He encounters a manifestation of Mike Peterson, who claims that Coulson's experiences are just a dream and that he is dying on an operating table after the Battle of New York. Coulson overcomes his fear and is saved by the real Peterson, who responds to Deke's call and arrives with several other S.H.I.E.L.D. agents. Coulson and Peterson fight off manifestations of Vrellnexians, Lash, and Hive before managing to contain the rift. Later, the team organizes a wedding ceremony for Fitz and Simmons. General Hale, who is investigating sightings of Daisy, finds evidence that Deke is related to Fitz and Simmons.
| 101 | 13 | "Principia" | Brad Turner | Craig Titley | March 16, 2018 | 2.07 |
When the rift begins to reopen, Fitz sends the team to search for more gravitonium. The team hunts down a lead in Baton Rouge; Mack reunites with his school mate, Tony Caine, who has been helping to redeem scientists coerced into working for Hydra through Cybertek Industries. Caine states that the gravitonium was in transport aboard the Principia, a Cybertek ship that went missing. Deke realizes the gravitonium may have been activated by the lightning storm, sending the Principia into the sky. Following Deke's theory, the team finds the Principia suspended in the atmosphere and discovers most of the gravitonium is gone, leaving only a small portion to sustain the ship. As Mack collects the remaining gravitonium, a group of Hale's robotic soldiers ambushes them. The team successfully escapes the ship before it plummets back to Earth. Upon hearing his mother's saying in an exchange between Simmons and Yo-Yo, Deke realizes Fitz and Simmons are his grandparents. Meanwhile, General Hale continues to form her team by attempting to recruit Werner von Strucker, whose memory was enhanced after S.H.I.E.L.D. revived him from a vegetative state. (Note: As depicted in "Bouncing Back".) While Strucker initially rejects Hale's offer, Ruby convinces him to stay.
| 102 | 14 | "The Devil Complex" | Nina Lopez-Corrado | Matt Owens | March 23, 2018 | 2.07 |
When Simmons is attacked by the manifestation of an astronaut, Fitz accelerates work on sealing the rift, but struggles to figure out how to compress the gravitonium. Under stress, Fitz encounters his Framework alter ego, The Doctor, who taunts him. On the Zephyr, Coulson, May, and Agent Piper capture General Hale; however, she reveals she was prepared for such an occasion and threatens to detonate explosives strapped to Creel if S.H.I.E.L.D. fails to comply. Anton Ivanov arrives and Coulson agrees to accompany them, despite May's unease. Simmons, Mack, and Yo-Yo are attacked by one of the robots that Mack brought back from the Principia. While dealing with technical malfunctions, Daisy is rendered unconscious by another robot and awakens restrained by The Doctor. Simmons finds Fitz removing Daisy's inhibitor. She deduces that The Doctor was not a result of the fear dimension, but a projection of Fitz's internal turmoil. He reprogrammed the robots to isolate Daisy, whose powers he is using to compress the gravitonium and seal the rift completely. Deke attempts to comfort Simmons while also revealing himself as their grandson. Later, Hale speaks to her mysterious benefactor, Qovas, who hands her a vial of odium and reminds her of her Hydra allegiance.
| 103 | 15 | "Rise and Shine" | Jesse Bochco | Iden Baghdadchi | March 30, 2018 | 1.88 |
28 years ago, a young Hale was assigned by Daniel Whitehall to infiltrate the United States Air Force and be impregnated via in vitro fertilization with Ruby, Hydra's next leader. In the present, Hale fails to convince a recently-awakened Talbot to release Hydra contraband. She also informs Coulson that an alien alliance known as the Confederacy made contact with Hydra and offered to assist Earth during an impending invasion; she intends to betray the alliance by using Whitehall's particle-infusion chamber and the gravitonium to create a Destroyer of Worlds. Though she intends for it to be Ruby, she suggests Daisy may be a better fit. Upon hearing this, Coulson denies her offer and reveals his trip to the future, but she doesn't believe him. Back at the Lighthouse, May and Daisy struggle to deduce Hale's motivations and locate Coulson. Daisy, who has been left as the de facto head of S.H.I.E.L.D., refuses to trust Fitz and goes in search of Robin. Simmons tells Fitz about their relation to Deke, suggesting they will survive despite the odds.
| 104 | 16 | "Inside Voices" | Salli Richardson-Whitfield | Mark Leitner | April 6, 2018 | 2.08 |
Under Hale's orders, Creel attempts to absorb the gravitonium and begins to see flashes of Franklin Hall. In anguish from his exposure to the gravitonium, Creel works with Coulson and Talbot to escape. Hale sends Ruby after them as Creel stays behind, allowing Coulson and Talbot to escape via the Confederacy's teleportation device. Meanwhile, Daisy and May locate Robin, who has long since stopped drawing her visions after seeing her own death in the future. Upon seeing May, Robin begins to draw again, this time showing Coulson and Talbot's location in the mountains. Back at the Lighthouse, Simmons convinces Yo-Yo to help her free Fitz and pursue possible leads on Hydra's gravitonium-powered weapon. Together, they get Mack to release Fitz and then lock him up instead. A flashback to four years ago reveals that Ian Quinn was tricked by Raina into being absorbed by the gravitonium.
| 105 | 17 | "The Honeymoon" | Garry A. Brown | James C. Oliver & Sharla Oliver | April 13, 2018 | 1.82 |
Ruby pursues Coulson and Talbot in the mountains, but Daisy arrives in time to save them. Deke, in an attempt to cover for Daisy, is shot by Hale and her men, forcing S.H.I.E.L.D. to retreat. Deke is taken back to the Lighthouse, where Mack and Piper operate on him and successfully save him. May confronts Coulson about his recent actions and eventually admits her feelings for him. Ruby, furious about her mother's attitude, decides to rebel and lock Hale in her cell while she takes over and works with Strucker. Fitz, Simmons, and Yo-Yo travel to a Hydra facility in England, where they find the particle infusion chamber. Fitz damages one of the components to render it useless, but they are then surrounded by robot soldiers. Yo-Yo attempts to escape and call for backup, but is forced to fight Ivanov. As she emerges victorious, she learns that Ivanov's body is linked to all the robots and thus is able to disable them altogether. However, Ruby and Strucker arrive and decide to capture Fitz and Simmons in order to have them repair the infusion chamber. Meanwhile, Daisy helps Talbot contact his family, but unknowingly helps activate his brainwashing through his wife, Carla, who has been compromised by Hydra.
| 106 | 18 | "All Roads Lead..." | Jennifer Lynch | George Kitson | April 20, 2018 | 1.67 |
After locating Blue Raven Ridge, Daisy and May are sent to apprehend Hale, who willingly surrenders after Creel informs her of Quinn and Hall's consciousnesses within the gravitonium. She reveals that Ruby plans to become the Destroyer of Worlds and takes them to her. They arrive at the site just as Ruby begins the infusion process, but Strucker is forced to stop the process at 8%. Unable to control the element, Ruby inadvertently crushes Strucker's skull, killing him. While May extracts Fitz and Simmons, Daisy and Hale attempt to calm down Ruby. Yo-Yo returns for Daisy; upon realizing Ruby is the Destroyer of Worlds and the one who cut her arms off, she slices Ruby's neck with her own chakram in retaliation. Ruby's body releases a blast of energy as Hale escapes. Back at the Lighthouse, Talbot attempts to kidnap Robin, but Coulson and Mack manage to subdue him. Later, Hale is seen in the Confederacy ship, where she reveals S.H.I.E.L.D.'s possession of the gravitonium to Qovas.
| 107 | 19 | "Option Two" | Kevin Tancharoen | Nora Zuckerman & Lilla Zuckerman | April 27, 2018 | 1.68 |
Coulson puts the base on lockdown as Qovas and his Confederacy ship appear above River's End. Despite this, Qovas' troops, the Remorath scavengers, are able to teleport inside in pursuit of the gravitonium. While Coulson, May, Mack, Fitz, and Deke defend the control room, Yo-Yo retrieves Talbot and proceeds to the lab where Simmons, Piper, and Davis are guarding the gravitonium. Yo-Yo, Piper, and Davis attempt to clear the halls when Talbot ices Simmons and places himself in the particle infusion chamber, absorbing the remaining gravitonium. With his new powers, he is able to rescue the S.H.I.E.L.D. agents before taking off with Coulson to an unknown location. Meanwhile, Daisy relocates Robin and Polly with the help of Caine, who also gives her the Centipede serum, which was once used to keep John Garrett alive. However, Caine failed to retrieve a special ingredient, prompting Daisy to dig up her mother's grave.
| 108 | 20 | "The One Who Will Save Us All" | Cherie Gierhart | Brent Fletcher | May 4, 2018 | 1.65 |
After arriving on Qovas' ship, Talbot assumes leadership and demands an audience with the Confederacy. To prove himself, Talbot displays control over his new abilities by killing one of the leaders and taking his place in the alliance. Kasius' father, Taryan, attempts to manipulate Talbot into increasing his powers by revealing untapped subterranean deposits of gravitonium on Earth, which would allow him to save the world from Thanos' imminent invasion. (Note: During the events of Avengers: Infinity War.) Coulson and Hale fail to convince him of Taryan's true motives and are forced to comply. Back at the Lighthouse, an odium-powered Remorath warrior attacks Mack before succumbing to the substance. As Simmons studies the odium, Daisy returns with Jiaying's corpse and the Centipede serum, tasking her to find a cure to save Coulson. Meanwhile, the team equips the Zephyr with gravitonium for space travel and proceeds to Qovas' ship. Daisy and May infiltrate the ship, but are forced to surrender when Talbot incapacitates Daisy. Talbot kills Hale after she attempts to trigger Talbot's brainwashing. Later, Daisy is imprisoned and awakens to Taryan, who plans to take her back to his home world.
| 109 | 21 | "The Force of Gravity" | Kevin Tancharoen | Drew Z. Greenberg & Craig Titley | May 11, 2018 | 1.94 |
As an unconscious Daisy is being transported, Taryan communicates with her using a device. Daisy destroys the device and awakens, then evades her captors. After Talbot leaves on a Quinjet for Earth, Deke rescues Coulson and May, then reunites with Daisy. At a hospital, Talbot approaches Creel and offers him peace by turning him into gravitonium; he then absorbs Creel. Deducing Talbot's desire to prove himself a good father, Mack and Yo-Yo track him to his family's home. Talbot threatens the agents; his son George dissuades him from causing further harm and he leaves to prove his heroism. Meanwhile, Coulson leaves with Daisy on the Zephyr while May duels with Qovas and Deke redirects the missiles to target the ship itself. May and Deke successfully teleport back to Earth as Qovas perishes along with the ship. On the Zephyr, Coulson is attacked by a Remorath and begins to bleed out as his condition worsens. At the Lighthouse, Fitz and Simmons explain that the remaining Centipede serum could be combined with Jiaying's DNA or odium, which would respectively allow the team to save Coulson or stop Talbot. On the Quinjet, Talbot holds Polly and Robin captive, asking the latter for the gravitonium's location.
| 110 | 22 | "The End" | Jed Whedon | Jed Whedon & Maurissa Tancharoen | May 18, 2018 | 1.88 |
The team argues about the usage of the Centipede serum until May destroys the odium vial. Deke advises Daisy to help unite the team and settle their differences. Under coercion, Robin informs Talbot of a gravitonium deposit in Chicago, to which he commandeers Qovas' ship. Daisy chooses Mack to lead S.H.I.E.L.D. and he coordinates the team as they evacuate as many civilians as possible. Simmons provides Coulson with the Centipede serum, but he refuses to take it and discreetly hides it in Daisy's gauntlets while convincing her to face Talbot alone. Daisy attempts to appeal to Talbot's patriotism, but Talbot attacks and attempts to absorb her. Discovering the serum, Daisy injects herself with it and uses her enhanced abilities to blast Talbot into space, thus changing the timeline. While rescuing Polly and Robin from Qovas' ship, Fitz is mortally wounded by falling debris, May and Mack staying by his side as he dies. Simmons resolves to find the present version of Fitz, who is in stasis aboard Enoch's ship. After bidding his fellow agents farewell, Coulson is accompanied by May as he leaves S.H.I.E.L.D. to spend his last days in Tahiti.

== Cast and characters ==
=== Main ===
- Clark Gregg as Phil Coulson
- Ming-Na Wen as Melinda May
- Chloe Bennet as Daisy Johnson / Quake
- Iain De Caestecker as Leo Fitz
- Elizabeth Henstridge as Jemma Simmons
- Henry Simmons as Alphonso "Mack" Mackenzie
- Natalia Cordova-Buckley as Elena "Yo-Yo" Rodriguez

=== Recurring ===
- Jeff Ward as Deke Shaw
- Joel Stoffer as Enoch
- Eve Harlow as Tess
- Dominic Rains as Kasius
- Florence Faivre as Sinara
- Pruitt Taylor Vince as Grill
- Coy Stewart as Flint
- Catherine Dent as Hale
- Lola Glaudini as Polly Hinton
- Dove Cameron as Ruby Hale
- Brian Patrick Wade as Carl Creel
- Briana Venskus as Piper
- Maximilian Osinski as Davis
- Spencer Treat Clark as Werner von Strucker
- Peter Mensah as Qovas
- Adrian Pasdar as Glenn Talbot / Graviton

=== Notable guests ===
- Nick Blood as Lance Hunter
- J. August Richards as Mike Peterson / Deathlok
- Zach McGowan as Anton Ivanov / The Superior
- Reed Diamond as Daniel Whitehall
- Adam Faison as Jasper Sitwell
- Joey Defore as Wolfgang von Strucker
- Ruth Negga as Raina
- David Conrad as Ian Quinn

== Production ==
=== Development ===
In January 2017, ahead of the mid-season premiere of the fourth season of Agents of S.H.I.E.L.D., ABC's Channing Dungey said that she was "very bullish" about S.H.I.E.L.D.'s future, feeling that "the episodes just keep getting better and stronger". The series was renewed for a fifth season of 22 episodes on May 11, with ABC looking to lower the cost of the series moving forward, by reducing its budget and licensing fee. Asked whether she had considered giving the season a shorter episode order, Dungey noted that every season of the series had been 22 episodes long, and she felt its prior success in delayed viewership and overseas justified continuing that. She added that the "show has continued to grow creatively every season. I feel like last season [was] its strongest creatively yet. I'm very excited for what we have planned for Season 5." It was reported that Disney, the parent company of Marvel Television, ABC Studios, and ABC, had given a mandate to ABC to renew Agents of S.H.I.E.L.D. "despite the desire by some at the network to end the series".

=== Writing ===
In May 2017, ahead of the fifth season renewal, showrunner and executive producer Jed Whedon said the writers were not sure what would happen in the season, and that it would be "by the seat of our pants". The season explores the ramifications of Phil Coulson making a deal with Ghost Rider at the end of the previous season, as well as the groundwork laid by Aida for humans to fear S.H.I.E.L.D. and Inhumans. Whedon stated, "The public perception of S.H.I.E.L.D. is at an all-time low, so we have not resolved that, and there will be still more fallout from it." Moving beyond the Framework reality established at the end of season four, Tancharoen said the emotional impact from the characters' experiences would "be something that resonates throughout the season", especially for Fitz and Mack. When asked if the season would be broken into pods as with season four, executive producer Jeffrey Bell said, "A 22-episode arc is a lot for people to hold onto. By breaking it up into either smaller arcs or different pods, by introducing a set of antagonists and putting them down, or moving from space to space, our experience has been that it's something the viewers enjoy, and it makes it a little easier to digest when you're telling some of these stories." However, Whedon noted that it would depend on how the season would be aired as to where the story is broken up. The season ultimately was broken into two pod story arcs, with each pod having a different emphases, but the whole season having an arc "that will pay off". The writers for the season began work at the end of May 2017.

==== First pod ====
The first pod of the season was informally referred to by the production team as S.H.I.E.L.D. in Space. The original impetus for the season was to give the team a new base to operate out of, which became the Lighthouse. From this, a "cold pitch" idea for the end tag of season four was that Coulson would be in space. After this was pursued for the season, it was realized that "getting to space was such a cool reveal that you didn't have another cool reveal after that", so it was further developed to be Earth in the future. Ahead of the season premiere, executive producer Maurissa Tancharoen said that "every year we reset the series, and this year we definitely knew that it would be the most giant reset to date [with the characters going to space]. Just creatively across the board for everyone, art direction, all of it, our sets, you'll see an overhaul." On the move to space, Whedon commented, "Last year was about tearing everybody apart. We spent a lot of time doing that ... So our goal this year was... putting [this] family together in an intense situation [that] will end up causing drama internally, inevitably... we've spent this many years with them, let's throw them on the craziest roller coaster adventure we could think of." The writers were having trouble keeping track of the events in the season until a diagram was created for the time loop. The main characters eventually return home to their time period.

==== Second pod ====
The second pod of the season includes the series' 100th episode, which Whedon and Tancharoen described as a "game changer" that would "shake up" the rest of the pod emotionally, to the point that "nothing will be the same after" it. Bell added the episode featured "a device that grows out of our current storyline and plot that allows us to look back and reflect on where we've come from, turn over a couple cards that people will be excited about and then also celebrate the show and people on it". Loeb also felt the episode "finishes up some stories that perhaps [viewers] didn't even know we haven't revealed". The episode featured Fitz and Simmons getting married, which Tancharoen said was included because "it was about damn time. After 100 episodes, they needed to get married." Coulson's deal with Ghost Rider was also revealed, which was to have the Kree serum that revived him after his death be burned off, resulting in his chest wound slowly killing him. Whedon said that Coulson has "come to terms with it. It's something he actually had to come to terms with a long time ago when he was discovering the T.A.H.I.T.I. Project and everything that had been done to him. I don't think he wants to go through any of that again. He's ready for nature to take its course... he seems as much at peace with it as you can be considering there's so much he's done in a world that thinks he's dead."

At the end of February 2018, the writers were planning the end of the pod, and were planning for the final episode to be able to serve as both a season and series finale, with some elements that could be adjusted based on whether the series was renewed for a sixth season or not. Whedon added, "we're ready for if this is the end. We're definitely going to make it rewarding either way." The season ends with the agents having to make a choice between Coulson's life or saving the world, which was "where we were always going" when the showrunners were plotting out the season. By killing Fitz in "The End", but revealing there was another still in space journeying to the future, Bell noted it helped solve "the one time loop problem we had". Whedon explained when deciding when to bring the characters back to the present, it was discussed to have them return to the diner where they were taken, but Fitz would still be there, so the group was brought back after Fitz left to avoid that problem, which "became this great opportunity. What we realized is the thing that would weirdly have the most impact, one of the most painful things that you can experience, could be then experienced and then, not brought back, but a loophole could be revealed."

The showrunners spoke to not including a bonus scene at the end of "The End" to tease what would come, Tancharoen said, "We felt like it needed to end in Tahiti. To take away from that would be wrong." Bell added, "It's also, emotionally, about the two senior members of the team, who in a sense have retired to Tahiti, and there they are watching the future of S.H.I.E.L.D. fly off into a new adventure... It felt like a nice, succinct ending." Coulson's journey was always meant to end at Tahiti, something the showrunners revealed was decided since the start of the series. Whedon explained, "We thought it was a beautiful image... It's one of the things where you don't overthink it. We latched onto that and went, 'That will be great.' It's an emotional thing for him. We even heard from Mike Peterson that this was something he always wanted. Our big mystery in episode 1 was, 'Never been to Tahiti.' He doesn't know, and he can never know. And here he is, finding some sort of peace on that beach. We love that image and we were solid on it all the way."

=== Casting ===
Main cast members Clark Gregg, Ming-Na Wen, Chloe Bennet, Iain De Caestecker, Elizabeth Henstridge, and Henry Simmons return from previous seasons as Phil Coulson, Melinda May, Daisy Johnson / Quake, Leo Fitz, Jemma Simmons, and Alphonso "Mack" Mackenzie, respectively. Before the 2017 New York Comic Con, it was revealed that Natalia Cordova-Buckley had been promoted to series regular for the season, after recurring in the past two seasons as Elena "Yo-Yo" Rodriguez. De Caestecker also portrays "The Doctor", the version of Fitz from the Framework reality.

In September 2017, former series regular Nick Blood was announced as returning to reprise his role of Lance Hunter. Blood left the series during the third season, to star in the spin-off series Marvel's Most Wanted, which never came to fruition. Adrianne Palicki, who portrayed Bobbi Morse and also left in the third season for Most Wanted with Blood, expressed interest in October 2017 in returning to guest star in the season, saying she "would absolutely come back" if asked. Also returning from earlier in the series are Joel Stoffer as Enoch, who was simply credited as "silhouetted man" in his previous appearance, and Lola Glaudini as Polly Hinton. Polly's daughter Robin Hinton also appears, portrayed by multiple actresses, after the character made an uncredited appearance in "Ascension": Lexy Kolker appears as 7-year-old Robin, Ava Kolker appears as 12-year-old Robin, and Willow Hale appears as an older Robin, when she is also known as The Seer.

Adrian Pasdar reprises his role as Glenn Talbot, while also becoming the villain Graviton in the season. This is despite the series introducing Franklin Hall (portrayed by Ian Hart) in the first season, who goes on to become the villain in the comics. Additional returning actors include Brian Patrick Wade as Carl Creel, J. August Richards as Mike Peterson / Deathlok, Spencer Treat Clark as Werner von Strucker, Zach McGowan as Anton Ivanov / The Superior, Reed Diamond as Daniel Whitehall, and Raquel Gardner as Carla Talbot, along with Briana Venskus and Maximilian Osinski as S.H.I.E.L.D. agents Piper and Davis. Ruth Negga and David Conrad reprise their roles as Raina and Ian Quinn, respectively, in a flashback sequence set during the events of the season one finale, "Beginning of the End". The characters Lash and Hive return from earlier seasons for the series' 100th episode. Younger versions of Jasper Sitwell and Wolfgang von Strucker also appear, portrayed by Adam Faison and Joey Defore, respectively. Older versions of the characters had been respectively portrayed by Maximiliano Hernández (in the MCU films and first season of the series) and Thomas Kretschmann (in the MCU films).

Jeff Ward was cast in a recurring role in August 2017, and was revealed in October to be portraying Deke Shaw. Ward had originally been cast as Virgil, a character who dies in the first episode. During the table read of the episode, the main cast felt Ward "nailed it" as Virgil and wanted him to stay on as Deke, who had not yet been cast. The producers reached out to Ward after the reading to audition for Deke, and was ultimately cast in the part. Also in October, other newcomers were revealed, with Eve Harlow as Tess, Coy Stewart as Flint, and Pruitt Taylor Vince as Grill. The next month, Marvel revealed that Dove Cameron had joined the season in an unspecified role, which was revealed in January 2018 to be the character Ruby, the daughter of Catherine Dent's General Hale. Other recurring guests for the season include Dominic Rains as Kasius, Florence Faivre as Sinara, Jay Hunter as a Kree watch commander, Tunisha Hubbard as Ava, Shontae Saldana as Candice Lee, and Peter Mensah as Qovas.

=== Design ===
After leaving the series during the fourth season, costume designer Ann Foley returned for the first two episodes of the fifth season, before handing over to Whitney Galitz, who had assisted her on the previous few seasons, and Christann Chanell. The opening for "Orientation" is reminiscent of the sequence for "4,722 Hours", forgoing the title card and having the typeface silently fading onto the screen. The subsequent episodes of the season feature a title card with the series name in a new typeface against a backdrop of various depictions of Earth: episodes through "Past Life" feature a destroyed future Earth; episodes from "Principia" through "The Devil Complex" feature a present Earth; while episodes from "Rise and Shine" through "All Roads Lead..." feature the Earth beginning to crack.

The producers wanted Rodriguez's robot arms to have "a lot of dexterity" and did not want them to "look like robot hands", which "proved to be a lot trickier" for props master Scott Bauer to create. A silicon rubber was used to create a glove for Cordova-Buckley to wear, with 3D-printed plating attached to them, while gauntlets were added to cover the part of the glove that extended to the forearm. The gloves were created by the same company that created the robotic arm for Misty Knight in the second season of Luke Cage. By using the same company, Bauer felt they were able to expand upon the development and "headache" that went into creating Misty Knight's arm, to make a better, more comfortable and durable prop for Rodriguez.

=== Filming ===
Filming for the season began on July 20, 2017. In May 2017, Gregg expressed interest in directing an episode in the season, and confirmed that September he would be directing an episode, which was the sixth of the season, "Fun & Games". Gregg felt the idea of directing was "daunting" as he would need to be doing "five weeks of double duty", needing to act in addition to the various aspects of directing the episode. He reached out to fellow S.H.I.E.L.D. directors Kevin Tancharoen, Billy Gierhart, and Jesse Bochco to get tips on filming for the series. Bennet felt Gregg was able to bring out performances from the cast "that another director probably wouldn't have been able to because he knows the characters so well". Gregg added that he had "shorthand with [the other actors] about what we want to try to do, ways the script could give us a chance to push us into new territory. They all also have deep and interesting ideas that helped me." Gregg also received a deeper appreciation for some of the other departments on the series he normally does not encounter on a regular basis and the work they contribute to each episode. The scene for Fitz and Simmons' wedding in "The Real Deal" was filmed in "a very remote location" in Placerita Canyon State Park. Filming for the season wrapped on April 15, 2018.

=== Music ===
Composer Bear McCreary altered his score this season "into a synth-space-opera-fantasy". The music in the season was inspired by the films Heavy Metal (1981), The Black Hole (1979), Blade Runner (1982), Akira (1988), and The Terminator (1984). Despite the increase of synthesizers, McCreary kept his established symphonic writing and characters themes "as the foundation of the score". He felt the balance he looked to achieve between the synthesizers and classic orchestra was "epitomized" in his score for "The End".

=== Marvel Cinematic Universe tie-ins ===
In terms of having connections to Marvel's Inhumans (2017), Whedon felt it was doubtful, but noted "we also want there to be a bigger reward for people who watch all of [the MCU series], so they'll start to see that there's lines connecting it. It's more fun for people who are playing the whole game, but if you don't, you'll still have a great rollercoaster ride." In November 2017, Whedon said that the season would not have moved the characters to space if the recent MCU films like Guardians of the Galaxy Vol. 2 and Thor: Ragnarok (both 2017) had not been exploring that part of the MCU, but that this would remain a "thematic tie". He explained that they had moved on from the overt tie-ins with the MCU films that the series utilized in earlier seasons because "we have our own mythology. That started to be much more interesting to us, and hopefully to the audience ... No one wants to come to see our show to see another show." Whedon added in March 2018 that the then-upcoming release of Avengers: Infinity War (2018) would similarly "open a new playground" for the series to explore.

The season features the Kree, an alien race that previously appeared in the first three seasons, and in the film Guardians of the Galaxy (2014). The fictional element gravitonium also returns, having first appeared in the first season. It is revealed that the consciousnesses of Franklin Hall and Ian Quinn had been absorbed by the element, eventually merging with Talbot when he enters the Rebirth chamber and becomes Graviton. The last four episodes of the season are set during the events of Infinity War, taking place over a single day and making references to the film; Whedon stated that there was an "unspoken Marvel rule not to address time" but that they considered the events of the series and film to roughly line up. In the episodes, the threat of Thanos becomes the driving force of Talbot's character arc as he plans to join the Avengers in defending the Earth. Bell also spoke to not directly referencing the end of Infinity War in "The End", by not showing any of the characters killed as a result of Thanos' finger snap. He said "Part of what happened was, they changed the release date... we move at a different schedule than they do and so suddenly everything was a week earlier, and so we had to make some adjustments and that's how we end up with our story." Whedon continued, "the other thing is that there's certain story points that are so – there would really be no way for us to address it and keep our show intact. Given that there's another movie coming out, and there's gonna be constant repercussions of their universe, so what we felt was that the safe play for our story, and for the integrity of our universe, was to operate outside of it." Whedon also added, "one of the things that we tried to do was even if we're just hinting at a crossover, our concept was to create motivation for our villain, for our antagonist – using the events of Infinity War and using the larger MCU battle to sort of inform [Talbot's] motivation to become what he's becoming. That was our main tie-in, trying to drive our own antagonist. We felt like that was a good way to deal with it, but keep the things in our world in our story."

== Marketing ==
The main cast of the season appeared at New York Comic Con on October 7, 2017, where they promoted the season and debuted the first 20 minutes of the first episode of the season. A shortened version of the footage was released by ABC and Marvel on November 26, 2017, as a sneak peek before the season premiere later that week. Marvel released three roundtable discussions in support of the series reaching 100 episodes. Hosted by Patton Oswalt, who has portrayed The Koenigs in the series, the first was released on March 8, 2018, with the women of the series. The second, which was released on March 9, featured the full cast, while the third debuted on March 12 with the executive producers. All premiered on Marvel.com while also being available on Marvel and the series' social media platforms and Marvel's YouTube channel. The executive producers, main cast members except Gregg, and Ward appeared at WonderCon on March 24, 2018, to promote the remainder of the season and answer fan questions. A clip from the end of "Rise and Shine" was also shown.

=== "The Road to 100" ===
In December 2017, Marvel announced the "Marvel's Agents of S.H.I.E.L.D.: The Road to 100" art program to commemorate the series reaching 100 episodes. The program features five posters, one for each season of the series, representing "key pivotal moments of each season". The art also appeared as variant covers to select titles published by Marvel Comics in March 2018. Megan Thomas Bradner, Vice President of Development and Production, Live Action at Marvel Television, called reaching 100 episodes "quite a feat... and it felt special enough to share with the fans that got us here. By working with some of our favorite comic artists, we felt we could show a large variety of meaningful moments and the characters that helped get us to a 100." She added that the program "commemorates these creators, the actors, the characters and a hundred amazing stories".

The first poster, highlighting season one, was created by Dale Keown. It features four panels, showcasing the moment Coulson and Grant Ward approached Skye in her van from the pilot, Coulson learning he survived the Battle of New York from the T.A.H.I.T.I. program and a drug from a half-dissected Kree alien corpse, the moment Grant Ward revealed he was a Hydra agent by killing Victoria Hand, and Fitz giving Simmons the last remaining oxygen tank and declaring his love for her in the season one finale. The second poster, highlighting season two, was created by Daniel Acuña. The scenes depicted are Coulson writing the Inhuman map on a wall; Daisy coming out of her Terrigenesis; the S.H.I.E.L.D. team, Bobbi Morse, Lance Hunter, and the "real S.H.I.E.L.D." logo; and May cradling the deceased body of Katya Belyakov. The third poster, highlighting season three, was created by Nick Bradshaw. The poster shows the S.H.I.E.L.D. team and Hive, along with the Hydra logo breaking the S.H.I.E.L.D. logo and its tentacles covering much of the poster. Specific moments highlighted include Fitz and Simmons after she has been pulled from the portal to Maveth, Coulson killing Ward on Maveth, and the formation of the Secret Warriors. The fourth poster, highlighting season four, was created by Rahzzah. It highlighted the introduction of Ghost Rider, Life Model Decoys (LMD) and the Framework reality, Jeffrey Mace sacrificing himself in the Framework, and Coulson's kiss with the May LMD. The fifth and final poster, highlighting this season, was created by Stonehouse. Flanked on either side are Kasius and Sinara, with the S.H.I.E.L.D. team and Deke in the center in front of the destroyed Earth of the future as well as Fitz reuniting with Simmons.

== Release ==
=== Broadcast ===
The season began airing in the United States on ABC on December 1, 2017, beginning once Inhumans finished airing its episodes. It is set to run for 22 episodes, with a short hiatus for the airing of the 2018 Winter Olympics between "Past Life" and "All the Comforts of Home". The season concluded on May 18, 2018.

The fifth season moved to a Friday timeslot, alongside the seventh season of ABC's Once Upon a Time, with ABC chief Channing Dungey explaining, "We've turned Friday into more of a destination for our fantasy and science fiction fans. Once Upon a Time and S.H.I.E.L.D. are airing on the same night for the first time, which is giving many fans of both shows what they've been asking for for a long time." Andy Kubitz, executive vice president for program planning and scheduling at ABC, added that ABC had "confidence that [the S.H.I.E.L.D.] core audience... [would] travel with it" to its new Friday time slot. He continued, "The great thing about Friday night for these shows is it gives three days of downtime for a lot of these younger viewers to be able to catch up on it. You've got Saturday and Sunday viewing that will be able to be counted into our C3 to help us monetize it."

=== Home media ===
The season began streaming on Netflix in the United States on June 17, 2018, and was available until February 28, 2022. It became available on Disney+ in the United States on March 16, 2022, joining other territories where it was already available on the service.

== Reception ==
=== Ratings ===
Viewership and ratings per episode of Agents of S.H.I.E.L.D. season 5
| No. | Title | Air date | Rating/share (18–49) | Viewers (millions) | DVR (18–49) | DVR viewers (millions) | Total (18–49) | Total viewers (millions) |
|---|---|---|---|---|---|---|---|---|
| 1–2 | "Orientation" | December 1, 2017 | 0.7/3 | 2.54 | 0.6 | 1.72 | 1.3 | 4.27 |
| 3 | "A Life Spent" | December 8, 2017 | 0.5/2 | 1.93 | 0.7 | 1.68 | 1.2 | 3.61 |
| 4 | "A Life Earned" | December 15, 2017 | 0.5/2 | 1.84 | —N/a | —N/a | —N/a | —N/a |
| 5 | "Rewind" | December 22, 2017 | 0.6/3 | 2.40 | —N/a | —N/a | —N/a | —N/a |
| 6 | "Fun & Games" | January 5, 2018 | 0.7/3 | 2.49 | 0.7 | —N/a | 1.4 | —N/a |
| 7 | "Together or Not at All" | January 12, 2018 | 0.6/3 | 2.31 | 0.7 | 1.75 | 1.3 | 4.07 |
| 8 | "The Last Day" | January 19, 2018 | 0.6/3 | 2.41 | 0.8 | 1.82 | 1.4 | 4.23 |
| 9 | "Best Laid Plans" | January 26, 2018 | 0.6/3 | 2.27 | 0.6 | 1.72 | 1.2 | 4.00 |
| 10 | "Past Life" | February 2, 2018 | 0.6/3 | 2.22 | 0.6 | 1.74 | 1.2 | 3.96 |
| 11 | "All the Comforts of Home" | March 2, 2018 | 0.5/2 | 1.90 | 0.7 | 1.68 | 1.2 | 3.58 |
| 12 | "The Real Deal" | March 9, 2018 | 0.5/2 | 2.04 | 0.7 | 1.72 | 1.2 | 3.78 |
| 13 | "Principia" | March 16, 2018 | 0.5/2 | 2.07 | 0.6 | 1.58 | 1.1 | 3.65 |
| 14 | "The Devil Complex" | March 23, 2018 | 0.5/2 | 2.07 | 0.7 | 1.63 | 1.2 | 3.70 |
| 15 | "Rise and Shine" | March 30, 2018 | 0.5/2 | 1.88 | 0.6 | 1.61 | 1.1 | 3.49 |
| 16 | "Inside Voices" | April 6, 2018 | 0.6/3 | 2.08 | 0.6 | 1.59 | 1.2 | 3.67 |
| 17 | "The Honeymoon" | April 13, 2018 | 0.5/2 | 1.82 | 0.4 | 1.29 | 0.9 | 3.10 |
| 18 | "All Roads Lead..." | April 20, 2018 | 0.4/2 | 1.67 | 0.6 | 1.49 | 1.0 | 3.16 |
| 19 | "Option Two" | April 27, 2018 | 0.4/2 | 1.68 | 0.6 | 1.49 | 1.0 | 3.17 |
| 20 | "The One Who Will Save Us All" | May 4, 2018 | 0.4/2 | 1.65 | 0.6 | 1.47 | 1.0 | 3.12 |
| 21 | "The Force of Gravity" | May 11, 2018 | 0.5/2 | 1.94 | 0.6 | 1.49 | 1.1 | 3.43 |
| 22 | "The End" | May 18, 2018 | 0.5/2 | 1.88 | 0.6 | 1.46 | 1.1 | 3.34 |

The season averaged 3.57 million total viewers, including from DVR, ranking 133rd among network series in the 2017–18 television season. It also had an average total 18-49 rating of 1.1, which was 97th.

=== Critical response ===
The review aggregator website Rotten Tomatoes reports a 100% approval rating, with an average score of 7.9/10, based on 23 reviews. The website's consensus reads, "Agents of S.H.I.E.L.D. swings for the fences with large-scale storytelling and wild twists that elevate season 5 from the saturated MCU and into its own space."

Reviewing the premiere episodes, Merrill Barr of Forbes felt moving the series to space was not a reboot of the series, rather "a continuation, in some form, of the story set-up at the end of last season. The show is not different. The team is still trying to save the world. They're just doing it in a new place and new way. Overall, there's a lot to love about what S.H.I.E.L.D. is doing in the new season. It's a crazy ride fans are going to be glad they've stayed aboard for. The "Agents of Hydra" run [at the end of season four] was a bit weak. The space run is so far proving to be anything but." Alex McLevy of The A.V. Club praised the move to space, saying that "if season four was Agents of S.H.I.E.L.D. firing on all cylinders, especially during its stellar 'Agents of Hydra' arc in the Framework, then this is the look of a show that knows it has mastered its storytelling, and is confidently expanding the scope of its ambition".

=== Accolades ===
| Year | Award | Category | Nominee(s) | Result | Ref. |
|---|---|---|---|---|---|
| 2018 | Hollywood Post Alliance Awards | Outstanding Visual Effects – Television (Over 13 Episodes) | Mark Kolpack, Sabrina Arnold, Kevin Yuille, David Rey, and Hnedel Maximore (for "Orientation: Part 1") | Won | |
| 2018 | Teen Choice Awards | Choice Action TV Show | Agents of S.H.I.E.L.D. | Nominated | |
| 2018 | Teen Choice Awards | Choice Action TV Actress | Chloe Bennet | Nominated | |
| 2018 | Visual Effects Society Awards | Outstanding Visual Effects in a Photoreal Episode | Mark Kolpack, Sabrina Arnold, David Rey, Kevin Yuille, Gary D'Amico for "Orientation, Part 1" | Nominated | |
| 2018 | Saturn Awards | Best Superhero Television Series | Agents of S.H.I.E.L.D. | Nominated | |

The season was recognized with The ReFrame Stamp for hiring people of underrepresented gender identities, and of color.
