= Jeff Ward (actor) =

American actor (born 1986)

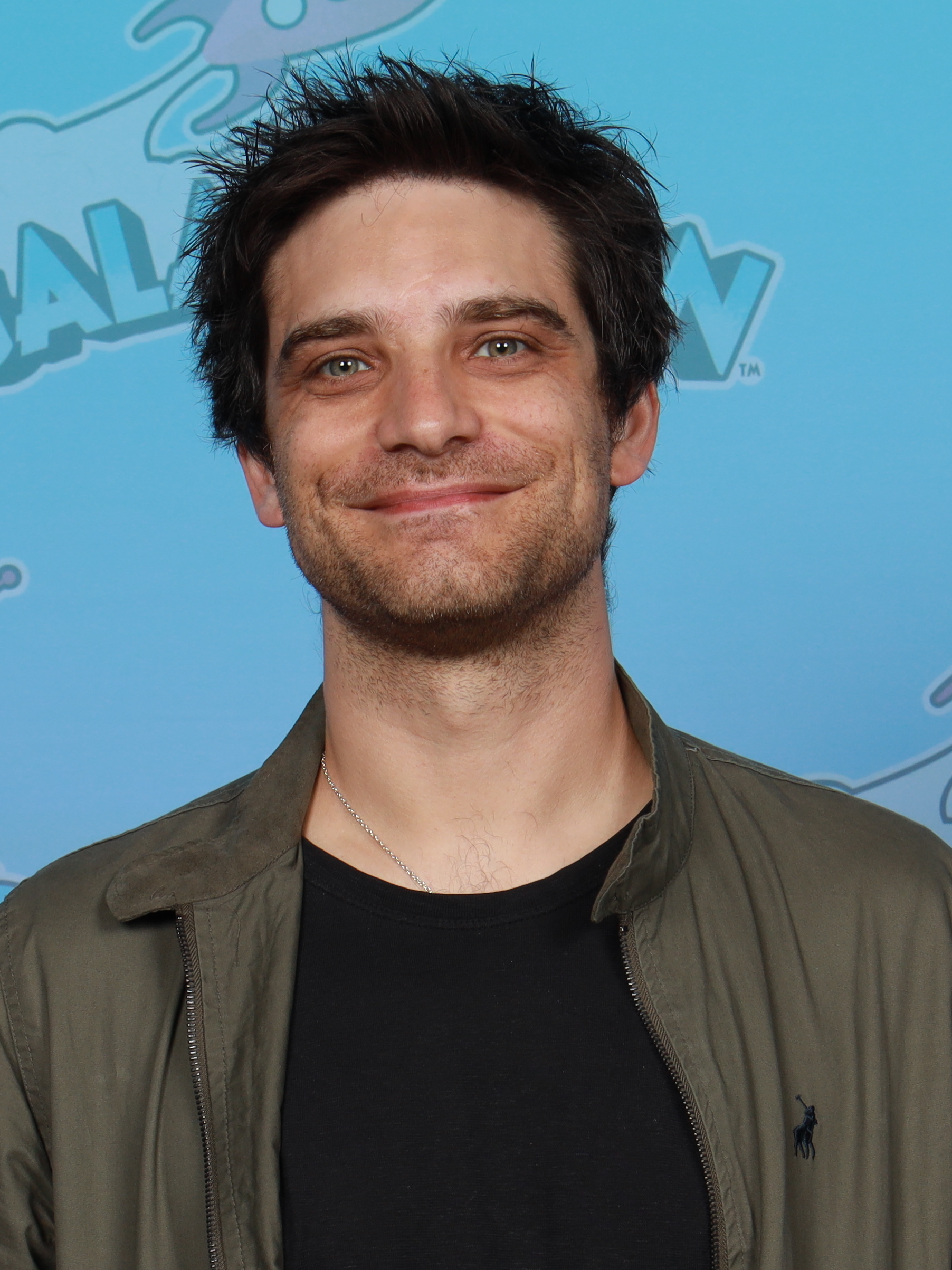
- Ward at GalaxyCon San Jose in 2024
- Born: December 30, 1986 (age 39); Washington, D.C., U.S.
- Occupations: Actor, director
- Years active: 2005–present

Jeff Ward (born December 30, 1986) is an American actor and director. He is best known for his role as Deke Shaw in Agents of S.H.I.E.L.D. (2017–2020) and Buggy the Clown in One Piece (2023–present). He also played Roy Hardaway in the Netflix miniseries Brand New Cherry Flavor (2021) and Seth Marlowe in Channel Zero: No-End House (2017).

== Early life and education ==
Ward was born in Washington, D.C., and grew up in Radnor, Pennsylvania, a suburb of Philadelphia, where he began acting in theatrical productions. He has one younger sister who is a third grade teacher. Ward attended Tisch School of the Arts along with fellow actor Miles Teller. He is also an alumnus of Stella Adler School for Acting.

== Career ==
Ward received recognition after he was cast as Charles Manson in the 2016 TV movie Manson's Lost Girls, a role he accepted because he felt that "people inherently have a slightly dark side."

In 2017, he starred as Seth Marlowe in the critically acclaimed horror anthology series Channel Zero: No-End House.

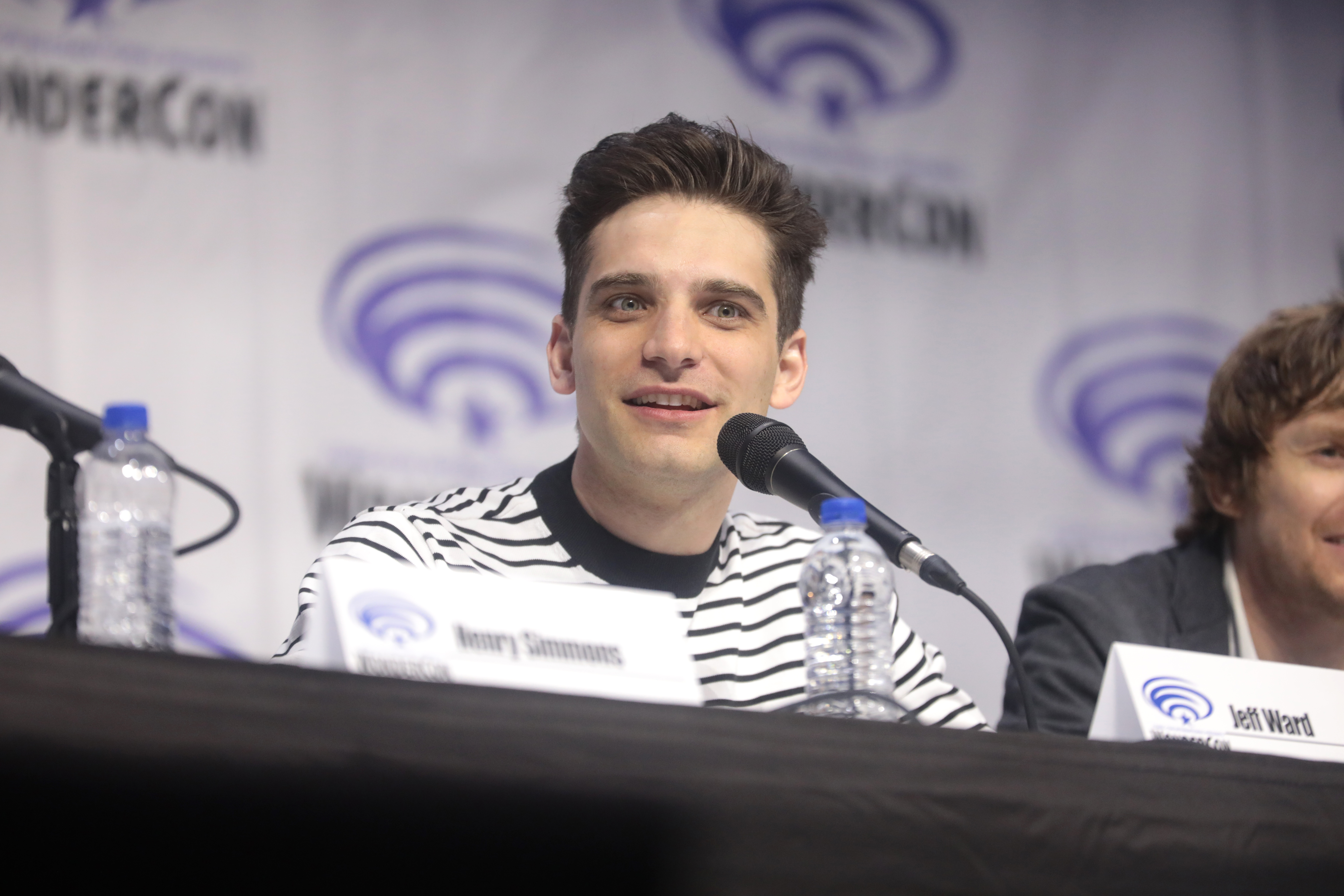
Ward at the 2019 WonderCon

Later in 2017, he was cast as Deke Shaw on the Marvel Cinematic Universe television series Agents of S.H.I.E.L.D. in a recurring role during season five. Originally he was cast as Virgil, a minor character who dies in the first episode of the season, but during the table read of the episode, the main cast felt that Ward "nailed it" as Virgil and wanted him to stay on as Deke, who had not yet been cast. After the reading, the producers reached out to Ward and offered him to audition for Deke, which ended in him ultimately being cast in the part. Ward was promoted to series regular for season six, and returned in that capacity for the seventh and final season.

In November 2019, it was announced that Ward would appear in a main role on the Netflix horror drama miniseries Brand New Cherry Flavor. The miniseries was released on August 13, 2021.In September 2022, Ward was cast in the role of Buggy the Clown in the Netflix series One Piece, based on the manga of the same name.

In 2023, he made his debut as a director with an Off-Broadway production of John Patrick Shanley's Danny and the Deep Blue Sea at the Lucille Lortel Theatre. The production starred Aubrey Plaza and Christopher Abbott, with Ward himself stepping in for Abbott as an understudy.

In 2026, Ward will be making his film directorial debut with the romantic crime thriller Strangers, which he will both direct and star in opposite Frankie Shaw.

== Filmography ==
=== Film ===
Year	Title	Role	Notes
2012	Vamperifica	Peter	
2015	The Girlfriend Game	Ben	Short film; also producer
2017	The Boy Downstairs	Marcus	
2017	Take Me Out with the Stars	Max	Short film
2018	Imaginary Circumstances	Max	Short film
2019	Plus One	Trevor	
TBA	The Descendant	Adam	Post-production
TBA	Strangers	TBA	Also director

=== Television ===
Year	Title	Role	Notes
2005	Law & Order: Criminal Intent	Darwin Mondale	Episode: "In the Wee Small Hours: Part 1"
2011	Body of Proof	Patrick Spradlin	2 episodes
2011	Heavenly	Jared	Unsold pilot
2012	The Beauty Inside	Handsome Alex	2 episodes
2012	Beautiful People	Paul	Unsold pilot
2012	Holly's Holiday	Milo Ames	TV movie
2013	Project Reality	Unknown	Miniseries
2014	Next Time on Lonny	Giles	Episode: "Lonny Goes for Broke"
2014	Open Season	Jonah	Episode: "The Night Out"
2015	The Mentalist	Matthew Stoppard	Episode: "The Whites of His Eyes"
2016	Manson's Lost Girls	Charles Manson	TV movie
2016	Rosewood	Wyatt Montgomery	Episode: "Hydrocephalus and Hard Knocks"
2016	That's What She Said	Unknown	Miniseries
2017	555	Actor	Episode: "Acting"
2017	Channel Zero: No-End House	Seth Marlowe	Main role; 6 episodes
2017–2020	Agents of S.H.I.E.L.D.	Deke Shaw	Recurring role (season 5); Main role (seasons 6–7); 45 episodes
2019–2021	Pen15	Rick	Episode: "Runaway"
2020	Cake	Himself	Episode: "Auditions: The Guy Before"
2021	Hacks	George	2 episodes
2021	Brand New Cherry Flavor	Roy Hardaway	8 episodes
2023–present	One Piece	Buggy the Clown	Main role (season 1); Guest role (season 2); 7 episodes
