= Beginning of the End (Agents of S.H.I.E.L.D.) =

- Agents of S.H.I.E.L.D. episode
- "The Art of Level Seven" poster for the episode
- Episode no.: Season 1 Episode 22
- Directed by: David Straiton
- Written by: Maurissa Tancharoen; Jed Whedon
- Cinematography by: Feliks Parnell
- Editing by: David Crabtree
- Original air date: May 13, 2014
- Running time: 41 minutes

Guest appearances
- Bill Paxton as John Garrett; J. August Richards as Mike Peterson / Deathlok; B. J. Britt as Antoine Triplett; Ruth Negga as Raina; David Conrad as Ian Quinn; Glenn Morshower as Jacobs; Josh Daugherty as Kyle Zeller; Samuel L. Jackson as Nick Fury

Episode chronology
← Previous "Ragtag"	Next → "Shadows"
- Agents of S.H.I.E.L.D. season 1

"Beginning of the End" is the twenty-second episode and season finale of the first season of the American television series Agents of S.H.I.E.L.D. Based on the Marvel Comics organization S.H.I.E.L.D., it follows Phil Coulson and his team of S.H.I.E.L.D. agents as they attack a major Hydra base. It is set in the Marvel Cinematic Universe (MCU) and acknowledges the franchise's films. The episode was written by Maurissa Tancharoen and Jed Whedon, and directed by David Straiton.

Clark Gregg reprises his role as Coulson from the film series, and is joined by series regulars Ming-Na Wen, Brett Dalton, Chloe Bennet, Iain De Caestecker, and Elizabeth Henstridge.

"Beginning of the End" originally aired on ABC on May 13, 2014, and according to Nielsen Media Research, was watched by 5.45 million viewers.

== Plot ==
Following the events of "Ragtag", Coulson, Melinda May, Skye and Antoine Triplett are attacked by several Centipede soldiers (controlled from Cybertek) and a Hydra operative wielding the Berserker staff in a Cuban Hydra base. After Skye activates her Trojan virus within Hydra's computer systems so the team can uncover their plans, May uses the staff to collapse the base and bury the Hydra agents.

Trapped on the ocean floor, Leo Fitz and Jemma Simmons send out a distress signal, and devise a controlled explosive to blow the windows open and escape. Fitz forces a distraught Simmons to take the sole oxygen tank, professing his feelings for her. He is nearly drowned after using the explosive, while Simmons swims to the surface with his unconscious body, where they are rescued by Nick Fury, who picked up their distress signal. Fitz survives, but sustains damage to his temporal lobe as a result of oxygen deprivation and is left comatose.

After being saved from death by Raina's synthesized GH325, John Garrett begins exhibiting the super-strength given by the Centipede serum, as well as the manic behavior and hypergraphia caused by GH325, and the symbols he carves resemble those found in an earlier mission by Grant Ward in the Todorov Building in Minsk. (Note: As depicted in "Eye Spy.") Coulson, May, Skye and Triplett use the Trojan to locate the new Cybertek facility, and launch an assault while Ian Quinn is giving some military generals a tour. Hearing the gunfire, the generals demand to know the situation, and an annoyed Garrett murders one of them. A panicked Quinn flees with the gravitonium, along with Raina.

Ward tries to capture Skye, but is attacked and incapacitated by May, while Skye releases prisoners Hydra took to coerce the Cybertek staff and Centipede soldiers into doing their bidding, including Ace Peterson. Fury arrives and provides Coulson with the Destroyer gun, which he uses to take out the remaining Centipede soldiers, before they confront Garrett and Mike Peterson. Skye sends Peterson a message from Ace through his eye implant ("Dad, what are we? We're a team"), and Peterson, realizing Ace is safe, fires a missile at Garrett and then kills him with his cybernetic leg.

In the aftermath, the Centipede soldiers are arrested by the military, Coulson takes Ward captive, and Peterson, unable to face his son, leaves to seek redemption for his crimes. The GH325 in Garrett's blood revives him, and he uses Cybertek machinery to upgrade into an advanced Deathlok, but Coulson vaporizes him with the Peruvian Tesseract weapon. Coulson criticizes Fury for using GH325 to revive him, but Fury asserts that he values Coulson as much as any Avenger, because he represents the heart and moral center of S.H.I.E.L.D. He then declares Coulson the new director of S.H.I.E.L.D., tasking him with rebuilding the organization from scratch, and equips him with a "toolbox" containing useful data. Under cover of his apparent death, Fury heads to eastern Europe to continue hunting Hydra, while Coulson, May, Skye and Triplett use co-ordinates in the toolbox to locate another secret base, the Playground, where they reunite with Simmons and meet Billy Koenig, identical brother of the deceased Eric. Elsewhere, Raina meets with Skye's father, "the Doctor".

In an end tag, Coulson begins experiencing hypergraphic episodes as a belated side effect of the GH325.

== Production ==
=== Development and writing ===
In April 2014, Marvel revealed that the twenty-second episode would be titled "Beginning of the End", and would be written by executive producers Maurissa Tancharoen and Jed Whedon, with David Straiton directing. Whedon said they wanted to give the season "a happy ending in a way" with Tancharoen adding the series was "a little bit back to square one" and "boiled down to the basics". Whedon continued saying, though teases were given for Raina, Skye, and Phil Coulson, "we wanted to feel their victory" in the episode.

=== Casting ===
In April 2014, Marvel revealed that main cast members Clark Gregg, Ming-Na Wen, Brett Dalton, Chloe Bennet, Iain De Caestecker, and Elizabeth Henstridge would star as Phil Coulson, Melinda May, Grant Ward, Skye, Leo Fitz, and Jemma Simmons, respectively. It was also revealed that the guest cast for the episode would include Bill Paxton as Agent John Garrett, J. August Richards as Mike Peterson / Deathlok, B. J. Britt as Agent Antoine Triplett, Ruth Negga as Raina, David Conrad as Ian Quinn, Glenn Morshower as General Jacobs, Josh Daugherty as Kyle Zeller, Patton Oswalt as Billy Koenig, Mark Berry as Admiral Jolnes, Jeffrey Muller as Kaminsky, Ajani Wrighster as Ace Peterson, Asif Ali as Jesse Fletcher, Kyla Garcia as Mrs. Zeller, Nicole J. Butler as Aunt Mindy and Cynthia Rose Hall as employee. Oswalt, Berry, Muller, Wrighster, Ali, Garcia, Butler, and Hall did not receive guest star credit in the episode. Paxton, Richards, Britt, Negga, Conrad, and Morshower reprise their roles from earlier in the series. Samuel L. Jackson makes a special guest appearance as Nick Fury, reprising his role from the films.

=== Filming ===
Filming occurred from March 23 to April 9, 2014.

=== Marvel Cinematic Universe tie-ins ===
In his appearance, Jackson's Fury wields a version of the gun that Coulson used in Marvel's The Avengers.

== Release ==
=== Broadcast ===
"Beginning of the End" was first aired in the United States on ABC on May 13, 2014.

=== Marketing ===
For the final six episodes, Marvel began the "Marvel's Agents of S.H.I.E.L.D.: The Art of Level Seven" initiative, in which a different image was released each Thursday before a new episode, depicting a first look at a key event from the upcoming episode. Bell stated that the initiative was a way to tie the series back to its comics roots, and was thought of at the beginning of the season. The production team tried to pair specific artists to the teaser posters based on their previous work and how it connected to the themes and emotion of the intended episode. The poster for "Beginning of the End", created by Phantom City Creative, is reminiscent of the first official poster released, with differences including the characters' order and clothing, the poster's coloring, a broken S.H.I.E.L.D. logo over Hydra's, and Ward being tinted by Hydra. Phantom City Creative director Justine Erickson said, "It made sense to bookend the series with a poster that on one hand called back to where they began, but more importantly showed how far they've come as a team." May and Skye are positioned closest to Coulson in the poster because they are now both the closest emotionally to him, while Ward's positioning needed to show how he went "from the most trusted of colleagues to betrayer and villain".

=== Home media ===
The episode, along with the rest of Agents of S.H.I.E.L.D.'s first season, was released on Blu-ray and DVD on September 9, 2014. Bonus features include behind-the-scenes featurettes, audio commentary, deleted scenes, and a blooper reel. On November 20, 2014, the episode became available for streaming on Netflix. The episode, along with the rest of the series, was removed from Netflix on February 28, 2022, and later became available on Disney+ on March 16, 2022.

== Reception ==
=== Ratings ===
In the United States the episode received a 2.0/7 percent share among adults between the ages of 18 and 49, meaning that it was seen by 2.0 percent of all households, and 7 percent of all of those watching television at the time of the broadcast. It was watched by 5.45 million viewers.
