= Jesse Bochco =

American television director and producer

- Born: Jesse John Bochco; March 2, 1975 (age 50); Los Angeles, California, U.S.
- Occupation(s): Television director and producer
- Years active: 2001–present
- Spouse: Kate Danson (m. 2009; div. 2015)
- Parents: Steven Bochco (father); Barbara Bosson (mother)
- Relatives: Ted Danson (father-in-law); Joanna Frank (aunt); Alan Rachins (uncle)

Jesse John Bochco (born March 2, 1975) is an American television director and producer. He is the son of television producer/writer Steven Bochco and actress Barbara Bosson.

== Career ==
In 1982, Bochco had his first and only acting role as Frank Furillo Jr. on the series Hill Street Blues, produced by his father. He played the son of Fay Furillo, Barbara Bosson's character.

Bochco began his behind-the-camera career as an associate producer on his father's television series Philly (2001–2002) starring Kim Delaney. He made his directorial debut on that series with the episode "Tall Tales" in 2002. He went on to direct episodes of NYPD Blue, Over There, Commander in Chief and Raising the Bar, all produced by his father. His other television directing credits include Dirt, Lincoln Heights, Standoff, John from Cincinnati, The Closer, Prison Break, Nip/Tuck, Agents of S.H.I.E.L.D., and Dallas.

== Personal life ==
In 2009, Bochco married actress Kate Danson, the daughter of actor Ted Danson and his second wife Cassandra Coates. They divorced in 2015.
