= Joel Stoffer =

American actor

- Born: 21 August 1965 (age 60); Los Angeles, California, U.S.
- Occupations: Film, stage, TV actor, set designer
- Years active: 1992–present

Joel Stoffer (born August 21, 1965) is an American actor. He is known for his role as Enoch on the television show Agents of S.H.I.E.L.D. (2017–2020), and has also appeared in films such as Indiana Jones and the Kingdom of the Crystal Skull (2008) and The One (2001).

== Filmography ==
=== Film ===
Year	Title	Role	Note
1992	Death Ring	Orin, Weasely Thug	
1994	The Production Assistant		Short
1997	Sammy the Screenplay	Script Doctor	Short
1997	Kick of Death	Jason	
2000	A Man Is Mostly Water	Brian	
2001	The One	Dr. Franklin	
2004	Species III	Portus	
2008	Indiana Jones and the Kingdom of the Crystal Skull	Taylor	
2009	The Scenesters	Hume Wonacott	
2011	Donner Pass	Robert	
2011	The Aerial Girl	Carl	Short
2014	Olive Unleashed	Sebastian Klink	Short
2016	#nofilter	Rich	Short
2016	The Last Note	Dream Maker	
2017	Bozonova	Joe Fletcher	Short

=== Television ===
Year	Title	Role	Notes
1996	Diagnosis: Murder	Young Man	Episode: "An Explosive Murder" (4.08)
1997	Moloney	Arthur Willis	Episode: "Misconduct" (1.15)
1997	NYPD Blue	Doug	Episode: "The Truth Is Out There" (5.04)
1998	Brooklyn South	Chuck	Episode: "Doggonit" (1.19)
1998	The Pretender	Jude Dane	Episode: "Bank" (2.20)
1998	The Young and the Restless	Dr. Ken Cromwell	4 episodes
1998	Route 9	Anthony	Television film
1998	Home Improvement	Wally - Contactor #2	Episode: "Ploys for Tots" (8.12)
1999	Sliders	Kromagg Lieutenant	Episode: "Strangers and Comrades" (5.03)
2000	Lessons Learned	Kirk	TV movie
2000	Walker, Texas Ranger	Cody Danner	Episode: "The Day of Cleansing" (8.17)
2000	18 Wheels of Justice	John Willis	Episode: "Ordeal" (1.07)
2000	The Invisible Man	Barry Bennish	Episode: "Liberty and Larceny" (1.07)
2001	Angel	Vampire #1	Episode: "Redefinition" (2.11)
2001	CSI: Crime Scene Investigation	Marty Gable	Episode: "Ellie" (2.10)
2003	The Lyon's Den	Ty Mason	Episode: "Beach House" (1.12)
2004	Cold Case	Aaron Dutra	Episode: "Late Returns" (1.19)
2005	Judging Amy	Dr. Lawrence Kaplow	Episode: "You Don't Know Me" (6.12)
2005	Blind Justice	Rory Glann	Episode: "Doggone" (1.10)
2005	The Shield	Roger Pruitt	Episode: "String Theory" (4.09)
2006	Charmed	Creo	3 episodes
2006	Hollis & Rae	Chip	Television film
2006, 2009	Numbers	Agent Davidson	2 episodes: "Waste Not" (3.09), "Con Job" (6.09)
2007	Prison Break	Old Man Bagwell	Episode: "Bad Blood" (2.17)
2007	Law Dogs	Deputy Ken	Television film
2008	Life	Bartender	Episode: "Badge Bunny" (2.09)
2009	HBO Imagine		TV short
2010	Days of Our Lives	Charlie	3 episodes
2011	Breakout Kings	Wes Herman	Episode: "Out of the Mouths of Babes" (1.04)
2011	Castle	Ron Berger	Episode: "Demons" (4.06)
2012	Dorkumentary	Dan	Episode: "Our First Babysitter" (1.06)
2015	The Reveal	Plaxico	Miniseries
2016	Rosewood	Nick Holmes	Episode: "Spirochete & Santeria" (2.05)
2017–2020	Agents of S.H.I.E.L.D.	Enoch	Guest role (season 4), Recurring role (seasons 5–7), 26 episodes
2022	Stranger Things	Wayne Munson	Recurring role (season 4)

=== Video games ===
Year	Title	Role
1997	Wing Commander: Prophecy	2nd Lt. Jason 'Dallas' Fargo

=== Music videos ===
Year	Title	Artist	Role
2009	"Beyond Here Lies Nothin'"	Bob Dylan	Guy
