= Among Us Hide... =

- Agents of S.H.I.E.L.D. episode
- Episode no.: Season 3 Episode 6
- Directed by: Dwight Little
- Written by: Drew Z. Greenberg
- Cinematography by: Allan Westbrook
- Editing by: Eric Litman
- Original air date: November 3, 2015
- Running time: 43 minutes

Guest appearances
- Powers Boothe as Gideon Malick; Constance Zimmer as Rosalind Price; Andrew Howard as Luther Banks; Matthew Willig as Lash; Spencer Treat Clark as Werner von Strucker; Daz Crawford as Kebo; Hector Hugo as Jerome Deschamps; Blair Underwood as Andrew Garner

Episode chronology
← Previous "4,722 Hours"	Next → "Chaos Theory"
- Agents of S.H.I.E.L.D. season 3

"Among Us Hide..." is the sixth episode of the third season, and fiftieth episode overall, of the American television series Agents of S.H.I.E.L.D. Based on the Marvel Comics organization S.H.I.E.L.D., it follows Phil Coulson and his team of S.H.I.E.L.D. agents as they deal with new players and secrets. It is set in the Marvel Cinematic Universe (MCU) and acknowledges the franchise's films. The episode was written by Drew Z. Greenberg, and directed by Dwight Little.

Clark Gregg reprises his role as Coulson from the film series, and is joined by series regulars Ming-Na Wen, Brett Dalton, Chloe Bennet, Iain De Caestecker, Elizabeth Henstridge, Nick Blood, Adrianne Palicki, Henry Simmons, and Luke Mitchell.

"Among Us Hide..." originally aired on ABC on November 3, 2015, and according to Nielsen Media Research, was watched by 3.84 million viewers.

== Plot ==
After being attacked by Hydra, (Note: As depicted in "Devils You Know".) Andrew Garner is found badly injured and brought to the Playground for treatment. Melinda May takes over the hunt for Grant Ward, and convinces Bobbi Morse to join her. They examine Werner von Strucker's bank transactions and learn he has travelled to the Cayman Islands. Ward orders Kebo to find and kill Strucker, who has sought refuge with his father's friend Gideon Malick, a former World Security Council member and senior Hydra member. Sending Strucker to Portugal, Malick later contacts Ward, offering him an alliance and telling him Strucker's location as a show of faith. May and Morse steal Strucker's safe deposit box, and Leo Fitz traces the fake passports inside, finding further Strucker bank accounts and learning his location.

Meanwhile, Phil Coulson meets with Rosalind Price, who agreed to show him the Advanced Threat Containment Unit (ATCU) facility for their captured Inhumans. There is a break-in at her apartment, and she and Coulson go there to investigate. Coulson suspects Price staged a burglary to divert his attention and gain his sympathy, at which point a hurt Price takes him to the Inhuman facility. Theorising Luther Banks may be Lash, Daisy Johnson, Lance Hunter and Alphonso "Mack" Mackenzie spy on him, and Hunter shoots Banks with an I.C.E.R. so they can collect a blood sample. The DNA analysis proves Banks is not an Inhuman, but after finding a text on his phone regarding a delivery to Endotex Labs, the three agents go there and discover it is the facility where the Inhumans are being held by the ATCU. Daisy is shocked to find the Inhumans are being kept in suspended animation, and is further riled to see Coulson there. Though Coulson has misgivings, Price insists suspended animation is the only way to contain the Inhumans until the ATCU can find a cure to reverse their Terrigenesis. She also admits that her husband died from cancer years earlier, and that she genuinely wants to be allies with Coulson, if not friends.

May and Morse arrive in Portugal to find Kebo torturing Strucker, and while Morse fights Kebo and fatally electrocutes him in a swimming pool, May subdues the other Hydra agents and frees a critically wounded Strucker. Before losing consciousness, he reveals to a horrified May that Andrew Garner is the real Lash, and that he killed his Hydra attackers and then set the explosion in the convenience store to cover his tracks.

In the end tag, Daisy shares a brief phone conversation with Lincoln Campbell, who is still off the grid after the ATCU tried to capture him. (Note: As depicted in "A Wanted (Inhu)man".) Andrew asks her to try to persuade Lincoln to come to the Playground, secretly plotting to kill him.

== Production ==
=== Development ===
In October 2015, Marvel announced that the sixth episode of the season would be titled "Among Us Hide...", to be written by Drew Z. Greenberg, with Dwight Little directing. The title references Fantastic Four #45, which was named "Among Us Hide...The Inhumans" and first introduced the Inhumans in Marvel Comics.

=== Casting ===
In October 2015, Marvel revealed that main cast members Clark Gregg, Ming-Na Wen, Brett Dalton, Chloe Bennet, Iain De Caestecker, Elizabeth Henstridge, Nick Blood, Adrianne Palicki, Henry Simmons, and Luke Mitchell would star as Phil Coulson, Melinda May, Grant Ward, Daisy Johnson, Leo Fitz, Jemma Simmons, Lance Hunter, Bobbi Morse, Alphonso "Mack" Mackenzie, and Lincoln Campbell, respectively. It was also revealed that the guest cast for the episode would include Blair Underwood as Dr. Andrew Garner, Constance Zimmer as Rosalind Price, Matthew Willig as Lash, Daz Crawford as Kebo, Andrew Howard as Luther Banks, Spencer Treat Clark as Werner von Strucker, Powers Boothe as Gideon Malick, Hector Hugo as Jerome Deschamps, Anthony Corrales as S.H.I.E.L.D. agent and Marco Martinez as Officer Stuart. Corrales and Martinez did not receive guest star credit in the episode. Underwood, Zimmer, Willig, Crawford, Howard, and Clark reprise their roles from earlier in the series, while Boothe previously appeared as a then-unnamed Malick in The Avengers.

== Release ==
=== Broadcast ===
"Among Us Hide..." was first aired in the United States on ABC on November 3, 2015.

=== Marketing ===
To celebrate the series reaching 50 episodes, Marvel released a video showing cast and crew members discussing their memories and favorite moments of the series so far.

== Reception ==
=== Ratings ===
In the United States the episode received a 1.4/4 percent share among adults between the ages of 18 and 49, meaning that it was seen by 1.4 percent of all households, and 4 percent of all of those watching television at the time of the broadcast. It was watched by 3.84 million viewers.
