= Devils You Know =

- Agents of S.H.I.E.L.D. episode
- Episode no.: Season 3 Episode 4
- Directed by: Ron Underwood
- Written by: Paul Zbyszewski
- Cinematography by: Allan Westbrook
- Editing by: Joshua Charson
- Original air date: October 20, 2015
- Running time: 43 minutes

Guest appearances
- Constance Zimmer as Rosalind Price; Andrew Howard as Luther Banks; Matthew Willig as Lash; Spencer Treat Clark as Werner von Strucker; Chad Lindberg as Dwight Frye; Blair Underwood as Andrew Garner

Episode chronology
← Previous "A Wanted (Inhu)man"	Next → "4,722 Hours"
- Agents of S.H.I.E.L.D. season 3

"Devils You Know" is the fourth episode of the third season of the American television series Agents of S.H.I.E.L.D. Based on the Marvel Comics organization S.H.I.E.L.D., it follows Phil Coulson and his team of S.H.I.E.L.D. agents as they work with a rival organization to hunt Inhumans. It is set in the Marvel Cinematic Universe (MCU) and acknowledges the franchise's films. The episode was written by Paul Zbyszewski, and directed by Ron Underwood.

Clark Gregg reprises his role as Coulson from the film series, and is joined by series regulars Ming-Na Wen, Brett Dalton, Chloe Bennet, Iain De Caestecker, Elizabeth Henstridge, Nick Blood, Adrianne Palicki, and Henry Simmons. The visual effects for guest star Chad Lindberg's Inhuman character's abilities were provided by FuseFX.

"Devils You Know" originally aired on ABC on October 20, 2015, and according to Nielsen Media Research, was watched by 3.85 million viewers.

== Plot ==
Veteran Inhuman Alisha Whitley tracks down some old friends from Afterlife, Shane and Lori Henson, with the aim to recruit them into the Secret Warriors. Alisha sends a duplicate to Shane and Lori, learning they received an email from someone wanting to reunite the Afterlife Inhumans. The monstrous Inhuman Lash attacks and kills Shane, Lori, and the duplicate, traumatizing the real Alisha. Daisy Johnson and Alphonso "Mack" Mackenzie pursue Lash, while Phil Coulson alerts Rosalind Price, who sends an Advanced Threat Containment Unit (ATCU) team to help, but they are unable to apprehend the Inhuman. Daisy finds a virus in the email sent to the Hensons, and reluctantly share this with the ATCU, who have found dead Inhumans in the past who received the email, but failed to notice the virus. She traces the virus back to IT technician Dwight Frye.

Kebo tells Lance Hunter that Grant Ward wants his help for a planned Hydra attack. Hunter tells Melinda May that as soon as he gets close enough, he will kill Ward. Coulson and Andrew Garner are stunned when May arrives at the Playground to voice her concerns about Hunter, believing he is too personally involved in his mission, fixated on avenging Ward's attempted murder of Bobbi Morse. She agrees to contact Coulson when Hunter knows where he is meeting Ward, so a S.H.I.E.L.D. team can arrive to assist them against Hydra. Andrew apologizes to May for breaking up with her and offers to explain, but she is uninterested, believing herself to be the problem.

Coulson, Daisy, Mack, Price and an ATCU team go to Frye's apartment, discovering he is an Inhuman whose health deteriorates when near to other Inhumans. He explains that he gets better every time Lash claims another victim, and that Lash gave him the names of the Afterlife Inhumans and asked him to track them down. Coulson convinces Price to let Daisy and Mack join the ATCU team taking Frye into custody, so they can see what the organization are doing with the Inhumans they apprehend. En route their truck is attacked by Lash, and Daisy's use of her powers against him flips the truck, injuring her and knocking Mack and the ATCU agents unconscious. Lash kills Frye but spares Daisy, and as he is leaving she sees his shadow change into a more human shape, realizing he is able to transform between human and bestial appearances.

Kebo takes Hunter to a Hydra warehouse, where he promptly tries to kill Ward, leading to a shootout with almost a dozen Hydra agents. May joins the fight, at which point Ward reveals he has sent Hydra agents, including Werner von Strucker, to kill Andrew at a gas station, offering to call them off if May and Hunter surrender. Hunter refuses and chases Ward, managing to shoot him in the shoulder before he escapes with Kebo, and May contacts Coulson to warn him that Andrew is in danger. Meanwhile, Werner flees the gas station as it is destroyed in an explosion.

Leo Fitz finds Jemma Simmons has compiled a file regarding the Monolith, but she initially refuses to explain why. She later relents and tells Fitz of her plans to return to Maveth, wanting his help to rebuild the Monolith, and offers to recount her experience on the planet.

== Production ==
=== Development ===
In October 2015, Marvel announced that the fourth episode of the season would be titled "Devils You Know", to be written by Paul Zbyszewski, with Ron Underwood directing.

=== Casting ===
In October 2015, Marvel revealed that main cast members Clark Gregg, Ming-Na Wen, Brett Dalton, Chloe Bennet, Iain De Caestecker, Elizabeth Henstridge, Nick Blood, Adrianne Palicki, Henry Simmons, and Luke Mitchell would star as Phil Coulson, Melinda May, Grant Ward, Daisy Johnson, Leo Fitz, Jemma Simmons, Lance Hunter, Bobbi Morse, Alphonso "Mack" Mackenzie, and Lincoln Campbell, respectively. It was also revealed that the guest cast for the episode would include Blair Underwood as Andrew Garner, Constance Zimmer as Rosalind Price, Matthew Willig as Lash, Daz Crawford as Kebo, Andrew Howard as Luther Banks, Spencer Treat Clark as Werner von Strucker, Alicia Vela-Bailey as Alisha Whitley, Alexi Wasser as Lori, Nick Eversman as Shane and Chad Lindberg as Dwight Frye. Crawford and Vela-Bailey did not receive guest star credit in the episode. Underwood, Zimmer, Willig, Crawford, Howard, Clark, and Vela-Bailey reprise their roles from earlier in the series. Despite being credited, Mitchell did not ultimately appear.

=== Visual effects ===
The Inhuman character of Dwight Frye "breaks out in a rash" when he nears another Inhuman. Though the rash was created through make-up and prosthetics, the appearance of it on Frye's face was done digitally. Visual effects supervisor Mark Kolpack noted that since the character was killed by the end of the episode it was not cost effective to have actor Lindberg professionally laser scanned; instead an Occipital Structure Sensor attached to Kolpack's iPad Air 2 was used to get a scan of Lindberg's face and make-up, a process that Kolpack admitted was not yet perfect. Kolpack was able to use the scan to get textures and geometry ahead of having lead visual effects vendor FuseFX create the final rash effect.

== Broadcast ==
"Devils You Know" was first aired in the United States on ABC on October 20, 2015.

== Reception ==
=== Ratings ===
In the United States the episode received a 1.5/4 percent share among adults between the ages of 18 and 49, meaning that it was seen by 1.5 percent of all households, and 4 percent of all of those watching television at the time of the broadcast. It was watched by 3.85 million viewers.
