= T.R.A.C.K.S. =

- Agents of S.H.I.E.L.D. episode
- Episode no.: Season 1 Episode 13
- Directed by: Paul Edwards
- Written by: Lauren LeFranc; Rafe Judkins
- Cinematography by: Feliks Parnell
- Editing by: Paul Trejo
- Original air date: February 4, 2014
- Running time: 43 minutes

Guest appearances
- J. August Richards as Mike Peterson / Deathlok; David Conrad as Ian Quinn; Carlo Rota as Luca Russo; Emily Baldoni as Sofia; T. J. Ramini as Carlo Mancini; Stan Lee as himself

Episode chronology
← Previous "Seeds"	Next → "T.A.H.I.T.I."
- Agents of S.H.I.E.L.D. season 1

"T.R.A.C.K.S." is the thirteenth episode of the first season of the American television series Agents of S.H.I.E.L.D. Based on the Marvel Comics organization S.H.I.E.L.D., it follows Phil Coulson and his team of S.H.I.E.L.D. agents as they hunt for rogue businessman Ian Quinn. It is set in the Marvel Cinematic Universe (MCU) and acknowledges the franchise's films. The episode was written by Lauren LeFranc and Rafe Judkins, and directed by Paul Edwards.

Clark Gregg reprises his role as Coulson from the film series, and is joined by series regulars Ming-Na Wen, Brett Dalton, Chloe Bennet, Iain De Caestecker, and Elizabeth Henstridge. David Conrad returns to portray Ian Quinn, while J. August Richards' recurring guest character Mike Peterson is revealed to be an adaptation and incarnation of Deathlok.

"T.R.A.C.K.S." originally aired on ABC on February 4, 2014, and according to Nielsen Media Research, was watched by 6.62 million viewers.

== Plot ==
Ian Quinn makes a purchase from Cybertek Industries, and a security team of mercenaries is hired to escort it to Quinn's mansion in the Italian countryside. Wanting to apprehend Quinn after he recently revealed he is allied with the Clairvoyant, (Note: As revealed in "Seeds".) agent Phil Coulson's team boards the train carrying the merchandise, posing as ordinary passengers. Agent Melinda May goes in pursuit of the package, but their communications suddenly cut out and Coulson and Grant Ward are attacked by the security team, who eject them from the train and stun them with a grenade containing dendrotoxin, the chemical found in night-night guns. May is also forced to abandon the train and is captured by police chief Luca Russo, who is accepting bribes from Cybertek. Jemma Simmons is stunned by another dendrotoxin grenade, and Skye and Leo Fitz hide her in a luggage carriage before following the security team to Quinn's mansion.

May escapes Russo, who contacts Coulson and Ward and claims he was attacked by Cybertek; he meets them at the Bus but is killed by May. The three of them soon find the abandoned train, with a confused Simmons on board. Skye and Fitz activate a beacon device to alert the others, and Skye enters the mansion, going to find the Cybertek package in the basement. She discovers Mike Peterson in a hyperbaric chamber, before Quinn arrives and reveals that the merchandise is a highly advanced bionic leg, which he attaches to Mike. Mike kills the security team on the Clairvoyant's orders and then leaves, while Quinn shoots Skye twice in the stomach. Coulson's team arrive and apprehend Quinn, and they keep Skye alive temporarily in the hyperbaric chamber, rushing her to a S.H.I.E.L.D. medical facility.

In an end tag, at a playground, Mike asks the unseen Clairvoyant to let him see his son Ace, and receives a message through his eye implant saying 'Not yet'. It is revealed that the bionic leg was developed by Cybertek as part of "Project Deathlok".

== Production ==
=== Development and writing ===
In January 2014, Marvel revealed that the thirteenth episode would be titled "T.R.A.C.K.S.", and would be written by Lauren LeFranc and Rafe Judkins, with Paul Edwards directing. Speaking to the non-linear nature of the episode, LeFranc said she and Judkins wanted to put the team on a mission together "and then see each of their perspectives on it–so that you really get to spend an act with every character, and get just a little more insight into who they are and how they approach the different situations."

=== Casting ===
In January 2014, Marvel revealed that main cast members Clark Gregg, Ming-Na Wen, Brett Dalton, Chloe Bennet, Iain De Caestecker, and Elizabeth Henstridge would star as Phil Coulson, Melinda May, Grant Ward, Skye, Leo Fitz, and Jemma Simmons, respectively. It was also revealed that the guest cast for the episode would include David Conrad as Ian Quinn, Carlo Rota as Luca Russo, T. J. Ramini as Mancini, Ludwig Manukian as the Conductor, Emily Baldoni as Sofia, and a special cameo appearance by Stan Lee. Manukian did not receive guest star credit in the episode. Conrad reprises his role from earlier in the series.

=== Filming and visual effects ===
Filming occurred from December 3 to 13, 2013. Fillmore and Western Railway was used to film the train sequences. FuseFX worked on Peterson's cybernetic leg being attached.

=== Marvel Cinematic Universe tie-ins ===
Coulson reveals that Emil Blonsky / Abomination, last seen in The Incredible Hulk where he is portrayed by Tim Roth, is imprisoned in a "cryo-cell" in Alaska.

== Release ==
=== Broadcast ===
"T.R.A.C.K.S." was first aired in the United States on ABC on February 4, 2014.

=== Home media ===
The episode, along with the rest of Agents of S.H.I.E.L.D.'s first season, was released on Blu-ray and DVD on September 9, 2014. Bonus features include behind-the-scenes featurettes, audio commentary, deleted scenes, and a blooper reel. On November 20, 2014, the episode became available for streaming on Netflix. The episode, along with the rest of the series, was removed from Netflix on February 28, 2022, and later became available on Disney+ on March 16, 2022.

== Reception ==
=== Ratings ===
In the United States the episode received a 2.2/6 percent share among adults between the ages of 18 and 49, meaning that it was seen by 2.2 percent of all households, and 6 percent of all of those watching television at the time of the broadcast. It was watched by 6.62 million viewers.
