= T.A.H.I.T.I. =

- Agents of S.H.I.E.L.D. episode
- Episode no.: Season 1 Episode 14
- Directed by: Bobby Roth
- Written by: Jeffrey Bell
- Cinematography by: Feliks Parnell
- Editing by: Debby Germino
- Original air date: March 4, 2014
- Running time: 42 minutes

Guest appearances
- Bill Paxton as John Garrett; Elena Satine as Lorelei; David Conrad as Ian Quinn; Robert Belushi as Jimmy; B. J. Britt as Antoine Triplett

Episode chronology
← Previous "T.R.A.C.K.S."	Next → "Yes Men"
- Agents of S.H.I.E.L.D. season 1

"T.A.H.I.T.I." is the fourteenth episode of the first season of the American television series Agents of S.H.I.E.L.D. Based on the Marvel Comics organization S.H.I.E.L.D., it follows Phil Coulson and his team of S.H.I.E.L.D. agents as they race to save Skye. It is set in the Marvel Cinematic Universe (MCU) and acknowledges the franchise's films. The episode was written by Jeffrey Bell and directed by Bobby Roth.

Clark Gregg reprising his role as Coulson from the film series, and is joined by series regulars Ming-Na Wen, Brett Dalton, Chloe Bennet, Iain De Caestecker, and Elizabeth Henstridge. The characters look to save Skye (Bennet) by finding out how Coulson was resurrected by S.H.I.E.L.D. following his death in The Avengers. The episode introduces recurring guest star Bill Paxton to the series, and the alien race the Kree to the MCU.

"T.A.H.I.T.I." originally aired on ABC on March 4, 2014, and according to Nielsen Media Research, was watched by 5.46 million viewers. It was nominated for a Primetime Emmy Award for Outstanding Special Visual Effects at the 66th Primetime Creative Arts Emmy Awards.

== Plot ==
Agent Phil Coulson's S.H.I.E.L.D. team rush agent Skye to a medical facility after she was shot twice at close range by Ian Quinn. (Note: As shown in "T.R.A.C.K.S.".) They are soon told that nothing can be done and that they will have to decide whether to keep her on life support or not. Coulson is unable to reach Director Nick Fury, who previously resurrected Coulson, and so decides to go looking for the doctors that brought him back to life himself, knowing that they will be able to save her. As they travel to Bethesda to see Dr. Streiten, who oversaw Coulson's resurrection, Coulson reveals to agents Leo Fitz and Jemma Simmons how he was brought back, despite the information being above their clearance: his injuries were healed and then his brain was stimulated until he woke up. Whatever was used to heal his injuries can be used to save Skye.

Coulson is ordered to take Quinn in by S.H.I.E.L.D., but he knows that he cannot delay, and so keeps him in custody on their plane. They are soon boarded by agents John Garrett and Antoine Triplett. They have been hunting Quinn for some time now, and Coulson, who is old friends with Garrett, convinces them to leave Quinn on board until Skye is saved. Garrett interrogates Quinn on the plane, and Quinn reveals that he was instructed to shoot Skye by the Clairvoyant, who can see everything except for how Coulson was resurrected, and is now forcing Coulson to find out how he was brought back. Coulson learns that Dr. Streiten and the facility where he was treated actually do not exist in Bethesda.

Fitz and Simmons search through S.H.I.E.L.D.'s digital archives and find evidence of an old World War II bunker known as the Guest House with Level 10 access, which is the highest clearance. Not knowing the countersign, the team attack the base and take out the guards, before realizing that there is a failsafe that will shortly destroy the entire facility. They find the drug that healed Coulson's injuries, GH-325, while he also finds the room where he was resurrected, and a room labelled T.A.H.I.T.I. Just before the compound explodes, Garrett finds Coulson, who warns that the drug should not be given to Skye, but by the time they get back to the plane, Simmons has already injected her with it. It saves her life.

Garrett and Triplett leave with Quinn. Agent Melinda May later asks Coulson why he did not want them to use the drug on Skye, and he tells her that he did not want her to suffer the way he did when he was resurrected. However, the real reason is that in the room labelled T.A.H.I.T.I. he had discovered the source of GH-325: a blue, alien corpse.

In an end tag, a mysterious woman named Lorelei wanders through the Death Valley where she meets a newlywed couple and convinces the man to leave his new bride and drive off with her.

== Production ==
=== Development and design ===
In December 2013, Marvel revealed that the fourteenth episode would be titled "T.A.H.I.T.I.", and would be written by executive producer Jeffrey Bell, with Bobby Roth directing. The episode title refers to Project T.A.H.I.T.I., which is an acronym for "Terrestrialized Alien Host Integrative Tissue I". Creating the Kree alien was a complicated process that involved discussions with visual effects supervisor Mark Kolpack, the executive producers, and Marvel CCO Joe Quesada, who created sketches of potential designs. Kolpack's son Brandon, who is a personal trainer and body builder, served as a body scan reference for the Kree alien since they knew the alien should be muscular.

=== Casting ===
In December 2013, two recurring characters were set to be added to the series, starting with this episode. They were described as "an African-American agent who specializes in combat/weapons, and a high-level S.H.I.E.L.D. agent/munitions expert who has past ties to both Coulson and Ward." In January 2014, Bill Paxton was cast as agent John Garrett, "a rough-and-tumble former cohort of Agent Coulson with a little bit of attitude and cigar-smoking swagger". Executive producer Jed Whedon said that Paxton was mentioned when conceiving the character because he is "a guy who can deal with a tough situation, but is going to make a comment about it". Whedon continued that when it "came up as an actual possibility [he would be cast], we couldn't believe it". The next month, B. J. Britt was cast as agent Antoine Triplett, described as being an associate of Garrett. Casting Triplett was difficult according to casting director Sarah Halley Finn, because he had to have humor while still being able to "whip a gun out of his pocket and shoot you believably".

In February 2014, Marvel revealed that main cast members Clark Gregg, Ming-Na Wen, Brett Dalton, Chloe Bennet, Iain De Caestecker, and Elizabeth Henstridge would star as Phil Coulson, Melinda May, Grant Ward, Skye, Leo Fitz, and Jemma Simmons, respectively. In addition to Paxton and Britt, it was revealed that the guest cast for the episode would also include Elena Satine as Lorelei, David Conrad as Ian Quinn, Rob Belushi as Jimmy, Sarayu Rao as Dr. Jazuat, Michael J. Silver as Alpha, Jake Newton as Beta, and Julie Civiello as Nicole. Silver, Newton, and Civiello did not receive guest star credit in the episode. Conrad reprises his role from earlier in the series.

=== Filming and visual effects ===
Filming occurred from December 13, 2013, to January 7, 2014. The Guest House location was filmed at three locations: a small hillside in San Pedro, Los Angeles for the exterior, a water treatment plant for the entrance to the compound, and then on a set for the interior. Whedon thought the episode was the most expensive of the season for visual effects, with the Kree alien a "sneaky cost" beyond simply being a man in a tube, because water had to be added digitally, along with distorting the images seen through the tube.

=== Marvel Cinematic Universe tie-ins ===
As confirmed in the second season, the blue corpse that Coulson discovers in this episode is that of a Kree. Other members of this species went on to play a significant role in Guardians of the Galaxy.

== Release ==
=== Broadcast ===
"T.A.H.I.T.I." was first aired in the United States on ABC on March 4, 2014.

=== Marketing ===
Beginning with this episode, all episodes leading up to the release of Captain America: The Winter Soldier (2014) and the series' crossover with that film were marketed as Agents of S.H.I.E.L.D.: Uprising.

=== Home media ===
The episode, along with the rest of Agents of S.H.I.E.L.D.'s first season, was released on Blu-ray and DVD on September 9, 2014. Bonus features include behind-the-scenes featurettes, audio commentary, deleted scenes, and a blooper reel. On November 20, 2014, the episode became available for streaming on Netflix. The episode, along with the rest of the series, was removed from Netflix on February 28, 2022, and later became available on Disney+ on March 16, 2022.

== Reception ==
=== Ratings ===
In the United States the episode received a 1.8/6 percent share among adults between the ages of 18 and 49, meaning that it was seen by 1.8 percent of all households, and 6 percent of all of those watching television at the time of the broadcast. It was watched by 5.46 million viewers.

=== Critical response ===
The A.V. Club rated the episode a "B−" and praised it for its character development, particularly that of Skye, while stating that the show still needed to "find a way to balance plot acceleration with character development" and that "The agents talk about how they are a family and need each other, but those personal bonds aren't fully formed yet. If S.H.I.E.L.D. is going to deliver truly powerful stories, it needs to find a way to define those relationships and deliver spectacular action." IGN reviewer Eric Goldman gave "T.A.H.I.T.I." a score of 7.7, with the verdict that Agents of S.H.I.E.L.D. "is still not the appointment television program I want it to be, even as it stumbles in the right direction. The introduction of Garrett and some more notable elements added to the Coulson mystery are nice touches. Now if they can just get us to love the core characters as much as we're told they love each other..."

=== Accolades ===
"T.A.H.I.T.I." was nominated for Outstanding Special Visual Effects at the 66th Primetime Creative Arts Emmy Awards, losing to the Game of Thrones episode "The Children".
