= Self Control (Agents of S.H.I.E.L.D.) =

- Agents of S.H.I.E.L.D. episode
- Teaser poster
- Episode no.: Season 4 Episode 15
- Directed by: Jed Whedon
- Written by: Jed Whedon
- Cinematography by: Feliks Parnell
- Editing by: Kelly Stuyvesant
- Original air date: February 21, 2017

Guest appearances
- Natalia Cordova-Buckley as Elena "Yo-Yo" Rodriguez; Mallory Jansen as Aida 2.0; Zach McGowan as Anton Ivanov / The Superior; Jason O'Mara as Jeffrey Mace / Patriot

Episode chronology
← Previous "The Man Behind the Shield"	Next → "What If..."
- Agents of S.H.I.E.L.D. season 4

"Self Control" is the fifteenth episode of the fourth season of the American television series Agents of S.H.I.E.L.D. Based on the Marvel Comics organization S.H.I.E.L.D., it sees S.H.I.E.L.D. infiltrated by Life Model Decoys (LMDs). It is set in the Marvel Cinematic Universe (MCU) and acknowledges the franchise's films. The episode was written and directed by Jed Whedon, and serves as the last in the second "pod" of episodes for the season, subtitled LMD.

Clark Gregg reprises his role as Phil Coulson from the film series, and is joined by series regulars Ming-Na Wen, Chloe Bennet, Iain De Caestecker, Elizabeth Henstridge, Henry Simmons, and John Hannah. Whedon made his directorial debut with the episode, which explores the nature of reality and identity, and features a significant action sequence that took two days to film, a first for the series. Visual effects were used throughout the episode, including to depict the Triskelion building within the virtual reality of the Framework, as set up for the next pod of episodes for the season. The digital model of the building used by Industrial Light & Magic for the film Captain America: The Winter Soldier was given to the series' effects team for use in this shot.

"Self Control" originally aired on ABC on February 21, 2017, and was watched by 3.88 million viewers within a week of its release according to Nielsen Media Research. The episode was praised as one of the series' best, with critics highlighting Whedon's efforts, the emotional sequences throughout the episode, its action and visual effects, and the Framework revelations in the twist ending.

== Plot ==
Having discovered that S.H.I.E.L.D. Director Jeffrey Mace and agents Phil Coulson, Daisy Johnson, and Alphonso "Mack" Mackenzie have all been replaced with android Life Model Decoys (LMDs), S.H.I.E.L.D. Agents Leo Fitz and Jemma Simmons attempt to act normally. The LMDs, not knowing they have been discovered, also attempt to act normally as they plan to carry out the orders of Anton Ivanov, who wants to destroy all Inhumans. Simmons soon discovers that Fitz, rather than Johnson, is the fourth LMD, and overpowers him.

An unknowing Johnson prepares to bring all of the Inhumans under S.H.I.E.L.D.'s jurisdiction to the base for protection, when she discovers a fleet of LMDs based on her likeness; the other top LMDs plan to send these in her place, to murder the Inhumans rather than bring them in. Johnson overpowers the Mack LMD and discovers through the security footage that Coulson, Mack, and Mace are LMDs. She encounters Simmons and, after doubting and threatening each other, both verify that the other is not an LMD by Johnson gently quaking Simmons. They plan to find their replaced friends, whose minds have been uploaded to a virtual world, the Framework, by Dr. Holden Radcliffe. Radcliffe himself has been spending time in the Framework, leaving his LMD assistant Aida to carry out his plans in the real world alongside their benefactor and protector Ivanov. After Ivanov was crippled in a fight with Johnson, Aida manages to keep his severed head alive while giving him a new android body to remotely control. Having arrived at a paradox while trying to follow her prime directives of protecting the Framework and protecting Radcliffe (whom she believes will one day turn off the Framework out of regret), Aida slits her creator's wrists and kills him while leaving his mind to live in peace in the Framework.

The LMDs convince the other agents that Simmons and Johnson are the LMDs while Simmons finds Agents Piper, Davis and Prince and tries to tell the truth. Johnson overpowers the LMDs and the agents believe Simmons after seeing Mack's mechanical parts. They all plan to escape the base to Zephyr One, S.H.I.E.L.D.'s plane. At the base entrance, they find the May LMD, whom Coulson had been keeping in storage and the Coulson LMD had awakened. The latter tasked the May LMD with detonating explosives if the agents tried to escape; however, since she was initially programmed with the real May's personality, she instead lets them go. The agents successfully take off in the Zephyr, just as the May LMD detonates the explosives, destroying all the LMDs and the base.

Johnson and Simmons hack into the Framework from the Zephyr, while Piper, Davis, Prince and Rodriguez watch over their bodies. They find a different world due to Radcliffe changing one regret for each living person that had been uploaded to it: Johnson is in a relationship with the dead traitor Grant Ward, who is alive in the Framework; Simmons is dead; Fitz is rich; Coulson is an anti-Inhuman school teacher; Mack lives with his daughter, Hope, who is alive in the Framework; and Melinda May works for Hydra, who have replaced S.H.I.E.L.D.

== Production ==
=== Development ===
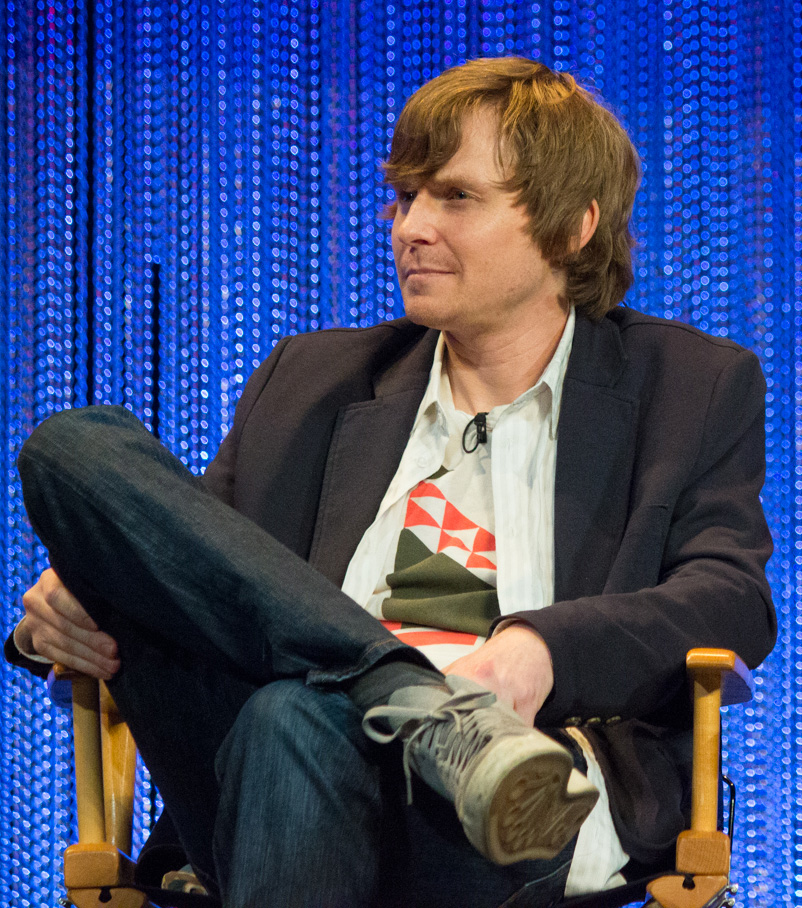
Showrunner Jed Whedon made his directorial debut with this episode, which he also wrote.

In early February 2017, Marvel announced that the fifteenth episode of the fourth season was titled "Self Control", written by executive producer Jed Whedon. A week later, Whedon was revealed to also be directing the episode, in his directorial debut. He felt comfortable taking on the challenge after being so closely involved with the series' cast and crew as showrunner alongside his wife Maurissa Tancharoen, and after seeing both his brother (and series creator) Joss Whedon and her brother Kevin Tancharoen directing episodes for the series. Whedon decided to make his debut during the fourth season after doing second unit work under Kevin on the third season episode "Spacetime".

"Self Control" was described as "pivotal" for the season, serving as the conclusion of the LMD story arc, and containing set up for the final pod of episodes for the season. On choosing to direct this episode specifically, Whedon explained, "I figured just throw me in the deep end and see if I can swim, and I did write a little bit of a deep end in some of it. I think it worked out." Having Whedon both write and direct this episode meant for star Clark Gregg, "there's really no filter between the voice of this really wild episode ... and us. It's really kind of a pure conduit, which is great, because there's some very radical stuff happening, so it's great to be able to talk to him about it."

=== Writing ===
When working on the season's twelfth episode, "Hot Potato Soup", Whedon had initial ideas of what this fifteenth episode would be, including a confrontation between Jemma Simmons and Leo Fitz where they know one of them is an Life Model Decoy (LMD); a subsequent confrontation between Simmons and Daisy Johnson where they convince each other of their humanity; and then the final sequence where the pair enter the Framework. When the writers came to work on the episode, Whedon realized he had not worked out as much of the episode as he had thought, but these three sequences remained the "tentpoles" of the episode's script.

With the LMD Aida killing her creator Radcliffe in the episode, Whedon was asked whether that made her a villain, even the main villain of the whole season. He noted that "She's just doing what she's programmed to do ... she's programmed to protect him and the Framework, and she finds a way to do both that might not be exactly what he imagined, but she's really just reenacting her programming." He added that she is programmed to "mimic human behavior. I think that we're seeing that aspect of her taking over a little bit." On what Aida does to Anton Ivanov in the episode, decapitating him but having his still living brain remotely control an android body, Whedon would not comment on any comic connections this has, but did say that "he is his own sort of creation. He is different than the LMDs. I think Aida wanted to keep his humanity intact, and that was the main impetus to her leaving his brain as the remote control". After the series ended, the producers revealed that they were setting up Ivanov to become a version of the comics character MODOK, as they had been given permission to use him in the series, but Marvel later retracted access to the character. Whedon said that the goal of exploring LMDs for the entire second arc of the season was to use them to explore the nature of reality and identity, and what defines a person, "are you defined by your physical make-up or by your emotional make-up ... by my past actions or by my current actions or by my regrets". This is epitomized by the LMD of Melinda May, whose character arc throughout the storyline ends in this episode with her sacrificing herself to destroy the Phil Coulson LMD and save the human agents. Whedon highlighted a scene where the android sees snow, and remembers May seeing snow before, but says that she herself has never seen it, separating herself from the human May despite them sharing a brain, appearance, and memories.

The episode focuses on the pairing of Daisy Johnson and Jemma Simmons, as they have to fight the LMDs together. Whedon explained that he and the other writers felt that the two "deserved to have some time together", as the series had not yet taken the time to show the characters "unpack [and] hang with each other" following Johnson's recent return to S.H.I.E.L.D. "Their friendship is one we hang about," he continued, "We felt like they were a good pair for this" episode, and they wanted the two characters to not have been replaced by LMDs for the next storyline in the season "when they get into the Framework. It worked out on all fronts." Discussing the conflict between Simmons and the LMD of Leo Fitz in the episode, and the reveal in the end that Simmons is dead in the Framework and Fitz is with someone else, Whedon referred to the pair's relationship as "forever love", saying, "I don't think anything will come between them, but that's why we constantly put things between them, because the longing for them to be together is sort of the feeling that we're addicted to as writers and hopefully the audience is addicted, too ... It's the greatest representation of the price of being a spy is the things that are torn away from you, and there's no better relationship [in the series] to represent that than them."

=== Casting ===
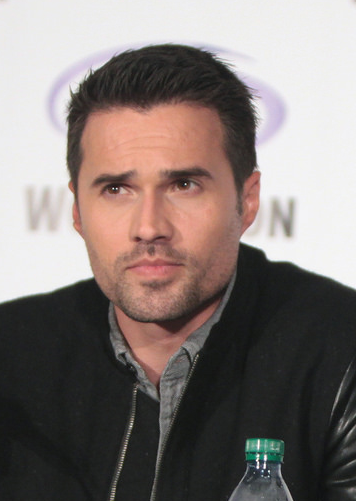
"Self Control" featured a surprise reveal of original series regular Brett Dalton's return to the show, after leaving at the end of the third season.

Marvel confirmed in February that main cast members Clark Gregg as Phil Coulson, Ming-Na Wen as Melinda May, Chloe Bennet as Daisy Johnson / Quake, Iain De Caestecker as Leo Fitz, Elizabeth Henstridge as Jemma Simmons, Henry Simmons as Alphonso "Mack" Mackenzie, and John Hannah as Holden Radcliffe would be starring. The guest cast for the episode includes Natalia Cordova-Buckley as Elena "Yo-Yo" Rodriguez, Jason O'Mara as Director Jeffrey Mace, Mallory Jansen as Aida 2.0, Briana Venskus as Agent Piper, Maximilian Osinski as Agent Davis, Zach McGowan as Anton Ivanov / The Superior, Ricardo Walker as Agent Prince and Cantrell Harris as Agent Fisher. Cordova-Buckley, O'Mara, Jansen, Venskus, Osinki, McGowan, and Walker all reprise their roles from earlier in the series.

The end of the episode reveals that Johnson's boyfriend inside the Framework is Grant Ward, who was portrayed by original series regular Brett Dalton until he left the show at the end of the third season, which killed off the character. Though Dalton himself is not shown in the episode, he is seen as Ward in a photograph for the revelation, and was confirmed by Marvel after the airing of the episode to be returning to the show. Whedon explained the thinking behind reintroducing Dalton, saying, "We figured when you get dropped into an alternate reality, what better way to show that it might not be everything you imagined than the return of one of our most loved and most hated characters. Also, we wanted to have Brett back. We missed him." They made this decision when first developing the three main story arcs for the season. Asked if it was Whedon's choice as director to only show the character in a photograph for the episode, he explained that the decision was made for "multiple reasons—some of it is scheduling, but truthfully it more has to do with Daisy walking by [the photo] unaware. We want the audience to know [it's not Lincoln Campbell, her ex-boyfriend in the real world], but her not necessarily to know" until the next episode.

=== Filming ===
The episode's "ambitious" central fight scene, between Johnson and the LMDs, took two days to film, a first for the series. The fight ends with Johnson using her powers to push the Coulson and Mack LMDs away from her, destroying the Mack LMDs head. For this, Gregg and Simmons were filmed on bluescreen using a slow motion camera, which filmed the pair at 360 frames-per-second (rather than the standard 24). For the sequence where Johnson discovers 20 LMDs of herself in storage at S.H.I.E.L.D., every shot had to be filmed 21 times using a motion control system, with Bennet moving between each position, portraying Johnson or one of the LMDs at a time.

On set, the cast felt more freedom to make changes to the script as they filmed since the writer of the script was there to work with them. For instance, when filming Simmons killing the Fitz LMD, De Caestecker suggested that the android suddenly "go real serious" and grab Simmons by the neck, before going back to pretending to be the real, dying Fitz. Whedon noted that they had fun coming up with these suggestions, laughing between takes of the scene.

=== Visual effects ===
In the Framework, May is shown in an elevator of the Triskelion building, which was seen in the real world in the film Captain America: The Winter Soldier (2014). For this 17 second shot, which starts on Wen as May, pulls back to reveal the elevator, and then again to reveal the entire building, FuseFX was given the digital models that were used in the making of the film: a model of the elevator from Scanline VFX, and the entire digital model of the building from Industrial Light & Magic. For the conclusion of the central fight, visual effects were used to disintegrate the Mack LMD's head. To explain why this also does not happen to the Coulson LMD, who has further scenes in the episode, visual effects show glass taking the force of Johnson's abilities and shattering in a mirroring of the Mack LMD's head disintegration. CoSA VFX also did work on the episode, compositing the Johnson LMD shots together from the 21 individual takes, and creating a CG knife and blood for the scene where Simmons stabs and kills the Fitz LMD.

== Release ==
"Self Control" was first aired in the United States on ABC on February 21, 2017. It began streaming on Netflix, along with the rest of the fourth season, on June 15, 2017.

== Reception ==
=== Ratings ===
In the United States the episode received a 0.6/2 percent share among adults between the ages of 18 and 49, meaning that it was seen by 0.6 percent of all households, and 2 percent of all of those watching television at the time of the broadcast. It was watched by 2.01 million viewers. Within a week of its release, "Self Control" had been watched by 3.88 million U.S. viewers.

=== Critical response ===
The A.V. Club's Alex McLevy praised the episode as "near-flawless", grading it an "A". He compared the episode to previous Agents of S.H.I.E.L.D. episodes "4,722 Hours" and "One Door Closes", saying that "Self Control" "splits the difference between routine and exception ... it takes the best of both of those models and combines them into a single triumphant installment." He praised Whedon, saying that "nearly every decision made here is the right one", and highlighted the combination of Johnson and Simmons, the conclusion of the May LMD's arc, and the Framework reveals. Terri Schwartz at IGN also called the episode one of the best of the series, scoring it an "Amazing" 9.2 out of 10. Schwartz praised the "emotional weight and resonance" of the Johnson/Simmons combination, the Fitz/Simmons confrontation, and the May LMD's final scene, and also praised the quality of the episode's visual effects. Joseph McCabe of Nerdist praised Whedon for transforming the series' pop culture influences "into the most balls-to-the-wall action-packed episode so far this season", finding "exactly the right note of paranoia to play". McCabe also praised the episode's level of blood and violence, taking advantage of the series' 10pm timeslot.

At Collider, Evan Valentine gave the episode an "Excellent" rating of 5 stars out of 5, calling it "one of the best episodes of the season (even sans Ghost Rider!)." Valentine felt the episode elevated the LMD arc "to an entirely new place that I wasn't at all expecting, but am happy to see", and praised Gregg in particular for his performance as the LMD version of Coulson. Writing for Den of Geek, Marc Buxton began by saying, "It took four years, but I think Marvel's Agents of S.H.I.E.L.D. may have finally achieved near perfection ... It's hard to cover every moment that makes this week's [episode] the show's finest hour. I'll just say that this was Jed Whedon's directorial debut on S.H.I.E.L.D., and man, did he ace every freaking frame." Buxton said "Self Control" "will go down as the best episode of [the series] in the four-year history of the show", and rated it 5 stars out of 5. Kevin Fitzpatrick at ScreenCrush called the episode "fascinatingly weird" and emotional, praising the cast and personal moments throughout the episode, as well as the "impressive action". He felt that so much happened in the episode that some of the big reveals were being overshadowed, but that is "a great problem for an hour like "Self Control" to have."

=== Accolades ===
Henstridge and De Caestecker were named as honorable mentions for TVLine's "Performer of the Week" for the week of February 20, 2017, for their performances in this episode. The site praised the pair for the confrontation sequence between Simmons and the Fitz LMD, saying, "While Henstridge toggled between tears and intensity, De Caestecker crushed us by switching from an anguished Fitz, doubling over as he slashed his wrist, to an ice-cold android, plunging a knife into his accuser ... Simply chilling."
