= Agents of S.H.I.E.L.D. web series =

2013–2016 web series

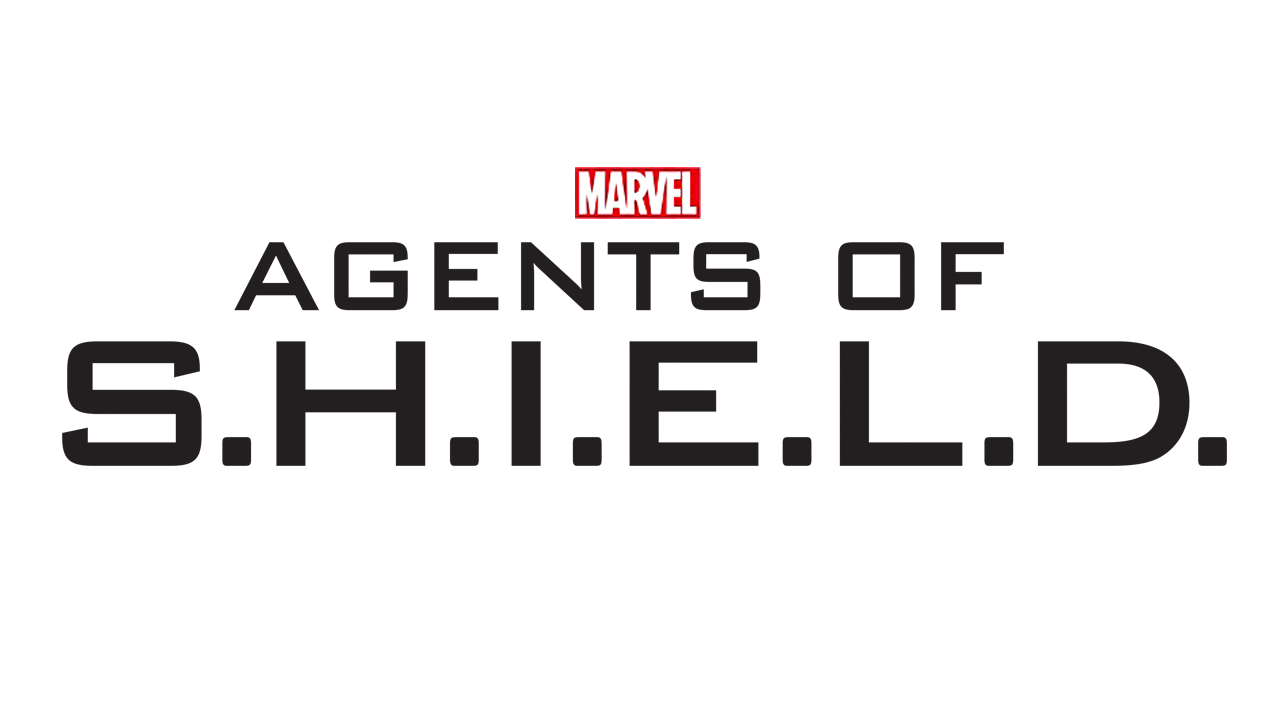

Agents of S.H.I.E.L.D. web series are four web series related to Agents of S.H.I.E.L.D. that aired concurrently with the series between 2013 and 2016. The first series Agents of S.H.I.E.L.D.: Declassified, is a companion series for the first season that recapped and gave behind the scenes information on the week's episode. Agents of S.H.I.E.L.D.: Double Agent follows a newly hired Agents of S.H.I.E.L.D. production assistant, who acts as a double agent for the "Mastermind". Agents of S.H.I.E.L.D.: Academy is a competition show in which three fans competed in different challenges related to the TV series in order to win an appearance on its third season. Agents of S.H.I.E.L.D.: Slingshot is an in-universe series that followed Elena "Yo-Yo" Rodriguez on a mission before the events of the fourth season of Agents of S.H.I.E.L.D.

== Overview ==
Web series in the Marvel Cinematic Universe
| Series | Season | Episodes | Originally released | | |
| Series | Season | Episodes | First released | Last released | Network |
|---|---|---|---|---|---|
| Agents of S.H.I.E.L.D.: Declassified | 1 | 23 | September 23, 2013 | May 13, 2014 | ABC.com, Marvel.com, WatchABC.com, and Watch ABC |
| Agents of S.H.I.E.L.D.: Double Agent | 1 | 5 | March 4, 2015 | May 6, 2015 | ABC.com |
| Agents of S.H.I.E.L.D.: Academy | 1 | 5 | March 9, 2016 | May 4, 2016 | ABC.com and Watch ABC |
| Agents of S.H.I.E.L.D.: Slingshot | 1 | 6 | December 13, 2016 | | ABC.com |

== Agents of S.H.I.E.L.D.: Declassified (2013–14) ==
Title card

Agents of S.H.I.E.L.D.: Declassified is an American web series that originally aired on ABC.com, Marvel.com, WatchABC.com, and the Watch ABC app from September 23, 2013, to May 13, 2014, comprising 23 episodes. The series was a weekly companion digital aftershow that aired after episodes of the first season. Declassified was hosted by Brett Erlich and was sponsored by Verizon Wireless, which was also the presenting sponsor of Agents of S.H.I.E.L.D. on Watch ABC.

Guest appearances by Clark Gregg, Chloe Bennet, Maurissa Tancharoen, Mark Kolpack, Elizabeth Henstridge, Tom Brevoort, Lauren Sankovitch, Ryan Penagos, Iain De Caestecker, Megan Thomas Bradner, Brett Dalton, Ming-Na Wen, Joe Quesada, Paul Zbyszewski.

=== Declassified episodes ===
| No. | Original release date |
|---|---|
| 1 | September 23, 2013 |
Brett Erlich introduces Agents of S.H.I.E.L.D.: Declassified, Agents of S.H.I.E.L.D. and its main characters. Guest appearance by Clark Gregg.
| 2 | September 30, 2013 |
Erlich recaps "Pilot" in a singsongy style. Erlich throws a watermelon from a roof to test the impact a fall would have on a human body.
| 3 | October 7, 2013 |
Erlich recaps "0-8-4". Includes a "Bus preflight safety video". Guest appearance by Chloe Bennet.
| 4 | October 14, 2013 |
Erlich recaps "The Asset" in a diorama style.
| 5 | October 21, 2013 |
Erlich recaps "Eye Spy". Includes a Red Men Group commercial.
| 6 | November 1, 2013 |
Erlich recaps "Girl in the Flower Dress". Erlich and Visual Effects Supervisor Mark Kolpack discuses the fire VFX in the episode. Guest appearance by Maurissa Tancharoen via the VGo Robotic Telepresence Device.
| 7 | November 11, 2013 |
Erlich recaps "FZZT" in a 1980s funk rap song. Includes "Stages of Coping with an Alien Helmet Virus" video. Guest appearance by Elizabeth Henstridge.
| 8 | November 18, 2013 |
Erlich recaps "The Hub" in a video game style. Includes "Marvel's Agents of SHIELD Study Abroad Program" video.
| 9 | November 25, 2013 |
Erlich recaps "The Well" in a sports highlight reel style. Erlich, Senior Vice President of Publishing Tom Brevoort and Thor: God of Thunder editor Lauren Sankovitch discuses Thor's future in the comics. Includes Craig God of Parking teaser.
| 10 | December 9, 2013 |
Erlich recaps "Repairs" in a Campfire story style. Erlich and Executive Editorial Director for Marvel Digital Media Group and Marvel.com Ryan Penagos compare S.H.I.E.L.D. agents to tacos.
| 11 | December 10, 2013 |
Recap of the first half of the season up to "The Bridge". Erlich, Chloe Bennet, Iain De Caestecker, Elizabeth Henstridge, Marvel executive Megan Thomas Bradner and Maurissa Tancharoen talk about the first half of the season and answer fan questions. Includes a "Phil Coulson has been kidnapped" video. Guest appearance by Clark Gregg. Extra long episode.
| 12 | January 13, 2014 |
Erlich recaps "The Magical Place" in a bluegrass music song. Erlich has a "pun off" with Brett Dalton.
| 13 | February 3, 2014 |
Erlich recaps "Seeds" with an ice skating performance.
| 14 | March 3, 2014 |
| 15 | March 10, 2014 |
Erlich recaps "T.A.H.I.T.I." with shadow puppets. Erlich does martial arts training with Ming-Na Wen.
| 16 | March 31, 2014 |
| 17 | April 7, 2014 |
| 18 | April 14, 2014 |
Recap of "Turn, Turn, Turn". Erlich, Clark Gregg, Ming-Na Wen, Chief Creative Officer of Marvel Entertainment Joe Quesada, and Co-executive producer Paul Zbyszewski talk about the Clairvoyant twist, connections with Captain America: The Winter Soldier and answer fan questions. Extra long episode.
| 19 | April 21, 2014 |
| 20 | April 28, 2014 |
| 21 | May 5, 2014 |
| 22 | TBA |
| 23 | May 13, 2014 |

== Agents of S.H.I.E.L.D.: Double Agent (2015) ==
Title card

Agents of S.H.I.E.L.D.: Double Agent is an American web series that originally aired on ABC.com and the Watch ABC app from March 4 to May 6, 2015, comprising five episodes. Double Agent was sponsored by Lexus.

The web series follows a newly hired Agents of S.H.I.E.L.D. production assistant, who acts as a double agent for the "Mastermind", portrayed by Stan Lee. Cast and crew members from the series, such as Clark Gregg, also appear, with viewers having the ability to vote in an online poll after each episode to guess where the double agent would go in the next episode; votes entered viewers in a drawing to win prizes from the set of Agents of S.H.I.E.L.D. Agents of S.H.I.E.L.D.: Double Agent was nominated for Outstanding Digital Series at the 27th Producers Guild of America Awards.

=== Double Agent cast ===
- Stan Lee as The Mastermind
- Marcus Choi as Dirk
- Joseph Bearor as Alex Mind
- Michelle Ortiz as Sam
- Ethan Stone as Marvel Security
- Adrianne Palicki as self
- Clark Gregg as self
- Chloe Bennet as self
- Ming-Na Wen as self
- Elizabeth Henstridge as self
- Brett Dalton as self
- Jed Whedon as self
- Robert Parigi as self
- Laura Harman as Marvel Security
- Ann Foley as self
- Chris Cheramie as self
- Christopher London as Marvel Security
- Scott Bauer as self
- Daniel Spilatro as Dan – 'Post-Production Coordinator'
- Briana Aeby as Editor
- Joshua Ezekiel Parker as Marvel Security

=== Double Agent episodes ===
| No. | Title | Original release date |
|---|---|---|
| 1 | "Infiltrating the Set" | March 4, 2015 |
| 2 | "Searching for Secrets" | March 18, 2015 |
| 3 | "Security Alert" | April 1, 2015 |
| 4 | "Post Heist" | April 22, 2015 |
| 5 | "The Mastermind Is Revealed" | May 6, 2015 |

== Agents of S.H.I.E.L.D.: Academy (2016) ==
Title card

Agents of S.H.I.E.L.D.: Academy is an American web series that originally aired on ABC.com and the Watch ABC app from March 9 to May 4, 2016, comprising five episodes. Academy was produced by Disney-ABC Digital Media Studios and Marvel Entertainment and was sponsored by Lexus.

In Agents of S.H.I.E.L.D.: Academy three Agents of S.H.I.E.L.D. fans, Noelle Mabry, Frank Moran and Ralph Lammie Jr., compete in different challenges related to the TV series in order to win an appearance on its third season. The three contestants later appeared as S.H.I.E.L.D. agents on "Absolution", the first part of Agents of S.H.I.E.L.D.'s two-part season 3 finale. Agents of S.H.I.E.L.D.: Academy was nominated at the 28th Producers Guild of America Awards for Outstanding Digital Series.

=== Academy cast ===
- Clark Gregg as self
- Elizabeth Henstridge as self
- Brett Dalton as self
- Ming-Na Wen as self
- Henry Simmons as self
- Luke Mitchell as self
- Iain De Caestecker as self
- Natalia Cordova-Buckley as self
- Brett Erlich
- Noelle Mabry
- Frank Moran
- Ralph Lammie Jr.

=== Academy episodes ===
| No. | Title | Original release date |
|---|---|---|
| 1 | "Recruitment" | March 9, 2016 |
Noelle Mabry, Frank Moran and Ralph Lammie Jr. attend a casting session where they view a recording of Clark Gregg inviting them to join the Agents of S.H.I.E.L.D.: Academy.
| 2 | "Sci-Tech Challenge" | March 23, 2016 |
Noelle Mabry is brought into an indoor pool where Elizabeth Henstridge appears on a monitor. Henstridge presents her with a situation inspired by the events of "Beginning of the End". A Leo Fitz lookalike is tied and locked underwater, and to rescue him she must solve three math-related challenges. Once completed, she receives the code which is "8-0-4", dives in and tries to unlock the lock. The code turns out to be incorrect. Brett Dalton takes over the transmission and tells her he has changed the order of the digits and that only a real Agents of S.H.I.E.L.D. fan would know the correct order. Mabry successfully guesses the order to be "0-8-4" and saves "Fitz". Henstridge then offers her a part as an agent on Agents of S.H.I.E.L.D.
| 3 | "Skydive Challenge" | April 6, 2016 |
Frank Moran is driven to an airport where Ming-Na Wen and Henry Simmons appear on a monitor. Wen and Simmons present Moran with his challenge which is inspired by Phil Coulson's dive from the quinjet into the portal in "Closure". Moran must skydive and land on a designated S.H.I.E.L.D. landing spot. Before he can jump, Brett Dalton appears on a monitor and tells him that he first must answer three Agents of S.H.I.E.L.D questions; each mistake causes the landing spot to be smaller. Moran answers 2 out of the 3 correct and successfully lands in the designated spot. Wen and Simmons then offer him a part as an agent on Agents of S.H.I.E.L.D.
| 4 | "Inhuman Adaptation Challenge" | April 20, 2016 |
Ralph Lammie Jr. is driven to an outdoor obstacle course where Luke Mitchell appears on a monitor. Mitchell informs him that this simulation sees him emerging from his cocoon and emerging as an Inhuman with the obstacle course testing how well he adapts. After successfully completing the course on time and recovering the coordinates to a S.H.I.E.L.D. extraction point, Lammie enters the car and is driven to the point, but on the way there Brett Dalton appears on the monitor in addition to a Hydra car in pursuit. Dalton tells him that he has to beat the Hydra car to the extraction point while answering questions, with incorrect answers giving Hydra a lead. After successfully reaching the point first, Mitchell appears on the monitor and offers him a part as an agent on Agents of S.H.I.E.L.D..
| 5 | "Commencement" | May 4, 2016 |
Noelle Mabry, Frank Moran and Ralph Lammie Jr. are brought to the set of Agents of S.H.I.E.L.D., where Brett Erlich meets them at the entrance to the Playground set and guides them around and gets them ready for their shoot. He takes them to their trailer where they receive signed merchandise from the cast. The next stop is hair and makeup, where they get treated by Scott Williams the department head hair and RJ McCasland the makeup and FX artist. On the way to the wardrobe department they stop at the Zephyr One, acting out a battle sequence. At wardrobe, Ann Foley, the costume designer, fits them for their roles with Mabry made into a S.H.I.E.L.D. agent and Moran and Lammie S.H.I.E.L.D. tactical agents. The men next stop at props where they met Tom Waisanen, the assistant prop master and get their equipment. The three are then brought back to the Playground, where Keith Potter, the 1st assistant director introduces them to the cast, which include Clark Gregg, Elizabeth Henstridge, Iain De Caestecker, Luke Mitchell Ming-Na Wen, and Natalia Cordova-Buckley, and film their scenes.

== Agents of S.H.I.E.L.D.: Slingshot (2016) ==
Marvel's Agents of S.H.I.E.L.D.: Slingshot is an American web series that originally aired on ABC.com on December 13, 2016, comprising six episodes. based on the Marvel Comics organization S.H.I.E.L.D. and the character Yo-Yo Rodriguez. It is set in the Marvel Cinematic Universe (MCU) and acknowledges the continuity of the franchise's films and other television series; it is a supplement to Agents of S.H.I.E.L.D. The series is produced by ABC Studios and Marvel Television, with executive producer Geoffrey Colo leading the series' crew.

The series follows Elena "Yo-Yo" Rodriguez on a mission before the events of the fourth season of Agents of S.H.I.E.L.D.

Agents of S.H.I.E.L.D.: Slingshot won two Webby Awards and was nominated for a Primetime Creative Arts Emmy Award, a Streamy Awards and two Writers Guild of America Awards.

=== Slingshot episodes ===
| No. | Title | Directed by | Written by | Original release date |
|---|---|---|---|---|
| 1 | "Vendetta" | Joe Quesada | James C. Oliver & Sharla Oliver | December 13, 2016 |
| 2 | "John Hancock" | Feliks Parnell | James C. Oliver & Sharla Oliver | December 13, 2016 |
| 3 | "Progress" | Keith Potter | George Kitson | December 13, 2016 |
| 4 | "Reunion" | Chris Cheramie | Iden Baghdadchi | December 13, 2016 |
| 5 | "Deal Breaker" | John P. Gordon | Iden Baghdadchi & Mark Leitner | December 13, 2016 |
| 6 | "Justicia" | Mark Kolpack | Mark Leitner | December 13, 2016 |

== Accolades ==
| Year | Series | Award | Category | Nominee(s) | Result | Ref. |
|---|---|---|---|---|---|---|
| 2016 | Agents of S.H.I.E.L.D.: Double Agent | Producers Guild of America Awards | Outstanding Digital Series | Agents of S.H.I.E.L.D.: Double Agent | Nominated | |
| 2017 | Agents of S.H.I.E.L.D.: Academy | Producers Guild of America Awards | Outstanding Digital Series | Agents of S.H.I.E.L.D.: Academy | Nominated | |
| 2017 | Agents of S.H.I.E.L.D.: Slingshot | Webby Awards | Webby. Drama: Long Form or Series | Agents of S.H.I.E.L.D.: Slingshot | Won | |
| 2017 | Agents of S.H.I.E.L.D.: Slingshot | Webby Awards | People's Voice. Drama: Long Form or Series | Agents of S.H.I.E.L.D.: Slingshot | Won | |
| 2017 | Agents of S.H.I.E.L.D.: Slingshot | Primetime Creative Arts Emmy Awards | Outstanding Short Form Comedy or Drama Series | Agents of S.H.I.E.L.D.: Slingshot | Nominated | |
| 2017 | Agents of S.H.I.E.L.D.: Slingshot | Streamy Awards | Costume Design | Ann Foley | Nominated | |
| 2017 | Agents of S.H.I.E.L.D.: Slingshot | Writers Guild of America Awards | Short Form New Media – Adapted | "John Hancock" | Nominated | |
| 2017 | Agents of S.H.I.E.L.D.: Slingshot | Writers Guild of America Awards | Short Form New Media – Adapted | "Justicia" | Nominated | |
