= Seeds (Agents of S.H.I.E.L.D.) =

- Agents of S.H.I.E.L.D. episode
- Episode no.: Season 1 Episode 12
- Directed by: Kenneth Fink
- Written by: Monica Owusu-Breen; Jed Whedon
- Cinematography by: Feliks Parnell
- Editing by: Joshua Charson
- Original air date: January 14, 2014
- Running time: 43 minutes

Guest appearances
- Dylan Minnette as Donnie Gill; David Conrad as Ian Quinn; Daniel Zovatto as Seth Dormer; Christine Adams as Anne Weaver; Maiara Walsh as Callie Hannigan

Episode chronology
← Previous "The Magical Place"	Next → "T.R.A.C.K.S."
- Agents of S.H.I.E.L.D. season 1

"Seeds" is the twelfth episode of the first season of the American television series Agents of S.H.I.E.L.D. Based on the Marvel Comics organization S.H.I.E.L.D., it follows Phil Coulson and his team of S.H.I.E.L.D. agents as they investigate attempted murder at the S.H.I.E.L.D. Science Academy. It is set in the Marvel Cinematic Universe (MCU) and acknowledges the franchise's films. The episode was written by Monica Owusu-Breen and Jed Whedon, and directed by Kenneth Fink.

Clark Gregg reprises his role as Coulson from the film series, and is joined by series regulars Ming-Na Wen, Brett Dalton, Chloe Bennet, Iain De Caestecker, and Elizabeth Henstridge.

"Seeds" originally aired on ABC on January 14, 2014, and according to Nielsen Media Research, was watched by 6.37 million viewers.

== Plot ==
S.H.I.E.L.D. Academy scientist cadets Seth Dormer and Callie Hannigan go swimming in the pool late at night, only for the surface to freeze; Dormer is almost frozen but is rescued by another student, Donnie Gill. Leo Fitz and Jemma Simmons are contacted by Principal Anne Weaver to consult in the investigation, accompanied by Skye and Grant Ward.

Meanwhile, Phil Coulson and Melinda May travel to Mexico to find Richard Lumley, Linda Avery's ex-partner who went off the grid after she was murdered. Lumley reveals that he, Avery and other agents went to China in search of an 0-8-4, which turned out to be an infant girl (Skye); the other agents and an entire village died to protect her. Avery hid the child within the foster system, installing a S.H.I.E.L.D. protocol to ensure that she be moved from one home to another to protect her.

At the academy, Fitz and Simmons give a talk to encourage the cadets to remain calm, but during the talk Gill is suddenly frozen, forcing Fitz and Simmons to work quickly to save him. While the rest of the team go to a student hangout in the boiler room to gather intelligence, Fitz befriends Gill to find out if anyone would target him, and is impressed with the devices Gill has been privately designing, giving him advice to perfect his tech. Hannigan reveals that Gill and Dormer in fact staged the attacks on themselves to test their weather machine, and to lure Fitz and Simmons to the academy to trick them into helping perfect the device.

Coulson and May join the others at the academy, and they learn Dormer and Gill were supplied with parts by Ian Quinn, who wants to purchase the completed weather machine. Dormer calls Quinn to secure their deal, and Quinn asks him to demonstrate the machine's capabilities, so he and Gill create a maelstrom around the academy, wreaking havoc. The device is hit by a lightning bolt, electrocuting both of them, and Dormer goes into cardiac arrest before May pilots the Bus into the eye of the storm to rescue them. The storm passes and Gill is incarcerated, having developed cryokinetic abilities from the machine.

Coulson tells Skye what he learned about her origins, initially upsetting her, but she later admits she feels comforted that S.H.I.E.L.D. has been protecting her for her entire life. In an end tag Coulson contacts Quinn to inform him that S.H.I.E.L.D. is watching him, and Quinn responds by telling Coulson that the Clairvoyant says hello.

== Production ==
=== Development and writing ===
In December 2013, Marvel revealed that the twelfth episode would be titled "Seeds", and would be written by Monica Owusu-Breen and executive producer Jed Whedon, with Kenneth Fink directing. Having an episode set at S.H.I.E.L.D.'s academy was one the writers knew they wanted to do.

=== Casting ===
In December 2013, Marvel revealed that main cast members Clark Gregg, Ming-Na Wen, Brett Dalton, Chloe Bennet, Iain De Caestecker, and Elizabeth Henstridge would star as Phil Coulson, Melinda May, Grant Ward, Skye, Leo Fitz, and Jemma Simmons, respectively. It was also revealed that the guest cast for the episode would include David Conrad as Ian Quinn, Christine Adams as agent Anne Weaver, Dylan Minnette as Donnie Gill, Daniel Zovatto as Seth Dormer, Boyd Kestner as Richard Lumley, Zachary Burr Abel as Tad and Maiara Walsh as Callie Hannigan. Kestner and Abel did not receive guest star credit in the episode. Conrad reprises his role from earlier in the series.

=== Filming and visual effects ===
Filming occurred from November 19 to December 2, 2013. College of the Canyons in Santa Clarita, California was chosen to represent the S.H.I.E.L.D. Academy of Sciences and Technologies, while the boiler room hangout set was built. Owusu-Breen said it was "really fun" to design the boiler room hangout, and a lot of thought went into "what it would be like to have all the greatest scientific minds in one area".

The episode's freezing effects were handled by CoSA VFX, while the hurricane sequence was handled by FuseFX, creating one of the most effect-heavy episodes of the season. The hurricane scene was shot with Minnette and Zovatto at the Walt Disney Studios in Burbank, which FuseFX composited along with footage of an actual hurricane that had been manipulated with 3D projection to simulate its movement.

=== Marvel Cinematic Universe tie-ins ===
Skye notes the inclusion of Bucky Barnes on S.H.I.E.L.D.'s Wall of Valor memorial, ahead of his prominent role in Captain America: The Winter Soldier (2014).

== Release ==
=== Broadcast ===
"Seeds" was first aired in the United States on ABC on January 14, 2014.

=== Home media ===
The episode, along with the rest of Agents of S.H.I.E.L.D.'s first season, was released on Blu-ray and DVD on September 9, 2014. Bonus features include behind-the-scenes featurettes, audio commentary, deleted scenes, and a blooper reel. On November 20, 2014, the episode became available for streaming on Netflix. The episode, along with the rest of the series, was removed from Netflix on February 28, 2022, and later became available on Disney+ on March 16, 2022.

== Reception ==
=== Ratings ===
In the United States the episode received a 2.2/6 percent share among adults between the ages of 18 and 49, meaning that it was seen by 2.2 percent of all households, and 6 percent of all of those watching television at the time of the broadcast. It was watched by 6.37 million viewers.
