= 4,722 Hours =

- Agents of S.H.I.E.L.D. episode
- The title card used for the episode in place of the series' usual graphics sequence
- Episode no.: Season 3 Episode 5
- Directed by: Jesse Bochco
- Written by: Craig Titley
- Cinematography by: Feliks Parnell
- Editing by: Kelly Stuyvesant
- Original air date: October 27, 2015
- Running time: 43 minutes

Guest appearance
- Dillon Casey as Will Daniels

Episode chronology
← Previous "Devils You Know"	Next → "Among Us Hide..."
- Agents of S.H.I.E.L.D. season 3

"4,722 Hours" is the fifth episode of the third season of the American television series Agents of S.H.I.E.L.D. Based on the Marvel Comics organization S.H.I.E.L.D., it follows Jemma Simmons, a S.H.I.E.L.D. agent who is stranded on an alien planet. It is set in the Marvel Cinematic Universe (MCU) and acknowledges the franchise's films. The episode was written by Craig Titley, and directed by Jesse Bochco.

Elizabeth Henstridge portrays Simmons, and is joined by guest star Dillon Casey as another survivor stranded on the planet. Series regulars Clark Gregg, Ming-Na Wen, Chloe Bennet, and Iain De Caestecker also briefly appear. The episode was a departure from the norm for the series, focusing on a single character rather than the usual ensemble, and taking place on an alien planet. The episode was filmed in the Californian desert, with a filtering effect used to make it appear to be night on the planet, as its sun rarely rises. The episode took inspiration from multiple science fiction films, and bears similarity to The Martian, which was released close to the episode's airing.

"4,722 Hours" originally aired on ABC on October 27, 2015, and according to Nielsen Media Research, was watched by 6.40 million viewers within a week of its release. The episode received an overwhelmingly positive critical response, with praise going to its bottle episode nature and Henstridge's performance, as well as to the storytelling which was generally seen as overcoming predictable or familiar plot beats. Many critics called it the best episode of the series.

== Plot ==
S.H.I.E.L.D. agent Jemma Simmons is sucked into an alien monolith she is studying, and is teleported to night-time on a barren, desert planet. She braves a sandstorm, and finds water and a plant-like creature to eat. After 752 hours, Simmons is trapped by a man, who eventually introduces himself as Will, an astronaut sent through the portal by NASA in 2001 who has been stranded alone, and believes the planet, or an entity controlling the planet, to be evil. Will and his team had come on a year-long mission of exploration, but the others had soon succumbed to the effects of "it"; two had killed themselves, while Will killed the other when the latter attacked him. Will only survived the next 14 years by hiding from "it", and luck.

Simmons uses Will's equipment, including maps he and his team made of the surrounding areas, to try to find a way back through the portal. While out scavenging for food, Simmons sees a metallic reflection in the distance, and follows it to find an old sword and 19th century astronomy equipment. Realizing that she has entered what Will calls the "No Fly Zone", the area where his fellow astronauts all went before they died, Simmons is soon caught up in another sandstorm—this time, she sees a cloaked figure approaching her and flees back to the cave. Inspired by the astronomy equipment to use the stars and moons, Simmons deduces that the portal's location is fixed but appears to move due to the planet's rotation. By using Will's old NASA equipment and her S.H.I.E.L.D.-issued cell phone, she predicts the portal's next opening, but they arrive at the location to find that "it" has apparently altered the landscape to create an impassable canyon between them and the portal. Simmons loses hope of ever returning to Earth as the portal opens and closes in front of them, and resigns herself to life on the planet with Will. The two grow close as time continues to pass.

4,722 hours since Simmons' arrival, they see a flare in the distance. Running to it, Simmons finds her S.H.I.E.L.D. partner Leo Fitz. As "it" arrives, Will stays behind to hold it off while Simmons reluctantly escapes with Fitz. She tells him of her ordeal, and Fitz promises to help her return to the planet and save Will.

== Production ==
=== Development ===
In September 2015, following the airing of the season's premiere in which the location of the character Jemma Simmons was revealed to be an alien planet, executive producer Jeffrey Bell stated that "at some point we will fully explore what's happened to her". He called it "the craziest thing we've done ... a different kind of episode". The next month, Marvel announced that the episode, the fifth of the season, would be titled "4,722 Hours". It is written by Craig Titley, with Jesse Bochco directing. For "4,722 Hours", instead of the normal title sequence used in the season, the series' title in the episode's typeface silently fades onto the screen over the back drop of the planet Simmons is stranded on.

=== Writing ===
The decision to dedicate an entire episode to Simmons' time on the planet was made early in the planning of the third season, so that the character could rejoin the rest of the cast early in the season while avoiding having the second season's cliffhanger "feel worthless because she's back and she's fine". The use of the titular hours to mark the passage of time came about after the idea of the planet not having a sunrise was set, as using days was then no longer reasonable. The series' writers room worked together to break the story, which took around an hour and a half rather than the usual few weeks. Series writer and supervising producer Brent Fletcher came up with an idea to split the 4,722 hours into five acts, with each written like the chapter of the book. The acts were given labels such as "The Stranger" and "The Plan", and this structure served as the basis for Titley's script. Though many similarities were noted between the episode and the film The Martian, Titley had not seen the film when he was writing the script, and instead was inspired by the general science fiction trope of "a person alone on a planet" and such films as Enemy Mine.

Elizabeth Henstridge described the episode as "a coming-of-age story. I think we see Simmons at the start, and she's never really been combat ready ... we see her have to survive, and just to see her go on this journey from complete despair". Henstridge also noted thriller elements in the episode. On the moment in "4,722 Hours" where Simmons loses hope, Henstridge explained, "I never thought we'd see her get to that place ... It justifies her relationship with Will, too, because she was ready to end it all and he was the one who pulled her back from the brink." Concerning that relationship with new character Will Daniels, the executive producers worked with Titley to try to make it feel earned in the episode, given the fan following of "FitzSimmons" (the potential relationship between Simmons and Leo Fitz). Executive producer Jed Whedon also noted on this that the episode "wasn't a story about the two of them on this planet, but a story about Fitz hearing this and how he will respond. He breaks your heart, at the end, she breaks your heart, and hopefully, you're feeling for all three involved."

Having the NASA astronauts travel to the planet in 2001 was a reference to 2001: A Space Odyssey, which also featured a monolith, while Titley named Daniels' fellow astronauts after his favorite cinematic astronauts: Austin from The Six Million Dollar Man; Taylor from Planet of the Apes; and Brubaker from Capricorn One.

=== Casting ===
In October 2015, Marvel revealed that main cast members Clark Gregg, Ming-Na Wen, Brett Dalton, Chloe Bennet, Iain De Caestecker, Henstridge, Nick Blood, Adrianne Palicki, Henry Simmons, and Luke Mitchell would star as Phil Coulson, Melinda May, Grant Ward, Daisy Johnson, Leo Fitz, Jemma Simmons, Lance Hunter, Bobbi Morse, Alphonso "Mack" Mackenzie, and Lincoln Campbell, respectively. However, the majority of the cast does not ultimately appear, with only Henstridge and De Caestecker playing notable roles; Whedon said that the others basically had "a week off". Dillon Casey guest stars as Will Daniels.

On the series having an episode revolving around a single character, Whedon said, "We have a lot of people on the show and we felt like this year was the year to start branching off into things like this. So, we just committed wholeheartedly". In casting Casey as Daniels, the producers wanted someone who was older than Henstridge, physically unlike De Caestecker, and "doesn't look like [Simmons'] type", to make it less clear that they would end up together.

=== Filming ===
Filming occurred in a work quarry in Simi Valley and in Northridge, Los Angeles near the Mojave Desert during the day, with director of photography Feliks Parnell using a filtering effect inspired by Mad Max: Fury Road to make it appear to be night time. This was seen to be more practical than night shooting in the desert, given that almost every scene takes place during the 18-year-long night on the planet. Because of this, the production struggled with the intense heat of the desert. Around 22 minutes of extra footage was shot for the episode that had to be cut, including a subplot in which Simmons loses her grandmother's necklace and Daniels finds it for her.

On how continuity was emphasized during the making of the episode, Bochco explained that for each of the episode's five acts there was a different stage of hair, makeup, and wardrobe so the crew could depict the physical changes to Simmons as time progresses. Rather than try and film the episode in complete order, which was "impossible" due to location scheduling needs, the production just tried to avoid changing from one stage to another, and then back again. On how much the episode shows "the entity" on the planet, Bochco and Titley compared it to the shark in Jaws, with this episode just showing "[its] fin from time to time", and a bigger reveal of the creature coming in a later episode.

== Release ==
"4,722 Hours" was first aired in the United States on ABC on October 27, 2015. The episode began streaming on Netflix on June 16, 2016.

== Reception ==
=== Ratings ===
In the United States the episode received a 1.4/4 percent share among adults between the ages of 18 and 49, meaning that it was seen by 1.4 percent of all households, and 4 percent of all of those watching television at the time of the broadcast. It was watched by 3.81 million viewers. Within a week of its release the episode was watched by 6.40 million U.S. viewers, above the season average of 5.52 million viewers.

=== Critical response ===
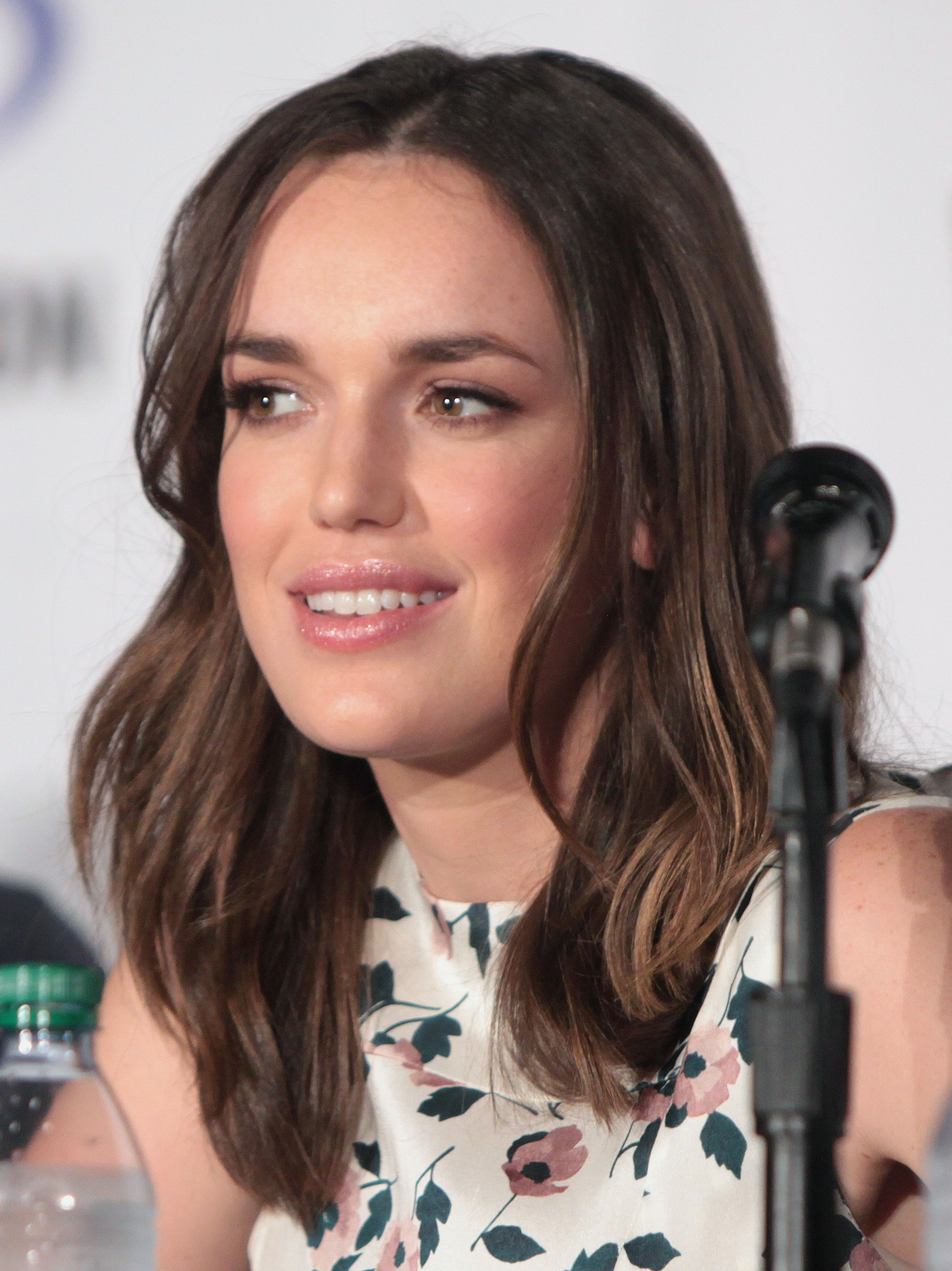
Elizabeth Henstridge received praise for her leading performance in the episode.

Eric Goldman of IGN scored the episode a 9.7 out of 10, indicating an "amazing" episode which he called "a standout ... excellent TV". He praised the bold departure from the series' normal "vibe", Henstridge's "fantastic performance", and the way the relationship between Simmons and Daniels develops throughout the episode, and said that "it's a testament to how well this episode was constructed and how well the story was told that [the familiar/predictable] aspects didn't hinder how involving this was". Oliver Sava at The A.V. Club graded the episode an "A", calling it a "high point of the series that shows the value of breaking from the established formula". He noted how the episode played to different strengths than the similar The Martian, focusing on the more personal aspects of Simmons journey rather than S.H.I.E.L.D.'s attempts to rescue her. He praised the performances of Henstridge and Casey, the episode's simple-yet-effective use of colored filters (in comparison to the series' usual "drab color palette"), and the depiction of Simmons' loss of hope and developing relationship with Daniels, despite the predictable progression of the story.

Den of Geek's Rob Leane was less positive, praising the "brave decision" to focus on Simmons and Henstridge's performance, while noting the "undeniable similarities" between the episode and The Martian, and panning the introduction of Daniels as "more like a plot device than a real driving force for the episode" and the unwanted introduction of a love-triangle to the series. Molly Freeman, writing for Screen Rant, called "4,722 Hours" a "strong hour of television" featuring a dramatic risk in focusing on Simmons that she felt paid off. Freeman stated, "once the dramatic arc of the episode is established, it takes a fairly standard route ... [but] the performance of Henstridge helps to bring enough emotion to give the storyline the weight that it needs". Kevin Fitzpatrick at ScreenCrush called the episode "inventive and unexpected" and "a brilliant gamble", praising Henstridge's performance and the "immersive" quality of the episode, especially the investment in Simmons' personal development with Daniels and attempts to escape the planet, which he felt was "only occasionally marred by the required exposition of its more improbable elements". Fitzpatrick positively compared "4,722 Hours" to the Buffy the Vampire Slayer episode "Hush".

Joseph McCabe of Nerdist stated on the episode, "This week's Agents of S.H.I.E.L.D. is so good that it leaves me in a state of pessimism. Because I can't see any way to follow it up that gives a satisfying resolution to the story it so beautifully presents." He called it "one of the very finest episodes S.H.I.E.L.D. has given us, and one of the few a viewer with almost no prior knowledge of the show can fully appreciate", and praised the handling of Simmons' and Daniels' relationship, saying that Henstridge and Casey "complement one another marvelously". Discussing the episode for Vox, Caroline Framke called it "astonishing", praising the decision to dedicate an episode to Simmons' ordeal rather than just reveal it through flashbacks in "normal" episodes, as well as the efforts of Bochco, Titley, and Henstridge, and the use of the "sinister" on-screen hour counter. Also reviewing the episode for Den of Geek, Marc Buxton scored it 4.5 stars out 5, calling it "the most experimental episode of Agents of S.H.I.E.L.D. to date, and ... it might have been the finest hour of the series so far". Buxton felt that the episode retroactively improved the earlier season three episodes, which he had called "anticlimactic" due to their handling of Simmons' storyline, and praised Henstridge's performance. He also positively compared the episode's villain, which he described as "hard to grasp, mysterious, and ever present", to "the best Steven Moffat Doctor Who villains".

=== Accolades ===
Henstridge was named TVLine's "Performer of the Week" for the week of October 25, 2015, for her performance in this episode, particularly for appearing throughout the whole of it, and for the more "heartbreaking" scenes near the end. The episode was named one of the best television episodes of 2015 by The Atlantic. In June 2016, IGN ranked the episode as the best in the series.
