= Lost in Florence =

- Theatrical release poster
- Directed by: Evan Oppenheimer
- Written by: Evan Oppenheimer
- Produced by: Wendy Blackstone; Michael Mailer; Edward Schmidt; Alessandro Penazzi
- Starring: Brett Dalton; Alessandra Mastronardi; Alessandro Preziosi; Stana Katic
- Cinematography: Gherardo Gossi
- Edited by: Dean Marcial
- Music by: Wendy Blackstone
- Production companies: Michael Mailer Films; Black Sand Pictures
- Distributed by: Orion Pictures; Gunpowder & Sky
- Release date: January 27, 2017
- Running time: 93 minutes
- Countries: Italy; United States
- Languages: English; Italian

Lost in Florence (previously titled The Tourist) is a 2017 romantic drama film written and directed by Evan Oppenheimer. It stars Brett Dalton, Alessandra Mastronardi, Alessandro Preziosi and Stana Katic.

The sport featured in the film is Calcio Fiorentino, an ancient form of soccer traditionally played in Florence since the sixteenth century.

== Cast ==
- Brett Dalton as Eric Lombard
- Alessandra Mastronardi as Stefania
- Alessandro Preziosi as Paolo
- Stana Katic as Anna
- Marco Bonini as Gianni
- Emily Atack as Colleen
- Rob Aramayo as Sal
- Chris Walsh as Dino
- Abbey Blake as Manuela
- Federico Marignetti as Filippo
- Andrea Zirio as Ismaele
- Niccolò Cancellieri as Ettore
- Marcello Moronesi as Luca
- Alessio Di Giulio as Duccio
- Giusi Merli as Signora Artusi
- Federica Bertolani as Concetta

== Production ==
Originally titled The Tourist, filming took place on location in Florence, Italy for four weeks beginning 9 June 2014, and filming completed around 10 July 2014.

== Release ==
In 2016, two years after production, the film was picked up for distribution by Orion Pictures and Gunpowder & Sky, and was released on 27 January 2017.
