= Zachary Abel =

American actor

- Born: Zachary Burr Abel; September 4, 1980 (age 45); Middletown, Indiana, U.S.
- Education: Washington University in St. Louis
- Occupation: Actor
- Years active: 2007–present
- Spouse: Elizabeth Henstridge (m. 2021)

Zachary Burr Abel (born September 4, 1980) is an American actor. He is best known for portraying Carter Anderson in the ABC Family comedy drama series Make It or Break It (2009–2011). For his role, he was nominated for a Teen Choice Award for Choice Summer TV Star – Male.

== Early life ==
Abel was born on September 4, 1980, in the small town of Middletown, Indiana. He studied finance and international business at Washington University in St. Louis.

== Career ==
Abel began his acting career in 2007, when he appeared in an episode of the CBS police procedural drama series CSI: Crime Scene Investigation. He went on to star as Jonah Madigan in the web television drama series My Alibi (2008), a series produced by Take180. In 2009, he appeared in the ABC Family teen drama series The Secret Life of the American Teenager as Max Enriquez, the stepbrother of Adrian Lee. He also appeared as Chad in the horror film Forget Me Not (2009) and as Justin Palma in the comedy film Night Club (2011).

Abel gained further recognition for starring as Carter Anderson in the ABC Family comedy-drama series Make It or Break It, appearing on the series from 2009 to 2011. For his performance, he was nominated at the 2010 Teen Choice Awards in the category of "Choice Summer TV Star – Male", but lost to Ian Harding of Pretty Little Liars. Abel went on to make guest appearances in numerous other television series, including The Big Bang Theory (2009), 90210 (2010), Awkward (2011), The Secret Circle (2011), Agents of S.H.I.E.L.D. (2014), and Criminal Minds (2017).

== Personal life ==
He has been married to English actress Elizabeth Henstridge since 2021.

== Filmography ==
=== Film ===
Year	Title	Role	Notes
2009	Forget Me Not	Chad	
2011	Night Club	Justin Palma	
2012	Je Vous Adore	Claire's Boyfriend	Short film
2018	One by One	Jake	

=== Television ===
Year	Title	Role	Notes
2007	CSI: Crime Scene Investigation	Male Lover	Episode: "Goodbye and Good Luck"
2008	My Alibi	Jonah Madigan	14 episodes
2009	The Secret Life of the American Teenager	Max Enriquez	4 episodes
2009	Hot Sluts	Kale	4 episodes
2009	The Big Bang Theory	Todd	Episode: "The Cornhusker Vortex"
2009–2011	Make It or Break It	Carter Anderson	26 episodes
2010	The Subpranos	Jackson	2 episodes
2010	90210	Zach	Episode: "Best Lei'd Plans"
2011	Awkward	Jamie McKibben	2 episodes
2011	The Secret Circle	Luke	2 episodes
2012	The One 'N Done	Rich	Episode: "An Organic Date"
2012	Shelter	Mitchell Taylor	Unaired pilot
2014	Agents of S.H.I.E.L.D.	Tad	Episode: "Seeds" (deleted scene)
2017	Criminal Minds	Bill Seavers	Episode: "A Good Husband"
2017	High Expectasians	Brian Waterbaum	Episode: "The Casting Workshop"
