= Elizabeth Henstridge =

English actress, model and director

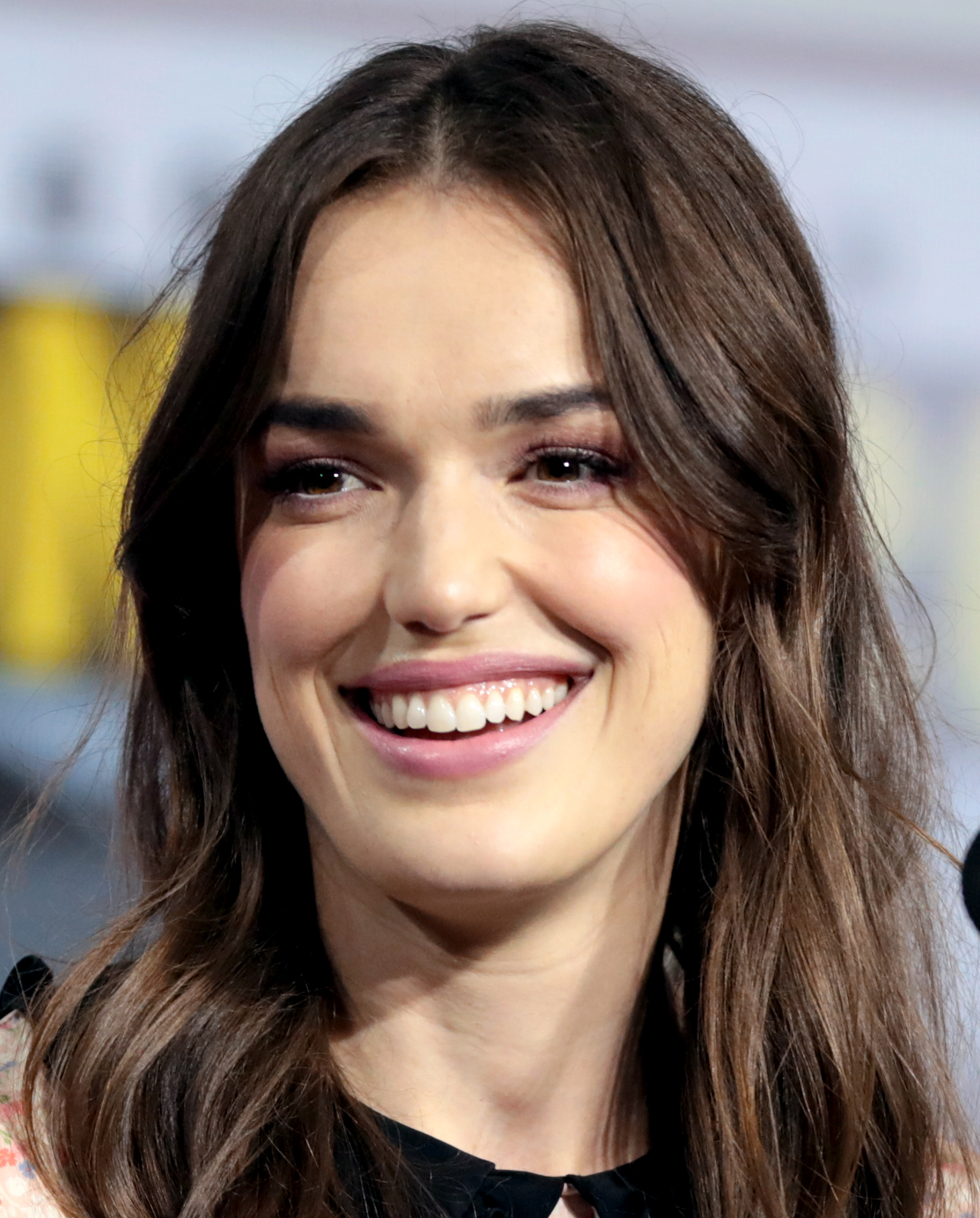
- Henstridge in 2019
- Born: Elizabeth Frances Henstridge; 11 September 1987 (age 38); Sheffield, South Yorkshire, England
- Education: East 15 Acting School
- Occupations: Actress; model
- Years active: 2010–present
- Spouse: Zachary Abel (m. 2021)

Elizabeth Frances Henstridge (born 11 September 1987) is an English actress, model and director. She is best known for her role as Jemma Simmons in the ABC superhero action drama series Agents of S.H.I.E.L.D. (2013–2020), set within the Marvel Cinematic Universe.

== Early life ==
Henstridge was born in Sheffield, England, attending Meadowhead School and King Edward VII School. Henstridge has two sisters. She is of English and Irish descent. She graduated from the University of Birmingham in 2009. She studied at East 15 Acting School and later moved to Los Angeles.

== Career ==
Henstridge made her professional acting debut in the 2010 short film Easy Under the Apple Bough and the 2011 short film And the Kid. She made her television debut in 2011, appearing as Emily Alexander in the long-running British soap opera Hollyoaks.

Henstridge was cast in the lead role of the 2012 The CW pilot Shelter, which was not picked up to series. She went on to co-star in the horror film The Thompsons (2012), the crime drama film Gangs of Tooting Broadway (2013), and the ensemble drama film Reach Me (2014).

In November 2012, Henstridge was cast as Agent Jemma Simmons, a series regular character in the ABC superhero action drama series Agents of S.H.I.E.L.D., which was set within the Marvel Cinematic Universe. The series was ordered on 10 May 2013, and premiered on ABC on 24 September 2013.

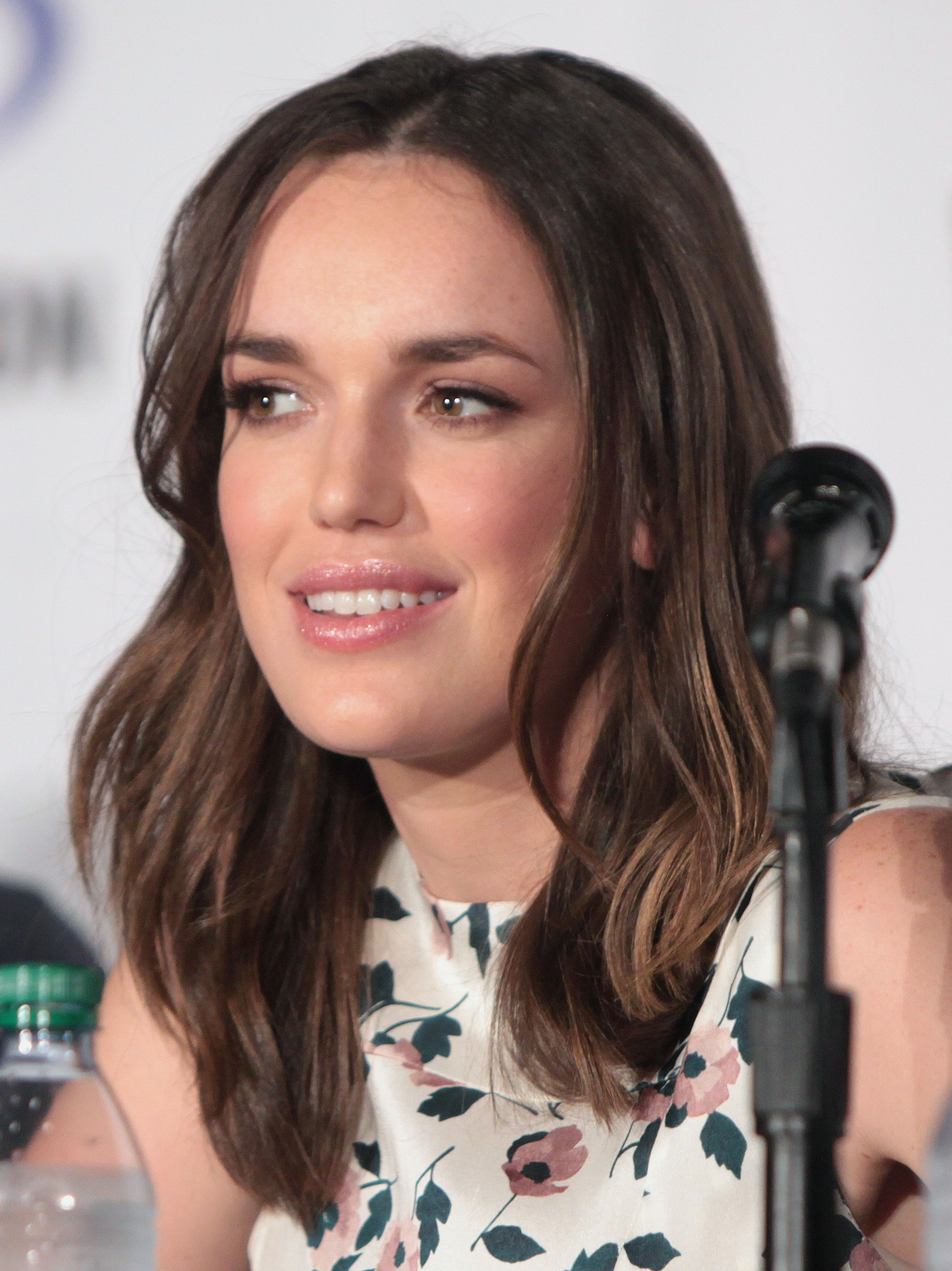
Henstridge in 2016

For her role in Agents of S.H.I.E.L.D., she gained further recognition and acclaim from critics. In 2015, Henstridge received positive reviews for her performance in "4,722 Hours", the fifth episode of the third season of Agents of S.H.I.E.L.D. In contrast to the ensemble nature of the series, the episode contained none of the main cast (except Iain De Caestecker) and was centered around Henstridge's character. The episode's positive critical response focused praise on the bottle episode nature and Henstridge's performance. It was later named one of the best television episodes of 2015 by The Atlantic.

In 2016, Henstridge reprised the role of Jemma Simmons in animated form in an episode of the Disney XD superhero series Ultimate Spider-Man. That same year, she was cast as Abigail Folger in the horror film Wolves at the Door, loosely based on the infamous Manson Family's murders. The film was released Direct-to-DVD in the United States on 18 April 2017.

In 2019, Henstridge starred as Jessica Cooper in the Hallmark Channel Christmas romantic comedy film Christmas at the Plaza. In March 2020, it was announced that she was cast in a leading role in the Apple TV+ drama thriller series Suspicion, alongside Uma Thurman. Henstridge plays Tara, a junior research fellow at Oxford and one of the suspects in the Leo Newman case.

As well as this, Henstridge has also starred in the short film The Imperfect Picture as Anna, and has done more directing. A short film she directed, Air, is now debuting in the festival circuit. In 2019, it was revealed that she was involved in an untitled superhero film that she starred, directed, wrote and produced.

In October 2024, ahead of Superman and Lois's final season, it was announced that she is set to play Lex Luthor's daughter Elizabeth Luthor, who is loosely based on the second Lena Luthor. She is also credited with directing many episodes from the series since 2022.

== Personal life ==
Henstridge had been in a relationship with actor and online influencer Zachary Abel since 2012. They met on the set of Shelter. On 22 April 2019, she announced their engagement with an Instagram post. The two were married in England in August 2021.

Henstridge has a dog named Maggie, and she supports Smile Train, a charity organization.

== Filmography ==
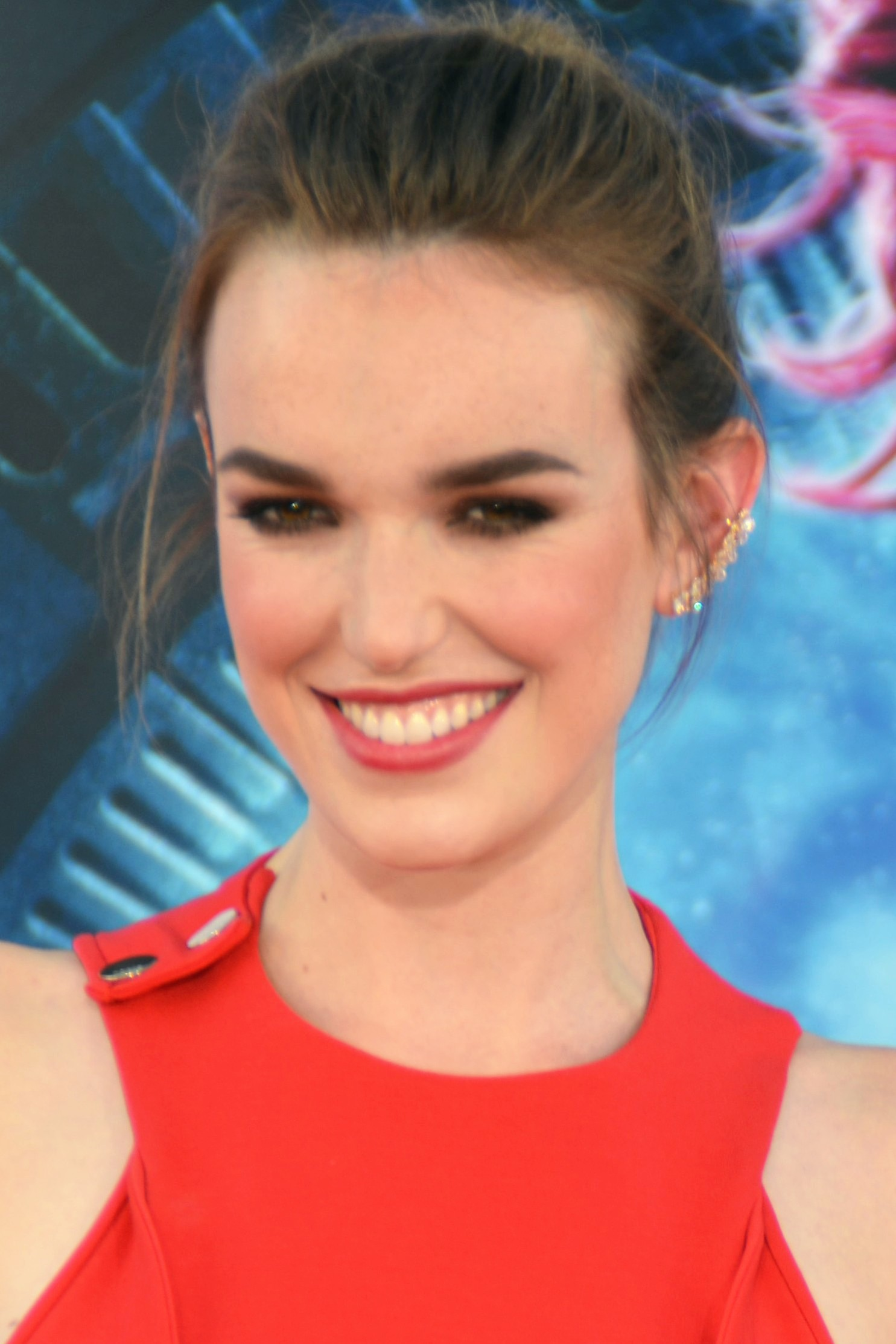
Henstridge at the premiere of Guardians of the Galaxy in July 2014.

=== Film ===
| Year | Title | Role | Notes |
|---|---|---|---|
| 2012 | The Thompsons | Riley Stuart | |
| 2013 | Gangs of Tooting Broadway | Kate | |
| 2014 | Reach Me | Eve | |
| 2016 | Wolves at the Door | Abigail Folger | |
| 2019 | Christmas at the Plaza | Jessica Cooper | |
| 2023 | Mystery Island | Dr. Emilia Priestly | |
| 2025 | Mystery Island: Winner Takes All | Dr. Emilia Priestly | |
| 2025 | Mystery Island: Play For Keeps | Dr. Emilia Priestly | |
| 2025 | Mystery Island: House Rules | Dr. Emilia Priestly | |

=== Television ===
| Year | Title | Role | Notes |
|---|---|---|---|
| 2011 | Hollyoaks | Emily Alexander | 3 episodes |
| 2012 | Shelter | Grace | Unsold The CW pilot |
| 2013–2020 | Agents of S.H.I.E.L.D. | Jemma Simmons | Main role; also director, episode: "As I Have Always Been" |
| 2014 | Film School Shorts | The Virgin | Episode: "Sugar & Spice" |
| 2015–2017 | Penn Zero: Part-Time Hero | Princess (voice) | 3 episodes |
| 2015 | Agents of S.H.I.E.L.D.: Double Agent | Herself | Episode: "Security Alert" |
| 2016 | Ultimate Spider-Man | Jemma Simmons (voice) | Episode: "Lizards" |
| 2016 | Agents of S.H.I.E.L.D.: Academy | Herself | Episodes: "Sci-Tech Challenge", "Commencement" |
| 2016 | Agents of S.H.I.E.L.D.: Slingshot | Jemma Simmons | Episode: "Progress" |
| 2017 | Temporary | Emily | Episode: "Poe Fashion" |
| 2022 | Suspicion | Tara | Main role |
| 2022–2024 | Superman & Lois | Elizabeth Luthor | Episode: "Break the Cycle"; also directed 3 episodes |
| 2023 | Gotham Knights | —N/a | Director; episode: "Poison Pill" |

== Awards and nominations ==
| Year | Award | Category | Work | Result |
|---|---|---|---|---|
| 2015 | TVLine's Performer of the Week | Performance in "4,722 Hours" | Agents of S.H.I.E.L.D. | Won |
| 2017 | TVLine's Performer of the Week | Performance in "Self Control" (shared with Iain De Caestecker) | Agents of S.H.I.E.L.D. | Nominated |
| 2019 | TVLine's Performer of the Week | Performance in "Inescapable" (shared with Iain De Caestecker) | Agents of S.H.I.E.L.D. | Won |
| 2020 | TVLine's Performer of the Week | Performance in "The End Is at Hand"/"What We're Fighting For" | Agents of S.H.I.E.L.D. | Won |
