= Iain De Caestecker =

Scottish actor

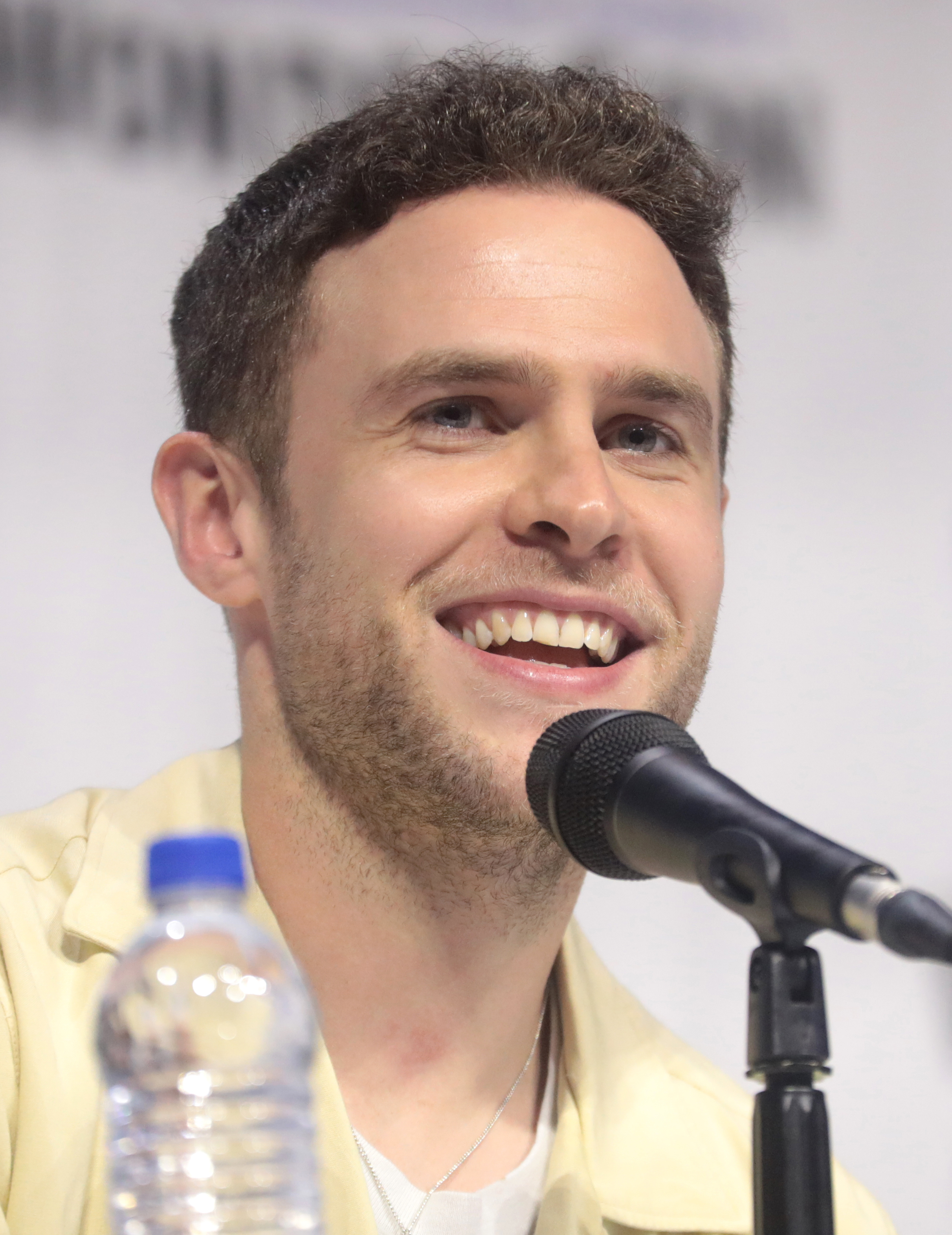
- De Caestecker in 2019
- Born: Glasgow, Scotland
- Education: Langside College
- Occupation: Actor
- Years active: 1996–present
- Partner: Ann Skelly (2021–present)

Iain De Caestecker (/də ˈkæskər/ də KAS-kər;) is a Scottish actor. He is best known for portraying Leopold Fitz/The Doctor in the television series Agents of S.H.I.E.L.D. (2013–2020). He is also known for his roles in Coronation Street (2001–2003) as Adam Barlow and the films Shell (2012), In Fear (2013), Not Another Happy Ending (2013), Lost River (2014), and Overlord (2018).

== Early life and education ==
Iain De Caestecker was born in Glasgow, Scotland. He is of Belgian descent through his paternal grandfather. He has a twin sister and two older brothers. His parents are both medical doctors. As of 2011 his mother, Linda De Caestecker, was Director of Public Health (DPH) for NHS Greater Glasgow and Clyde, the largest health board in Scotland. She was also an honorary professor at the University of Glasgow.

De Caestecker went to Hillhead Primary School. He completed an HND in acting and performance at Langside College.

Acting was always just something I knew I wanted to do, which I feel very fortunate for. And yes, my mum was always very supportive. But she— I think basically when I got to 16, I think she basically said, look, "Spend a year," because I was acting at that point and she said, "Spend a year. Please concentrate hard in school and try and get the grades to do medicine. And if you do and you still want to do it, I'll support you all the way." And so I did. And I got the grades to do medicine. And still after that I said, look, I'd really like to pursue acting.

— Iain De Caestecker, Masterpiece Studio Podcast

== Career ==
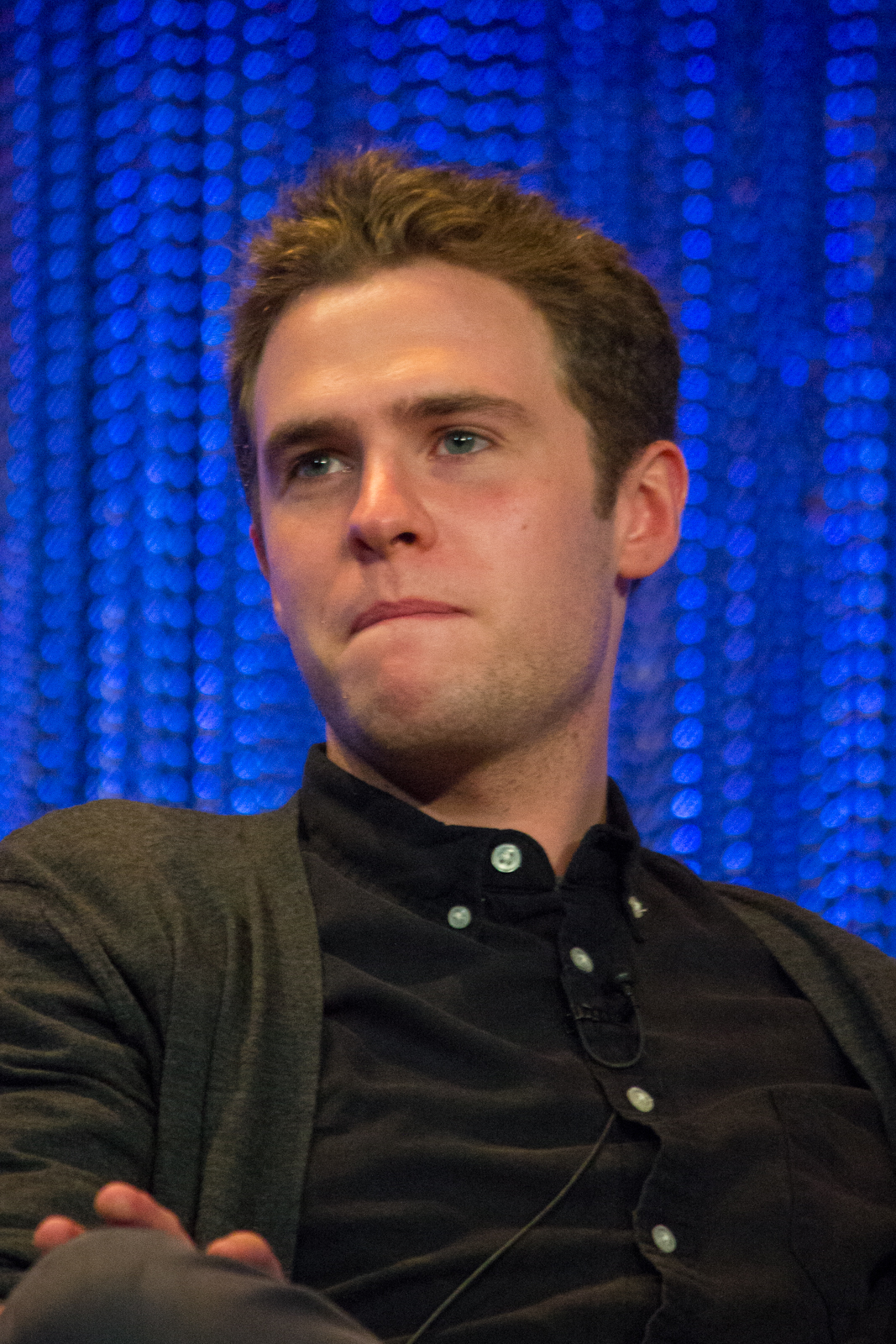
De Caestecker at PaleyFest 2014

De Caestecker made his professional acting debut in the BBC short film Billy and Zorba at the age of nine. This was followed by a minor role as a bully in the comedy horror film The Little Vampire. The following year he first appeared as Adam Barlow in Coronation Street, appearing in 54 episodes between 2001 and 2003 before the role was recast with an older actor. In 2010, De Caestecker appeared in serial drama Lip Service.

He played the lead in BAFTA-winning BBC series The Fades and Young James Herriot; the latter earned him a nomination for a BAFTA Scotland for Best Actor/Actress – Television.

The psychological horror film In Fear premiered at the 2013 Sundance Film Festival to rave reviews. That same year, De Caestecker appeared in Filth ("I'm a big fan of Irvine Welsh and [...] I got to play all my scenes with James McAvoy which meant a lot to me") and Not Another Happy Ending; the latter earned him his second BAFTA Scotland nomination, this time in the Best Actor/Actress – Film category. He also appeared in the music video for Gabrielle Aplin's song Please Don't Say You Love Me.

On his first visit to Los Angeles, De Caestecker landed a series regular role on the Marvel television series Agents of S.H.I.E.L.D. (2013–2020). He played scientist Leo Fitz and was a part of the main cast from Seasons 1 through 6. In the seventh and final season, he appeared as a special guest star. He explained his choice not to return fully for the seventh season, saying “Not that I didn’t love it and love everyone involved, but I felt by the end it was time to be done. I had been in a warm country for five years and it didn’t feel like home to me.” His Agents of S.H.I.E.L.D. character was animated for an episode of Disney XD's Ultimate Spider-Man vs. the Sinister 6, to which the actor lent his voice.

In 2014, De Caestecker played the lead role in Ryan Gosling's directorial debut Lost River. The film premiered in competition in the Un certain regard section at the 67th Cannes Film Festival.

In 2018, De Caestecker co-starred in the J. J. Abrams-produced war horror film Overlord. The movie received two nominations at the 2019 Saturn Awards.

In 2020, De Caestecker starred as young Douglas Petersen in BBC One's four-part miniseries Us, based on David Nicholls' novel of the same name. In the same year he also starred opposite Hugh Laurie in the PBS Masterpiece / BBC One political-thriller series Roadkill. He then filmed the horror short Upstairs.

In 2022, De Caestecker led the cast of BBC One's three-part drama The Control Room. In March 2022, it was announced that he would be making a guest appearance on a new podcast show called Conference Call, from French-American podcast network Paradiso Media, along with Jeff Ward, Elizabeth Henstridge, and Clark Gregg.

== Filmography ==
=== Film ===
Year	Title	Role	Notes
1999	Billy and Zorba	Billy	Short film for BBC | Winner Best International Short - Brooklyn Film Festival, 2000
2000	The Little Vampire	Nigel	
2003	16 Years of Alcohol	Frankie (as a boy)	
2003	All Over Brazil	Steven	Short film for BBC
2012	Up There	Tommy	
2012	Shell	Adam	
2013	In Fear	Tom	Official Sundance selection
2013	Not Another Happy Ending	Roddy	
2013	Filth	Ocky	
2014	Lost River	Bones	Official Cannes Film Festival selection
2014	Liam and Lenka	Liam	Short film
2018	Overlord	Private Morton Chase	
2021	Upstairs	Tim	Short film

=== Television ===
Year	Title	Role	Notes
2001–2003	Coronation Street	Adam Barlow	54 episodes
2001	Monarch of the Glen	Angus "Ricky" MacDonald	Episode: "Episode #2.8"; Credited as Iain Decaestecker
2002	Rockface	Dan	Episode: "Episode #1.3"
2009	River City	Stuart	Episode: "Episode #1.607"
2009	Taggart	Davy Kincaid	Episode: "So Long Baby"
2010	Lip Service	Darren	4 episodes
2011	The Fades	Paul Roberts	Miniseries; 6 episodes / Winner of Best Drama Series, BAFTA Television Awards, 2012
2011	Young James Herriot	James Herriot	Miniseries; 3 episodes
2012	The Secret of Crickley Hall	Young Percy Judd	Miniseries; 3 episodes
2013–2020	Agents of S.H.I.E.L.D.	Agent Leo Fitz	Main Cast (Seasons 1-6), Special Guest Star (Season 7); 122 episodes
2016	Ultimate Spider-Man vs. the Sinister 6	Agent Leo Fitz	Voice role; episode: "Lizards"
2016	Agents of S.H.I.E.L.D.: Academy	Himself	Episode: "Commencement"
2016	Agents of S.H.I.E.L.D.: Slingshot	Agent Leo Fitz	Web series; episode: "Progress"
2020	Us	Young Douglas	Miniseries; 4 episodes
2020	Roadkill	Duncan Nock	Miniseries; 4 episodes
2022	The Control Room	Gabe	Miniseries; 3 episodes
2023	The Winter King	Arthur Pendragon	Main cast (Season 1)
2027	The Twin †	Marty	Miniseries
TBA	Sutherland †	TBA	Upcoming six-part drama

=== Video games ===
Year	Title	Role
2012	Assassin's Creed III	Fillan McCarthy (voice)

=== Music videos ===
Year	Title	Artist	Role
2013	"Please Don't Say You Love Me"	Gabrielle Aplin	Boyfriend

== Awards and nominations ==
Year	Award	Category	Work	Result
2012	BAFTA Scotland Award	Best Actor/Actress – Television	Young James Herriot	Nominated
2013	BAFTA Scotland Award	Best Actor/Actress – Film	Not Another Happy Ending	Nominated
2014	SET Awards	SET Engineer Award	Agents of S.H.I.E.L.D.	Won
2015	TVLine's Performer of the Week	—N/a	Agents of S.H.I.E.L.D. (episode: "Laws of Nature")	Won
2017	TVLine's Performer of the Week	—N/a	Agents of S.H.I.E.L.D. (episode: "Self Control"; shared with Elizabeth Henstridge)	Nominated
2017	TVLine's Performer of the Year	—N/a	Agents of S.H.I.E.L.D.	Nominated
2019	TVLine's Performer of the Week	—N/a	Agents of S.H.I.E.L.D. (episode: "Inescapable"; shared with Elizabeth Henstridge)	Won
