= Brett Dalton =

American actor (born 1983)

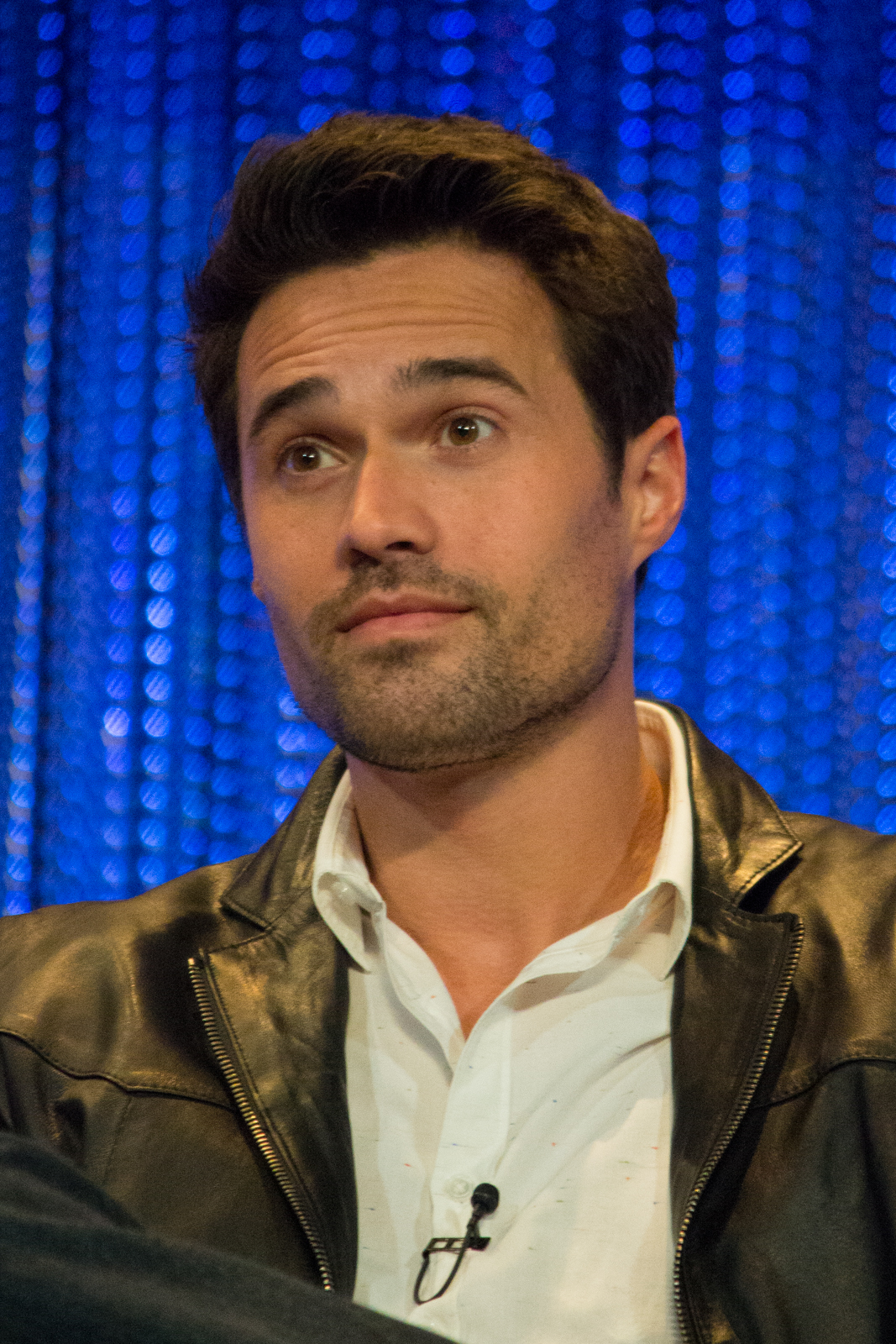
- Dalton in 2014
- Born: Brett Patrick Dalton; January 7, 1983 (age 43); San Jose, California, U.S.
- Education: University of California, Berkeley (BA); Yale University (MFA)
- Occupation: Actor
- Years active: 2007–present
- Spouse: Melissa Trn (m. 2015; sep. 2019)
- Children: 1

Brett Patrick Dalton (born January 7, 1983) is an American actor. He is best known for playing Grant Ward and therefore Hive in ABC's series Agents of S.H.I.E.L.D., as well as Detective Mark Trent in the NBC procedural drama series Found, and Michael "Mike" Munroe in the 2015 video game Until Dawn. He also provided the voice and motion capture for Freyr in God of War: Ragnarök (2022).

== Early life & education ==
Dalton was born January 7, 1983. In 2001, he graduated from Westmont High School in Campbell, California, where he became interested in acting after auditioning for a production of One Flew Over the Cuckoo's Nest and where he was California Scholarship Federation president and associated student body president. He played the lead in My Favorite Year. After studying at University of California, Berkeley for his undergraduate degree, Dalton received a Master of Fine Arts from the Yale School of Drama in 2011. One of his Yale classmates was Oscar winner Lupita Nyong'o.

== Career ==
In November 2012, he was cast in a starring role in the Joss Whedon TV series Agents of S.H.I.E.L.D. as Agent Grant Ward and Hive. The series follows character Phil Coulson and his small team of agents, Dalton's character among them. Dalton's other television credits include Blue Bloods, Army Wives, and National Geographic Channel's Killing Lincoln, a Tony and Ridley Scott Production. His theatre credits include Passion Play, Romeo and Juliet, and Happy Now? (Yale Repertory); Sweet Bird of Youth and Demon Dreams (Williamstown Theatre Festival); Macbeth (Macbeth) You Can't Take It With You (Chautauqua Theater Company), and The Understudy (Westport Country Playhouse).

On May 16, 2014, Dalton was cast in indie drama film Lost in Florence as Eric Lombard, a heartbroken former college football star who gets in over his head with a dangerous Florentine sport and alluring local woman, alongside Stana Katic and Emily Atack.

In 2015, Dalton voiced the character Mike in Until Dawn (2015), an action survival horror video game developed by Supermassive Games and published by Sony Computer Entertainment for the PlayStation 4. In February, Dalton was nominated by the National Academy of Video Game Trade Reviewers for his performance.

Dalton stars in The Resurrection of Gavin Stone, a film released on January 20, 2017, by Walden Media and Vertical Church Films.

In 2021, Dalton was cast in a recurring role in NBC drama series Chicago Fire as Interim Lieutenant Jason Pelham.

Starting in 2022, Dalton provided the voice of The Witness in The Witch Queen (2022), Lightfall (2023), and The Final Shape (2024), 3 major expansions for Bungie 's 2017 first person shooter Destiny 2.

== Personal life ==
Brett lived in Los Angeles with his wife Melissa Trn and their daughter, who was born in 2012. The couple separated on August 1, 2019 and Dalton filed for divorce in November 2019.

== Filmography ==
=== Film ===
| Year | Title | Role | Notes |
|---|---|---|---|
| 2014 | Beside Still Waters | James Miller | |
| 2017 | The Resurrection of Gavin Stone | Gavin Stone | |
| 2017 | Lost in Florence | Eric Lombard | |
| 2020 | Superman: Man of Tomorrow | Rudolph "Rudy" Jones / Parasite | Voice, direct-to-video |
| 2023 | Justice League: Warworld | Bat Lash | Voice, direct-to-video |
| 2024 | Justice League Crisis on Infinite Earths - Part Three | Bat Lash, Captain Atom | Voice, direct-to-video |

=== Television ===
| Year | Title | Role | Notes |
|---|---|---|---|
| 2007 | Nurses | Dr. Kurt Taylor | Unsold pilot |
| 2012 | Blue Bloods | Phillip Gibson | Episode: "Collateral Damage" |
| 2012 | Army Wives | Henry | Episode: "Fatal Reaction" |
| 2013 | Killing Lincoln | Robert Todd Lincoln | National Geographic television film |
| 2013–2017 | Agents of S.H.I.E.L.D. | Grant Ward, Hive | Main role (seasons 1, 2, 3), recurring role (season 4); 58 episodes Won – Teen Choice Award for Choice TV: Male Breakout Star (2014); Nominated – Teen Choice Award for Choice TV Villain (2016) |
| 2014–2015 | Jake and the Never Land Pirates | Talon | Voice; 2 episodes |
| 2015 | Agents of S.H.I.E.L.D.: Double Agent | Himself | Episode: "Security Alert" |
| 2015, 2018 | Robot Chicken | Doctor Manhattan / Fred Jones / Various roles | Voice; 2 episodes |
| 2016 | Agents of S.H.I.E.L.D.: Academy | Himself | Episodes: "Sci-Tech Challenge", "Skydive Challenge", "Inhuman Adaptation" |
| 2017–2018 | Milo Murphy's Law | Brick | Voice; recurring role |
| 2018 | Cooking with Love | Stephen Harris | Hallmark Channel television film |
| 2018 | Elementary | Ryan Hayes | Episode: "An Infinite Capacity for Taking Pains" |
| 2018 | Deception | Isaac Walker | Episode: "Loading Up" |
| 2018 | Once Upon a Christmas Miracle | Christopher Dempsey | Hallmark Movies & Mysteries Channel television film |
| 2020 | Just My Type | Martin Clayborne | Hallmark Channel television film |
| 2021 | Ghostwriter | Captain Vincent | 3 episodes |
| 2021 | One December Night | Jason Bedford | Hallmark Movies & Mysteries Channel television film |
| 2021–2022 | Chicago Fire | Lieutenant Jason Pelham | Recurring role; 9 episodes |
| 2022 | The Equalizer | Carter Griffin | 4 episodes |
| 2023–2024 | Hamster & Gretel | Mayor Meyer | 6 episodes |
| 2023–2025 | Found | Mark Trent | Main cast |
| 2025 | Boots | Sgt. Pitowski | 2 episodes |

=== Video games ===
| Year | Title | Role | Notes |
|---|---|---|---|
| 2015, 2024 | Until Dawn | Michael "Mike" Munroe | Voice and motion capture performance; Nominated – National Academy of Video Game Trade Reviewers Award for Best Supporting Role in a Drama |
| 2022 | Destiny 2: The Witch Queen | The Witness | Voice |
| 2022 | God of War Ragnarök | Freyr | Voice and motion capture performance |
| 2023 | Destiny 2: Lightfall | The Witness | Voice |
| 2024 | Destiny 2: The Final Shape | The Witness | Voice |
