= The New Deal (Agents of S.H.I.E.L.D.) =

- Agents of S.H.I.E.L.D. episode
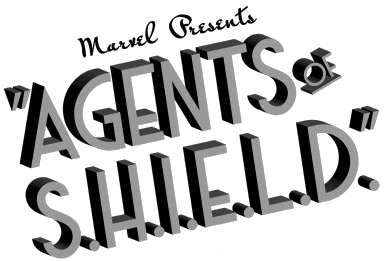
- Title card for the episode, featuring a logo and font styled like a noir film, reflective of the episode's 1930s setting
- Episode no.: Season 7 Episode 1
- Directed by: Kevin Tancharoen
- Written by: George Kitson
- Cinematography by: Allan Westbrook
- Editing by: Eric Litman
- Original air date: May 27, 2020
- Running time: 43 minutes

Guest appearances
- Joel Stoffer as Enoch; Tobias Jelinek as William Dole / Luke; Joe Reegan as a Chronicom; Darren Barnet as Wilfred "Freddy" Malick; Nora Zehetner as Freddy's contact; Greg Finley as Tillman; Luke Baines as Luke; Patton Oswalt as Ernest "Hazard" Koenig

Episode chronology
← Previous "New Life"	Next → "Know Your Onions"
- Agents of S.H.I.E.L.D. season 7

"The New Deal" is the first episode of the seventh season of the American television series Agents of S.H.I.E.L.D. Based on the Marvel Comics organization S.H.I.E.L.D., it follows a Life Model Decoy (LMD) of Phil Coulson and his team of S.H.I.E.L.D. agents as they race to stop the Chronicoms from unraveling history in 1931. It is set in the Marvel Cinematic Universe (MCU) and acknowledges the franchise's films. The episode was written by George Kitson and directed by Kevin Tancharoen.

Clark Gregg reprises his role as Coulson from the film series, starring alongside Ming-Na Wen, Chloe Bennet, Elizabeth Henstridge, Henry Simmons, Natalia Cordova-Buckley, and Jeff Ward. The episode begins where the sixth season ended, with the characters traveling to the 1930s. Filming took place in California beginning in February 2019, with authentic period costumes designed for the season and visual effects used to help create the period setting. Patton Oswalt guest stars as an ancestor of his Koenig characters while Darren Barnet portrays Wilfred "Freddy" Malick, the father of Gideon Malick, another character from previous seasons.

"The New Deal" originally aired on ABC on May 27, 2020, and was watched by 1.82 million viewers. The episode received positive reviews, with critics highlighting Gregg and his return to the Coulson character after portraying a different character in the sixth season. Praise also went to Oswalt's guest appearance as well as the episode's story and pacing.

== Plot ==
In 1931 New York City, a group of aliens called Chronicoms steal the faces of three police officers and kill a contact from a local speakeasy. Meanwhile, having just arrived in the past to stop the Chronicoms from changing history, S.H.I.E.L.D. agent Jemma Simmons introduces Director Alphonso "Mack" Mackenzie and Agent Daisy Johnson to an LMD version of the late former Director Phil Coulson, who struggles with his existence and two years' worth of adventures that S.H.I.E.L.D. went through that he was not around for. Taking on period-appropriate disguises, Johnson and Agent Deke Shaw investigate the faceless officers and are attacked by the Chronicoms, though they overpower one and take him back to their mobile headquarters, Zephyr One. Concurrently, Coulson and Mack investigate the speakeasy since it will become a future S.H.I.E.L.D. asset and meet its owner, Ernest "Hazard" Koenig, who reveals that the police officers were providing security for a function in honor of Governor Franklin D. Roosevelt.

The S.H.I.E.L.D. agents go undercover to protect the future president, believing the Chronicoms will target him since he will found S.H.I.E.L.D.'s predecessor, the Strategic Scientific Reserve (SSR), in the 1940s. However, when Simmons overloads the captive Chronicom's mind, she forces it to reveal their actual target: Koenig's employee, Wilfred "Freddy" Malick, father of future Hydra leader, Gideon Malick. Realizing that they have to save Hydra to ensure S.H.I.E.L.D.'s future, the team rescues Freddy from the Chronicoms just after he received a job to deliver a package from a Hydra contact, though they get separated in the process. Aboard Zephyr One, S.H.I.E.L.D.'s Chronicom ally, Enoch, helps heal Agent Melinda May from injuries she sustained during the team's previous mission, but she wakes up earlier than expected and evades him.

== Production ==
=== Development ===
In November 2018, ahead of the release of its sixth season, ABC renewed Agents of S.H.I.E.L.D. for a seventh. Marvel Television head Jeph Loeb revealed in July 2019 that this would be the series' last season, and stated that it had been designed to "tie up any threads" and try to create a satisfying conclusion to the story. The season's story features the team trying to save the world from invasion by the Chronicoms. They used time travel to do this, allowing the season to explore the history of S.H.I.E.L.D. and "look back at everything we've done", beginning in 1930s New York prior to the formation of S.H.I.E.L.D. In August, one of the season's episodes was revealed to be titled "The New Deal" and written by George Kitson. It was confirmed to be the first episode of the season in May 2020, when Kevin Tancharoen was revealed to have directed it.

=== Writing ===
The episode picks up from the sixth season's cliffhanger ending, which showrunners Jed Whedon, Maurissa Tancharoen, and Jeffrey Bell, as well as the series' writers, were able to plan since the seventh season was ordered while they were working on the sixth. Whedon explained that the time travel story for the season begins in the 1930s because the writers wanted to start "back at the very origin of S.H.I.E.L.D.", and to create a challenge for the series' crew who had to reinvent the costumes and sets of the series each season. Tancharoen acknowledged that the period setting created "something for every department to sink their teeth into" despite there being no increase to the series' budget for the final season. The episode introduces the season's rules for time travel with the mantra "let's make ripples, not waves", and also sets up a twist where the characters have to save Hydra in order to save S.H.I.E.L.D. The latter was devised as complex moral decision for the agents to debate that would create conflict within the team. Bell compared the decision to the question of would one kill baby Adolf Hitler if they could. The episode also introduces a theme of exploring reactions to the series' diverse cast in past time periods.

Darren Barnet was not familiar with the series, which he felt helped in his portrayal of Freddy Malick, because Freddy "has no clue to what's going on", but did watch the season three episodes featuring Gideon Malick. Barnet also listened to music from the 1930s and 1940s, particularly of his grandfather, Charlie Barnet, who was a musician in the 1930s in New York City, and old radio interviews to help him with his New York accent, which he "tweaked" a little. He described Freddy as "a kid who's been dealt a bad hand and he's on this interesting cusp of deciding if he's going to be good or bad", which the actor felt was an interesting character arc to portray.

=== Casting ===
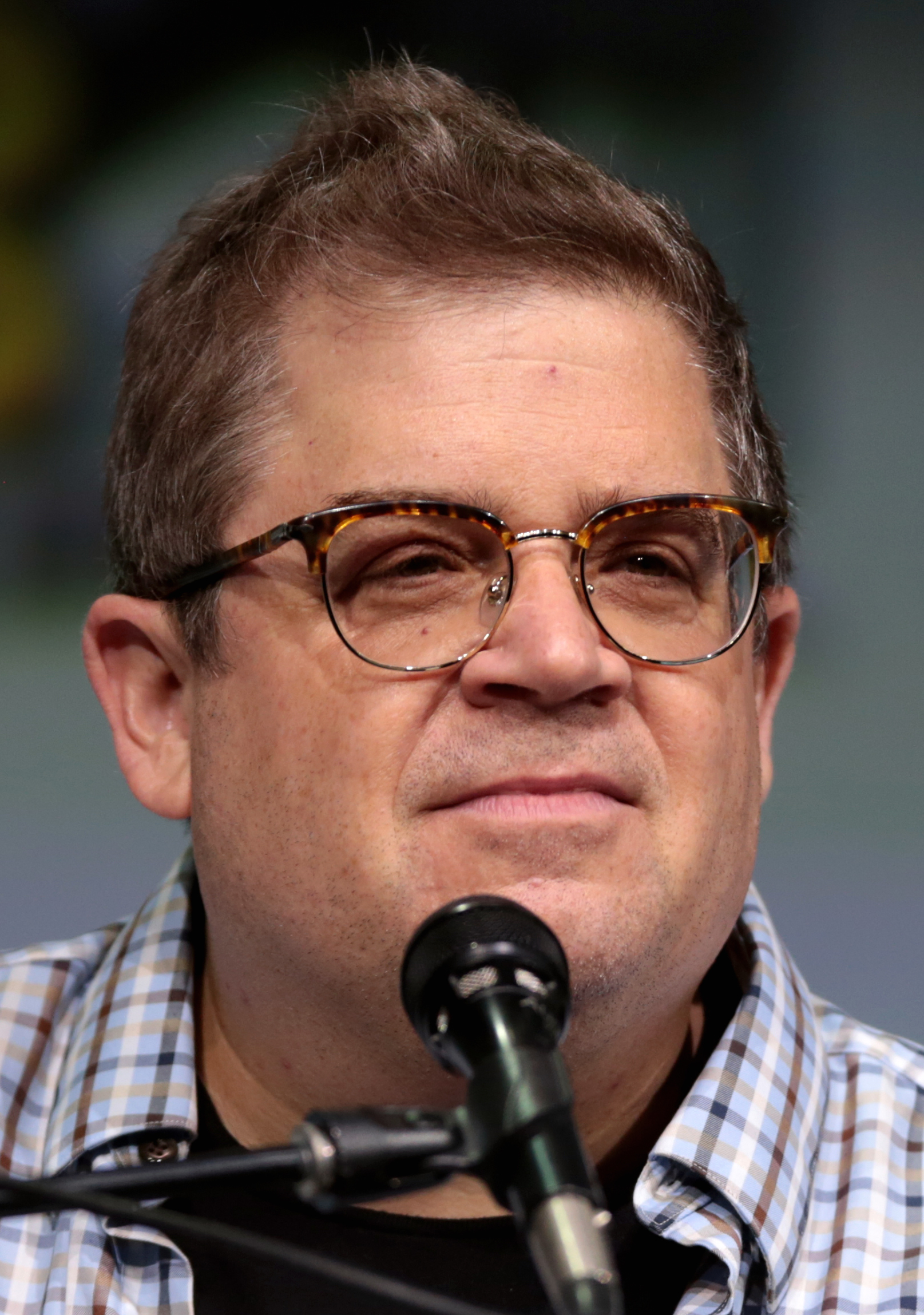
Guest star Patton Oswalt portrays a new member of the Koenig family in this episode, Ernest Hazard

With the season renewal, main cast members Ming-Na Wen, Chloe Bennet, Elizabeth Henstridge, Henry Simmons, Natalia Cordova-Buckley, and Jeff Ward were confirmed to be returning from previous seasons as Melinda May, Daisy Johnson / Quake, Jemma Simmons, Alphonso "Mack" Mackenzie, Elena "Yo-Yo" Rodriguez, and Deke Shaw, respectively. Series star Clark Gregg also returns as his character Phil Coulson, portraying a Life Model Decoy version of the character in the seventh season.

In May 2020, Patton Oswalt was revealed to be returning for the season, portraying Ernest "Hazard" Koening. He previously played various present-day Koenig siblings in previous seasons of the series. Also in May, Darren Barnet was revealed to be guest starring in the season, portraying Wilfred "Freddy" Malick, the father of Gideon Malick who was portrayed by Powers Boothe in previous seasons. Barnet originally auditioned to play one of the cops in the episode, before being called back to read for Freddy and ultimately got cast in the role. Joel Stoffer was also confirmed to be reprising his recurring role of Enoch in the seventh season. They guest star alongside Tobias Jelinek as police captain William Dole and Luke, Joe Reegan as a Chronicom, Nora Zehetner as Freddy's contact, Greg Finley as Tillman, and Luke Baines as Luke. Additionally, Joseph Culp appears in the episode as Franklin D. Roosevelt.

=== Design ===
==== Costumes ====
Costume designer Whitney Galitz did extensive research on 1930s clothing for the season, using material from her college studies as well as photographs and other primary references. She felt this research was often overlooked by other television series designing period costumes on a limited schedule. Galitz wanted to ensure that the costumes were appropriate to the period, including authentically portraying vintage police uniforms, and that they were worn as they would have been at the time (down to the correct underwear). Imogene Chayes of Marvel's Visual Development group provided concept art for the costumes. The opening scenes of the episode required almost 200 different costumes for background actors, and the series' costume department had two weeks to design and create these. Galitz had dedicated teams working on the background actors for the opening exterior scenes, and Franklin D. Roosevelt's event. Due to the large number of costumes, High Society Custom Tailor provided custom suits that the series' in-house tailor was unable to make, and Galitz worked with Western Costume for the vintage police uniforms. She also had to source 60 period black tuxedos for the FDR event, which she called "pretty difficult", since many they found were either deteriorating or did not fit modern-day sizing standards. Johnson's purple dress and green gown were custom made, as were many of the other costumes used in the various stunt sequences since vintage pieces would have been difficult to find multiple of. Galitz estimated that 50 costumes were built for this episode and for the next episode, "Know Your Onions".

Yo-Yo Rodriguez continues to wear pants in the episode rather than dresses or skirts, a decision that was made by Cordova-Buckley and the wardrobe department. This was part practical and part staying true to the style of the character, with Cordova-Buckley saying, "There's a very modern woman in that [choice.] It's never about looking pretty... It's always about, 'This is who I am, and this is how I can be the best version of who I am.'" Despite this, the character does wear high heels rather than her normal boots since the latter would have exposed the team. Barnet was originally given hightop shoes to wear, but he suggested boots as an alternative, and ended up with "big, thick boots with steel plates on the bottoms".

==== Hair ====
Head of hair and makeup Shay Sanford used the break between the end of season six filming and starting on season seven to prepare for the 1930s setting, "just to see what the vibe" of the era was. When work on the episode began in earnest, Sanford was concerned about many of the actors having long hair, since that was not a style in the 1930s. Sanford described women of the era as becoming "more vibrant looking" because of the advent of feature films and the end of the Great Depression, and wanted the actors to look this part, while hiding the length of their hair. To achieve this, Sanford used a mixture of braiding and curling to "anchor everything together". Since many of the background actors also had long hair, Sanford used "cheaper" wigs to hide their hair. Oswalt was given a side part for his hairstyle, along with a small tooth comb to style his hair. Sanford said giving men a side part "changes everything", sometimes avoiding the need for a hair cut.

==== Title sequence ====
The episode introduces a new "old-style noir" title card with a cursive, angled font, reflecting the 1930s setting of the episode. It also includes "Marvel Presents" above the logo, and the copyright boilerplate with Roman numerals below it, resembling older film titles. Ian Cardona of Comic Book Resources called the title card "a perfect throwback" given the setting of the episode, and combined with the episode's music it "lets viewers know, right off the bat, what type of aesthetic this new season will adhere to". He also noted that in addition to being an old film reference, the inclusion of "Marvel Presents" was an homage to Marvel Comics that often feature a title page stating 'Marvel Comics Presents'".

=== Filming and visual effects ===
Production for the season began at the end of February 2019, in Culver City, California. The day before filming began, actor Jeff Ward broke his toe and for three weeks until it healed he wore modern running shoes with his 1930s costume whenever his feet were not on camera. Scenes on the streets of New York City were filmed on the Warner Bros. backlot in Burbank, California, with visual effects vendor Digital Domain extending the set by adding the skyline of 1930s New York as well as digital cars and crowds in the background. The time-traveling aircraft Zephyr One was created digitally by FuseFX, while CoSA VFX provided the effects for the Chronicom's face scanning device and the body repair machine that Enoch uses on the injured Agent May. The faceless police officers were primarily created with practical makeup, though visual effects were used to blend the seems, remove eye holes, and flatten the actors' noses. The melting effect on the captured Chronicom was created by CoSA VFX using practical elements filmed by the series' special effects team, and was designed to look like spontaneous human combustion. The appearance of Chronicoms without human faces was created by CoSA VFX based on the small view inside Enoch's face from earlier in the series. Their eyes were designed as an homage to the character Lucifer in the television series of the same name.

=== Music ===
Beginning with this episode, Jason Akers is credited as co-composer alongside Bear McCreary. Akers had contributed additional music to earlier seasons, and McCreary said he "knew the show like an encyclopedia". The pair were able to introduce a new style of music with the episode due to its period setting, which McCreary described as "1940's noire saxophones" which were blended with the series' "pre-established classic orchestra and contemporary electronics" and existing musical themes.

== Release ==
"The New Deal" was first aired in the United States on ABC on May 27, 2020, following a broadcast of the MCU film Thor: The Dark World (2013).

== Reception ==
=== Ratings ===
In the United States the episode received a 0.3 percent share among adults between the ages of 18 and 49, meaning that it was seen by 0.3 percent of all households in that demographic. It was watched by 1.82 million viewers, steady with the average number of viewers for the sixth season. Within a week of its release, "The New Deal" was watched by 2.97 million U.S. viewers.

=== Critical response ===
Writing for The A.V. Club, Alex McLevy praised the episode and graded it an "A−", feeling that it did "everything right". He highlighted the story, pacing, and direction, especially commending the series for not trying to catch up new viewers given how much exposition would be required to explain the events of the previous seasons. He was positive of the characters and their interactions, praising Gregg in particular with his return as a version of Coulson after playing a different character in the previous season. McLevy also felt that one of the series' biggest issues, its "dull visual palette", was not an issue in the episode due to the execution of its period setting. Matt Fowler at IGN gave the episode a "good" score of 7 out of 10, describing it as a "fun and charming adventure" but also "more dopey than dangerous", highlighting the period setting and the main cast's chemistry. Writing for Bam! Smack! Pow!, Wesley Coburn gave the episode an "A", calling it "a winner" and "a strong start to this season's time-traveling adventures".

Syfy Wire's Trent Moore called the Hydra threat "full circle" for the series, "considering just how many seasons they spent trying to stop Hydra", and enjoyed the twist of needing to save Freddy Malick. Christian Houlb of Entertainment Weekly gave the episode a "B", highlighting the period costumes and Oswalt's appearance. Michael Ahr at Den of Geek scored the episode 4.5 out of 5 stars, feeling that the series was more comfortable in the episode than it had been in the sixth season despite the new period setting, and attributing this to Gregg's familiar performance as the LMD Coulson. He also praised the episode's explanation of the series' time travel rules, the inclusion of the Freddy Malick character tying the episode to previous seasons, and the return of Oswalt. At Hypable, Michal Schick praised the episode as "impactful" without losing the series' sense of humor. He focused on the lighthearted LMD Coulson, the scenes of the main characters not fitting in with the prejudices of 1930s New York, and the moral questions established for the rest of the season to answer.

=== Accolades ===
Clark Gregg was named as an honorable mention for TVLine's "Performer of the Week" for the week of May 24, 2020, for his performance in this episode.
