= Know Your Onions =

- Agents of S.H.I.E.L.D. episode
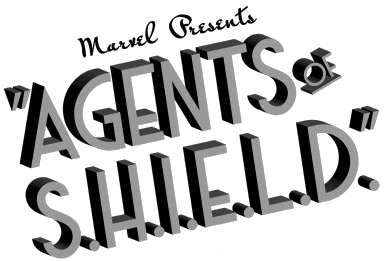
- Title card for the episode, once again featuring a 1930s-styled logo and font as first introduced in the previous episode, "The New Deal"
- Episode no.: Season 7 Episode 2
- Directed by: Eric Laneuville
- Written by: Craig Titley
- Cinematography by: Kyle Jewell
- Editing by: Dexter Adriano
- Original air date: June 3, 2020
- Running time: 42 minutes

Guest appearances
- Joel Stoffer as Enoch; Tobias Jelinek as Luke; Darren Barnet as Wilfred "Freddy" Malick; Nora Zehetner as Viola; Patton Oswalt as Ernest "Hazard" Koenig

Episode chronology
← Previous "The New Deal"	Next → "Alien Commies from the Future!"
- Agents of S.H.I.E.L.D. season 7

"Know Your Onions" is the second episode of the seventh season of the American television series Agents of S.H.I.E.L.D. Based on the Marvel Comics organization S.H.I.E.L.D., it follows a Life Model Decoy (LMD) of Phil Coulson and his team of S.H.I.E.L.D. agents as they race to stop the Chronicoms from unraveling history in 1931. It is set in the Marvel Cinematic Universe (MCU) and acknowledges the franchise's films. The episode was written by Craig Titley and directed by Eric Laneuville.

Clark Gregg reprises his role as Coulson from the film series, starring alongside Ming-Na Wen, Chloe Bennet, Elizabeth Henstridge, Henry Simmons, Natalia Cordova-Buckley, and Jeff Ward. The episode continues the 1930s setting of the season premiere with guest stars Patton Oswalt and Darren Barnet also returning from that episode. It features an early version of the super soldier serum from the MCU film Captain America: The First Avenger (2011), and includes references to several characters from that film.

"Know Your Onions" originally aired on ABC on June 3, 2020, and was watched by 1.50 million viewers. The episode received less positive reviews than the previous one, with critics highlighting several contrivances in the story and the disappointing end to the episode's central dilemma of whether to defeat Hydra or allow S.H.I.E.L.D. to be formed.

== Plot ==
Following the events of "The New Deal", S.H.I.E.L.D. Director Alphonso "Mack" Mackenzie and Agent Deke Shaw convince Wilfred "Freddy" Malick to let them protect him from the Chronicoms while he delivers the package he received so they can maintain history. Meanwhile, Agents Phil Coulson, Daisy Johnson, and Jemma Simmons regroup at Ernest "Hazard" Koenig's speakeasy so they can interrogate Malick's contact, Viola; learning she is an agent of Hydra and that Malick is delivering what will become the organization's super soldier serum. Due to Malick's involvement and having deduced where he is going, Koenig insists that the S.H.I.E.L.D. agents let him come with them, so they reluctantly bring him to their mobile headquarters, Zephyr One, just as their ally Enoch attempts to prevent an erratic Agent Melinda May from leaving. Coulson talks her down, but she responds apathetically to his being an LMD, much to the others' concerns. Koenig helps direct the team to Malick's delivery location, learning of S.H.I.E.L.D., robotics, and time travel in the process.

Once they are within communication range, Johnson tries to tell Shaw to kill Malick to prevent Hydra's rise in the future, but Mack orders him not to. Shaw ultimately spares Malick's life just as a group of Chronicoms attack them. The S.H.I.E.L.D. agents fight them off while Koenig and Enoch find Malick so the former can convince him not to make the delivery. Malick shoots his boss in the arm and leaves with a Hydra agent, securing their future as the Chronicoms are forced to leave due to a closing time window. Due to Zephyr One's time drive, the agents unexpectedly jump through time in order to follow the Chronicoms, leaving Enoch behind. Despite this, a recovering Koenig hires him to become his new bartender in exchange for information on how he, his speakeasy, and his descendants will go on to help S.H.I.E.L.D. in the future.

== Production ==
=== Development ===
After the sixth season finale of Agents of S.H.I.E.L.D. aired in August 2019, showrunners Jed Whedon, Maurissa Tancharoen, and Jeffrey Bell revealed that the seventh season would feature the team trying to save the world from invasion by the Chronicoms. They used time travel to do this, allowing the season to explore the history of S.H.I.E.L.D., beginning in 1930s New York prior to the formation of S.H.I.E.L.D. Later that month, one of the season's episodes was revealed to be titled "Know Your Onions" and written by Craig Titley. It was confirmed to be the second episode of the season in May 2020, when Eric Laneuville was revealed to have directed it.

=== Writing ===
The episode picks up from the end of the season premiere, which set up a twist where the characters have to save Hydra in order to save S.H.I.E.L.D. This was devised as complex moral decision for the agents to debate that would create conflict within the team. Bell compared the decision to the question of would one kill baby Adolf Hitler, if they could. Star Clark Gregg felt this was an interesting idea for the series to explore, saying, "Removing the challenge that makes S.H.I.E.L.D. become what it is, does put us in a funny position, but I think it's a great idea and I'm excited too for people to see the way it plays out." Darren Barnet, who portrays Freddy Malick, described "Know Your Onions" as "more my episode" following his introduction in the previous episode. Shaw has to directly deal with the dilemma of killing the character Malick to prevent Hydra from forming, or letting him live to ensure that S.H.I.E.L.D. is formed. Coincidentally, actor Jeff Ward was studying the "Baby Hitler conundrum" in an online Yale University course about morality at the same time as he was working on the episode. He described the situation as "all theory. There isn't a hard and fast answer for it until you're dealing with the repercussions of your actions." Patton Oswalt ends the episode with the line "Enoch, this looks like the start of a marvelous friendship." This is a reference to a similar line in Casablanca (1942) that Oswalt ad-libbed on set.

Titley used an online dictionary that had phrases from the 1920s and 1930s to help with the dialogue in the episode. Regarding the phrase "know your onions", it made Titley laugh, and he thought it "sounded like what was happening in the story". Regarding the erratic nature of Melinda May, Titley said the writers knew she would be hypersensitive to emotions as revealed later in the season but they "didn't want to come out of the gate with that" and make it a process, so she is shown in her "adjustment phase", having a colder personality than usual. This was justified because much of May's interaction was with the Chronicom Enoch, who does not exhibit emotions for her to read.

=== Casting ===
With the season renewal, main cast members Ming-Na Wen, Chloe Bennet, Elizabeth Henstridge, Henry Simmons, Natalia Cordova-Buckley, and Jeff Ward were confirmed to be returning from previous seasons as Melinda May, Daisy Johnson / Quake, Jemma Simmons, Alphonso "Mack" Mackenzie, Elena "Yo-Yo" Rodriguez, and Deke Shaw, respectively. Series star Clark Gregg also returns as his character Phil Coulson, portraying a Life Model Decoy version of the character in the seventh season.

Guest stars in the episode include Joel Stoffer as Enoch, Tobias Jelinek as Luke, Darren Barnet as Wilfred "Freddy" Malick, Nora Zehetner as Viola, and Patton Oswalt as Ernest "Hazard" Koening; all return from the previous episode.

=== Design ===
Like the season premiere, "Know Your Onions" again features a film noir-styled title card to reflect the 1930s setting. Costume designer Whitney Galitz called Deke's costume in the episode the most complicated, eventually giving him a brown leather jacket that Galitz and Ward felt was perfect for the character. The jacket was vintage, and Galitz thought it would work for this episode and the previous, unaware that Ward would have stunt sequences in this episode. As such, Galitz reached out to a leather worker to create a replica that Ward could wear during his stunts.

=== Marvel Cinematic Universe tie-ins ===
The vial of green liquid that Malick is tasked with delivering for Hydra in the episode is revealed to be part of the formula for the super soldier serum created by German scientist Abraham Erskine and first used by Hydra's leader, Johann Schmidt / Red Skull. These characters and events are depicted in the MCU film Captain America: The First Avenger (2011). When Malick survives the episode and successfully delivers the vial to Hydra, the events of the film are able to take place unaltered in the timeline.

== Release ==
"Know Your Onions" was first aired in the United States on ABC on June 3, 2020.

== Reception ==
=== Ratings ===
In the United States the episode received a 0.3 percent share among adults between the ages of 18 and 49, meaning that it was seen by 0.3 percent of all households in that demographic. It was watched by 1.50 million viewers. Both metrics were roughly even with the previous episode's ratings share and viewership performance. Within a week of release, "Know Your Onions" was watch by 2.53 million viewers.

=== Critical response ===
Reviewing the episode for The A.V. Club, Alex McLevy gave it a "B−", describing it as "entertaining but somewhat messy". He felt Koenig and Enoch had the best dialogue of the episode, and also felt the scenes Shaw and Mack on the train with Malick were effective. McLevy would have liked the season to explore the 1930s setting more rather than the quick wrap-up in this episode which led to several "large elements falling apart". These included Simmons finding some of the super soldier serum on the Hydra agent's shoe, and Johnson telling Shaw to kill Malick which McLevy felt was out of character for her. On that point, he concluded that "the whole moral dilemma of whether to protect Malick or take him down felt forced and clunky, with one side the obvious right choice." Michael Ahr at Den of Geek gave the episode 3.5 out of 5 stars, also feeling that Johnson's choice was out of character but praising the MCU connections, action sequences, and time travel elements. Ahr felt those points made up for the episode's "moral and psychological conundrums" that made the episode less exciting than others, along with the train scenes which he felt were repetitive. Both McLevy and Ahr noted that the scenes with May and Yo-Yo appeared to be setting up future stories for them and hoped that those would not be dragged out much longer.

Writing for Bam! Smack! Pow!, Wesley Coburn gave the episode a "B−", saying the episode "mostly served as filler to really get the characters into position for their first main action of the story". Syfy Wire's Trent Moore felt the episode had "big twists [and] wild action" and felt knowing the liquid Malick was carrying would eventually lead to the super soldier serum that creates Captain America raised some "really fun questions about time travel." Michal Schick of Hypable thought the episode was fun, particularly highlighting the period costumes, but said it was "pretty rough around the edges". Schick criticized the lack of explanation for the team having to time travel at the end of the episode, and found the conclusion to the Malick dilemma disappointing. He did think the scenes between May and Enoch in the episode were "painful but delightful".
