= Bunker (2022 film) =

2022 film by Adrian Langley

- Poster
- Directed by: Adrian Langley
- Written by: Michael Huntsman
- Produced by: James Huntsman; Patrick Rizzotti
- Starring: Roger Clark; Luke Baines; Patrick Moltane; Kayla Radomski; Julian Feder
- Cinematography: Matthew Quinn
- Edited by: Evan Pease
- Music by: Andrew Morgan Smith
- Production company: Buffalo FilmWorks
- Distributed by: Blue Fox Entertainment
- Release dates: October 8, 2022 (Buffalo International Film Festival); February 24, 2023 (U.S.)
- Running time: 108 minutes
- Country: United States
- Language: English
- Box office: $101,045

Bunker is a 2022 horror thriller film directed by Adrian Langley and written by Michael Huntsman. The film stars Roger Clark, Luke Baines, Patrick Moltane, Kayla Radomski and Julian Feder.

== Plot ==
During World War I, Lieutenant Turner commands a battalion including British soldiers Corporal Miller, Private Lewis, Captain Hall, and Corporal Walker. The young American soldier Private Baker struggles to adjust to the front. Private Segura, a medic, joins the group. While they are engaged in extended conflict with the opposing German camp, another British officer visits the battalion to assess their morale and performance. Turner refuses to admit any problems with the soldiers' morale.

When a lookout reports that the opposing German encampment has gone dark, suggesting the soldiers have retreated, Turner seizes the opportunity. He commands an advance party from the battalion to cross no man's land and take the outpost. During the advance, Baker is grabbed by a German soldier who begs him for help. Corporal Walker tells Baker to silence the man, and at his urging, Baker stabs him to death. The men eventually enter the German encampment after passing many mutilated bodies of German soldiers. As they search for enemies, they discover a door that has been sealed from the outside. They break it down and descend into a bunker. Inside the bunker they discover a surviving German soldier who has been affixed to a cross. The battalion is unable to learn anything before shelling causes the bunker to partially collapse. Private Gray is crushed under rubble despite Lewis' attempt to save him. The group retreats from the following gas attack and Turner, Baker, Segura, Walker, Lewis and the German soldier manage to survive by using gas masks stored in the bunker.

Under Lieutenant Turner's orders, the battalion attempts to dig their way out of the collapsed bunker, communicate through the radio for rescue, and interrogate the German soldier. Segura develops a rapport with the German, learning that his name is Kurt. Lewis keeps radioing what he assumes is an ally, but is unable to communicate the gravity of the situation to effect a rescue. Walker, who had been injured in the initial collapse, regains consciousness and begins to self-mutilate in a trance before Lewis stops him. A short time later, Walker once again enters a strange trance and attacks both Lewis and Baker. The battalion is forced to restrain him, but while they attempt to calm him, Walker vomits unidentified white liquid and a mass of viscera. After this, Turner begins to show erratic behavior and an increasing desire for control. Under the influence of the communication coming through the radio, Lewis starts displaying signs of religious delusions of grandeur. Segura and Baker develop an alliance while continuing to dig upwards with Kurt. During this process, they also find that all the cans of rations inside the bunker are full of the same strange viscera and white slime that Walker vomited earlier.

As conflict amongst the soldiers escalates, Lewis attacks Turner while holding a grenade. Baker attempts to replace the pin, but in the ensuing struggle Lewis is killed and Baker's hand is mutilated. Segura grows increasingly suspicious of the entity communicating with them through the radio. Finally, he realizes that the entity is not an ally and in fact intends to keep them in the bunker. Kurt explains that he is the "sacrificial lamb" of the entity, which he calls "The Angel of War". The entity feeds on their despair and violence and uses Kurt as a physical vessel.

Segura is ultimately forced to kill Turner, who has been wholly corrupted by the entity. He escapes the bunker and secures Baker's rescue by Allied medics. When he returns to the bunker to save Kurt as well, the entity emerges from Kurt's wound and draws Segura into a nightmarish vision. Segura fights to escape the vision and sacrifices himself by detonating another explosion in the bunker, sealing himself and the evil entity inside.

== Cast ==
- Eddie Ramos as Pvt. Segura
- Patrick Moltane as Lt. Turner
- Roger Clark as Cpl. Miller
- Luke Baines as Kurt
- Julian Feder as Pvt. Baker
- Quinn Moran as Pvt. Lewis
- Adriano Gatto as Cpl. Walker/Lance
- Mike Mihm as Pvt. Gray
- Sean Cullen as Captain Hall
- Sam Huntsman as. German Soldier
- Kayla Radomski as The Griever

== Production ==
Adrian Langley directed, Michael Huntsman is the screenwriter and both Jame Huntsman and Patrick Rizzotti produced the film.

== Release ==
The film premiered October 8, 2022, at Buffalo International Film Festival.

== Critical reception ==
On the review aggregator website Rotten Tomatoes, 13% of 8 critics' reviews are positive, with an average rating of 5.7/10.

Bobby LePire at Film Threat awarded it 8 out of 10, Jonathan Hickman at Newnan Times-Herald gave it a 7 out of 10 while Roger Moore at Movie Nation scored in 1 out of 4.
