= Turnbridge Equities =

Real estate company

- Type: Private
- Industry: Real estate
- Founded: 2015
- Headquarters: 4 Bryant Park Suite 200; New York, NY 10018; U.S.
- Key people: Andrew Joblon (Managing Principal); Ryan Nelson (Managing Principal)
- Website: turnbridgeeq.com

Turnbridge Equities is a privately held, Manhattan-based real estate investment company. The firm has a US$2 billion portfolio of development projects for various types of properties in the United States and is considered "asset class-agnostic". Turnbridge began construction on a 1.3 million square foot logistics center, one of the largest industrial projects in New York City in 2021. Turnbridge was founded in 2015 by Andrew Joblon, who worked for another New York real estate firm, Fisher Brothers.

== Projects ==
The company's first deal involved vacating 17 retail tenants and securing zoning incentives for a city block in Miami Beach. The area was later sold to Michael D. Fascitelli and Dreamscape Companies CEO Eric Birnbaum (co-owner of the Rio Las Vegas), who also built the Goodtime Hotel with an investment from David Grutman.

In June 2018, Turnbridge Equities and Harbor Group International (HGI) entered an agreement to ground lease a 90,000 square foot warehouse at 2300 Linden Boulevard in New York, in close proximity to the JFK airport. The warehouse was later leased by Amazon, who used the location as a delivery station. HGI sold their interest in the warehouse to BentallGreenOak, a real estate investment firm, in 2021.

In January 2019, Turnbridge Equities announced the purchase of the Cary Towne Center shopping mall for $31.5 million. The mall was renovated and later sold to Epic Games for $95 million, with plans for the space to become the company's headquarters. Turnbridge was also part of the team that acquired the Ballantine Industrial Center, which is the site of the former Ballantine Brewery, one of the oldest brands of beer in the United States.

The company acquired the rights to a $33.6 million loan in 2020 that was applied to buildings in the South Congress neighborhood. That same year, it acquired The Creamery in Raleigh, North Carolina for $34.7 million. The property dates back to the 1920s and was the former dairy products factory, Pine State Creamery.

Turnbridge Equities completed a $500 million recapitalization deal on Music Lane, an Austin, Texas based commercial strip containing businesses such as Hermès, Soho House, Brevan Howard, and Deloitte, in 2022. Later that year, it was reported that Turnbridge and Fundamental Advisors LP sold the Northern-Virginia based office portfolio for $220 million to an undisclosed buyer. The leased tenants of the buildings included cyberspace and defense infrastructure companies such as Lockheed Martin, General Dynamics, Boeing, and Northrop Grumman. In September 2022, an agreement was reached between Turnbridge and the Raleigh City Council, allowing for the rezoning of the historic Seaboard Station property in North Carolina. The Seaboard Station was Raleigh's central train station for decades prior and dates back to 1942. Turnbridge initially sought to demolish the station, which never received a historical landmark designation. In exchange for preserving at least 50 percent of the station either relocated or on-site, Turnbridge is able to build up to 20 stories on the property.

It received approval from the City of Long Beach to redevelop a closed shopping mall into residential apartments in April 2023. In a joint venture with Manekin, Turnbridge Equities secured $275 million to develop the National Capital Business Park in Upper Marlboro, Maryland. The $165 million construction loan was through Apollo Global Management and $110 million in equity from Qatar Investment Authority and PCCP. The property was acquired in March 2021.
