= The Girl in the Photographs =

- Theatrical release poster
- Directed by: Nick Simon
- Written by: Nick Simon; Oz Perkins; Robert Morast
- Produced by: Andrea Chung; Thomas Mahoney; Wes Craven
- Starring: Kal Penn; Claudia Lee; Kenny Wormald; Toby Hemingway; Miranda Rae Mayo; Luke Baines; Christy Carlson Romano; Katharine Isabelle; Mitch Pileggi
- Cinematography: Dean Cundey
- Edited by: Michael Griffin
- Music by: Nima Fakhrara
- Distributed by: Vertical Entertainment
- Release dates: September 14, 2015 (TIFF); April 1, 2016 (United States)
- Running time: 95 minutes
- Country: United States
- Language: English

The Girl in the Photographs is a 2015 American horror thriller film co-written and directed by Nick Simon and executive produced by Wes Craven. The film stars Kal Penn, Claudia Lee, Kenny Wormald, Miranda Rae Mayo, Luke Baines, Christy Carlson Romano, Katharine Isabelle, and Mitch Pileggi. Filming began in April 2015 in Victoria, British Columbia. It was an official selection at Toronto International Film Festival 2015 in the Midnight Madness category. The film was released on April 1, 2016, in a limited release and through video on demand, by Vertical Entertainment.

== Plot ==
The film opens with two young women, Britney and Janet, exiting a movie theater and heading in opposite directions. Janet heads to her car in a dark parking lot where one other truck, a blood-red Bronco, sits. As she drives off the Bronco begins following her. As she enters her home there's a man waiting. He is wearing a mask, no shirt and he attacks her. After tying her up, he meets with the second man, along with her vehicle. All the while, they're taking pictures of her.

Next, a man sits at a computer printing out a picture. Colleen is a young woman working at the local grocery store. Arriving early in the morning for work she sees a photograph stapled to the bulletin board at the front of the store. It contains a young bloodied woman, Janet, lying dead on a bed.

Later that day Colleen goes to the Sheriff's Station in Spearfish and shows them the photograph. Not believing a crime took place, they tell her to sign a statement and be on her way. She points out that this picture is labeled number 7 at the bottom.

In L.A., Peter Hemmings, a prior Spearfish resident and photographer, is reading an online blog about the same photographs. Assuming that the person taking the photographs is trying to create the "Dead Model" look, he decides to travel to Spearfish. Along with his assistant Chris, his girlfriend and model Rose, and two other models, Victoria and Trip, they head to Spearfish.

When they arrive they meet Colleen at the local grocery store, where she works, and invite her to the house they're renting for a party. Prior to her arrival she contacts her friend Jill, to meet her at the party. Unbeknownst to her, Jill was kidnapped by the two men who kidnapped the previous girl. In a cage, a man offers her a can of cat food. Angry, she refuses the food, and he goads her into trying to take her cell phone. When she reaches for it, the second man uses a belt to choke her. The first man then uses Jill's phone to text Colleen, as Jill, that she will meet her at the party.

While getting ready for the party, Colleen's boyfriend, Ben, says he wants to see her, which she refuses. After arriving at the party, Peter begins taking her photograph until she pushes him away and goes to her car. When she gets to her car she sees another photograph. The picture is of Jill, mutilated and one eyeball removed. The police arrive and say there isn't anything they can do.

Arriving home, Ben is waiting and they get into an argument. When he leaves, he gets ambushed by the men and is taken. One of the men enters Colleen's apartment, unbeknownst to her, and leaves Ben's wallet behind. Later, at work, Colleen meets one of the men, Tom. After a short conversation, she is approached by Chris and Peter. Peter offers to take her to L.A. and make her a model, the star of his new ad campaign, to which she agrees.

After heading home, she packs a few belongings and texts Ben that she's leaving town. When Tom checks Ben's phone, he sees the message and tells him his body will fit into two bags. At the house, Peter and Rose head to the hot tub, where they're attacked. Peter is viciously stabbed to death and Rose has her neck broken with a towel. Next, the two models are blinded by the flash of a camera and stabbed to death.

In the bedroom, Colleen and Chris are talking and she decides to go to bed. Chris heads downstairs and sees the front door open. After approaching the door, he sees Rose lying on the ground, covered by a towel and dead. He runs back inside calling for Peter and tries to call 911, when the power goes out. Using the flash lens from the camera as a light, he walks around the house, but Gerry approaches from behind and stabs him in the head. Upstairs, Colleen tries to leave the room, but Tom is holding the door shut. She hides under a desk until the power comes back on. After heading downstairs she sees the bodies and the two men arranging them by the couch. Tom turns and takes her picture. He also tells her that he wants her to tie her hair up for second picture. After trying to escape, she is stopped by Gerry.

In the end, we see Britney heading to work. As she's about to open the store, she sees a photograph on the front door. Chris, Peter, Rose, Ben, Victoria and Trip are all posed, while Colleen is sitting in the middle with her hair tied up.

== Cast ==
- Kal Penn as Peter Hemmings
- Claudia Lee as Colleen
- Kenny Wormald as Chris
- Toby Hemingway as Ben
- Luke Baines as Tom
- Corey Schmitt as Gerry
- Miranda Rae Mayo as Rose
- Autumn Kendrick as Victoria
- Christy Carlson Romano as Britney
- Katharine Isabelle as Janet
- Mitch Pileggi as Sheriff Porter
- Oliver Seitz as Trip

== Production ==
In January 2015, it was revealed that Al-Ghanim Entertainment would produce The Girl in The Photographs as its first project, with Wes Craven executive producing, Nick Simon, directing, and Thomas Mahoney producing. In April 2015, it was revealed that Kal Penn had been cast in the film. The Girl in the Photographs is the last film Craven produced before his death on August 30, 2015.

== Release ==
The film had its world premiere at the 2015 Toronto International Film Festival on September 14, 2015. Shortly after, Vertical Entertainment acquired distribution rights to the film. The film was released in a limited release and through video on demand on April 1, 2016.

== Reception ==
The Girl in the Photographs received mostly negative reviews from film critics. It currently holds an 17% approval rating on Rotten Tomatoes, based on 23 reviews, with an average rating of 3.5/10. On Metacritic, the film holds a rating of 35 out of 100, based on 10 critics, indicating "Generally unfavorable reviews".

Joe Leydon of Variety gave the film a negative review, writing: "Trouble is, this initially promising premise quickly devolves into an excuse for standard-issue bloodletting, and the film emerges as something best left to undiscriminating VOD streamers and niche festival attendees."

Jordan Mintzer of The Hollywood Reporter gave the film a positive review and said "[with] the hilarious Kal Penn as an unbearable L.A. hipster you’re just hoping will meet his end, this offbeat indie chiller benefits from colorful cinematography and bits of satisfying butchery, even if a less than airtight scenario fails to make it run efficiently. Following a premiere in Toronto's Midnight Madness section, a small domestic release and VOD playdates could be in store – especially with the endorsement of the late Wes Craven, credited here as executive producer."

Daniel Baldwin of Forbes also gave the film a positive review, complimenting its exploration of the invasive nature of photography, and saying: "The Girl in the Photographs is not a particularly original horror offering, but it is a very well-made one whose positive attributes outweigh its flaws. Director/writer Nick Simon (Removal) and writer Oz Perkins (The Black Coat’s Daughter) have crafted a great brutal little thriller here that has more than just stalking and slashing on its mind, offering up some good atmosphere and even great laughs in the process."
