= Luke Baines =

Australian actor

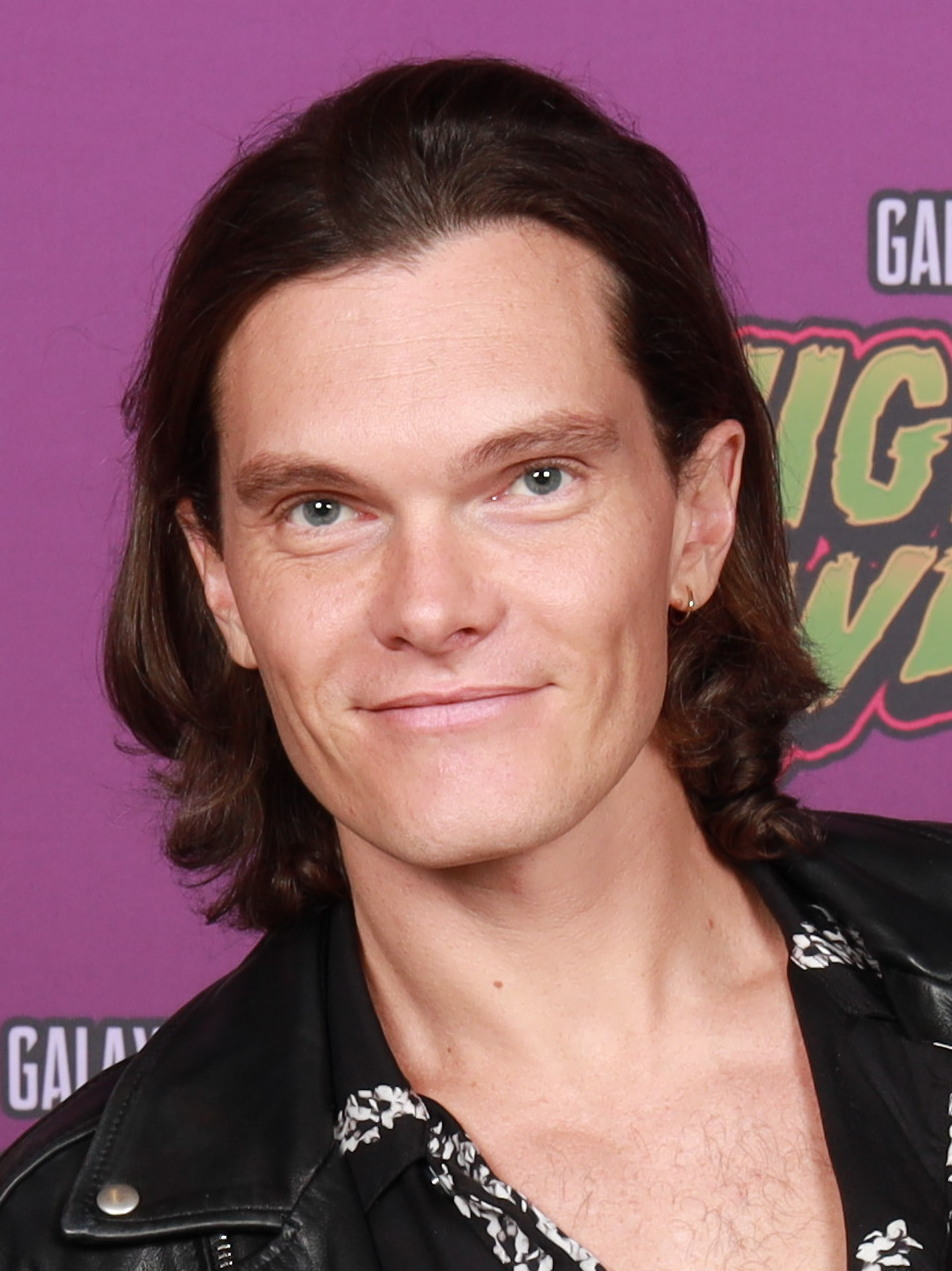
- Baines in 2025
- Born: Luke Joseph Baines; 8 June 1990 (age 36); Hyde, England
- Other name: L. J. Baines
- Education: The McDonald College, Bond University
- Occupations: Actor; writer
- Years active: 2004–present

Luke Baines (born 8 June 1990) is an English-Australian actor and author. He is best known for playing the serial killer in The Girl in the Photographs, the last film produced by Wes Craven, which opened at the 2015 Toronto International Film Festival. His major breakout role in TV was playing Jonathan Morgenstern in Shadowhunters.

== Early life ==
Born in Hyde, Greater Manchester, England, Baines grew up in the beach-side suburb of Cronulla, Sydney in Australia. He began acting lessons when he was five years old.

Baines attended The McDonald College of Performing Arts in North Strathfield, New South Wales where he studied drama, music and dance.

== Career ==
In 2008, Baines auditioned during a six-month nationwide casting search for the West End production of Spring Awakening the musical. In November of that year, he performed in the workshop at the Lyric Hammersmith in the role of Hanschen.

Notably, he appeared as a serial killer in the Wes Craven-produced film The Girl in the Photographs, which premiered in Midnight Madness at 2015 Toronto International Film Festival. The performance received critical praise from outlets such as The Wrap, The Line Up and Press Pass LA, who singled him out as a breakout star.

Baines has also appeared in Gold Circle Films' The Possession of Michael King, and Disney's Saving Mr. Banks.

In 2013, Baines starred in Richard Zelniker's As Night Comes (originally titled Mischief Night). The film follows troubled 17-year-old Sean Holloway (Myko Olivier) who falls in with a group of teenage outcasts called 'The Misfits,' whose charismatic and deeply dysfunctional leader, Ricky Gladstone (Baines), takes him under his wing.

Baines also appears in Mark Webber and Teresa Palmer's The Ever After. The independent feature stars Palmer, Weber, Melissa Leo, Phoebe Tonkin and Tahyna Tozzi. It was filmed in Los Angeles and New York between July and August 2013.

In 2016, Deadline Hollywood announced that Baines would be joining Andrew Garfield and Riley Keogh in David Robert Mitchell's Under the Silver Lake.

Baines has appeared in several TV shows, including Shadowhunters where he portrayed the reincarnated Jonathan Morgenstern, Clary's brother, in Season 3b. In 2020 he appeared as Luke, a Chronicom in one episode of Agents of S.H.I.E.L.D., and as an Imperial Shuttle Pilot in the Disney+ series The Mandalorian.

Baines co-wrote and starred in the upcoming horror comedy film Untitled Horror Movie, which was filmed remotely by the actors during the COVID-19 pandemic.

His stage highlights include Spring Awakening the Musical, Footloose the Musical and Alice's Adventures in Wonderland. As a model, he has appeared in advertisements and editorials for American Eagle, American Rag, Roark Collective and Chapter.

== Writing ==
In addition to his acting career, Baines is also a writer. Under the pen name L. J. Baines, he published his debut novel, In Scientia, in 2024 through Not From Here Entertainment. A sequel, titled In Secreta, is scheduled for release in 2026.

== Personal life ==
Baines came out as part of the LGBT+ community in June 2022. He said he was currently in a relationship with a man and previously been in a relationship with a woman.

== Filmography ==
=== Film ===
Year	Title	Role	Notes
2013	Saving Mr. Banks	Waiter	
2014	As Night Comes	Ricky Gladstone	Originally titled Mischief Night
2014	The Possession of Michael King	Elias	
2014	The Ever After	Himself	
2015	The Girl in the Photographs	Tom	
2017	Fright Fest	Mason	
2018	Under the Silver Lake	Jesus	
2018	A Dark Place	Alex	
2021	Untitled Horror Movie	Declan	Also co-writer and producer
2022	Bunker	Kurt	
2025	No Tears in Hell	Alex	
2025	Crystal Cross	TBA	

=== Television ===
Year	Title	Role	Notes
2004	The Cooks	School kid	
2016	Living on Video	David Bowie	
2017	Truth or Dare	Carter Boyle	Television film
2019	Shadowhunters	Jonathan Morgenstern	Recurring (12 episodes); Nominated – Teen Choice Award for Choice TV Villain
2020–2021	Nancy Drew	John "Mac" McDonald	Episodes: "The Girl in the Locket" & "The Reunion of Lost Souls"
2020	Agents of S.H.I.E.L.D.	Luke	Episode: "The New Deal"
2020	The Mandalorian	Jorad Mainos	Episode: "Chapter 16: The Rescue"

=== Stage ===
- 2004: The McDonald College 20th Anniversary concert
- 2004: Footloose as Ren McCormack
- 2007: Alice's Adventures in Wonderland as the Mad Hatter

== Bibliography ==
- Baines, L. J. (2024). In Scientia. Not From Here Entertainment. ISBN 9798989786213.
- Baines, L. J. (2026). In Secreta. Not From Here Entertainment. ISBN 9798989786244.
