= Claire Holt =

Australian actress (born 1988)

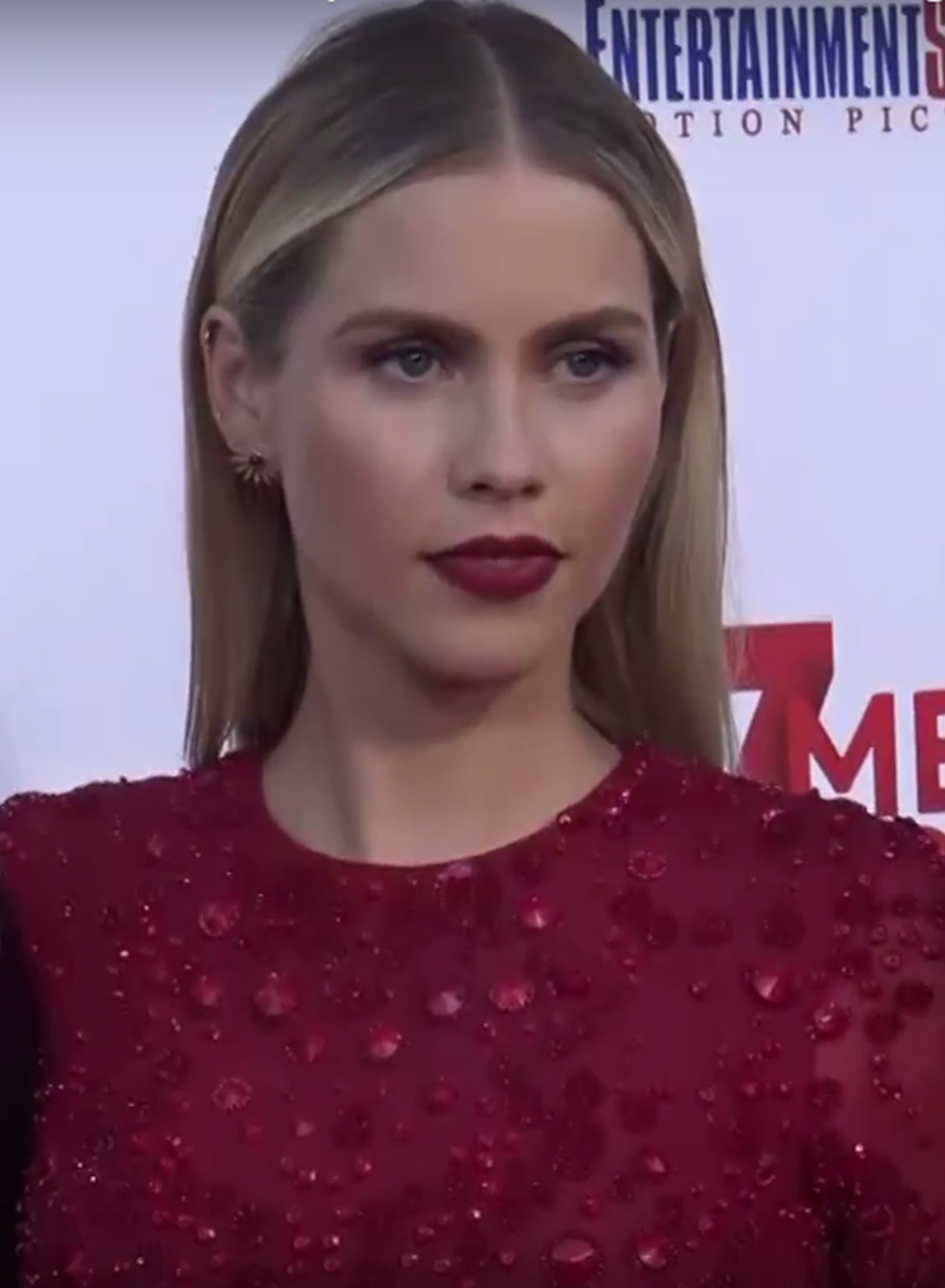
- Holt in 2017
- Born: Claire Rhiannon Holt; 11 June 1988 (age 38); Brisbane, Queensland, Australia
- Citizenship: Australia; United States
- Occupation: Actress
- Years active: 2005–present
- Spouses: Matt Kaplan (m. 2016; div. 2017); Andrew Joblon (m. 2018)
- Children: 3
- Website: thecornerbyclaire.com

Claire Rhiannon Holt (born 11 June 1988) is an Australian-American actress. She made her acting debut playing Emma Gilbert in the fantasy series H_{2}O: Just Add Water (2006–2008), before moving to the United States and making her film debut in 2009. After appearing in the television sequel Mean Girls 2 and the first two seasons of Pretty Little Liars (both 2011), she had her breakthrough playing Rebekah Mikaelson in the CW supernatural drama series The Vampire Diaries (2011–2014), The Originals (2013–2018) and Legacies (2021–2022). The role earned her acclaim and a Teen Choice Award nomination. She also starred in the NBC period crime drama series Aquarius (2015–2016), to further acclaim.

In film, Holt starred in the comedy drama Blue Like Jazz (2012) and the survival thriller 47 Meters Down (2017) to positive critical reception, followed by roles in a series of less-well-received projects, and later in the acclaimed comedy horror film Untitled Horror Movie (2021). The last of these she also executive produced.

== Early life ==
Holt was born in Brisbane, Queensland, Australia, and attended Stuartholme School.

== Career ==
=== 2000s: Breakthrough and early recognition ===
In 2005, Holt won the role of Emma Gilbert in the Network Ten fantasy television show H_{2}O: Just Add Water as her first television role. The show has earned a Logie Award and a Nickelodeon Australia Kids' Choice Award. While the series was renewed for a third season, Holt left the show after season two after signing on for the sequel to the 2007 film The Messengers, titled Messengers 2: The Scarecrow. She was replaced by Indiana Evans' character, Bella. Filming of Messengers 2 took place in Sofia throughout 2008. Starring alongside Norman Reedus and Heather Stephens, the film was released 21 July 2009 straight-to-DVD.

=== 2010s: Worldwide recognition ===
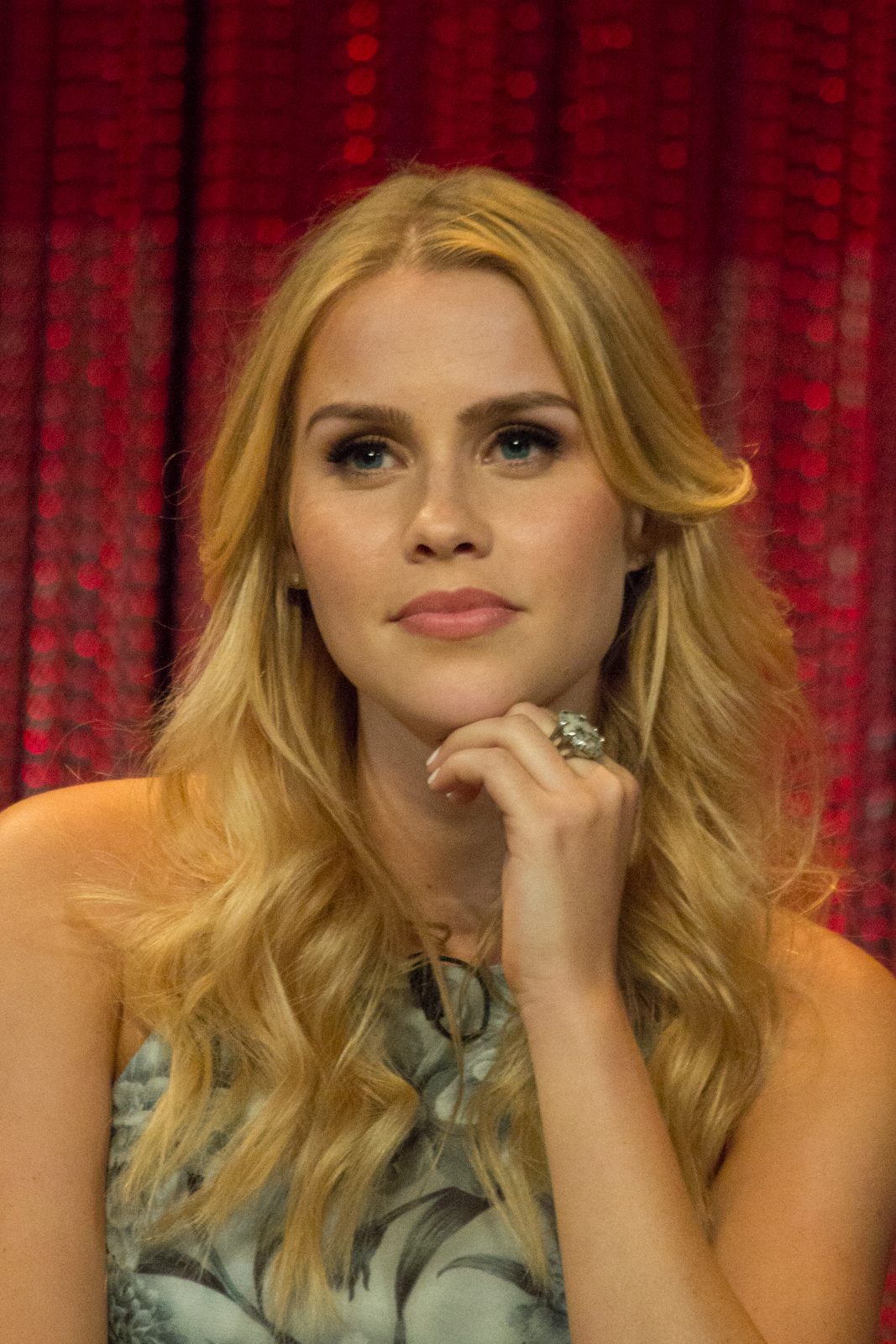
Claire Holt at The Paley Center For Media's PaleyFest 2014 Honoring "The Originals"

In addition to television and film roles, Holt has appeared in advertisements for Dreamworld, Sizzler, and Surf Life Saving Queensland. BuddyTV ranked her number 55 on its TV's 100 Sexiest Women of 2011 list.

Prior to finding success in the United States, Holt revealed that she underwent 142 auditions before booking her first roles in the country, TV movie Mean Girls 2, and a recurring role in Pretty Little Liars. Holt shared on her YouTube channel and on the "Not skinny but not fat" podcast that she had screen tested for the role of Annabeth in Percy Jackson & the Olympians: The Lightning Thief. The role eventually went to Alexandra Daddario. She has also stated that she first auditioned for the supernatural drama TV series The Secret Circle for the role of Diana, later won by Shelley Hennig, before being considered by Kevin Williamson for The Vampire Diaries.

In August 2011, Holt was confirmed to be in the TV series The Vampire Diaries as Rebekah Mikaelson. On 13 January 2013, The CW announced that Holt had joined the cast for of The Vampire Diaries spin-off The Originals, where she reprised her role as Rebekah Mikaelson. She exited the show as a series regular in the sixteenth episode of the first season, which aired in the U.S. on 11 March 2014. Holt returned to her role in the season one finale on 13 May 2014, and continued to periodically guest star on the series until its finale on 1 August 2018.

In 2014, Holt was linked to CBS' Supergirl, though she chose not to pursue it. She starred in NBC "event series" Aquarius as Charmain Tully. In 2016, she was cast in the romantic comedy The Divorce Party, playing the role of Susan. In the same year, Holt was cast in the thriller film "Wolf in the Wild", alongside Frank Grillo, although the project was never finalised.

Holt had a starring role as Kayla in the ABC thriller drama television pilot Doomsday in 2017, though ABC decided to not move forward with the production of the show. Also that year, Holt starred as Kate in the underwater survival horror film 47 Meters Down, opposite Mandy Moore and Matthew Modine, which was released in theaters on 16 June 2017.

Holt was originally set to have a role in the 2018 drama movie Irreplaceable You but she later left the project.

=== 2020s: Established actress ===
In 2021, Holt had a starring role in Untitled Horror Movie. She also collaborated with the brand Andie Swim to design a swimsuit collection. In November of the same year, she appeared in the Originals spin-off series Legacies as Rebekah Mikaelson.

In 2022, Holt appeared again in Legacies as Rebekah Mikaelson for one episode, playing the character for the last time.

In October 2024, Holt collaborated with business company VEE Collective to design her dream set of VEE bags.

In November 2024 and 2025, Holt participated in her third and fourth marathons and her second and third in New York City, in partnership with Maybelline.

In December 2025, Holt was interviewed by E! News and revealed that she is taking a break from acting to focus on raising her three children.

In Fall 2026, Holt starred in the on demand movie Art of Murder, previously known as "Painted Beauty". The project was shot in 2018.

== Other projects ==
=== Website and YouTube channel ===
In January 2023, Holt announced that she had opened a website, in which weekly she would bring content to her fans such as make-up, fashion choices, maternity issues and much more. In March 2026, Holt created a YouTube channel named after her website, where she documents various moments and phases of her life through vlogs.

=== Fashion: Saint Sirène ===
On 9 April 2026, Holt launched her first clothing brand, Saint Sirène, in collaboration with her friend Madeline Simmer. The concept originated from Holt’s personal search for a white T-shirt that met her expectations. After reaching out to friends and her Instagram audience, she gathered a range of responses highlighting common frustrations and unmet needs. Drawing on this feedback, Holt and Simmer spent a year developing the brand, focusing on three distinct cuts designed to achieve an ideal white T-shirt.

Holt and Simmer are planning to expand their clothing line in the future.

=== Advocacy ===
In November 2022, Holt decided to run the New York City Marathon to donate her fee to Boston Children's Hospital for a total of US$162,000. Holt ran for 42.2 kilometres (26.2 mi) reaching her main goal.

In October 2024, Holt ran her second marathon in Chicago, raising over US$100,000 to add to the US$250,000 she had previously raised for Boston Children's Hospital.

=== Other appearances ===
Podcast: Evergreen (2023), as Dagny Isaacs.

== Personal life ==
In July 2015, Holt became engaged to long-time boyfriend, television producer Matt Kaplan. The two were married on 28 April 2016. On 27 April 2017, Kaplan filed for divorce from Holt, citing "irreconcilable differences". Holt subsequently filed in response on 2 May 2017, also asking for her name to be changed from Kaplan back to Holt.

On 3 December 2017, Holt announced her engagement to real estate executive Andrew Joblon. On 5 March 2018, Holt revealed on Instagram that she had suffered a miscarriage. Holt and Joblon were married on 18 August 2018. They have three children: two sons (born 2019 and 2023) and a daughter (born 2020).

Holt announced that she became an American citizen in November 2019.

== Filmography ==
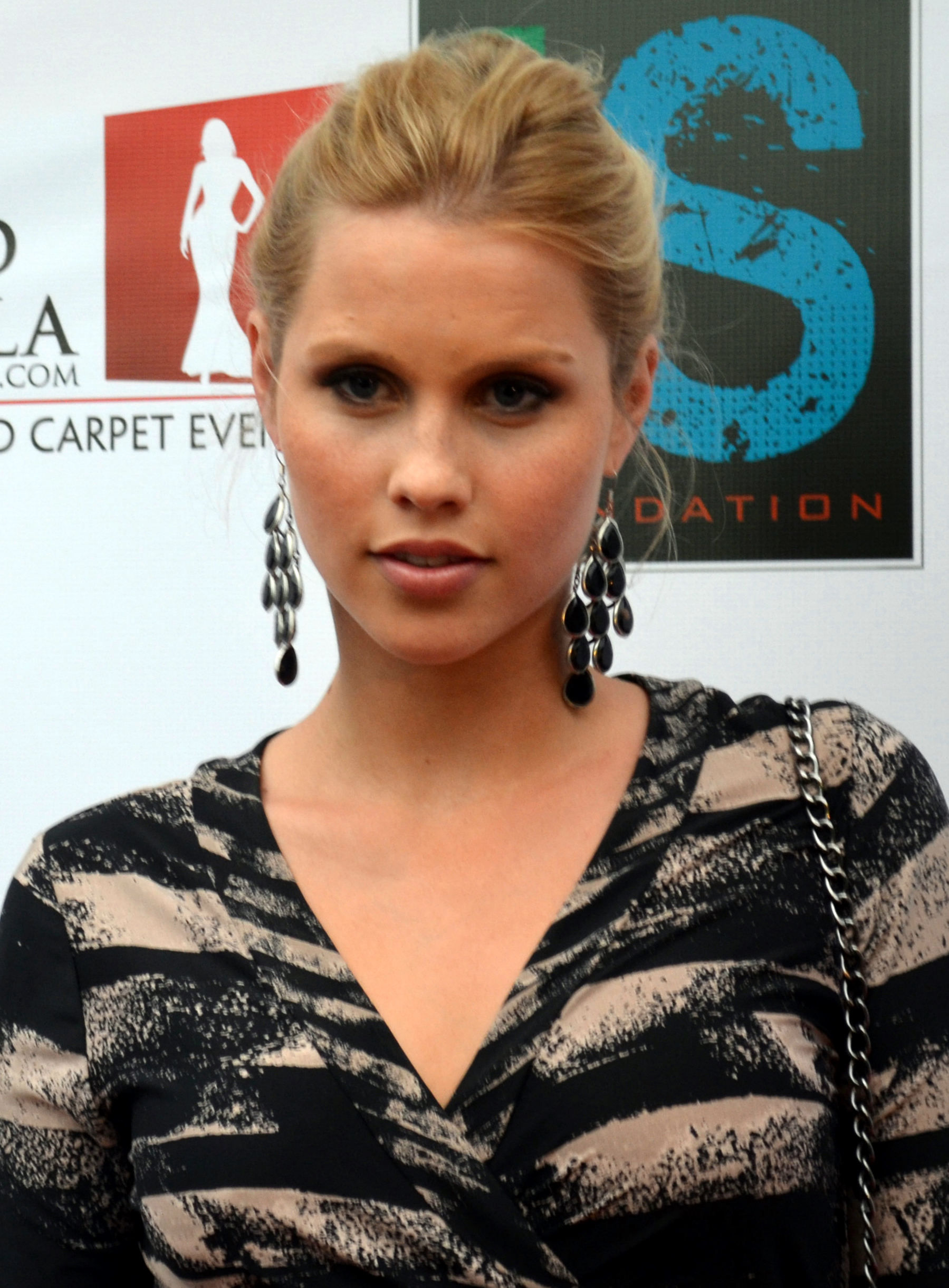
Holt at the Ian Somerhalder Foundation's Influence Affair Red Carpet 2012.

Film roles
Year	Title	Role	Notes
2009	Messengers 2: The Scarecrow	Lindsay Rollins	
2012	Blue Like Jazz	Penny	
2017	47 Meters Down	Kate	
2019	The Divorce Party	Susan Brown	
2019	A Violent Separation	Abbey Campbell	
2021	Untitled Horror Movie	Kelly	Also executive producer
2026	Art of Murder	Sasha	On demand film. Shot in 2018

Television roles
Year	Title	Role	Notes
2006–2008	H_{2}O: Just Add Water	Emma Gilbert	Main role (seasons 1–2), 51 episodes
2011	Mean Girls 2	Chastity Meyer	Television film
2011	Pretty Little Liars	Samara Cook	Guest role (season 1); recurring role (season 2); 5 episodes
2011–2014	The Vampire Diaries	Rebekah Mikaelson	Recurring role (seasons 3-4); guest role (season 5); 38 episodes
2013–2018	The Originals	Rebekah Mikaelson	Main role (season 1); recurring role (seasons 2–5); 37 episodes
2015–2016	Aquarius	Charmain Tully	Main role; 22 episodes
2021–2022	Legacies	Rebekah Mikaelson	Special guest role; 2 episodes
2023	Based on a True Story	TV writer	Episode: "Ted Bundy Bottle Opener"

Music video roles
Year	Song	Artist	Notes
2014	"We Are Done"	The Madden Brothers	
2017	"Small Town Boy"	Dustin Lynch	

== Awards and nominations ==
Year	Award	Category	Work	Result	Refs
2014	Teen Choice Awards	Choice TV Actress: Sci-Fi/Fantasy	The Originals	Nominated	
