= Untitled Horror Movie =

2021 horror comedy film

- Film poster
- Directed by: Nick Simon
- Written by: Nick Simon; Luke Baines
- Produced by: Bronwyn Cornelius; Marina Stabile
- Starring: Luke Baines; Darren Barnet; Timothy Granaderos; Claire Holt; Katherine McNamara; Emmy Raver-Lampman
- Cinematography: Kevin Duggin
- Edited by: Don Money
- Music by: Nima Fakhrara
- Production companies: Bronwyn Cornelius Productions; Spectrum Studios; Anarchy Post
- Distributed by: (Yet) Another Distribution Company
- Release dates: June 12, 2021 (livestream premiere); June 15, 2021 (VOD and digital)
- Running time: 87 minutes
- Country: United States
- Language: English

Untitled Horror Movie is a 2021 American horror comedy film directed by Nick Simon, who co-wrote the screenplay with Luke Baines. Baines also stars in the film alongside Claire Holt, Darren Barnet, Emmy Raver-Lampman, Katherine McNamara, and Timothy Granaderos. The film utilizes found footage conventions, and in one scene presents its narrative via a computer screen. Its plot follows six actors who decide to create a horror film, and in doing so unwittingly summon a malevolent spirit.

Untitled Horror Movie was filmed remotely due to the COVID-19 pandemic. The processes of writing, pre-production, and filming all took place during COVID-19-related quarantines. The film's actors—who were self-isolating at their homes during shooting—were responsible for lighting, makeup, audio and camerawork, with direction, assistance and communication taking place through Zoom.

== Plot ==
After actor Declan learns about the cancellation of the hit TV show Belle where he stars, he discloses the news to his fellow castmates: aspiring writer Kip, shallow diva Kelly, the level-headed and confident Alex, the very ditzy Chrissy and fun-loving Max. Kip wants to use the opportunity and reveals to his friends about a horror movie he has been working on. The idea of being in charge of their own movie excites them and although Kelly is initially hesitant, she later agrees on the condition that she gets to star.

The group starts working on the movie, juggling between improving Kip's terrible script and coping with Kelly's dissatisfaction. Chrissy's pendulum gives them an idea to shoot a séance and Chrissy agrees to use the pendulum during filming though she is against the idea.

Max sends some of their scenes to his manager and claims that the movie will be highly sought after, motivating them to carry on with the film. Chrissy then starts to recite the séance. In the night as they film the séance the group all feel strange things happen, such as Declan hearing thunder from his house even though it was a clear night, Kelly feeling a gust of wind blowing on her face and a shadow appearing behind Chrissy, which she claims she had no idea of. The group later noticed the same shadow in Alex's footage as well.

The next day Chrissy joins in the video call with a blackened eye, saying that she couldn't stop hitting herself the previous night even after she stopped filming. The group first rebuke it as Chrissy trying to seek attention but soon realise that strange things were going with the rest of the cast every time they try to shoot the séance scene, creeping them out enough for Kip to cancel shooting for the night.

At night, Kip wakes Alex up telling her Chrissy had uploaded a horrifying video of an anonymous person recording her while she slept. Alarmed, Kip contacts the rest of the group, but Chrissy disconnects mid-call. Declan video-calls her for the rest of the group to see that someone is indeed in Chrissy's house. Declan leaves to help her while the others watch as she tries to survive many attacks.

Declan reaches Chrissy's house in time to witness Chrissy choking herself to death after giving her pendulum to Declan. Declan flees from her house with the pendulum. A few days later Kip calls Declan telling him that Chrissy's body was found and her death was ruled an accident. The group argues whether to abandon the movie and Declan decides to throw away Chrissy's pendulum after realising that it is the source of the evil entity. However, he is later strangled to death by the same entity and is possessed.

The rest of the group, unaware of Declan's death, is invited by the creators of Belle and reveals their intention to renew it for three more seasons to honor Chrissy. One of the producers Bobbie, finds a package from Declan containing the materials for the séance and Chrissy's pendulum. After Bobbie recites the séance again, the entire group is possessed while the producers leave, convinced they were being pranked.

== Cast ==
- Claire Holt as Kelly
- Luke Baines as Declan
- Darren Barnet as Max
- Timothy Granaderos as Kip
- Katherine McNamara as Chrissy
- Emmy Raver-Lampman as Alex
- Kal Penn as Mark
- Aisha Tyler as Bobbie Brower
- Kevin Daniels as Harry
- Lesly Kahn as herself
- Sohm Kapila as Michelle

== Production ==
"The actors did everything from lighting themselves [...] to recording their own sound and doing their own hair and makeup. As crazy as that could have been, it was easily one of the most enjoyable experiences in my professional life. It was one of those once in a lifetime moments when everything aligns at the exact right time."

— director and co-writer Nick Simon on the production of Untitled Horror Movie.

Director and co-writer Nick Simon, with star and fellow co-writer Luke Baines, pitched the concept of Untitled Horror Movie to producers Bronwyn Cornelius and Marina Stabile, who helped acquire funding for the project. Cornelius stated that "We've never met the cast and crew, and yet we all absolutely bonded virtually over these Zoom calls. It's fascinating how connected you can feel to somebody having never physically met them. [...] You don't need to lose that bonding just because we can't physically be in the same space."

Untitled Horror Movie was filmed remotely as a result of the COVID-19 pandemic, with the processes of writing, pre-production, and filming all taking place during COVID-19-related quarantines. Simon and the rest of the crew sent packages containing makeup and hair supplies, camera equipment, props, and lighting equipment to the film's actors, who were each isolating at their respective homes, and explained how to set up equipment over Zoom calls. Cinematographer Kevin Duggin helped the actors rig lights and set up camera shots, while hair and makeup department head Stefanie Terzo sent the actors video tutorials on how to create artificial bruises and wounds using makeup.

One portion of the film presents the narrative through a computer screen, with the characters interacting via a video chat. The rest of the film is shot in a more traditional found footage style.

Post production on the film was expected to wrap by early September.

== Release ==
The film had its livestreamed premiere on June 12, 2021. It was made available for viewing by (Yet) Another Distribution Company on video-on-demand services and digital platforms like iTunes and Amazon.com on June 15, 2021.

== Reception ==
On the review aggregator website Rotten Tomatoes, 83% of 12 critics' reviews are positive, with an average rating of 6.90/10.

== See also ==
- Impact of the COVID-19 pandemic on cinema
