= Andrew Joblon =

American real estate executive

- Born: 20 February 1983 (age 43); Connecticut, United States
- Education: George Washington University
- Occupation: Real estate executive
- Known for: Turnbridge Equities (founder)
- Spouse: Claire Holt (m. 2018)
- Children: 3

Andrew Joblon (born 20 February 1983) is an American real estate executive and the founder and managing principal of Turnbridge Equities, a real estate investment and development firm. He is also known for his marriage to Australian actress Claire Holt.

== Early life and education ==
Joblon is from Dartmouth, Massachusetts. He attended Tabor Academy in Marion, Massachusetts, graduating in 2002. He attended the George Washington University School of Business, where he earned a degree in finance. During his time at the university, he developed an early interest in real estate.

== Career ==
He began his career as a financial analyst at CWCapital in 2006. Later that year, he joined Fisher Brothers, a New York real estate company where he eventually became senior vice president.

In 2014, Joblon founded Turnbridge Equities, a vertically integrated real estate investment firm.

== Personal life ==
Joblon dated actress Amanda Seyfried in 2011. In 2017, Joblon began dating actress Claire Holt. They became engaged in December 2017. The couple got married on August 18, 2018.

In March 2018, Holt revealed that she had suffered a miscarriage while expecting her first child with Joblon. They welcomed their first child, a son, in March 2019, followed by a daughter in September 2020. Their third child, a son, was born in November, 2023.

Joblon co-founded the Eric Trump Foundation with Eric Trump and Andrew Graves, and served on its board. He also served as an ambassador for the nonprofit organizations Habitat for Humanity, Many Hopes, and Harboring Hearts.

== See also ==
- Turnbridge Equities
