= Darren Barnet =

American actor (born 1991)

- Born: Darren Charles Barnet; April 27, 1991 (age 35); Los Angeles, California, U.S.
- Education: Berry College (B.A.)
- Occupation: Actor
- Years active: 2017–present
- Relatives: Charlie Barnet (grandfather)

Darren Charles Barnet (born April 27, 1991) is an American actor. He is known for playing Paxton Hall-Yoshida in the Netflix series Never Have I Ever and as Dr. John Frost starting in season 10 of Chicago Med.

== Early life and education ==
Darren Charles Barnet was born on April 27, 1991, in Los Angeles. His mother is Swedish of Japanese ancestry, while his father is American of German and Cherokee descent. Barnet's grandfather was swing musician Charlie Barnet. He has an older and a younger sister.

Barnet and his mother relocated to the suburbs of Orlando, Florida, when he was 12 years old. He graduated from Dr. Phillips High School in 2009, where he was the lacrosse team captain. He graduated from Berry College with a Bachelor of Arts in 2013, where he acted in plays and short films. Since the age of five, he wanted to be an actor but did not seriously pursue acting until college. In addition to English, he speaks Japanese and conversational Spanish, and has studied French.

== Career ==
After graduating in 2013, Barnet returned to Los Angeles to become an actor. He worked at SoulCycle on Sunset Boulevard as a bike attendant and front desk associate. He got his California real estate license in May 2015. He made his acting debut in 2017.

In 2017, Barnet had episodic roles in the television shows This Is Us, S.W.A.T., and Criminal Minds. In 2018, he starred as Hot Seth in the Brat-produced Facebook Watch limited streaming television series Turnt. That same year, he appeared in a supporting role in the Lifetime original television movie Instakiller, which marked his film debut.

In 2019, Barnet starred in an episodic role in the Netflix sitcom Family Reunion.

In April 2020, Barnet began starring in the Netflix teen comedy-drama streaming television series Never Have I Ever, as Paxton Hall-Yoshida, the crush of Devi Vishwakumar, the show's lead character, played by Maitreyi Ramakrishnan. Media noted the nearly 11-year age difference between Barnet and Ramakrishnan, with Barnet aged 29 at the beginning of the show. Co-creator Lang Fisher talked about Barnet and the audition process: "Darren was so good at the swoon-y stuff-being an aloof, cool guy-but he was actually very good at the comedy stuff in his audition, too." She continued, "You can't ask someone how old they are when they audition. You just have to assume that they're a reasonable age. I don't think we found out what his age was until we were deep in the season and then we were like, 'Oh, OK.' I assumed he was, like, 20. And the other thing I will say, when you see an actual 15-year-old boy, they're just not going to be a heartthrob. They look like a tiny baby." Both Never Have I Ever and Barnet's performance received positive reviews, with Netflix reporting that the series had been viewed by 40 million households globally since its release. The following month, he appeared in a brief role as character Wilfred "Freddy" Malick in the seventh season of ABC and Marvel's television series Agents of S.H.I.E.L.D. Later that year, Barnet starred in Universal Pictures' direct-to-video sex comedy film American Pie Presents: Girls' Rules.

In 2021, Barnet was part of an ensemble cast in the horror comedy film Untitled Horror Movie. The film was released on Prime Video, iTunes, and Vudu; and was positively received by critics and audiences, with praise for the cast's performances. In July 2021, he reprised his role as Paxton Hall-Yoshida in the second season of Netflix's Never Have I Ever. In November 2021, Barnet starred in the Netflix Christmas romantic comedy film Love Hard.

In April 2022, Barnet became the first male brand ambassador for Victoria's Secret PINK, and the brand's "Gender Free" collection. Later that month, he starred in the voice role of the protagonist Yuichi Usagi in Netflix's animated action-comedy series Samurai Rabbit: The Usagi Chronicles.

Barnet returned for the third and fourth seasons of Never Have I Ever.

Barnet starred and served as a producer on Michael Leo DeAngelo's psychological thriller drama film Apophenia.

Barnet voiced Taigen in Netflix's action-adventure anime series Blue Eye Samurai. He voiced the lead character Jak in Ascendant Studios' Immortals of Aveum video game, released in August 2023.

Barnet portrayed Matty Davis in the sports film Gran Turismo, based on the true story of Jann Mardenborough.

His most recent release was the 2023 romantic comedy film, Anyone But You starring Sydney Sweeney and Glen Powell. The movie received generally favorable reviews.

His next release was Road House, a Jake Gyllenhaal starring action film.

He starred in the Jurassic World Camp Cretaceous sequel series titled Jurassic World: Chaos Theory as Kenji Kon, replacing Ryan Potter from the previous series.

== Filmography ==
=== Film ===
Year	Title	Role	Notes	Ref.
2020	American Pie Presents: Girls' Rules	Grant		
2021	Untitled Horror Movie	Max	Also executive producer	
2021	Love Hard	Tag Abbott		
2023	Gran Turismo	Matty Davis		
2023	Anyone but You	Jonathan		
2023	Godzilla Minus One	Koichi Shikishima	2024 Netflix English dub	
2024	Road House	Sam		
TBA	Apophenia †	Peter	Post-production	

Key
†	Denotes films that have not yet been released

=== Television ===
Year	Title	Role	Notes	Ref.
2017	This Is Us	Young Jack	Episode: "The Right Thing to Do"	
2017	Criminal Minds	Zach Bower	Episode: "Unforgettable"	
2017	S.W.A.T.	Corby	Episode: "Imposters"	
2018	Turnt	Hot Seth	Recurring role; streaming television series	
2018	Instakiller	Joey	Television film	
2019	Family Reunion	Floyd	Episode: "Remember the First Day of School?"	
2020	Agents of S.H.I.E.L.D.	Wilfred "Freddy" Malick	2 episodes	
2020–2023	Never Have I Ever	Paxton Hall-Yoshida	Main role	
2022	Samurai Rabbit: The Usagi Chronicles	Yuichi Usagi (voice)	Main role	
2023	Skull Island	Mike (voice)	Main role	
2023–present	Blue Eye Samurai	Taigen (voice)	Series regular	
2024–2025	Jurassic World: Chaos Theory	Kenji Kon (voice)	Series regular	
2024–present	Chicago Med	Dr. John Frost	Series regular (season 10–present)	
2026-present	Avatar: Seven Havens	Daemin, Various voices		

=== Video games ===
Year	Title	Role	Ref.
2023	Immortals of Aveum	Jak	
