= List of Agents of S.H.I.E.L.D. characters =

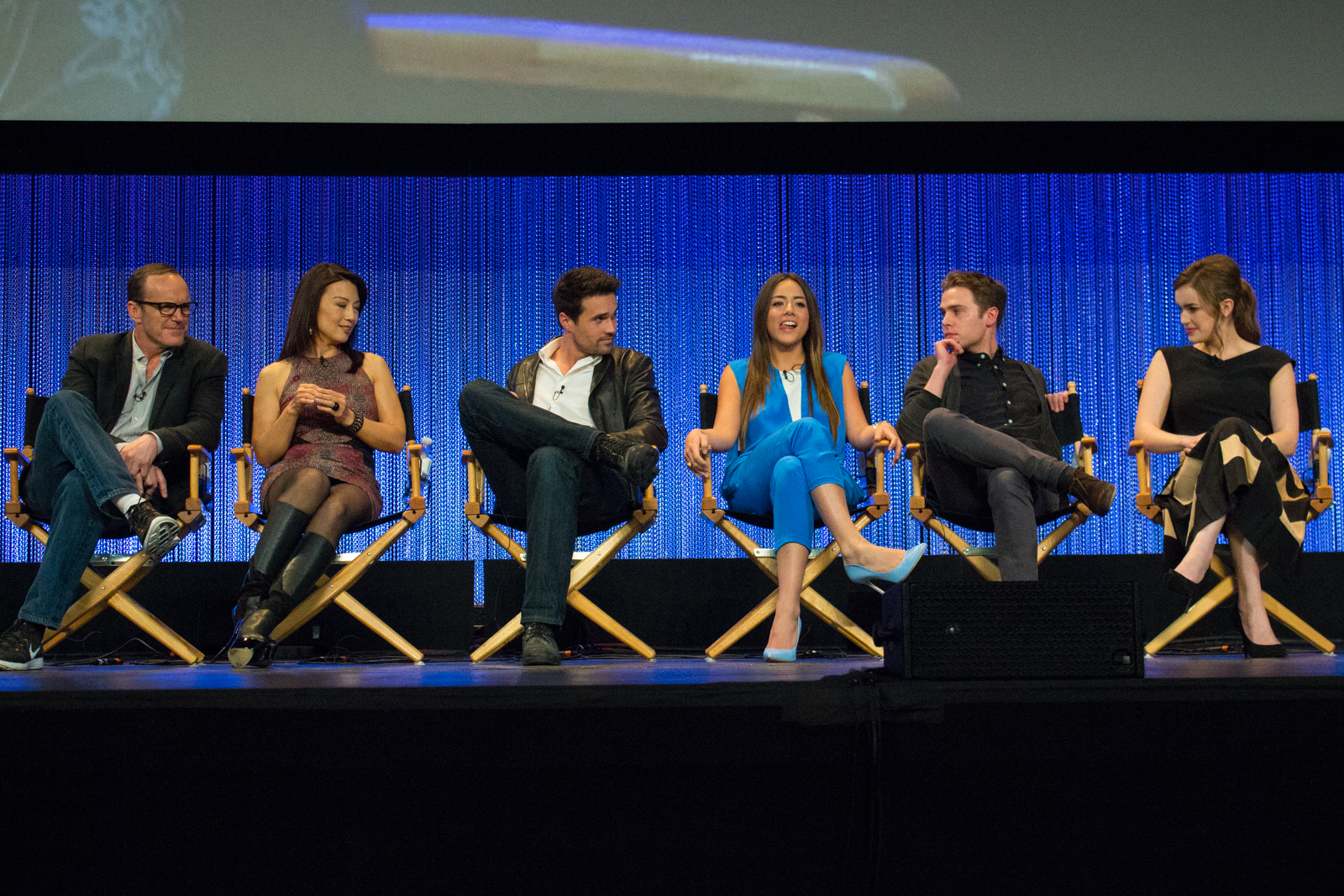
Main cast members (L–R) Gregg, Wen, Dalton, Bennet, De Caestecker, and Henstridge at PaleyFest 2014

Agents of S.H.I.E.L.D. is an American television series created for ABC by Joss Whedon, Jed Whedon, and Maurissa Tancharoen, based on the Marvel Comics organization S.H.I.E.L.D. (Strategic Homeland Intervention, Enforcement and Logistics Division), a fictional peacekeeping and spy agency in a world of superheroes. It is set in the Marvel Cinematic Universe (MCU), and it acknowledges the continuity of the franchise's films and other television series.

The series stars Clark Gregg, reprising his role of Phil Coulson from the films, as well as Ming-Na Wen, Brett Dalton, Chloe Bennet, Iain De Caestecker, and Elizabeth Henstridge. Nick Blood and Adrianne Palicki joined the cast for the second and third seasons, while Henry Simmons and Luke Mitchell had recurring roles in the second season before being promoted to the main cast for the third. John Hannah, who recurred in the third season, joined the main cast in the fourth, while Natalia Cordova-Buckley, who recurred in both the third and fourth seasons, was promoted to the main cast for the series' fifth season. Jeff Ward was promoted to the main cast for the sixth season after recurring in the fifth. Additionally, some characters from Marvel Cinematic Universe films and Marvel One-Shots also appear throughout the series, along with other characters based on various Marvel Comics properties. Several characters from the series also appear in the supplemental digital series Agents of S.H.I.E.L.D.: Slingshot.

This list includes the series' main cast, all guest stars deemed to have had recurring roles throughout the series, and any other guest who is otherwise notable.

== Overview ==
Character	Portrayed by	Appearances							
Character	Portrayed by	First	Season 1	Season 2	Season 3	Season 4	Season 5	Season 6	Season 7
Main characters
Phil Coulson (Note: These characters and actors appear in Agents of S.H.I.E.L.D.: Slingshot.)	Clark Gregg	"Pilot"	Main	Main	Main	Main	Main	Recurring	
Sarge / Pachakutiq	Clark Gregg	"Missing Pieces"						Main	
Phil Coulson (Chronicom L.M.D.)	Clark Gregg	"New Life"						Guest	Main
Melinda May	Ming-Na Wen	"Pilot"	Main	Main	Main	Main	Main	Main	Main
Grant Ward	Brett Dalton	"Pilot"	Main	Main	Main	Recurring			
Hive	Brett Dalton	"4,722 Hours"			Main		Guest (Note: In season five, Dalton appears as an uncredited guest star in the episode "The Real Deal", using archival footage.)		
Skye / Daisy Johnson Quake	Chloe Bennet	"Pilot"	Main	Main	Main	Main	Main	Main	Main
Leo Fitz	Iain De Caestecker	"Pilot"	Main	Main	Main	Main	Main	Main	Guest
Jemma Simmons	Elizabeth Henstridge	"Pilot"	Main	Main	Main	Main	Main	Main	Main
Lance Hunter	Nick Blood	"Shadows"		Main	Main		Guest		
Bobbi Morse	Adrianne Palicki	"A Hen in the Wolf House"		Main (Note: In season two, Palicki began the season as a recurring guest star. She was promoted to series regular with the episode "Aftershocks".)	Main				
Alphonso "Mack" Mackenzie	Henry Simmons	"Shadows"		Recurring	Main	Main	Main	Main	Main
Lincoln Campbell	Luke Mitchell	"Afterlife"		Recurring	Main				
Holden Radcliffe	John Hannah	"The Singularity"			Recurring	Main			
Elena "Yo-Yo" Rodriguez	Natalia Cordova-Buckley	"Bouncing Back"			Recurring	Recurring	Main	Main	Main
Deke Shaw	Jeff Ward	"Orientation"					Recurring	Main	Main
Recurring characters
Mike Peterson Deathlok	J. August Richards	"Pilot"	Recurring	Guest			Guest		
Ian Quinn	David Conrad	"The Asset"	Recurring				Guest		
Raina	Ruth Negga	"Girl in the Flower Dress"	Recurring	Recurring			Guest		
Victoria Hand	Saffron Burrows	"The Hub"	Recurring						
Victoria Hand	Rachele Schank	"The End Is at Hand"							Guest
Davis	Maximilian Osinski	"Repairs"	Guest			Guest	Recurring	Recurring	Guest
Anne Weaver	Christine Adams	"Seeds"	Guest	Recurring					
John Garrett The Clairvoyant	Bill Paxton	"T.A.H.I.T.I."	Recurring						
John Garrett The Clairvoyant	James Paxton	"Stolen"							Guest
Antoine Triplett	B. J. Britt	"T.A.H.I.T.I."	Recurring	Recurring		Guest			
Glenn Talbot Graviton	Adrian Pasdar	"Providence"	Guest	Recurring	Recurring	Recurring	Recurring		
The Koenigs	Patton Oswalt	"Providence"	Guest	Recurring		Guest			Guest
Calvin Johnson	Kyle MacLachlan	"Beginning of the End"	Guest	Recurring					
Werner Reinhardt / Daniel Whitehall	Reed Diamond	"Shadows"		Recurring	Guest		Guest		
Sunil Bakshi	Simon Kassianides	"Shadows"		Recurring		Guest			
Carl Creel	Brian Patrick Wade	"Shadows"		Guest	Guest		Recurring		
Kara Palamas Agent 33	Maya Stojan	"Making Friends and Influencing People"		Recurring					
Jiaying	Dichen Lachman	"The Things We Bury"		Recurring					Guest
Gordon	Jamie Harris	"What They Become"		Recurring					
Gordon	Fin Argus	"After, Before"							Guest
Andrew Garner Lash	Blair Underwood	"One of Us"		Guest	Recurring				
Andrew Garner Lash	Matthew Willig	"Laws of Nature"			Recurring		Guest		
Robert Gonzales	Edward James Olmos	"Love in the Time of Hydra"		Recurring					
Alisha Whitley	Alicia Vela-Bailey	"Scars"		Guest	Recurring				
Kebo	Daz Crawford	"S.O.S."		Guest	Recurring				
Rosalind Price	Constance Zimmer	"Laws of Nature"			Recurring				
Luther Banks	Andrew Howard	"Laws of Nature"			Recurring				
Joey Gutierrez	Juan Pablo Raba	"Laws of Nature"			Recurring				
Werner von Strucker	Spencer Treat Clark	"Purpose in the Machine"			Recurring		Recurring		
Gideon Malick	Powers Boothe	"Among Us Hide..."			Recurring				
Gideon Malick	Cameron Palatas	"Paradise Lost"			Guest				Guest
Giyera	Mark Dacascos	"Many Heads, One Tale"			Recurring				
Polly Hinton	Lola Glaudini	"Spacetime"			Guest		Recurring		
J. T. James Hellfire	Axle Whitehead	"Paradise Lost"			Recurring	Guest			
Anderson	Alexander Wraith	"Paradise Lost"			Guest	Guest			
Nathaniel Malick	Joel Dabney Courtney	"Paradise Lost"			Guest				
Nathaniel Malick	Thomas E. Sullivan	"A Trout in the Milk"							Recurring
Piper	Briana Venskus	"Failed Experiments"			Guest	Guest	Recurring	Recurring	Guest
Aida "Ophelia" Madame Hydra	Mallory Jansen	"Ascension"			Guest	Recurring			
Robbie Reyes Ghost Rider	Gabriel Luna	"The Ghost"				Recurring			
Gabe Reyes	Lorenzo James Henrie	"The Ghost"				Recurring			
Lucy Bauer	Lilli Birdsell	"The Ghost"				Recurring			
Jeffrey Mace Patriot	Jason O'Mara	"Meet the New Boss"				Recurring			
Ellen Nadeer	Parminder Nagra	"Uprising"				Recurring			
Burrows	Patrick Cavanaugh	"Uprising"				Recurring			
Eli Morrow	José Zúñiga	"Let Me Stand Next to Your Fire"				Recurring			
Anton Ivanov The Superior	Zach McGowan	"Hot Potato Soup"				Recurring	Guest		
Hope Mackenzie	Jordan Rivera	"Identity and Change"				Recurring			
Enoch	Joel Stoffer	"World's End"				Guest	Recurring	Recurring	Recurring
Tess	Eve Harlow	"Orientation"					Recurring		
Kasius	Dominic Rains	"Orientation"					Recurring		
Sinara	Florence Faivre	"Orientation"					Recurring		
Grill	Pruitt Taylor Vince	"Orientation"					Recurring		
Flint	Coy Stewart	"A Life Spent"					Recurring	Guest	Guest
Hale	Catherine Dent	"Rewind"					Recurring		
Ruby	Dove Cameron	"All the Comforts of Home"					Recurring		
Qovas	Peter Mensah	"The Devil Complex"					Recurring		
Marcus Benson	Barry Shabaka Henley	"Missing Pieces"						Recurring	
Jaco	Winston James Francis	"Missing Pieces"						Recurring	
Snowflake	Brooke Williams	"Missing Pieces"						Recurring	
Pax	Matt O'Leary	"Missing Pieces"						Recurring	
Malachi	Christopher James Baker	"Fear and Loathing on the Planet of Kitson"						Recurring	
Izel	Karolina Wydra	"Toldja"						Recurring	
Wilfred "Freddy" Malick	Darren Barnet Neal Bledsoe	"The New Deal"							Recurring
Luke	Tobias Jelinek	"The New Deal"							Recurring
Daniel Sousa	Enver Gjokaj	"Alien Commies from the Future!"							Recurring
Sibyl	Tamara Taylor	"Alien Commies from the Future!"							Recurring
Kora	Dianne Doan	"After, Before"							Recurring

== Main characters ==
=== Phil Coulson ===
Phillip "Phil" Coulson (portrayed by Clark Gregg) was the S.H.I.E.L.D. agent in charge of Project T.A.H.I.T.I., meant to bring a potential dead Avenger back to life using a drug derived from an ancient alien corpse. Following his death in The Avengers, Fury resurrected Coulson using T.A.H.I.T.I. Coulson puts together a team of agents, and they travel the world dealing with strange new cases. During this time, Hydra is revealed to have infiltrated S.H.I.E.L.D. Fury makes Coulson the new Director of S.H.I.E.L.D., and tasks him with rebuilding the agency "the right way". It is later discovered that Phil Coulson is dying due to the side effect of having Ghost Rider in him during the final battle with Aida. Following the final battle with the gravitonium-enhanced Glenn Talbot, Coulson retires to live out his last days on Tahiti with May.

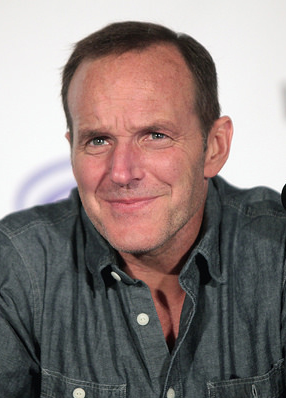
Clark Gregg

Phil Coulson was created for Iron Man; he was the first S.H.I.E.L.D. agent introduced in the MCU, and was portrayed by Gregg, who went on to play the character in several other MCU films and Marvel One-Shots. At the 2012 New York Comic Con, Gregg was announced to be starring as Coulson in Agents of S.H.I.E.L.D., despite the character dying in The Avengers." In April 2013, Gregg said that he had found creator Joss Whedon's explanation for Coulson's resurrection "fascinating" and "true to the world of the comics and mythology in general".

==== Sarge / Pachakutiq ====
Sarge (portrayed by Clark Gregg) is a man who looks like Phil Coulson; even having the same DNA. He leads a group of mercenaries to Earth on a mission involving targeting people possessed by Shrikes (alien parasites). While he and his group are in S.H.I.E.L.D. custody, Sarge reveals that the Shrikes' creator, Izel, has destroyed his planet and his family; leading him onto his path of revenge. Sarge later remembers that his real name is Pachakutiq and that he is merely possessing a clone body of Coulson which was created by the Di'Allas and sent a hundred years into the past on his and Izel's home planet. After being confronted by Daisy and fully realizing his powers, it's revealed that traces of Coulson lie inside Sarge and he wants to die before he hurts anyone else.

==== Phil Coulson (Chronicom L.M.D.) ====
Following the deaths of Izel and Sarge, Enoch and Simmons create a Life Model Decoy of Phil Coulson enhanced with Chronicom technology using the remnants of the previous L.M.D.s and the memories of Coulson saved to the Framework. Upon being briefed of what has occurred since then, he joins the team in stopping the Chronicoms from changing history. After defeating the Chronicoms, the Coulson L.M.D. receives his counterpart's car, Lola, and travels the world.

=== Melinda May ===
Melinda Qiaolian May (portrayed by Ming-Na Wen) is a S.H.I.E.L.D. pilot and weapons expert nicknamed "the Cavalry", against her wishes, after a mission to Bahrain where she saved an entire S.H.I.E.L.D. team from a rogue Inhuman. Unbeknownst to S.H.I.E.L.D., she did this by killing a young girl named Katya Belyakov. Still struggling to move past this event years later, May agrees to watch her old friend and partner Coulson for Nick Fury, reporting to the latter and looking for potential side-effects of Project T.A.H.I.T.I. in the former. When Coulson becomes the new Director of S.H.I.E.L.D., May acts as his second-in-command, and over time begins to move past the events of Bahrain and even develop familial relationships with characters such as Skye. By mid-season five, she begins a relationship with Phil Coulson. Following the fight against the gravitonium-enhanced Glenn Talbot, May joins Coulson in his final days on Tahiti. In season six, she assists in dealing with threats involving Sarge's group and Izel, though she is grievously wounded in the process. After Simmons revives her in season seven, May gains empathetic powers, which she uses during the final battle against the Chronicoms to download empathy into the Chronicom Hunters. One year later, May becomes a teacher at S.H.I.E.L.D.'s Coulson Academy, with Flint as one of her students.

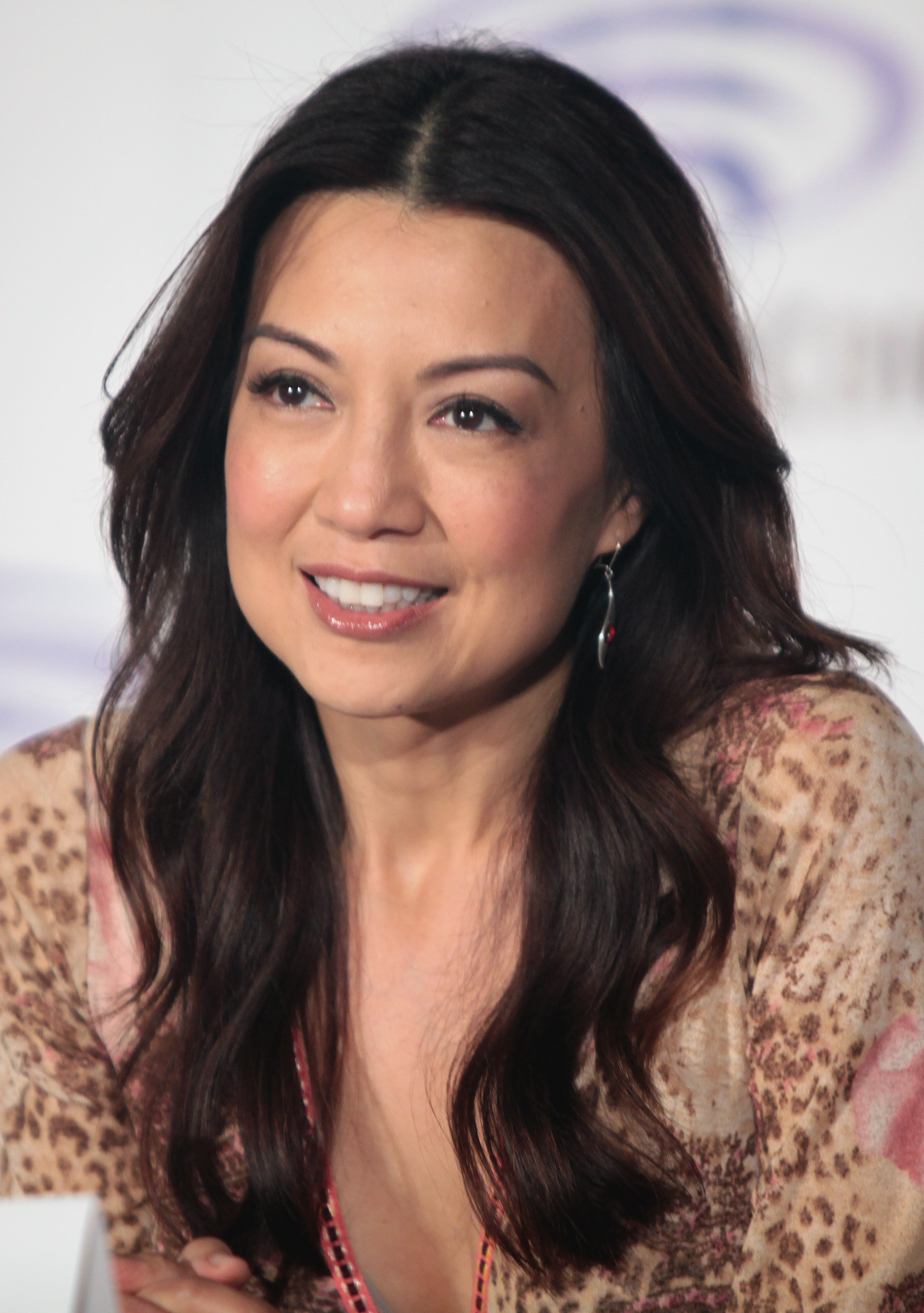
Ming-Na Wen

Wen had been on the "forefront" of the producers' wishlist to appear in the series, and after a general meeting, they pursued her for the part; Wen was cast as May in October 2012. Whedon had the character, who was originally listed with the name Agent Althea Rice on casting sheets, "rolling around in his head" for a long time. In preparation for the role, Wen was "given a couple of background stories" about May, but found it challenging to play a character who is respected by those around her when the audience doesn't know why, stating "It's a challenge in different ways....I use some of my own personal experience where we've been scarred or we've been greatly disappointed".

Wen received nominations for 'Favorite Actress in a New TV Series' at the 40th People's Choice Awards and 'Favorite Female TV Star – Family Show' at the 29th Kids' Choice Awards. Wen was also named TVLine's "Performer of the Week" for the week of April 12, 2015, for her performance in "Melinda", specifically her portrayal of May in the flashback sequences.

=== Grant Ward ===
Grant Douglas Ward (portrayed by Brett Dalton), the son of politicians, was abused as a child by his parents and older brother Christian. After attempting to kill Christian by burning their house down, Grant meets John Garrett, a Hydra double agent within S.H.I.E.L.D., who trains Grant to be a skilled agent. He is assigned to Coulson's team as the group's muscle and wetwork specialist, but is outed as Hydra when that organization is revealed to the world. After the death of Garrett, he becomes a prisoner of S.H.I.E.L.D. He falls in love with his former teammate Skye. Grant escapes custody, apparently kills Christian and their parents, and infiltrates Hydra so Skye can meet her father. Despite this, Skye turns on Ward and shoots him, and he escapes only with the help of former S.H.I.E.L.D. agent Kara Palamas, with whom he develops a romantic relationship. He accidentally kills Palamas while she is in disguise as May, and blaming S.H.I.E.L.D., decides to take over the now leader-less Hydra. Joining forces with one of Hydra's previous leaders, Gideon Malick, Ward travels through a portal to an alien planet in search of the ancient Inhuman Hive, but is killed there by Coulson.

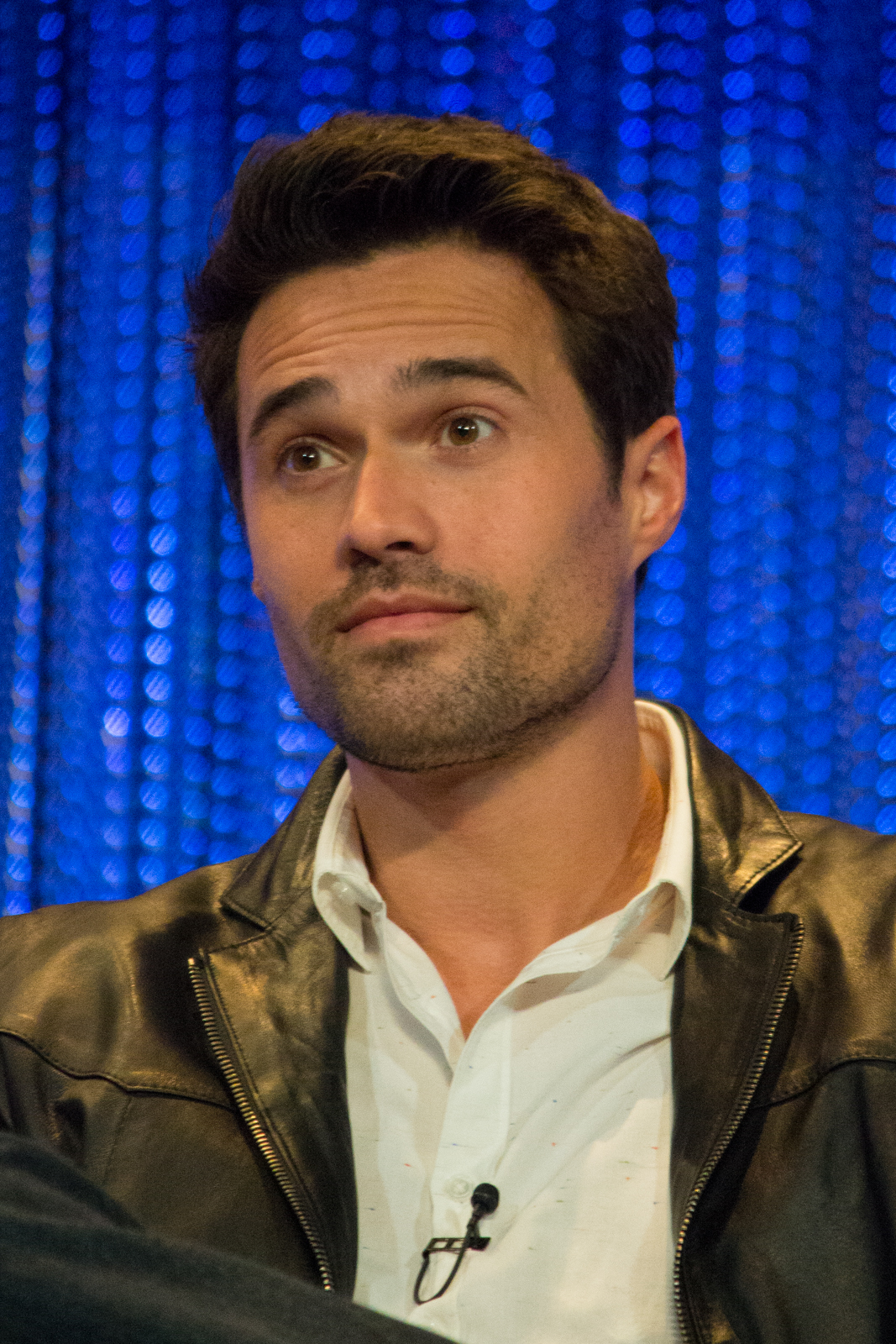
Brett Dalton

Dalton was cast in November 2012. From the conception of the series it was decided that Grant Ward would be a traitor, with executive producer Jed Whedon saying "since [the events of Captain America: The Winter Soldier are] an infiltration based on betrayal on a massive scale, we wanted to have it on the small scale, and have it be a really personal dagger to the heart."

Dalton won for 'Male Breakout Star' at the 2014 Teen Choice Awards. The character of Grant Ward garnered a fan following, with a group known as the "Ward Warriors" often using the hashtag "StandWithWard" on social media. Dalton was surprised that people "seem to be standing with Ward no matter what he does....there are people out there who just seem to be following this character wherever he goes. I think that's brilliant....There isn't any character like him on the show, and I would say even within the Marvel canon." As a "shoutout" to these fans, Palamas says, "I will always stand with Ward" in the second-season finale, which Dalton called "a testament to the fans, this incredibly loyal fanbase that has now influenced the script of our show."

=== Hive ===
Hive is a parasite who can connect with and control the minds of other Inhumans and feed off of or possess humans. Among the first of his kind, he was originally called "Alveus". Created by the Kree from a Mayan hunter (portrayed by Jason Glover) to lead their Inhuman army against mankind, Hive incited a rebellion, uniting humans and Inhumans to drive the Kree from Earth. Soon, a faction of Hive's followers who feared his power banished him through a portal to the planet Maveth, where he destroyed a civilization over centuries. He eventually only survived on human sacrifices sent through the portal by followers, and their descendants, still loyal to him: Hydra. Hive escapes through the portal in modern times by possessing the body of Grant Ward. He retains the memories of all the bodies he has inhabited, including now Hydra leader Gideon Malick's brother Nathaniel, and punishes Gideon for causing Nathaniel's sacrifice by murdering his daughter Stephanie, before taking control of Johnson, with whom Ward was in love, and using her to kill Gideon. Hive then takes steps to recreate the original Kree experiment that made him, planning to use a warhead to spread a pathogen around the world and transform all humans into Primitive Inhumans. He is destroyed when S.H.I.E.L.D. traps him in a quinjet with the warhead and detonates it in space.

What's so great about [Ward] is, he started off as one of the good guys, as one of the original team. Here we are, coming full circle, with him being on the completely opposite side of that. He's not just one of the bad guys—he's the bad guy!...I feel like I've gotten to do three characters.

— Dalton on shifting to the role of Hive for the third season.

Based on the Hive, "a genetic experiment created by Hydra" in the Secret Warriors comic, Hive possesses the corpses of first Will Daniels and then Grant Ward in the show, with Dillon Casey and Brett Dalton portraying the reanimated bodies, respectively. Jason Glover briefly appears as Hive's original human form, while Dalton portrays Hive's true, CGI-created Inhuman form through motion capture. On having Hive possess Ward's body, Whedon explained that Ward has "been the baddie for a while and I thought it was a nice way to escalate this character....there's still memories in there. So there's still an aspect of the man we came to love to hate in there, but we wanted to give it some extra juice and we wanted to give Brett one more challenge where he has to change his character."

Hive's true form, as portrayed by Dalton through motion capture

Dalton aimed to emulate Meryl Streep's character in The Devil Wears Prada, who never spoke above "a conversational level...She didn't pound on her chest and make sure everybody knew that she's powerful, she just was." Dalton also changed his voice to represent the memories of Will Daniels and Nathaniel Malick "just a little bit. I tried to change my voice in there, I tried to change even my level of expression in there because I was supposed to be channeling somebody else entirely coming through." Dalton called the coat that Hive wears later in the third season "iconic and timeless", noting that "fashion wasn't on the forefront of [Ward's] mind", while Hive is more theatrical, "colorful without having to do much."

Hive's ultimate goal is "connection", with Dalton saying, "all these Inhumans have a purpose. Hive finds his purpose has to do with somehow connecting all of the Inhumans. What we see is Hive's attempt to fulfill what he thinks is his destiny...this desperate need to connect. Gregg called Hive "the perfect villain for this show because he carries with him the memories, desire, hatreds and agendas of Will and of Grant Ward. At the same time, he's got a much deeper, bigger agenda that's thousands of years old, and gave birth to Hydra." Dalton described him as a "survivor" who "does not think small. This person has been around for way too long to think in anything other than global terms." He saw this as a fundamental difference between the character and Ward, who "just becomes single minded and is hellbent on one thing at a time....Hive is the opposite. He sees every move on the chess board. That's what we're seeing in terms of Hive's thinking. It is about a new world order of sorts." On how much influence the memories of those whose bodies Hive inhabits have on the character, Dalton said, "It's the motivations...you're seeing a flash of it. It's almost like seeing your kid. There are flashes of you in there...but then again, it's not me."

Dalton realized that Hive would not be on the show for long when he took the part, with "the big, big bad" less likely to last as long as an "anti-hero" like Ward. On Hive's final scene in the third-season finale, Dalton noted that there would have been no point in the character doing anything other than reflect: "It's like looking into a fire. Somehow the truth comes out. You're looking at the Earth, man. It's so far away. And you'll get a perspective on things. For Hive, he was trying to change that entire thing and everyone who was on there....I think there's a great deal of remorse [that he was not] able to achieve that connection and do all the things that [he] wanted to do. But there was also an acceptance."

=== Skye / Daisy Johnson / Quake ===
Daisy Johnson (portrayed by Chloe Bennet) was born in China to Calvin Johnson and his Inhuman wife Jiaying, but was soon taken by S.H.I.E.L.D. agents and raised as an orphan by nuns. Taking the name "Skye", she became a skilled hacktivist, opposing organizations like S.H.I.E.L.D. This led to her involvement with Coulson, who decided to recruit her and have Ward, and then May, train her to be a formidable field agent. After reuniting with her father, Skye chooses to drive him away, knowing him to be a monster and murderer, though his wishes for her to fulfill her destiny—by unlocking her Inhuman abilities—are granted when she unintentionally comes into contact with the Terrigen Mists, which give her earthquake-generating abilities. Skye soon meets Jiaying, who helps Skye control her abilities. Skye's loyalties are tested when Jiaying attempts to start a war with S.H.I.E.L.D., and she ultimately sides with S.H.I.E.L.D. Now using her birth name, Johnson forms a S.H.I.E.L.D. team of Inhumans named the Secret Warriors. After briefly being connected to Hive, and watching Lincoln Campbell, with whom she developed a romantic relationship, sacrifice himself for her, Johnson leaves S.H.I.E.L.D. and becomes known as the powered vigilante "Quake" to the public. She later returns to S.H.I.E.L.D. following the fight with Eli Morrow in season four. While traveling through time to stop the Chronicoms from changing history in season seven, she enters a relationship with Agent Daniel Sousa and discovers she had a half-sister, Kora, who died in the original timeline. After helping an alternative timeline version of Kora join the team, Daisy continues to work with her and Sousa one year after defeating the Chronicoms.

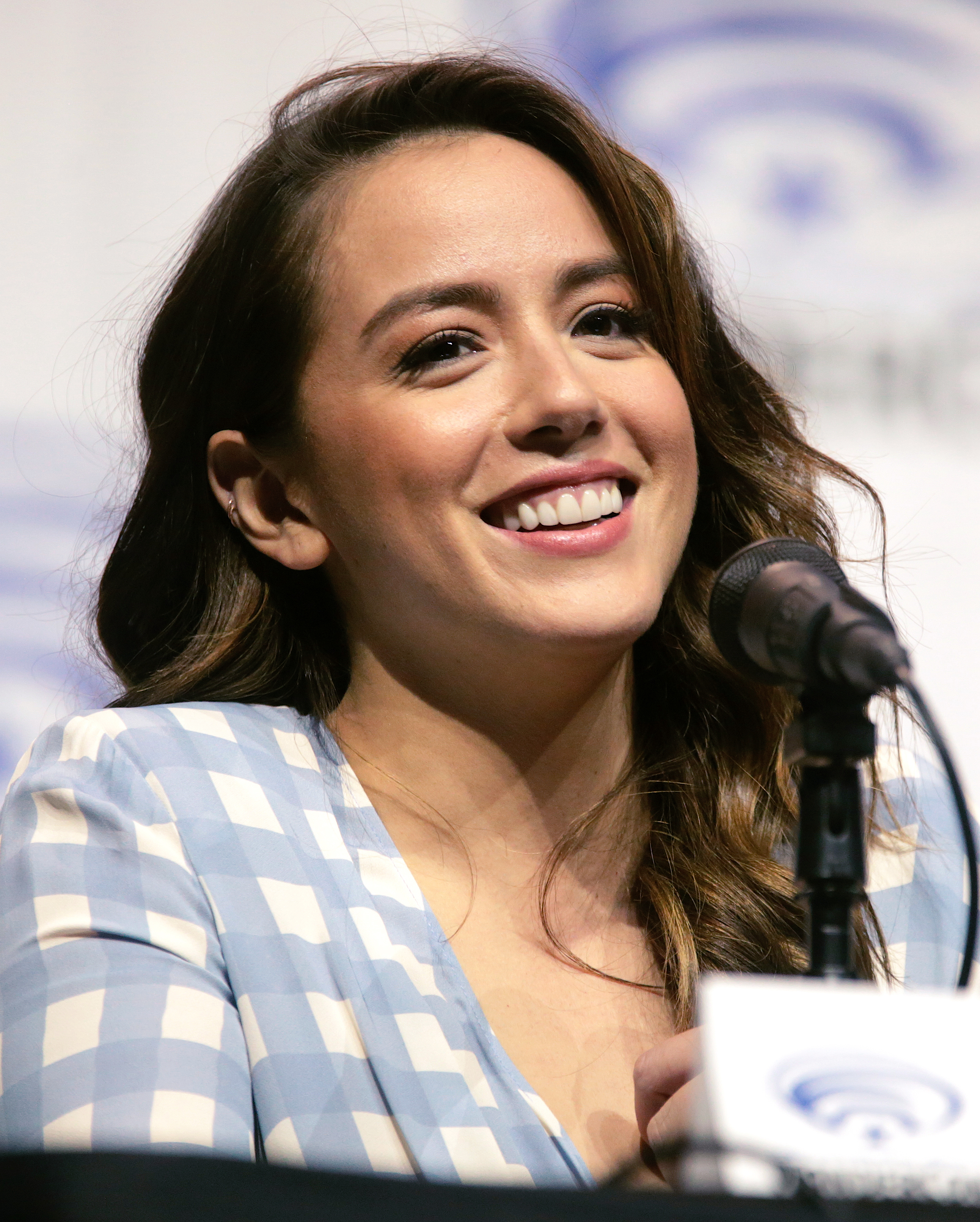
Chloe Bennet

Daisy Johnson was created by Brian Michael Bendis and Gabriele Dell'Otto for Secret War #2. When the character of Skye was introduced to the series, it was always intended that she would be the MCU version of Johnson, as executive producer Maurissa Tancharoen explained, "there are always the series of clearances, but we always knew we wanted to evolve Skye into something else. Daisy Johnson was the main character that we wanted to go for. We got confirmation on that very early on, so we've been on that track ever since." Bennet was cast as Skye in December 2012, out of more than 400 actresses who auditioned for the role. Tancharoen stated, "With Skye, we were going for the hot girl that every guy wants to hang out with and every girl sort of wants to be". Bennet described herself as "technologically inept", striving to learn the terms necessary to portray Skye, as she is proficient with technology. Bennet also began taking boxing lessons to prepare for the part. Unlike the comic version, Skye is an Inhuman; Jed Whedon explained that "We've created a different origin for her...we merged those two ideas together also because there are such rabid fans out there that if we stick to original story points from the comics, they will smell story points from miles away. Those two factors led us to coming up with a different notion of how she got her powers." During a single-shot fight sequence in "The Dirty Half Dozen", Bennet broke her arm and finished the second season without wearing a cast.

Bennet received nominations for 'Favorite TV Actress' and 'Favorite Female TV Star – Family Show' at the 28th and 29th Kids' Choice Awards, respectively.

=== Leo Fitz ===
Leopold "Leo" James Fitz (portrayed by Iain De Caestecker) is brought on to Coulson's team as an engineering and weapons technology specialist, and provides tech support for the team throughout the first season. He has a close bond with Agent Simmons, the two having graduated from the S.H.I.E.L.D. academy together. At the end of the first season, he confesses his feelings to Simmons before nearly dying in an attempt to save her. Left with severe brain damage, Fitz struggles with technology and speech, but over time becomes a full member of the team again. When his consciousness is submerged in the Framework, Fitz becomes "The Doctor", Hydra's remorseless second-in-command, and has a relationship with Madame Hydra. The experience changes him; retaining his memories of this other life and leaving him haunted by his past actions. After Enoch sends his team to the future via a Monolith, he helps Fitz get there in a cyro-stasis pod before helping them return to the present, after which Fitz and Simmons get married. During the final battle against a gravitonium-enhanced Glenn Talbot, Fitz is fatally injured. As Daisy and Simmons lead the search for the cryogenically frozen Fitz in space, Enoch releases him prematurely when they come under attack. They eventually reunite with Simmons, but the Chronicoms capture them and force them to figure out time travel. However, Enoch rescues them and helps them build a time machine so they can save their friends and stop the Chronicoms from changing history. One year later, Fitz and Simmons retire from S.H.I.E.L.D. so they can raise their daughter, Alya.

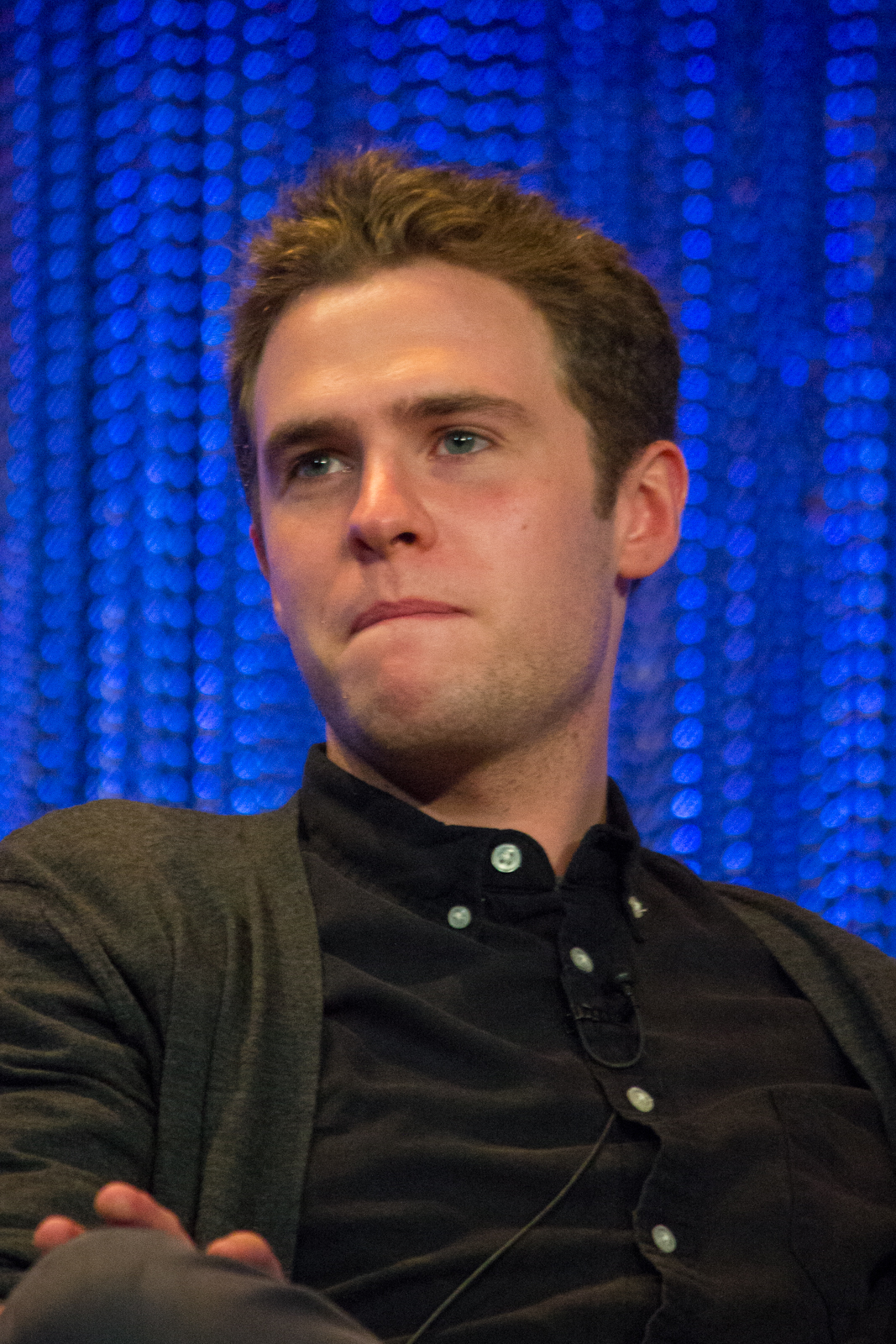
Iain De Caestecker

De Caestecker was cast as Fitz in November 2012. The producers had been aware of De Caestecker from his work on the BBC Three series The Fades. Originally, Fitz was envisioned to have a more cocky personality, and morphed into the "insecure genius" once De Caestecker was cast.

De Caestecker, in describing the character, said that "Fitz has got this funny kind of temper. He's quite passionate about what he does. So those moments where—I don't think he's someone that really responds very quickly to emotion; he doesn't really understand emotions as much". Fitz has a lot of interaction with Simmons in the series, with De Caestecker explaining "My character, he's Engineering, so he's on the computer and tech side of everything. He's consumed within that world, and he works very closely with Simmons, who's Biochem. They've got this kind of weird chemistry together, and they just kind of fit each other in a very weird way."

Despite being announced as a main cast member for the seventh season, De Caestecker does not appear in the first ten episodes, as he was committed to another project when the season started filming. He first appears in flashback sequences in "Brand New Day", receiving special guest star credit for his appearance.

De Caestecker was named TVLine's "Performer of the Week" for the week of September 27, 2015, for his performance in "Laws of Nature", particularly the episode's final scene.

==== The Doctor ====
In the fourth season, Fitz's consciousness is submerged in the Framework virtual reality. He becomes "The Doctor", also known as Leopold, Hydra's remorseless second-in-command, and has a relationship with Aida, who now goes by Ophelia / Madame Hydra. After taking the position of Head of Hydra following Aida's incapacitation, he creates for Aida a machine to become a real person. He is forced out of the Framework by S.H.I.E.L.D., after which point Fitz is traumatized from his behavior there as The Doctor.

Due to multiple stressful factors across separate timelines in the fifth and sixth seasons, Fitz experiences a psychic split that enables his "Doctor" personality from the Framework to temporarily resurface. In the first timeline Fitz, on their orders, proceeds to dissect Daisy Johnson, while in the second timeline, The Doctor falls in love with the id of Jemma Simmons.

=== Jemma Simmons ===
Jemma Anne Simmons (portrayed by Elizabeth Henstridge) is brought on to Coulson's team as a life sciences (both human and alien) specialist, and has a close bond with Agent Fitz, the two having graduated from the S.H.I.E.L.D. academy together. She grows to mistrust all things alien and superhuman, but shows her loyalty to Coulson despite this when they are faced with the rival S.H.I.E.L.D. faction. Following the fight against the Inhumans, Simmons is absorbed by the Kree monolith, a portal to the alien planet Maveth. There, she falls in love with Will Daniels, who sacrifices himself so she can return to Earth. Simmons eventually moves on from Daniels and begins a relationship with Fitz and eventually marries him. After Fitz is killed, Simmons joins the mission to find the preserved body that Enoch had. They temporarily reunite until the Chronicoms kidnap them to force them to figure out time travel so they can save their home planet. However, Enoch rescues them and helps them save their friends and builds a time machine to help them stop the Chronicoms from changing history. Following the mission's success, Fitz and Simmons retire from S.H.I.E.L.D. to raise their daughter, Alya.

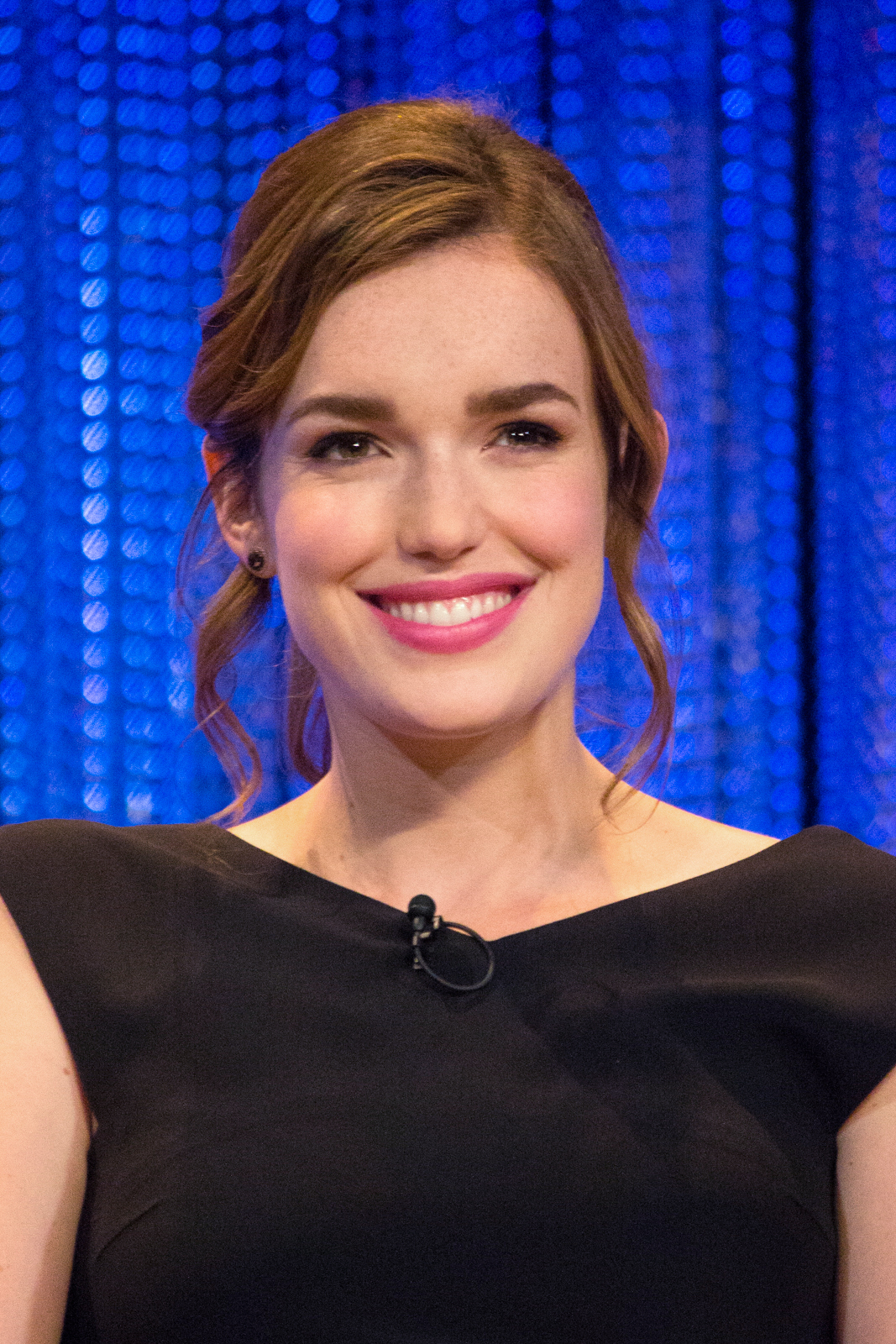
Elizabeth Henstridge

Henstridge was also cast in November 2012. The character was originally envisioned as the "nagging worrywart" on the team, but changed when Henstridge brought an enthusiasm to the role the producers were looking for. She described her character as "a biochem expert. She's young and hungry and she's a great woman to play because she's intelligent and focused and curious and she doesn't apologize for it. She's got a wonderful relationship with Fitz. They kind of bounce off each other."

Henstridge was named TVLine's "Performer of the Week" for the week of October 25, 2015, for her performance in "4,722 Hours", particularly for carrying the episode herself.

=== Lance Hunter ===
Lance Hunter (portrayed by Nick Blood), an SAS lieutenant turned mercenary, joins post-Hydra S.H.I.E.L.D. at the request of Coulson following a recommendation from his ex-wife Bobbi Morse. Despite a tumultuous relationship with Morse, Hunter becomes a full-time S.H.I.E.L.D. agent, and risks his life to save her when she is kidnapped. Following an incident in Russia involving the near-assassination of Prime Minister Olshenko, Hunter and Morse decide to disavow themselves from S.H.I.E.L.D. to protect Coulson and the team. Hunter continues doing mercenary work, with Fitz eventually reaching out for Hunter to free him from General Hale's base while posing as a lawyer. Hunter helps Fitz rescue Coulson and the team when they are transported to 2091 where their trail led them to Enoch.

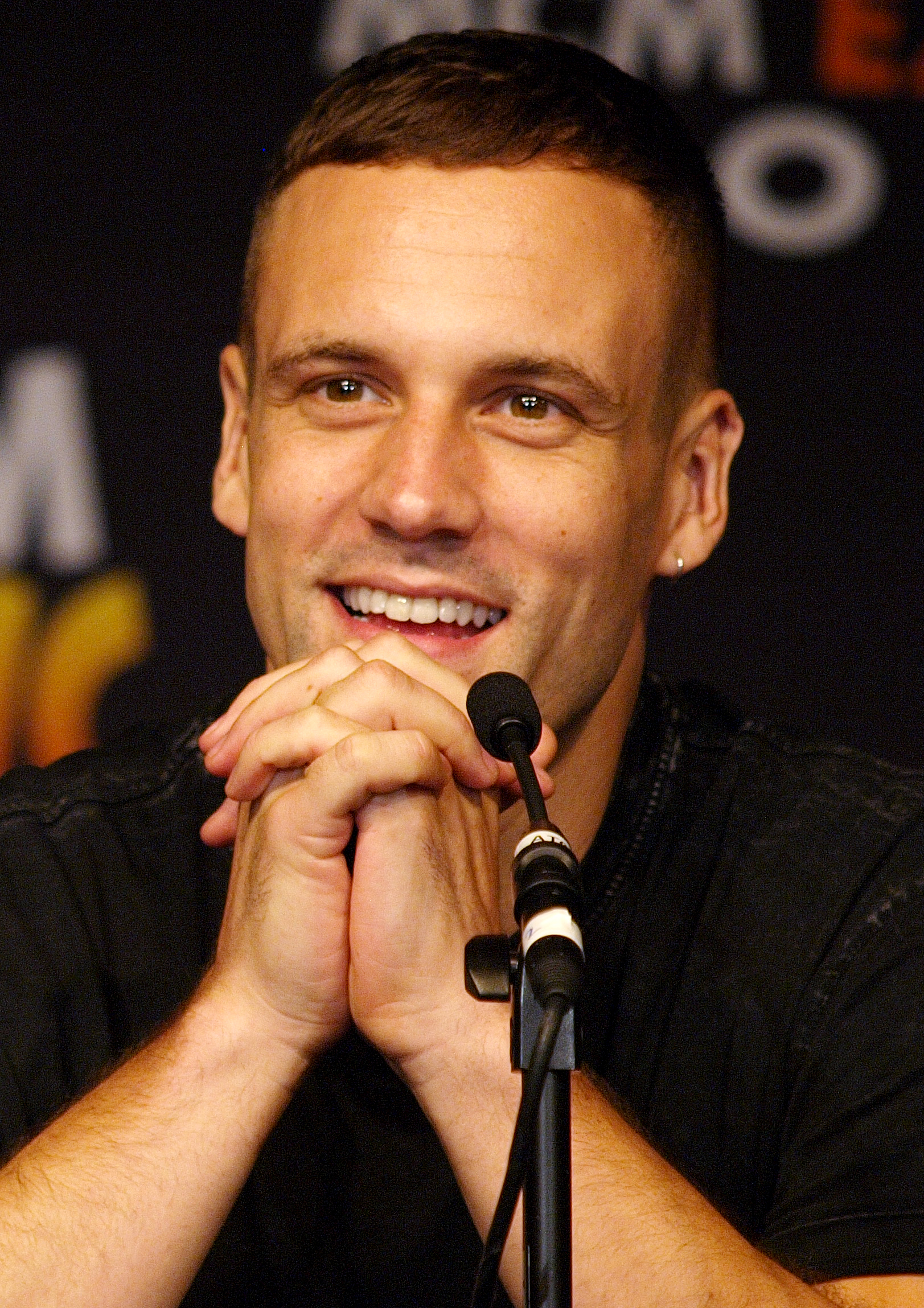
Nick Blood

Lance Hunter, created by Gary Friedrich as the British version of Nick Fury for Captain Britain Weekly, was confirmed in September 2014 to be a member of the principal cast for the second season. Blood was announced as cast at the 2014 San Diego Comic-Con, where the character was described as not a S.H.I.E.L.D. agent, but a mercenary. On his character joining the cast, Blood explained that "each different character, the original characters, has a different kind of response to [Hunter]. Generally I think they're slightly wary, a little bit suspicious, [but also] a little bit amused by him. Because the nice thing about him coming into this group is that Lance doesn't really care that much of what people think of him. So he's very much himself and very comfortable in it. He doesn't bow down to the etiquette of the S.H.I.E.L.D. hierarchy."

Talking about Hunter's integration into the team following an offer from Coulson to become a full-time agent, Blood said, "I feel Hunter probably feels very independent, still, so I don't think he would like to admit that he's not an outsider, that he's a part of it....He doesn't have too much respect for authority and titles, particularly in this world, but I think he takes each decision as it comes. If Coulson does something he respects, that's all good. If he doesn't, he's going to say something. But I think he sees that [Coulson is] trying to do the right thing, and he's got a lot of respect for him in that sense". Also, on Hunter's on-again, off-again relationship with Morse, Blood said, "I think the dynamic's great. I think it's really good and there is a lot of truth in it of those relationships you have where it's kind of, "can't live with each other, can't kill each other," and that sort of thing." After Hunter kills a man in "A Wanted (Inhu)man", Blood said, "I think that's probably newer for the audience than it is for Hunter. I think Hunter, in his past, has probably done some morally questionable acts....not to say he's ever been a vicious, vindictive, or immoral person. I think he's just kind of straddled that line between right and wrong."

Blood left the series following the season three episode "Parting Shot" to star in the spin-off show Marvel's Most Wanted. As that series was not picked up in May 2016, it was announced in September 2017 that Blood would return to Agents of S.H.I.E.L.D. during season five. On where Hunter's been when he returns to help Fitz get to 2091 to rescue Coulson and the team, Blood said, "he's been up his usual tricks, doing some mercenary work and bickering with Bobbi.... He doesn't necessarily have access to all the bells-and-whistles and gadgetry that S.H.I.E.L.D. did, so he has to use his charm and his wit to break down doors, and call in a few favors from his dodgy friends".

=== Bobbi Morse ===
Barbara "Bobbi" Morse (portrayed by Adrianne Palicki) is Hunter's ex-wife and an agent of S.H.I.E.L.D. A founding member of the "real S.H.I.E.L.D." after disobeying Fury's orders to save hundreds of S.H.I.E.L.D. lives, she infiltrates Coulson's group for reconnaissance. Coulson sends her undercover within Hydra, where she gave up the location of Agent 33 rather than risk the lives of many other S.H.I.E.L.D. agents. She later agrees, along with her fellow "real S.H.I.E.L.D." leaders, to combine their faction with Coulson's. Ward then kidnaps her in an attempt to force her to confess to giving up 33 to Hydra, but when Morse is unrepentant, Ward sets a trap for Hunter which will see him killed in front of her. Morse takes the bullet for Hunter, barely surviving. Following an incident in Russia involving the near-assassination of Prime Minister Olshenko, Morse and Hunter decide to disavow themselves from S.H.I.E.L.D. to protect Coulson and the team.

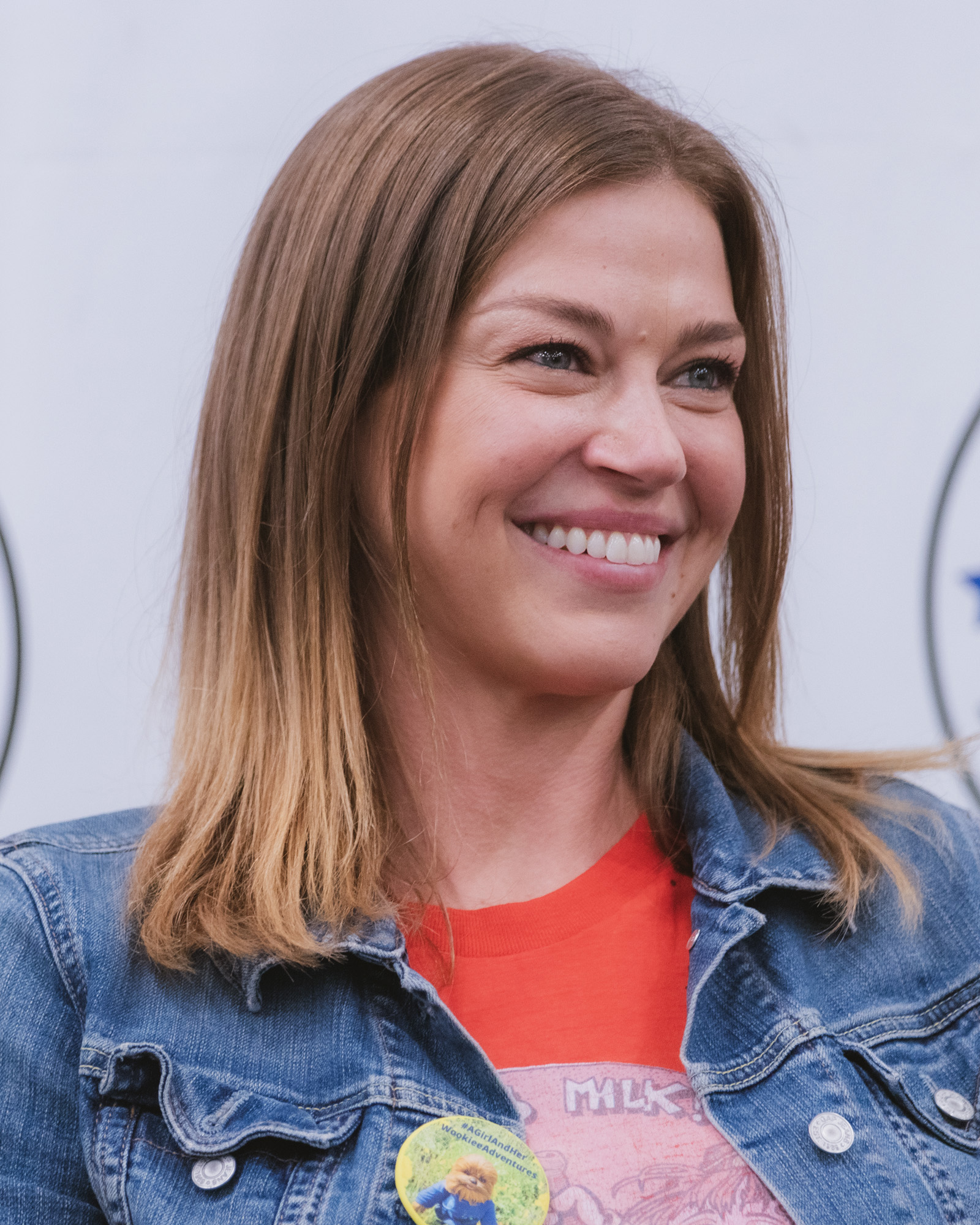
Adrianne Palicki

At the 2014 San Diego Comic-Con, the character of Bobbi Morse / Mockingbird, who was first introduced in Astonishing Tales #6 by Gerry Conway, was revealed to be appearing in the second season. That August, Palicki was cast as Morse in a guest role, to appear in the episode "A Hen in the Wolf House", but with the potential to return. Palicki, a comic fan, was approached by the showrunners specifically for the part, and at first hesitated to take the role, thinking "I will never be able to play another Marvel character if I go forward in this role." Palicki already had martial arts and gun training, but had to learn to use the character's signature arnis sticks, and noted similarities between Morse's fighting style and that of Scarlett Johansson's Black Widow from the MCU films. Palicki was promoted to series regular with the season two episode "Aftershocks".

In approaching Morse's costume, Foley "looked at all of her comic appearances and really wanted to try to bring elements of the look from the comics into the costume that we're doing now for the show...but we had to change it, obviously, for practicality, because it had to fit into our world. It had to have a kind of tactical feeling to it too so that it made sense in our universe. She's got rivets that are in the straps across her chest, and those are there as a tribute to the buttons that go down the side of her [most recent comics] costume". The character's comics costume is traditionally navy blue and white, which was changed to navy blue and grey for the series. Three sets of the costume were produced; two for Palicki to wear, and one for her stunt double. Foley used "lots of stretch panels" and leather to ensure freedom of movement in the character's many action sequences.

With the reveal of Morse's loyalty to the "real S.H.I.E.L.D." faction, Palicki explained that the character was "not doing anything wrong in her [own] eyes...This was a choice she made. She's been through hell with these people. She does care about Coulson's team. She's torn because of Hunter and she has a soft spot for Coulson. But at the end of it, she really is a true soldier and she feels there has been a compromise and she needs to take care of it." Bell, in response to a question on whether Morse had more secrets than those revealed during the second season, stated that "she and Hunter have been keeping secrets from one another, evidently for years. And one of the things I find interesting about her is she seems to be more of an ideologue—she's loyal to an idea—and sometimes, the short term of what appears to be betrayal or short term conflict is often because of what she views as the greater good. And that's an interesting character to have in a world where Coulson is much more "we need to protect or save that person." Are you loyal to a person? Are you loyal to the guy in the bunker next to you? Or are you loyal to the larger concept of what we're fighting for?"

When asked about her character potentially appearing in an MCU film, Palicki said "that was one of the things that was discussed when I was coming on for the part, and you know, we'll see what happens. It's such a nice world that we live in that crossover can happen so often now which in the past it never really did so, to see these worlds come together on the small screen and the big screen is really cool." Palicki left the series following the season three episode "Parting Shot" to star in the spin-off show Marvel's Most Wanted.

Palicki was named as an honorable mention for TVLine's "Performer of the Week" for the week of March 20, 2016, for her performance in "Parting Shot".

=== Alphonso "Mack" Mackenzie ===
Alphonso "Mack" Mackenzie (portrayed by Henry Simmons), a S.H.I.E.L.D. mechanic under Robert Gonzales, is a founding member of the "real S.H.I.E.L.D.", and infiltrates Coulson's group with Morse. After being briefly mind-controlled by Kree technology Mack's distrust in alien and the superhuman is deepened, and he decides to leave S.H.I.E.L.D. when his fellow leaders agree to join forces with Coulson. However, following the war with the Inhumans, Coulson convinces Mack to stay, and places him in charge of all alien materials. Coulson makes Mack acting director of S.H.I.E.L.D. when he goes after Ward and Hydra. In the Framework, Mack's daughter Hope is still alive. After being used by Hydra to reveal Johnson is from the real world, he seeks out the S.H.I.E.L.D. resistance to help them. When the exit point from the Framework is found, Mack chooses to stay behind, saying that the time he spent with the Framework version of Hope was real enough for him. He later leaves the Framework when Hope disappears amongst the Framework's collapse. After the death of Coulson, Mack becomes the new director of S.H.I.E.L.D. During the seventh season, Mack takes part in the mission to prevent the Chronicoms from rewriting history. One year after the mission's success, Mack continues to lead S.H.I.E.L.D. from a new Helicarrier.

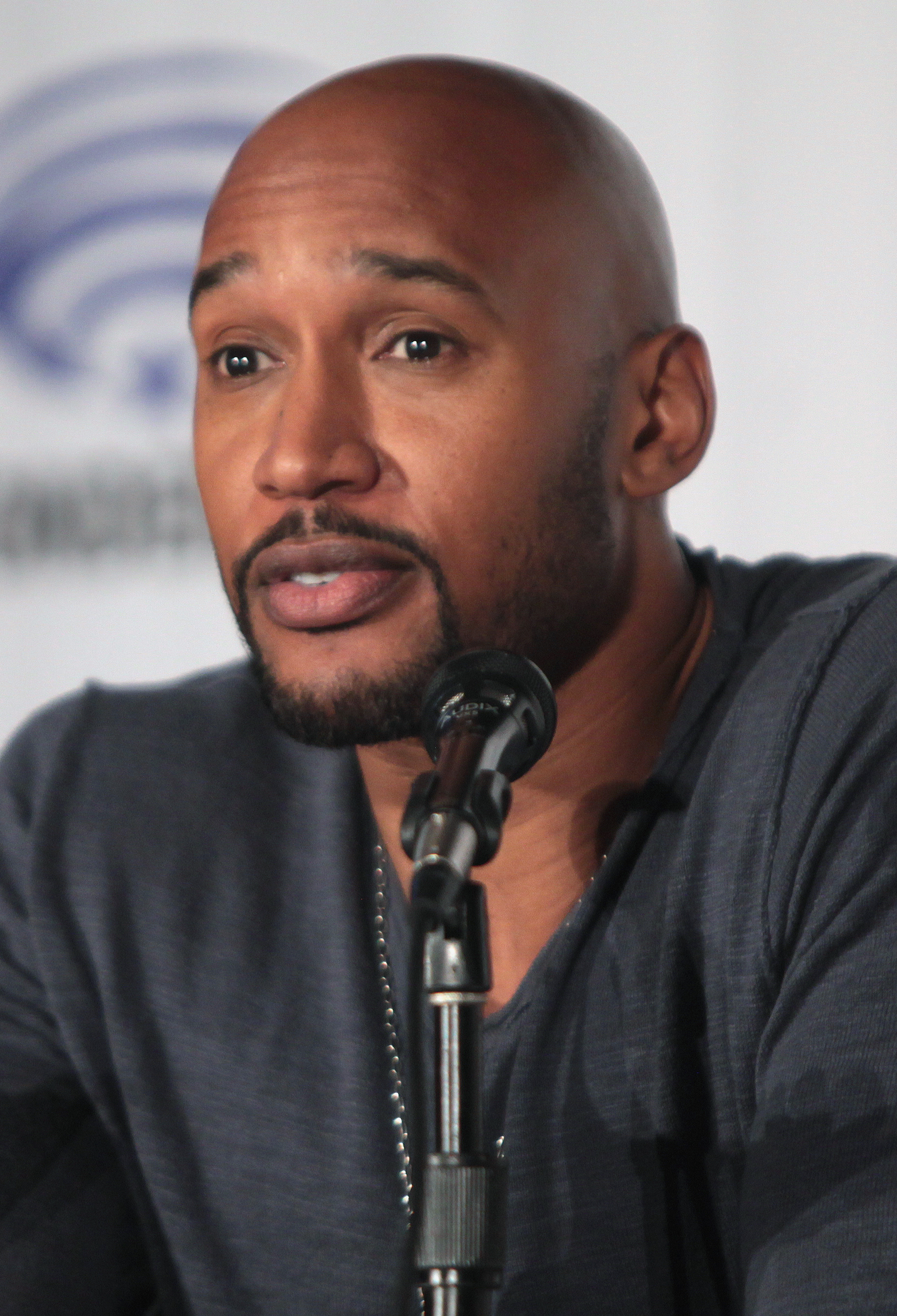
Henry Simmons

In August 2014, Simmons joined the cast as Mack, a recurring character inspired by one that first appeared in Nick Fury vs. S.H.I.E.L.D. #3. He was promoted to series regular for the third season.

Simmons described Mack as "a big guy. That is, he has a big heart, but when it comes down to it and business has to get done, there's another side of him that gets it done....He wants to make a difference, so that's why he wants to be a part of this team". On the different dynamic that a mechanic brings to the S.H.I.E.L.D. team, Simmons said "I think my guy does have a little bit of a different element, [because] the other people have the stress of the everyday life or death danger situations. Mack doesn't have that quite yet. He has the stress of getting things done because he wants to contribute, but he's not out there in the field....They might have their quips and everything, but everything is very serious. I see that my guy brings a little bit of a different color to everything. He has a little bit more humor to him, he's a little bit more laid back." On Mack's stance on violence, Simmons confirmed that "Mack really is a guy that does not like violence at all, but, when pushed, it's "by any means necessary." He doesn't enjoy it, but he'll do what he has to do."

After Mack's allegiance to the "real S.H.I.E.L.D." faction is revealed, and as his distrust of Coulson grew throughout the second season, Simmons spoke of Mack's feelings towards Coulson: "He respects Coulson. And I think he genuinely likes Coulson. But I think he just believes that Coulson is not the right man for the job....look, I'm loyal, but if the head is going about doing things that really aren't in our job description, and he's using us to do things for personal reasons, and then one of my brothers dies because of it? Yeah, I have a problem. And everyone else should, too....when Coulson is in his most crazed state and on the verge of killing Sebastian Derik, no one has ever seen Coulson like that. Skye witnessed it, but she has a different relationship to him; there's like a father/daughter thing going. So out of the whole team, I was the only one to see him like that, completely out of control. I tried to explain it to Hunter—if that happened in that instant, what's going to happen when everything is on the line? How is he going to act?—and Hunter kind of brushed it aside. But that's another reason why Mack is very, very deeply skeptical."

In season six, Mack becomes the new director of S.H.I.E.L.D. Simmons "love[d] the challenge of being the director of S.H.I.E.L.D." but felt "the one thing that can hinder Mack's ability to lead is his reluctance to put the people he loves in the line of danger," which leads to "Mack's toughest decision as director."

=== Lincoln Campbell ===
Lincoln Campbell (portrayed by Luke Mitchell) is an Inhuman doctor with the ability to control electric charges. He helps Skye adjust to her new life post-terrigenesis, and his later attempt to protect her from S.H.I.E.L.D. and Hydra leads to his capture and experimentation at the hands of Dr. List. Skye saves his life, and when she turns on Jiaying once realizing her true intentions, Campbell is shortly convinced to do the same. Following Jiaying's death, Campbell attempts to live a normal life, convinced that his Inhuman abilities are a curse, but is hunted by the ATCU and becomes a fugitive. He subsequently joins S.H.I.E.L.D. for protection and to be near Skye—now going by Daisy Johnson and with whom Campbell forms a relationship—and becomes a Secret Warrior. Campbell chooses to sacrifice himself to save the team and the world from Hive's plan by taking Hive and a nuclear warhead to space in a quinjet where the weapon can detonate without affecting Earth.

Daisy mentioned that Lincoln has a sister named Amanda who Daisy sends relief money to.

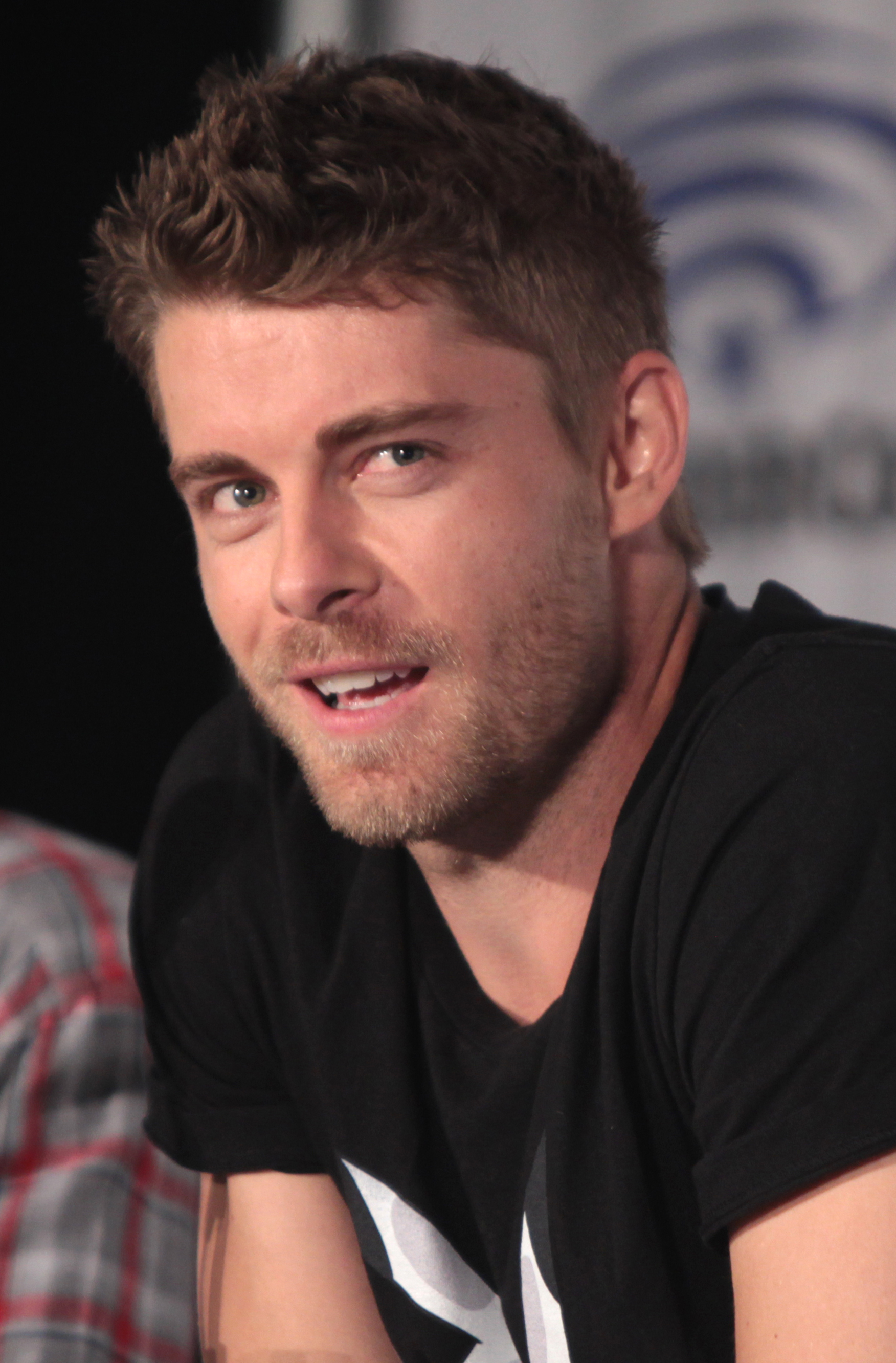
Luke Mitchell

Mitchell was introduced as Lincoln Campbell, a recurring character, in the second season. He was promoted to series regular for the third season. Regarding the character's introduction, Bell stated that "Meeting Luke's character in the Inhuman world is just setting up a new dynamic. We're taking Skye into a group with a whole bunch of different people. So far, we've seen that there's a guy with no eyes, and there's a woman who now is covered in thorns. And as in the X-Men world, there are a handful of people who look more like them, but a lot of them turn out to be just attractive people with powers. And we thought, "Hey, let's have some of those as well!" We were looking for a new character to come on, and Luke just really impressed us. He was a good actor, had a nice quality, and we felt he might be a good person to sort of usher Skye into this other world."

Heading into season three, Mitchell explained that "the Lincoln that the audience was introduced to in season two was a side of Lincoln, and that side of Lincoln was not necessarily a lie or the truth or whatever, but we all put on different faces in different environments...I think in that environment Lincoln was very much under the spell of the Inhuman Elders. He played his part in the hierarchy there and he believed in the cause, which then was exposed to be evil. Then in season three, it's like, wow, how is he dealing with the events in season two?" On seeing Lincoln's darker side in the third season, Mitchell said, "I think we're going to see a lot more of Lincoln's issues with his past pop up, in particular possibly some anger issues that have been unresolved. They pop their heads up from time to time. Certainly in matters of conflict, in pressure situations".

On the relationship that Campbell develops with Johnson, the only person who can "keep him somewhat in check when it comes to his anger", Mitchell said, "he wants to make something of his life, but he doesn't see anything without Daisy in the picture", and "if something were to happen to Daisy, I think Lincoln wouldn't stay in S.H.I.E.L.D. Daisy is his life. He'll do anything to get her back." This is seen when he agrees to wear a "murder vest" as a fail safe, and when he disobeys orders to test an experimental antitoxin on himself—"Once he does that, and it doesn't work, then they put him in the containment module for his own benefit, because his immune system is done. It becomes incredibly frustrating." Mitchell added, "He makes these decisions, but you still see the fear in him when he does this. It's not just bravado....There's a deep well of emotion in him."

The episode "Bouncing Back" opens with "a mysterious flash-forward to three months in the future, showing an unidentified S.H.I.E.L.D. agent seemingly dead in space", leading to a "four-episode event" for the final episodes of the season, marketed as Agents of S.H.I.E.L.D.: Fallen Agent. A poster created by Greg Land for the event recreated the cover of the "iconic" The Amazing Spider-Man #121 that served as the first issue of the story arc "The Night Gwen Stacy Died", and ahead of the season finale, Marvel released a series of videos that "memorialized" each of the potential character who could have been the Fallen Agent. The final episode of the season reveals that it is Campbell who dies, which the executive producers had known going into the season when forming the arcs for Lincoln, Daisy, and Ward. Bell said he "earned it", adding that Lincoln comes to a point where he realizes what his purpose is, with Whedon explaining that the decision was based on the fact that the series did not "want to be a body count show, but it is a real world with real stakes. What we had not done is the heroic death and the full-sacrifice death. This was a conscious decision. We also think that there's a poetry in the fact that the person doing it doesn't consider himself a hero. That's the beauty of the moment—it's not just for [Daisy], but it is, and it's not just for him, but it is."

=== Holden Radcliffe ===
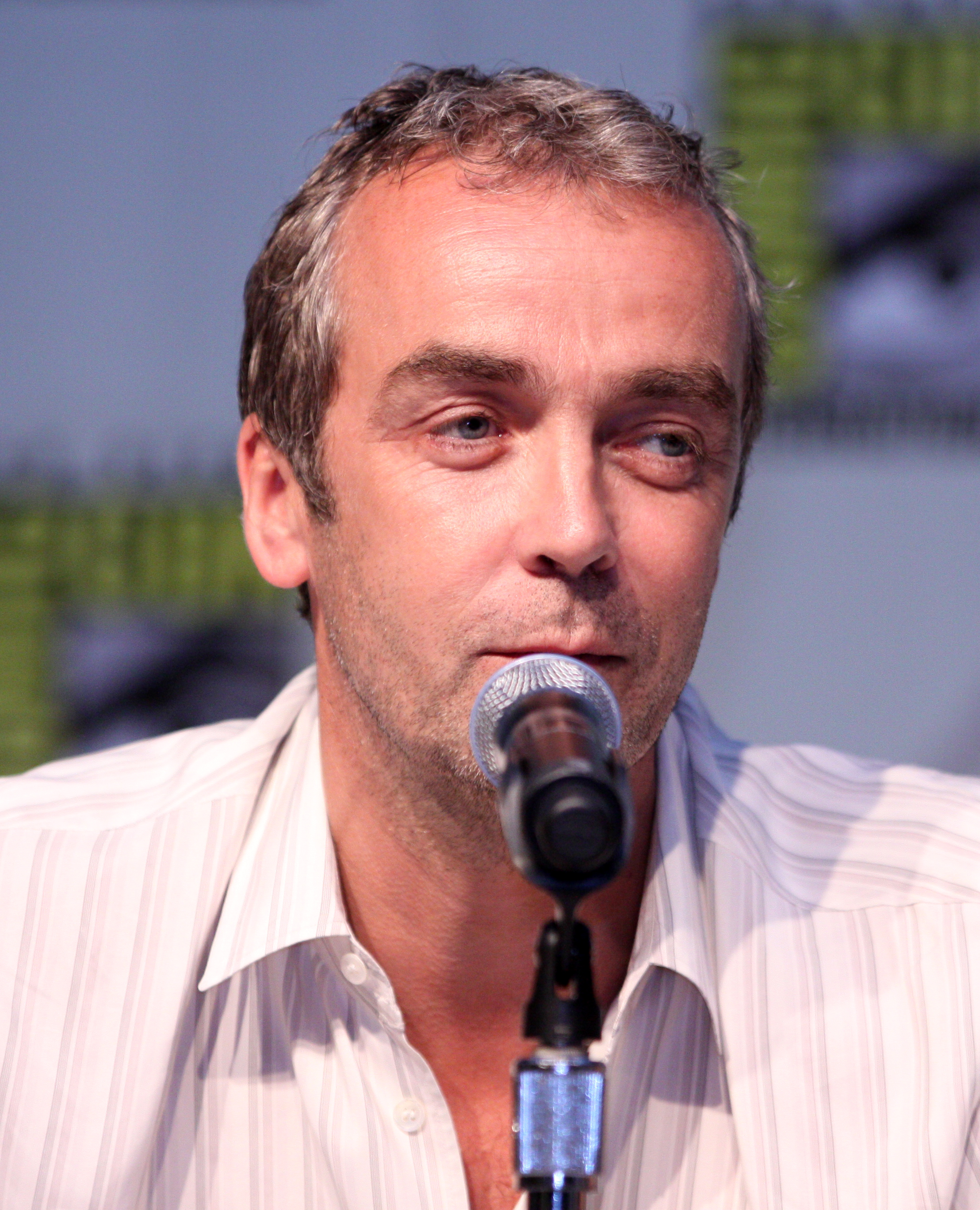
John Hannah

Holden Radcliffe (portrayed by John Hannah) is a transhumanist who believes in the improvement of humanity through enhancement. Due to his studies of parasites, Fitz and Simmons seek his help with counteracting Hive's abilities, but he is kidnapped by Hive first to help recreate the original Kree experiment that created the Inhumans. After a S.H.I.E.L.D. raid on Hive's base, Radcliffe escapes and agrees to cooperate with Coulson and Talbot. After being acquitted, Radcliffe transfers his artificial intelligence AIDA into a Life Model Decoy (LMD), an old S.H.I.E.L.D. project, which Radcliffe also names Aida. After seeing pages from the Darkhold, Radcliffe begins using his LMDs, including Aida and a decoy of May, to try and take it for himself in an attempt to learn the secret to eternal life. Fearing for his safety, Radcliffe also creates a decoy of himself, and seeks protection from the Watchdogs. Using the Darkhold and the resources of the Watchdogs' Superior, Racliffe creates an entire digital world within the Framework. Feeling that Radcliffe may one day jeopardize the Framework himself, Aida slits Radcliffe's wrists and uploads his mind to the Framework as his body dies. Within the Framework, his consciousness resided on Ogygia with Agnes in exchange for not interfering with Aida's work as Madame Hydra. After redeeming himself, Holden is deleted amongst the Framework's collapse.

Hannah recurred as Radcliffe during the end of the third season, before being promoted to the main cast for the fourth season. On Radcliffe transferring his artificial intelligence AIDA into a Life Model Decoy, Whedon said, "Radcliffe has a good heart, but he's willing to do anything for science. He's excited about the prospect. He said Fitz and Simmons had friends die and maybe they didn't have to. He's clearly opening a box. Whether or not it's Pandora's box, we'll see. He thinks there's something beyond humans." Tancharoen added, "To someone like Radcliffe, he might believe that to be just the next step in human evolution. There are a number of people who are into body modification now, so what does that mean? What's the root of that?"

Hannah felt portraying Radcliffe was "quite interesting", describing him as "someone who is not the up-down, white-hearted good guy" but still is not "a bad guy". He also noted the fatherly feelings Radcliffe has towards Aida, stating, "possibly as [their relationship] develops, as she proves there's almost a paternal... caring and sympathetic way in which that technology has developed self-awareness and how that self-awareness disappoints. A bit like you would with a child, where a child becomes aware of their own limitations, their own lackings. I would say there's certainly have a very benign kind of deity sense about it – a benign...not dictatorship about it, but a benign parental way about it."

=== Elena "Yo-Yo" Rodriguez ===
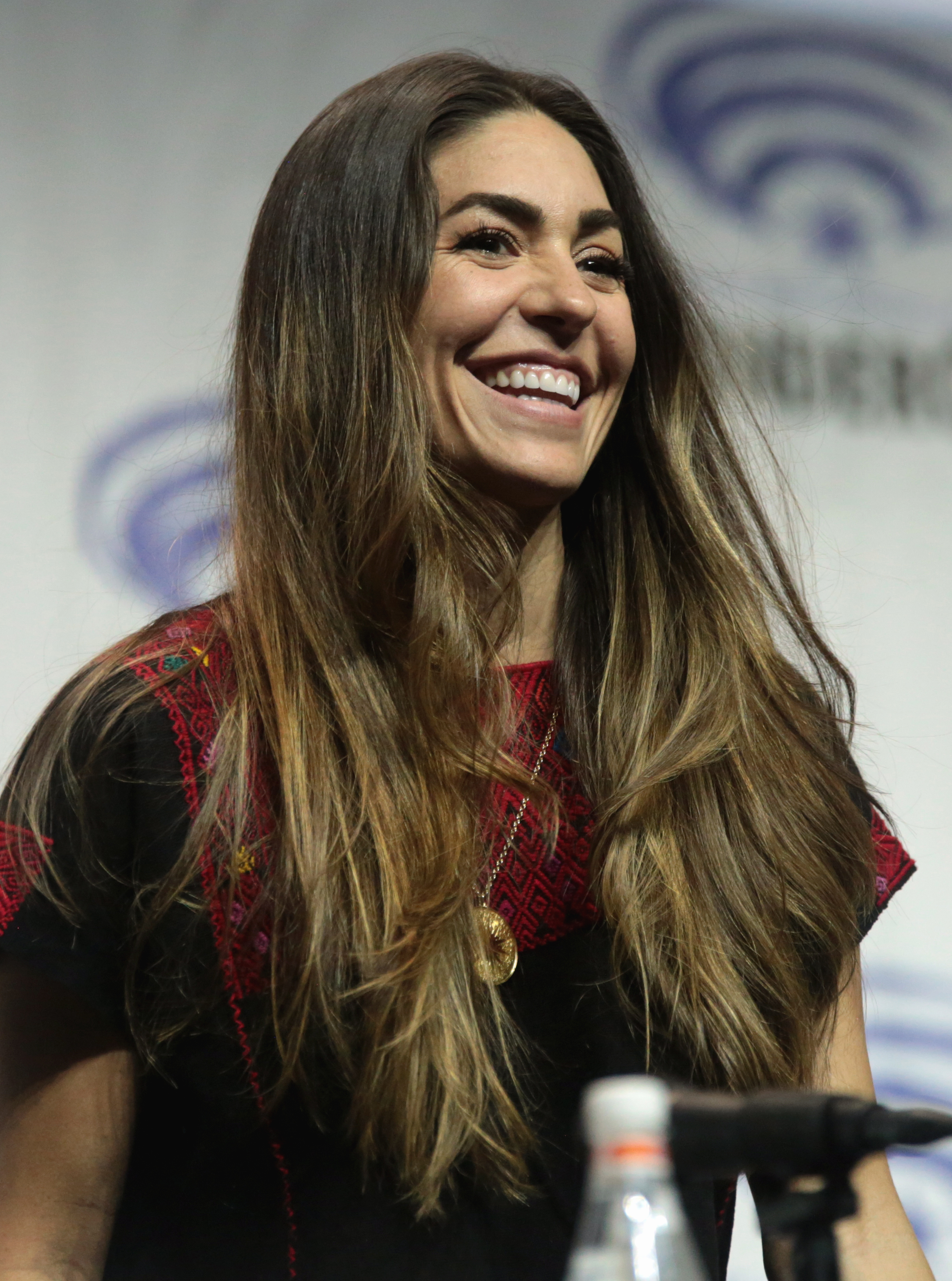
Natalia Cordova-Buckley

Elena Rodriguez (portrayed by Natalia Cordova-Buckley) is a Colombian Inhuman who can move at super-speed for the duration of a heart beat, before returning to the point she started moving from. At a young age, she lost her father to drug dealers and had to live with her uncle Oscar and cousin Francisco. When one of the drug dealers raided her uncle's house, she hid her grandmother's necklace, at the cost of her uncle's life. She comes into contact with S.H.I.E.L.D. when they investigate her for stealing weapons from the corrupt members of the National Police of Colombia after they killed Francisco. After joining the team, she grows close to Mack, who nicknames her "Yo-Yo" because of her powers. After signing the Sokovia Accords, Rodriguez returns to her life, with occasional monitoring by S.H.I.E.L.D. Rodriguez later helps Daisy Johnson and Jemma Simmons infiltrate the Framework. While helping the team defeat Izel, she became possessed by one of Izel's Shrikes before it dissolved upon her death. However, the experience left her unable to use her powers. As the team was traveling through time to defeat the Chronicoms, she visited a past version of Jiaying, who diagnosed her problem as the result of a mental block. Working with Melinda May, Rodriguez regained her powers and unlocked the ability to move at super-speed without bouncing back. Following the Chronicoms' defeat, she became one of S.H.I.E.L.D.'s top agents working with Agents Piper and Davis.

By February 2016, Cordova-Buckley was cast as "Yo-Yo" Rodriguez, based on the comic Secret Warrior of the same name. Cordova-Buckley learned of the role after she had been cast in the series, and subsequently researched the comics for inspiration. She described the character, as she is initially introduced in the series, as a freedom fighter who "in a lot of ways she wants to help her people in Colombia and she wants to do good with her powers and she makes sure that she's very adamant on how she goes about things." She also noted the rarity of the character's spirituality, saying that she "has this whole spiritual connection to her powers which is rare to ever see in a super hero movie...She wants to use [her powers] as what she calls a blessing and a gift from God to help others, so it's a very unique approach to it all". When first portraying the character, Cordova-Buckley smiled whenever Rodriguez was about to use her abilities, to show an adrenaline rush and the feeling of having such power. After positive fan responses to this, the actress morphed this trait into a more mischievous personality for the character. Before the start of the fifth season, it was revealed that Cordova-Buckley had been promoted to series regular. Sofia Rabe-Martinez portrays a younger Elena.

=== Deke Shaw ===
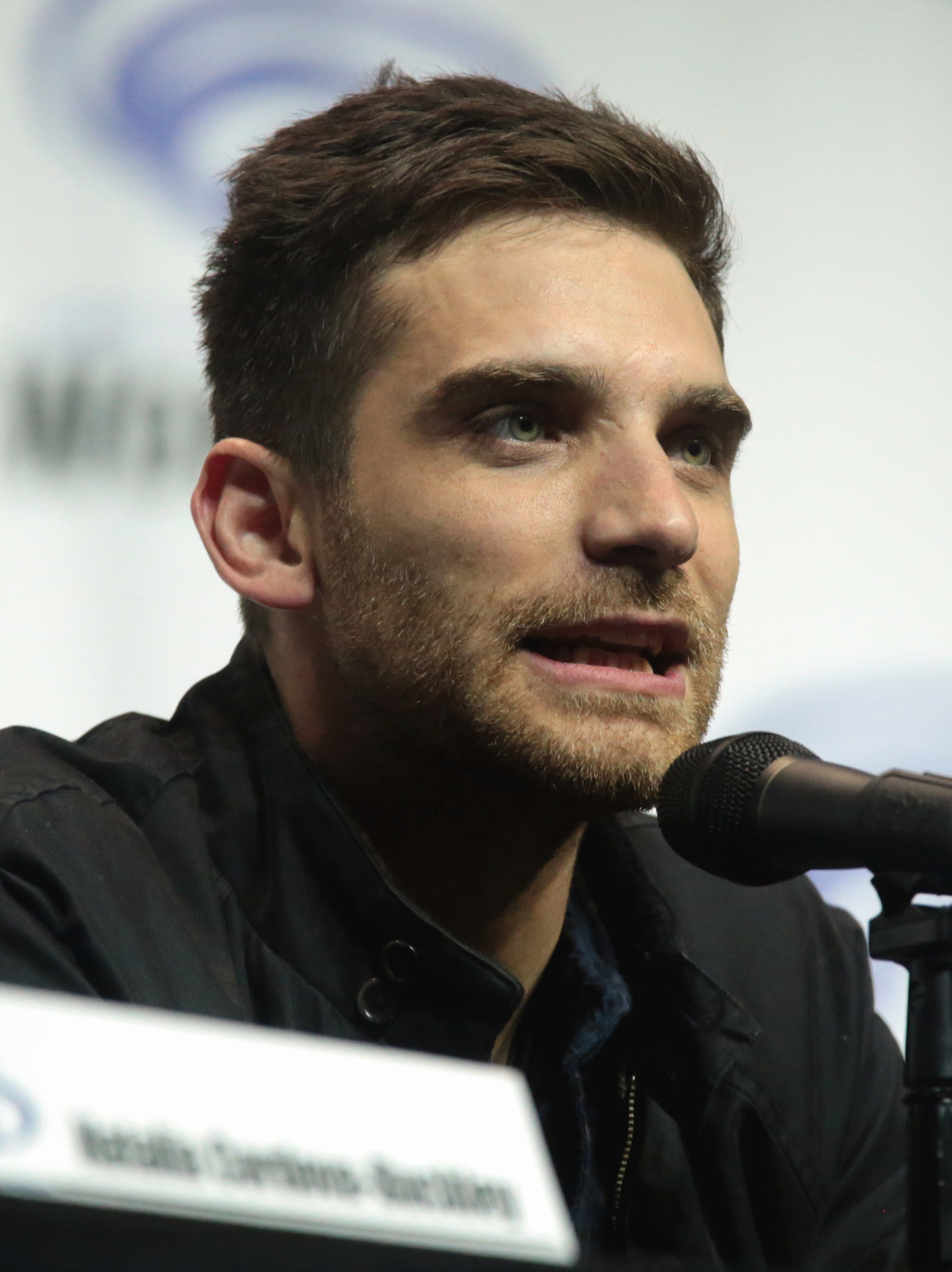
Jeff Ward

Deke Shaw (portrayed by Jeff Ward) is "the ultimate survivor" and a "roguish scavenger" on the space station Lighthouse in the year 2091. With a sharp mind and quick wit, he has the ability to acquire items for a price. During the final battle with the Kree Kasius, Enoch and Deke sacrifice their lives to get Phil Coulson's team back to their own time. However, Deke was sent to the present with Coulson and found by Daisy. He later realizes that he is Fitz and Simmons' grandson. Following the battle with the gravitonium-enhanced Glenn Talbot, Deke leaves S.H.I.E.L.D.

In season six, Deke establishes a tech company by "borrowing" S.H.I.E.L.D. tech to make new innovations, such as using the Framework as a virtual reality video game. Despite this, S.H.I.E.L.D. kept tabs on him via Agent Trevor Khan, who worked undercover as his partner. Deke was targeted by Sarge's group, who mistook him for a Shrike carrier due to his strange readings before he was rescued by Mack and May. While helping the S.H.I.E.L.D. team thwart Sarge's plan to nuke Izel's shrikes, Deke fell in love with Sarge's associate Snowflake after Sarge abandoned her for the sake of his revenge.

In season seven, Deke assists the S.H.I.E.L.D. team in stopping the Chronicoms from changing history before eventually volunteering to stay behind in an alternative timeline to help them return to theirs. Despite this, he becomes the new director of S.H.I.E.L.D. while working undercover as a rock star.

Ward was cast in August 2017; his role was announced in November 2017. Ward had originally been cast as Virgil, a character who dies in the first episode. During the table read of the episode, the main cast felt Ward "nailed it" as Virgil and wanted him to stay on as Deke, who had not yet been cast. The producers reached out to Ward after the reading to audition for Deke, and was ultimately cast in the part.

At San Diego Comic-Con in 2018, it was revealed that Ward had been promoted to a series regular for the sixth season.

== Recurring characters ==
The following is a list of guest characters that have recurring roles throughout the series. The characters are listed by the MCU media or season in which they first appeared.

=== Introduced in films ===
==== Gideon Malick ====
Gideon Malick (portrayed by Powers Boothe) is a former member of the World Security Council and secret leader of Hydra who ascended to power following the death of his father Wilfred in 1970. Gideon was joined by his brother Nathaniel, but the two soon learned of a trick their father used to avoid being sacrificed to Hive, and when Gideon followed suit, Nathaniel was sacrificed. Gideon successfully opens the portal to allow Hive to return to Earth, but Hive reveals that he has retained Nathaniel's memories, and punishes Gideon by killing his daughter Stephanie. After being captured by S.H.I.E.L.D., Gideon cooperates with Coulson against Hive. Gideon is killed by Daisy Johnson while she is controlled by Hive.

In October 2015, it was announced that Boothe was joining the series as a recurring character early in the third season, reprising his role from The Avengers (where he was credited only as "World Security Council"). On how much the series would use the character later in the third season, following the midseason finale, Whedon stated that "we'd be fools not to use him more. We couldn't be bigger fans of [Boothe's] portrayal of the role. We knew going in that we were going to get some bang for our buck, and we've been loving writing the character. We love the way he's attacking the scenes. We plan on keeping him around, because we'd be idiots not to." Cameron Palatas portrays a young Gideon Malick.

=== Introduced in other television series ===
==== Daniel Sousa ====
Daniel Sousa (portrayed by Enver Gjokaj) is the head of S.H.I.E.L.D.'s Los Angeles office. As a Strategic Scientific Reserve (SSR) agent, he was an ally of Peggy Carter. He sports a prosthetic leg and uses a crutch to get around.

=== Introduced in season one ===
==== Mike Peterson / Deathlok ====
Michael "Mike" Peterson (portrayed by J. August Richards) is an ordinary man who was artificially enhanced with the Extremis-containing Centipede serum by Project Centipede. Peterson later joins S.H.I.E.L.D, but is caught in an explosion and awakens without his right leg and under the control of the "Clairvoyant", who gives him a bionic prosthetic limb as part of "Project Deathlok". After the defeat of Centipede and the "Clairvoyant", Peterson works for Coulson covertly, and aids in the take down of Hydra leader Dr. List. Peterson later returned with some S.H.I.E.L.D. agents to help Phil Coulson seal the rift in the Lighthouse that was leaking different fears from it. Afterwards, he attended Fitz and Simmons' wedding.

Richards appeared in Joss Whedon's Angel as Charles Gunn before being cast as Peterson, who was revealed to be the MCU version of Deathlok in January 2014. Created by Rich Buckler and Doug Moench in 1974, Deathlok has gone through many different iterations in the comics. Richards called the role "a dream come true", and described the character's costume and makeup, which took "about five departments...two hours to do the makeup and then [about] 15 or 20 minutes to get into the costume", as "restrictive. I love the costume and it really helps me to play the character, because it makes me feel part-machine, part-human." Deathlok's costume was designed by costume designer Ann Foley, with illustrator Phillip Boutte Jr. designing the armor and weapons. Foley also worked closely with Marvel CCO Joe Quesada, who helped finalize the design before it was sent to Film Illusions to be created. The costume also had to be enhanced with visual effects, including the addition of a robotic leg and an arm mounted rocket launcher, as well as a half metal plated skull with robotic eye for when Deathlok is seen with x-ray vision. The costume was updated and evolved to be closer to the comic version for Deathlok's appearance in the second season.

Richards found "the theme of Deathlok [to be] about deep, internal conflict, and that's what we're bringing with this [version]." Richards was inspired by Frankenstein to portray the character's "fall into a dark place". After returning late in the second season, Richards looked back, and felt that his initial awkwardness and reluctance with the character and the costume reflected Peterson's own journey becoming Deathlok. He also noted that when the character says "Mike Peterson is dead", "the only way that line could have meaning [is] if it were not true. I always think of Mike Peterson being at the core of this character, and whatever happens as a result of that, is all Mike Petersen."

==== Ian Quinn ====
Ian Quinn (portrayed by David Conrad) is a wealthy industrialist/philanthropist and the CEO of Quinn Worldwide and a former partner of Franklin Hall who is involved with The Clairvoyant. He acquires Deathlok technology for Mike Peterson and attempts to sell more Deathlok soldiers to the U.S. military.

After Garrett is defeated, Quinn is absorbed into the gravitonium by Raina as seen in a flashback in season five.

==== Raina ====
Raina (portrayed by Ruth Negga) was raised by Calvin Johnson, and grew up with stories of her heritage as an Inhuman, and her potential to be more. Becoming the Project Centipede recruiter due to her interest in powered people, Raina works with Hydra in an attempt to replicate the GH-325 serum that was used to resurrect Coulson. She eventually goes through Terrigenesis, gaining the power of precognition, but also a monstrous appearance. Raina comes to accept her new circumstances, and later allows Jiaying to kill her so that Skye can learn of the former's true intent. It was later revealed that Raina had the gravitonium absorb Ian Quinn.

Negga was first cast as a guest star in October 2013, with executive producer Jeffrey Bell later explaining that "Ruth Negga showed up and we just fell in love with her and found ways to use her beyond our initial conception". Negga had originally auditioned to play Simmons, and when the part of Raina came about, the producers knew Negga would be perfect for the role. Foley was informed of Raina ahead of time, allowing her to flesh out the character with illustrations, as well as print specific fabric. When Raina is introduced in "Girl in the Flower Dress", Foley and Negga "wanted to show a progression in her dresses that reflects where her character might be going", with her initially unclear intentions paired with "a softer silhouette" and a pattern of white with black flowers. For her second appearance in the episode, "it's becoming clear that she has an agenda" so the dress is more streamlined, and the colors are flipped to black with white flowers. For her final appearance in the episode, her dress is red with black flowers. Foley concluded, "By the time you see her again in ["The Bridge"] you know she means business". For her appearance in "The Bridge", Foley added leather to her dress to give it "more of an edge". Each dress is custom-made from specific fabric and has a different silhouette. Foley also worked with Tancharoen to match the color of the dresses to the episode's themes. After Raina is transformed in the second season she hides her hideous appearance with a hooded jacket, which Foley subtly added a flower pattern to, as "she was always going to be the girl in the flower dress, so I wanted to pay tribute to that".

Raina's Inhuman look was created by Glenn Hetrick of Optic Nerve Studios. To get to the final look, the writers spent a lot of time discussing what her transformed look would entail, such as if she would have a nose, or a tail, with series writer Drew Greenberg eventually suggesting thorns. With the design idea in hand, Hetrick and his team began compiling potential designs for the character, looking to the Clive Barker film Nightbreed, specifically the character Shuna Sassi, because "She's a creature covered in porcupine quills and that image is so strong — it creates such a striking silhouette". Since Hetrick and his team did not have source material to pull from in the comics, he wanted to "make her feel like the first real Inhuman" and give her face a level of symmetry. When creating the prosthetic makeup, which was done in two weeks, the producers wanted to still be able to see Negga's eyes, with Bell saying, "Ruth Negga has amazingly expressive eyes and eyebrows. And she gets so much of who Raina is through the eyes. We wanted her to still be able to communicate, we still wanted you to feel her expressions through all of [the makeup]."

==== Victoria Hand ====
Victoria Hand (portrayed by Saffron Burrows as an adult and Rachele Schank as a young woman) is introduced as the high-ranking S.H.I.E.L.D. agent who runs The Hub, a S.H.I.E.L.D. base. After discovering that Hydra exists within S.H.I.E.L.D., Hand turns on Coulson, believing him to be a double agent. However, Garrett soon reveals himself to be the traitor, and Hand works with Coulson to detain him. She is killed by Ward when he reveals himself to be a member of Hydra to save Garrett from imprisonment.

In 1983, a past version of Hand survived a Chronicom attack on S.H.I.E.L.D., regrouped in a New York safe house in The Krazy Kanoe with other surviving agents, and contributed to helping the present day agents return to their time.

In November 2013, Burrows was announced as playing Hand, who was created by Brian Michael Bendis and Mike Deodato, and played an integral role in their Dark Avengers comic book series. Tancharoen was "very focused" on having Burrows look like the comics version of the character, with Burrows getting the red streaks in her hair on her own before arriving to film. Writer Rafe Judkins added Burrows had "one of [the] most successful comic-book character looks on the show". The character was intentionally introduced in the first season as a mislead for the true identity of the Clairvoyant. With the introduction of Lucy Lawless as Isabelle Hartley in the second season, the executive producers considered establishing a relationship between Hand and Hartley, since the comic book-counterpart of Hand was in a relationship with a character called Isabelle, but Tancharoen stated that "it started to be irresponsible if we addressed it to not address it with more weight and time and energy." However, this relationship was later hinted at on-screen in "One Door Closes".

==== Davis ====
Davis (portrayed by Maximilian Osinski) is a S.H.I.E.L.D. agent who worked alongside Phil Coulson's group to investigate an explosion at StatiCorp's Particle Accelerator Complex before the Hydra Uprising. He later returned to S.H.I.E.L.D. after Jeffrey Mace became its director. After LMDs infiltrated the Playground, Davis and a few surviving S.H.I.E.L.D. agents help Daisy Johnson and Jemma Simmons escape and protect them while they infiltrate the Framework to save their friends. After Ophelia attacks Davis, Mike Peterson saves him and later reunites him with Coulson's fugitive team at the Lighthouse. Davis later assisted in the search for Fitz and Enoch. During Izel's raid of the Lighthouse, she possessed Davis' body and manipulated him into falling to his death. One year after the Chronicoms' defeat, an LMD version of Davis works alongside Agent Piper and Yo-Yo Rodriguez on a mission.

==== Anne Weaver ====
Anne Weaver (portrayed by Christine Adams) is the director of the S.H.I.E.L.D. Academy of Science and Technology. Following the fall of the original organization in which she fought one of Hydra's enhanced soldiers until she was saved by Tomas Calderon, she joins the leadership of the "real S.H.I.E.L.D." Anne takes over command of the S.H.I.E.L.D. warship The Iliad following the death of Robert Gonzales.

==== John Garrett / The Clairvoyant ====
John Garrett (portrayed by Bill Paxton as an adult, James Paxton as a young man) was a S.H.I.E.L.D. agent who was left for dead, only to survive after becoming the first Deathlok. Joining Hydra, he became "The Clairvoyant", leader of the Centipede group, and dedicated himself to discovering the secret to Coulson's resurrection given the impending failure of his now outdated Deathlok technology. Under the guise of a S.H.I.E.L.D. agent tasked with capturing and interrogating Ian Quinn, Garrett joins in Coulson's efforts to find the GH-325 drug. Based on his findings, Raina is able to synthesize a version of the drug, which saves his life. However, after Hydra is revealed to have infiltrated S.H.I.E.L.D. and Garrett is outed as the Clairvoyant, Coulson kills him.

In 1983, Nathaniel Malick swayed a young John Garrett to his side and used the Time Stream to show him his future. When the Phil Coulson L.M.D. and Gordon are captured by Nathaniel's mercenaries, Garrett undergoes a blood transfusion to acquire Gordon's teleporting powers, which he uses to assist Nathaniel in his plans, such as kidnapping Jemma Simmons to locate Leo Fitz. After the Chronicoms destroy most of S.H.I.E.L.D.'s bases, Garrett teleports to the Lighthouse and plants explosives. However, Coulson, Yo-Yo, and May trap him in an anti-teleportation device in an attempt to force Nathaniel to call off the base's destruction. He chooses to leave Garrett for dead, though he survives the explosion and sides with S.H.I.E.L.D. Garrett teleports his new allies to a New York safe house, only to be killed by Victoria Hand, who mistook him for a threat.

In December 2013, "a high-level S.H.I.E.L.D. agent/munitions expert who has past ties to both Coulson and Ward" was set to be added to the series. The next month, Paxton was cast as Agent John Garrett, "a rough-and-tumble former cohort of Agent Coulson with a little bit of attitude and cigar-smoking swagger". Garrett was first introduced by Frank Miller and Bill Sienkiewicz in Elektra: Assassin. Jed Whedon said that "We actually discussed Bill Paxton in the room, when we were talking about the character ... Then when he came up as an actual possibility, we couldn't believe it." Following the revelation that Garrett was The Clairvoyant, Paxton said, "He's felt like he's found a true home in Hydra, which is more of a Darwinian outfit. It's survival of the fittest. He can relate to that."

==== Antoine Triplett ====
Antoine Triplett (portrayed by B. J. Britt) worked with Garrett until the Hydra reveal, after which he joins Coulson's team. Trip perishes when he becomes trapped in the chamber Skye and Raina undergo Terrigenesis in and gets hit by a fragment of the Diviner. In the Framework, Antoine Triplett is Jeffrey Mace's inside man who got caught and was incarcerated at a Hydra Cultivation Enlightenment Camp until he was freed by Mace and Phil Coulson.

In December 2013, "an African-American agent who specializes in combat/weapons" was set to be added to the series. In February, Britt was announced as cast in the role of Triplett. Britt's smile and charm were incorporated into the character after he had worked with the writers for several episodes, with Tancharoen saying to Britt "I love your smile. We have to incorporate the smile of Trip into the show." Britt said of the character, "Trip likes to make sure everything is in order...he's going make sure that stuff doesn't go wrong. [But] I still feel like Trip has something to prove. That's going to cross over to the second season where Trip wants to show Coulson that he can trust him." Britt returned in the fourth season to reprise the character within the Framework reality.

==== Glenn Talbot / Graviton ====
Glenn Talbot (portrayed by Adrian Pasdar) is a United States Air Force colonel and later brigadier general who hunts active S.H.I.E.L.D. agents after the organization's disbandment. Coulson earns his trust over time, and the two soon enter an agreement in which S.H.I.E.L.D. provides the government with sensitive assets and helps with the take down of Hydra in exchange for being left alone. He is made head of the Advanced Threat Containment Unit (ATCU) following the death of Rosalind Price, an arrangement which sees him reluctantly working for Coulson. Glenn Talbot is later placed in a coma following a head shot caused by the Daisy Johnson LMD at a government meeting. Talbot was later revealed to be a prisoner of General Hale until Coulson managed to free him. However, upon calling his wife Carla, Hale's subordinate Candice Lee forces her to read a script to activate his brainwashing that occurred during his imprisonment. Talbot eventually enters the Rebirth machine to absorb gravitonium, becoming Graviton. He finds Robin Hinton so she can tell him where the gravitonium within the Earth is located. During his fight with Johnson, Talbot is blasted into space after Johnson takes the Centipede Serum where his body becomes frozen in ice.

Created by Stan Lee and Steve Ditko for Tales to Astonish #61, Talbot was a recurring antagonist of the Hulk. Pasdar was cast as Talbot by March 2014, with this version focused on taking down Hydra. In the fifth season, Talbot becomes the villain Graviton, despite the series previously introducing Franklin Hall in the first season, the character who becomes the villain in the comics.

==== The Koenigs ====
Eric, Billy, Sam, and Thurston Koenig (all portrayed by Patton Oswalt) are quadruplets. The first three are S.H.I.E.L.D. agents, programmers in the initial S.H.I.E.L.D. LMD program.

- Eric was stationed at the Providence base and assisted Coulson in the wake of Hydra's emergence, but was killed by Ward.
- Billy and Sam were stationed at the Playground base where Coulson and his team went after Hydra's emergence. Billy and Sam worked with Coulson on the Theta Protocol, maintaining a S.H.I.E.L.D. helicarrier for Nick Fury. Later, Coulson entrusted the Darkhold to Billy and Sam, who hid the book in the Labyrinth, a S.H.I.E.L.D. base only accessible by the Koenigs.
- Thurston is a slam poet activist who is not a S.H.I.E.L.D. agent and refers to them as a bunch of "sheep" due to Eric's death.
- Ernest "Hazard" Koenig, the Koenigs' grandfather, again portrayed by Oswalt, is the proprietor of a speakeasy underneath a post office in 1931 that will become an S.S.R. asset in the future. After S.H.I.E.L.D. agents came to his time and told him about the future, Koenig attempted to stop his employee, Freddy Malick, from getting involved with Hydra, only to get shot. While recuperating, he hired a stranded Enoch in exchange for information on how he and his speakeasy will go on to help S.H.I.E.L.D. in the future.

Oswalt joined the series as Eric Koenig in March 2014. This version of the character is loosely inspired by one that first appeared in Sgt. Fury and his Howling Commandos #27. Oswalt also portrays Eric's brothers and grandfather. After previously working on Joss Whedon's Dollhouse and being a long time fan of Marvel, Oswalt was sought for the part specifically.

==== Calvin Johnson ====
Calvin Johnson (portrayed by Kyle MacLachlan), a young doctor, met the Inhuman Jiaying while in China. The two eventually married, and had a daughter, Daisy. After Jiaying was torn apart by Hydra, and Daisy was taken by S.H.I.E.L.D. agents, Cal stitched his wife back together, found innocent people whose life-force was used to bring Jiaying back to life, and began searching for his daughter, at some point changing his last name. He also began experimenting on himself in an attempt to be stronger, blaming himself for not protecting his family. Jiaying eventually abandoned the search to live a peaceful life with other Inhumans like her, but Cal continued, eventually meeting Daisy—now going by Skye—and over time forming a bond with her, despite her hatred for his past actions. Coulson later convinces Cal that Jiaying is a monster who has forced him to do terrible things, and when Jiaying starts a war with S.H.I.E.L.D. that leads to a face down with Skye, Cal kills Jiaying. S.H.I.E.L.D. then wipes Cal's memory to allow him to live a peaceful life.

During the first-season finale, Skye's father is briefly seen from behind, portrayed by a stand-in. In August 2014, MacLachlan was cast in the role, to recur throughout the second season. Initially referred to as "The Doctor", his character was revealed to be Calvin Zabo, also known as Mister Hyde, in December 2014. Zabo was created by Stan Lee and Don Heck for Journey into Mystery in 1963, and is influenced by Robert Louis Stevenson's The Strange Case of Dr. Jekyll and Mr. Hyde. MacLachlan's makeup for his transformation into the Mister Hyde persona in the second-season finale took around two and a half hours to apply. Following the conclusion of season two, Bell said on Cal's storyline, "He got to live a happily ever after in a beautiful way. We would never write off the idea of finding more story for him down the road, but we had a great time with Kyle this year and feel like that was a story that ended nicely." Bell elaborated that they "felt like everything he did came from the right place but that he was just a really horrible, broken man. The idea of [using] the T.A.H.I.T.I. program to reset him as the good person that has always been in there was too good to pass up."

=== Introduced in season two ===
==== Werner Reinhardt / Daniel Whitehall ====
Werner Reinhardt (portrayed by Reed Diamond), a high ranking Nazi officer and an elite member of Hydra in 1945, was experimenting on the Diviner when his base was taken by the SSR and he was imprisoned for life. Released by Alexander Pierce in 1988, Reinhardt discovered that a woman unaffected by the Diviner, Jiaying, had apparently not aged in four decades. Dissecting her, Reinhardt discovered the secret to her youthfulness and used it to de-age himself. Taking the name Daniel Whitehall, he became the North American leader of Hydra following Pierce's death. While serving as leader, he helped General Hale train Hydra's next leader and fought Coulson's S.H.I.E.L.D. team while maintaining his interest in the Diviner and other alien matters. He is killed by Coulson while trying to unlock the Diviner.

At San Diego Comic-Con in July 2014, Diamond was announced as portraying Daniel Whitehall, also known as the Kraken in the comics, where he was introduced by Jonathan Hickman for Secret Warriors #7. Diamond previously worked with the creators on Dollhouse and Much Ado About Nothing, and though they had wanted him for parts throughout the first season, he had been unavailable due to commitments to another series. Diamond accepted the role of Whitehall with just 24 hours to prepare, during which he formed the character's German accent to use for flashback sequences. In developing the character, Diamond watched Nazi documentaries, and re-watched Marvel's films, looking at the characters of Loki and Red Skull in particular. From the former, Diamond was inspired by his The Avengers quote, "I am burdened with glorious purpose", as he had never played a super villain, "someone who really believed that they were the best person to rule the universe, or at least the Earth." For Hugo Weaving's portrayal of the Red Skull, Diamond looked at his anger and voice to see "how [Whitehall] would fit in within that spectrum", and settled on "this is TV. I'm the smiling, calm, villain." Diamond also sought advice from Malcolm McDowell, who told him to "Always smile and let the lines do the work." The character is often seen cleaning his glasses, an "identifying quality" devised by Jed Whedon.

==== Sunil Bakshi ====
Sunil Bakshi (portrayed by Simon Kassianides), the right-hand man to Whitehall, is instrumental in the brainwashing of Hydra's subjects, including S.H.I.E.L.D. agent Kara Palamas, who later gets revenge by brainwashing Bakshi herself. Now loyal to Palamas and Ward, Bakshi sacrifices his life to save the latter when Simmons tries to kill him.

In the Framework, Sunil Bakshi is a news presenter who hosts The Bakshi Report where he reports on Hydra's actions against the S.H.I.E.L.D. resistance.

Kassianides, a fan of the series and of comic books in general, was cast in the "major recurring role" of Bakshi in July 2014. The producers intended for Bakshi to be killed off in the fifth episode of the second season, but changed their minds after Kassianides' early table reads and extended his run on the show through to the nineteenth episode. Speaking of the character's relationship with Whitehall, Kassianides explained, "Bakshi really feels he can act under the authority of Whitehall on his own, using his own judgment. He has the trust of Whitehall and is acting as he sees fit, the consequences of which will play out." On Bakshi's motivations and thought process, Kassianides said "When you're that committed to any ideology, I think that it allows for elements of insanity ... whether that's been trained in him or it's inherent, it's not clear, but he's certainly at that point where hurting people, torturing people, and operating under this ideology is something he quite enjoys."

==== Carl Creel ====
Carl Creel (portrayed by Brian Patrick Wade) is a Hydra operative recruited by Garrett and brainwashed by Whitehall who can absorb the properties of whatever he touches. He is later hired by Talbot to serve as his bodyguard, but quits when Talbot is injured and hospitalized. Sometime later, Creel is hired by General Hale to help her hunt S.H.I.E.L.D., but he betrays her after learning she is holding Talbot prisoner, helping Coulson and Talbot escape. Creel also forms a mental link with gravitonium and discovers that the minds of Franklin Hall and Ian Quinn live on inside it after it absorbed them. While recuperating in the hospital, Creel is visited by Glenn Talbot, who absorbs Creel into himself with his gravitonium.

Wade was cast in the role in August 2014.

==== Kara Palamas / Agent 33 ====
Kara Palamas (portrayed by Maya Stojan) was a S.H.I.E.L.D. agent betrayed to Hydra by the then undercover Morse and subjected to brainwashing by Bakshi and Whitehall. The now Hydra-loyal Palamas used a nanomask to take on the appearance of May, and when the latter electrocutes Palamas whilst in this disguise, she is left stuck as May, but deformed. After Coulson kills Whitehall, Palamas works with Ward, the two forming a romantic relationship while the latter does everything in his power to bring Palamas "closure". They get her nanomask repaired so that she can become whoever she wishes, brainwash Bakshi, and kidnap Morse in an attempt to force a confession out of her. When May and Hunter come to rescue Morse, Ward accidentally kills Palamas while she is in disguise as May.

While Stojan portrays Palamas, the character is also portrayed by other cast members, including Ming-Na Wen and Chloe Bennet, when she takes on the appearance of their characters. Stojan had to balance working on the series with her concurrent recurring role on Castle, but was still able to appear in every episode offered to her. Speaking about portraying Palamas, and the differences between her and May, Wen said, "not only did she lose her face, she lost her will, really. I mean she is completely controlled by Whitehall and...it's sort of a sad character for me to portray because she's so opposite from May. May is so confident and knows exactly what she needs to do and can get the job done based on her own opinions and with Agent 33, not only is she disfigured, not only doesn't she have her face anymore, she doesn't have her identity anymore." After Palamas breaks free of her brainwashing and joins Ward, Stojan said of the character and their new relationship, "That love/romance that she has with Ward...she's really, I think, trying to find herself—whether it's good or bad. She truly believes in that one man, and she's going to follow him."

==== Jiaying ====
Jiaying (portrayed by Dichen Lachman) is the Inhuman wife of Calvin Johnson, and Daisy and Kora's mother, who does not age and can heal herself rapidly via an elder of her village giving their life each year. Pieced back together by Calvin after Daniel Whitehall dissects her to discover the secret to her abilities, Jiaying is never the same, and goes to great lengths to find her daughter; even going as far as to willingly take innocent lives to feed her abilities. Eventually, Jiaying tries to escape this new persona by founding Afterlife, a haven for Inhumans, and when Daisy (going by Skye) journeys there, she happily becomes her mentor. However, when S.H.I.E.L.D. discovers Afterlife, Jiaying starts a war with them, and attempts to kill all humans with artificial Terrigen crystals. After Skye attacks her, she attempts to drain her life, but is stopped by Calvin, who kills her.

While in the year 1983, Melinda May and Elena Rodriguez visit Jiaying at Afterlife to help Elena regain her powers, which the Inhuman determines is mental based. After Nathaniel Malick attacks Afterlife and sways Kora to his side, May and Rodriguez convince Jiaying to escape and regroup. She later rejoins S.H.I.E.L.D. and encounters Daisy, only for Nathaniel to find them and kill Jiaying.

Speaking about the levels of violence depicted in the series, Bell admitted that the executive producers and the network did question the graphic nature of the sequence where Jiaying is dissected by Whitehall, but that it was ultimately kept as is because they felt that "it was important for you to understand how horrible that was and what she went through and miraculously survived—that was a big part of our story." For Jiaying's costume, Foley "wanted her to have an other-worldly kind of feeling and then also, at the time, Dichen [Lachman] was pregnant, so we needed to come up with a silhouette that could hide the pregnancy, and kind of grow with her which is why we landed on that tunic. The great thing about it is that it had this really cool Asian feeling to it with the high neck and the buttons down the front." Foley chose the fabrics for Jiaying's tunics based on what was going on in the story and how she felt the character was thinking.

In regards to Jiaying's perceived role as the main villain of the second season due to her actions in the final episodes, Bell said "In our minds, [Jiaying] wasn't a villain so much; she was an antagonist, but if you look at why she feels the way she does, Jiaying really earned that position." After the character's backstory and motivations were revealed, she was compared by some to the Marvel Comics character Magneto. In response to this, Bell said "We didn't consciously mimic [Magneto], but what they both have in common is a valid motive. Jiaying was ripped to shreds...I feel like her motive is really earned in the same way that Magneto's is fairly earned. We always want our antagonists to have good motives...We tried to make everything she says be true."

==== Gordon ====
Gordon (portrayed by Jamie Harris, Philip Labes as a young man in season two, Fin Argus as a young man in season seven) is an eyeless Inhuman with the ability to teleport and emit force fields he could use to transport others with him. His transition to an Inhuman was tended to by Jiaying, and he remained loyal to her in his adult life. With his position, he ensured that only a select few could enter and leave Afterlife and joined Jiaying in her war against S.H.I.E.L.D. While trying to spread Terrigen Mist through The Iliad's ventilation system, he is killed by Fitz.

While May and Yo-Yo were in 1983, they visited Afterlife to help the latter regain her powers; during which they encountered a young Gordon. After Nathaniel Malick attacked, Gordon helped Jiaying escape before eventually joining up with S.H.I.E.L.D. and helping Coulson get back to Afterlife. However, they are captured and Gordon has his powers forcibly transplanted to John Garrett. He later succumbs to his injuries when he uses the last of his power to rescue Coulson.

==== Andrew Garner / Lash ====
Andrew Garner (portrayed by Blair Underwood) is May's ex-husband and a psychologist at Culver University who assesses gifted people for S.H.I.E.L.D. Following a vacation with May to try and rekindle their relationship, Garner is exposed to Terrigen which unlocks Inhuman abilities within him; he becomes the monstrous Lash (portrayed by Matt Willig), who uses energy abilities to hunt and kill 'unworthy' Inhumans. Garner surrenders himself to S.H.I.E.L.D. before the transformation becomes permanent, and manages to say goodbye to May before completely becoming Lash. S.H.I.E.L.D. then send Lash to fight Hive, hoping that his Inhuman purpose is to destroy the latter. Though this is not the case, Lash is able to purge Daisy Johnson of Hive's control, before being killed by Hellfire.

In December 2014, Underwood was revealed to be cast as Garner for multiple appearances starting in the second season. In July 2015, the Inhuman Lash, who was created by Charles Soule and Joe Madureira for Inhuman #1, was announced as appearing in the third season. That August, Willig was revealed to be cast as Lash, with Hetrick again working alongside the series' makeup and visual effects teams to realize the character's "unique look" from the comics. Whedon noted that it would be their "own take on [Lash]. There will be some elements from the comics for sure, but as we always do...we're changing it up a little bit." Bell elaborated that "it's hard to have a hidden or magical city" in the MCU, such as Lash's comic home of Orollan, but "Lash's agenda can certainly remain true to what it was in the comics", with him judging whether Inhumans are worthy. Willig's Lash make-up initially took six hours to apply, but the make-up team was able to reduce the time to four and a half hours.

Whedon noted that the series already has several Inhumans who are "fairly attractive" and the producers wanted "to also show the other side of the change that bad things can happen", with Tancharoen elaborating that "on a very basic level, we were interested in putting a monster in the mix, because he is not human and his looks are pretty crazy and scary. We wanted to put our team up against something like that." On how the cast and characters react to seeing Lash, Bennet said, "I like to think that they've seen their fair share of crazy shit and that's just something that's pretty insane but not totally mind-blowing." Following the reveal that Lash still had a human form, Bell said that they would spend time exploring different characters as potential candidates, though the human form was revealed to be Garner two episodes later. For the onscreen CGI transformation from Garner to Lash, Underwood and Willig were 3D scanned (the latter while in full prosthetics and make-up), and then Underwood provided motion capture for the sequence. Visual effects supervisor Mark Kolpack noted the lack of resemblance between Underwood and the final Lash design, and so wanted to keep as much of Underwood's "essence" throughout the transformation process as possible. Underwood portrayed the transformation as "painful", "rigid", and "tiring", though he noted that it would become easier for the character to transform the more it happened.

Going into the third season, Underwood had only known that the producers wanted to explore more of Garner's personal life, after his appearances in the second season were "as an appendage to Agent May...a device and a construct to open her up and see more of her life." He also did not see the Lash reveal coming, which he did not learn until the table read for "Devils You Know", when it is presumed Garner is dead, and the producers approached him afterwards to tell them their plan for the character. Underwood compared the Garner / Lash dynamic to Jekyll and Hyde and Bruce Banner / the Hulk, and compared the new May / Garner dynamic to Beauty and the Beast. On Lash's motivations, Underwood stated that "Lash sees [the Inhumans] as an exalted society and it's an honor to be an Inhuman. Not everyone is worthy of that moniker. He takes it upon himself to be judge, jury and executioner of who is worthy of being an Inhuman and who is not." Elaborating on this and Garner's connection to Lash, Underwood said, "If you look at his work as a psychologist...in S.H.I.E.L.D., he determines [who] is worthy and is not worthy to be part of the Secret Warriors team...it makes sense that it's kind of that same kind of rationale, but on steroids".

==== Robert Gonzales ====
Robert Gonzales (portrayed by Edward James Olmos) is an elderly S.H.I.E.L.D. agent, tactician, and the commander of The Iliad during the fall of S.H.I.E.L.D. who is tasked with protecting the Kree monolith. He is convinced not to destroy the ship (to prevent Hydra from claiming the monolith) so that the hundreds of agents on board may live, disobeying Fury's orders, and subsequently becomes a founding member of the "real S.H.I.E.L.D." alongside Anne Weaver, Tomas Calderon, and Agent Oliver. He remains hyper-critical of secrets and all things alien, even after agreeing to keep Coulson on as Director of a new, unified S.H.I.E.L.D., but still attempts to negotiate with Jiaying and the Inhumans peacefully. However, Jiaying kills Gonzales and shoots herself, claiming that he attacked her to start a war against S.H.I.E.L.D.

It was announced in January 2015 that Olmos would be joining the series as Robert Gonzales, with Olmos describing joining the MCU one of the high points of his career. Concerning the apparent difference in philosophies between Gonzales and Coulson, Olmos explained that "the situations that I've come across and the situations that he's come across have changed our ability to work with the same understanding. He's working like Fury worked and under that understanding. I don't work under Fury's understanding....I think that Coulson's philosophy is the same as mine! We are S.H.I.E.L.D. We are not anything but S.H.I.E.L.D. people. It's just that our S.H.I.E.L.D., the one that we originally put forth, was very, very transparent. And the S.H.I.E.L.D. that has materialized under Fury—and now Coulson—is much more secretive." Olmos also compared the relationship between the two factions of S.H.I.E.L.D. to that between the Democrats and the Republicans.

==== Alisha Whitley ====
Alisha Whitley (portrayed by Alicia Vela-Bailey) is a duplicating Inhuman who was loyal to Jiaying until she learned that the latter started the war with S.H.I.E.L.D. After Jiaying's death, Alisha helps S.H.I.E.L.D. until she falls under the influence of Hive. She is later murdered by a Kree reaper offscreen.

==== Kebo ====
Kebo (portrayed by Daz Crawford) is a member of Hydra, second-in-command to Ward until he is killed by Morse. Crawford only signed on for the second-season finale, but the writers liked him in the character and so brought him back for the third season. Crawford said that Kebo has reservations about Ward as a boss, but "some people like their bosses, some people don't."

=== Introduced in season three ===
==== Rosalind Price ====
Rosalind Price (portrayed by Constance Zimmer) is the head of the ATCU as it crosses paths with S.H.I.E.L.D. in the hunt for Inhumans. After developing a romantic relationship with Coulson, Price is killed by Ward.

In July 2015, Zimmer was cast as Price, who Gregg described as "a potent...I wouldn't say doppelganger, but she's definitely got a lot in common with Coulson. She represents a character who's not someone he comes across every day, who has more in common with him than most other people do." That September, Bell elaborated, "Where in the past, Coulson frequently plays sort of a paternal role on the show, because Daisy is kind of a surrogate daughter figure—suddenly there's another adult [in Price], who can banter, who can hold her own, and there's something nice about seeing him in that relationship."

==== Luther Banks ====
Luther Banks (portrayed by Andrew Howard) is an ATCU agent and former Marine loyal to Price. He is killed by Giyera.

==== Joey Gutierrez ====
Joey Gutierrez (portrayed by Juan Pablo Raba) is an Inhuman and former construction worker with the ability to melt certain metals who is recruited by S.H.I.E.L.D. for Daisy Johnson's Secret Warriors team.

Raba was announced as cast in August 2015. Scott Meslow of Vulture and Oliver Sava of The A.V. Club, reviewing the season three episode "Laws of Nature", both indicated their pleasure in seeing Gutierrez, a gay character, appear on the series, which Meslow noted appeared to be the first openly gay character in the MCU.

==== Werner von Strucker ====
Werner von Strucker (portrayed by Spencer Treat Clark) is the son of Hydra leader Baron "Wolfgang" von Strucker, who is recruited to Hydra by Ward after Wolfgang's death. After failing to follow Ward's orders to kill Garner, Werner is left in a vegetative state by Kebo, and is taken into S.H.I.E.L.D. custody. He is later hospitalized in an asylum and teams up with General Hale and her daughter Ruby upon being freed. Werner gave in to General Hale's demands when he saw one of his father's experiments in the form of Carl Creel lifting weights. After Ruby gets 8% of the gravitonium in her, Werner is accidentally killed by Ruby.

==== Giyera ====
R. Giyera (portrayed by Mark Dacascos) is a telekinetic Inhuman and head of security for the ATCU, secretly loyal to Malick. He is eventually swayed over to Hive's side, until he is killed by Fitz.

==== Polly Hinton ====
Polly Hinton (portrayed by Lola Glaudini) is the wife of Charles Hinton and mother of Robin Hinton.

==== J. T. James / Hellfire ====
J. T. James (portrayed by Axle Whitehead) is an Inhuman who was refused the right of Terrigenesis by Jiaying and banished from Afterlife. Johnson subjects James to the transformation while under the influence of Hive, giving James the ability to imbue objects with fire. He is then taken under Hive's influence himself, and chooses the codename Hellfire. After Hive is destroyed, James suffers terrible withdrawal symptoms and comes to hate being an Inhuman as a result. He betrays his kind to the Watchdogs, helping them track and kill other Inhumans, with the promise that they would kill him when they are done.

Whitehead first guest starred as James in "Paradise Lost", introduced as someone from Lincoln's past, with Whitehead and Mitchell having previously starred together on Home and Away. With the character recurring through the rest of the third season, he was revealed to be an adaptation of the comic Secret Warrior character Hellfire. Executive producer Tancharoen felt it was "a no-brainer" to include Hellfire in the series, despite him not being Inhuman in the comics. Whedon expanded, saying, "We liked his attitude. He's a tell-it-like-it-is guy. He's a little bit of a prick. He does not care if he's liked, and that's fun to write." The producers were also able to find a way to incorporate Hellfire's signature fire chain into the series. In the fourth season, it is revealed that his full name is J. T. James.

==== Anderson ====
Anderson (portrayed by Alexander Wraith) is a S.H.I.E.L.D. agent and assistant to Coulson.

==== Nathaniel Malick ====
Nathaniel Malick (portrayed by Joel Dabney Courtney in season three, Thomas E. Sullivan in season seven) is Gideon's brother, whom he sacrificed to Hive. Hive later tapped into his memories and used them to get revenge on Gideon by killing Nathaniel's niece Stephanie.

While traveling through time to stop the Chronicoms, the S.H.I.E.L.D. team encountered Nathaniel in the 1970s, who lived long after his death in the original timeline after the Chronicoms aligned themselves with his father Wilfred. Following an encounter with Daisy and seeing her use her powers, Nathaniel became inspired to work independently of Hydra before capturing her and transplanting her abilities to himself. By the 1980s, he refined his control over them and aligned himself with the Chronicom Sibyl. Once they get ahold of her Time Stream, Nathaniel gleaned knowledge of the future from it and used it to recruit like-minded individuals to sow chaos, such as a young John Garrett and the Inhuman Kora, as well as attempt to eliminate Fitz as he holds the key to foiling his plans. After losing patience however, he inadvertently ruins Sibyl's plan to find Fitz before taking Kora's powers following her betrayal and fighting Daisy, during which she detonates the Chronicoms' ships; killing Nathaniel in the process.

==== Piper ====
Piper (portrayed by Briana Venskus) is a S.H.I.E.L.D. agent and member of May's strike team. She makes sporadic minor appearances helping the team in their various missions and forms a connection with Agent Davis.

==== Aida "Ophelia" / Madame Hydra ====
Aida (portrayed by Mallory Jansen) is a Life Model Decoy, an android body based on Radcliffe's former lover and partner Agnes Kitsworth (also portrayed by Jansen) into which he transferred his artificial intelligence AIDA (voiced by Amanda Rea). After the Darkhold shows Radcliffe the secret to eternal life, Radcliffe programs Aida to go rogue in an attempt to steal the book from S.H.I.E.L.D. She is ultimately beheaded in battle against S.H.I.E.L.D., and Radcliffe builds a new model of the android. Aida later kills Kitsworth, so her consciousness can reside in the Framework reality. Aida enters the Framework where she takes up the name "Ophelia" and is also known as Madame Hydra, the leader of Hydra. She also has a relationship with Leo Fitz in his alias of The Doctor. Agnes also resides in the Framework, living with Radcliffe's consciousness on Ogygia before she is deleted by The Doctor. With the help of Project Looking Glass, Aida succeeds in making her organic body, and once again goes by Ophelia. Ophelia also gains the Inhuman abilities of teleportation, electric charge manipulation, and a healing factor. She is later killed by Phil Coulson possessed by Ghost Rider.

The artificial intelligence AIDA is briefly voiced by Amanda Rea in the third-season finale. By June 2016, casting was underway for a "very attractive" actress to portray the robot in a recurring role for the fourth season. The character was described as moving around "quite naturally", but speaking "a bit formally" like Iron Man's J.A.R.V.I.S. A.I. in the MCU films. In August, Jansen was cast in the role; she also portrays Agnes Kitsworth, for which she uses her native Australian accent. In April 2017, it was revealed that Aida would appear in the Framework reality as Madame Hydra, also portrayed by Jansen. On having Aida become Madame Hydra, Whedon noted, "We had what is one of most formidable female villains we've ever had [in Aida], and we were bringing back Hydra, so it seemed like a natural pairing. She's plugged herself into this world and clearly she's trying to live some other new, unique life. We felt like if you grew up in a world and tried to be as powerful as you could be, and that world was Hydra-dominated, then it would be natural that she would become [Madame Hydra]. We thought it would be a fun way to introduce that character that's so creepy, odd, weird, and fun."

Aida's costume was custom made, and inspired by the works of Alexander McQueen. Foley wanted it to be simple to "not take away from the character at all", but also "sort of a 'Where did this outfit come from?' kind of a feeling so that it's specifically hers. It just adds to the mystery of who she is." Jansen described "Aida 2.0" as being programmed to be more ruthless, with the character's costume a darker shade of gray than that worn by the original Aida to reflect these changes. New costume designer Amanda Riley took Foley's costumes for Aida as the base shape of the Madame Hydra costume, but looked to make it feel "stronger" and more military-esque than those costumes by having the shoulders of the costume evoke epaulettes. The costume uses the color green, which is closely tied with the character in the comics.

=== Introduced in season four ===
==== Robbie Reyes / Ghost Rider ====
Roberto "Robbie" Reyes (portrayed by Gabriel Luna) is a mechanic who, alongside his brother Gabe, was attacked by gang members who were hired to kill their uncle Eli Morrow. Gabe was paralyzed and Robbie was killed, but his life was saved when a Ghost Rider riding a motorcycle gave Robbie his power, creating a new Ghost Rider. Robbie lives to protect Gabe, and at night he seeks out vengeance by hunting the guilty and murdering them. His actions bring him into contact with the vigilante Quake and the agents of S.H.I.E.L.D., through whom he learns of his uncle's interests in the Darkhold. This leads to Robbie taking Morrow through a portal to another dimension. After returning to Earth, Robbie Reyes helps to defeat Aida and uses his new portal-making abilities to take the Darkhold far away.

Advertisements for Agents of S.H.I.E.L.D. ahead of the 2016 San Diego Comic-Con featuring a flaming chain lead to speculation that the character of Ghost Rider would be joining the series during the season, though it was noted that the image could indicate an increased role for Hellfire after his introduction in the third season. When casting for a Latino character matching the description of Marvel Comics' Robbie Reyes, was revealed to be underway for the series, further speculation pointed to the inclusion of Ghost Rider, a mantle that Reyes took over in the comics. At the series' Comic-Con panel, this speculation was confirmed, and Luna was announced to be cast in the role. Luna had initially been hesitant to sign up for a recurring, rather than starring, role, but changed his mind once he was told that the character would be Ghost Rider, who he was a fan of growing up. He felt it was "too good to be true" that Reyes "was a character who looked like me, acted like me, and had this amazing family dynamic with his brother", with Luna relating to the latter since his father died before he was born leaving Luna the "oldest male in [his] immediate family".

Luna described the Ghost Rider as a "separate entity" from Reyes, comparing the dynamic to the Hulk. Reyes was chosen as the Ghost Rider for the series, over other versions of the character, since his is the newest version from the comics, and the executive producers thought "it would be interesting to bring in someone with [his] background into our dynamic". Regarding if the character would be possessed by a Satanic serial killer, as in the comics, or by the more traditional Spirit of Vengeance, Tancharoen said, "We're staying true to his circumstance. But as always with any property that we use, we're taking our liberties with it," with Whedon adding that they would be "pulling a little bit from different versions of the Ghost Rider" with "a little mixing and matching". Luna said that due to the character's recent introduction in the comics, "a lot of the show is going to be expanding the Ghost Rider canon"; however Luna read all 12 issues of the All-New Ghost Rider series that introduced Reyes for preparation. The character drives a 1969 Dodge Charger in the show, the "Hellcharger" of the comics which Luna nicknamed Lucy, for Lucifer. The production had a hero car and a double for stunts, while the visual effects team used a CG double when needed. Eric Norris serves as Luna's stunt driver, with Morgan Benoit, a frequent collaborator with Luna, as his stunt double.

The character's signature jacket and flaming head were designed by Marvel Television creative director Joshua Shaw, based on Felipe Smith's design from the comics. The skull design includes exhaust-type jets of flames coming from the temples to mimic the effects on his car. For the CG skull, Luna wore tracking markers on his face to provide performance-reference for these sequences, especially for the animation of Ghost Rider's coal-like eyes. Luna also wears a hood fitted with flickering lights, to create the effect of fire lighting up his costume and surfaces around him. The lights can be adjusted to match different temperature fire for different situations. Whedon noted that the series depicts Reyes' flaming head "exactly as much as we can afford", adding, "We're hoping that the character has not just a flaming skull but some real heart to him, and some depth." Foley paired the character's jacket with jeans and Vans to keep Reyes "grounded in the reality of where he was brought up in Los Angeles". Foley also worked with Kolpack to ensure that the costume would not interfere with the visual effects. Since a skeleton does not have a voice box, the Ghost Rider does not speak in the series.

In August 2016, Marvel Television head Jeph Loeb said that the character "could venture into other sections of the Marvel Cinematic Universe", depending on the audience's response to their take on him, saying, "if we can tell that story in a compelling way, then the thing to do is to then have people want more. And if they want more, the networks say, oh, we want more." On this, Luna noted that he "signed on the line to do all the work necessary ... that's extremely exciting." That October, Luna said that there had been "rumblings" about a spin-off for the character, but reiterated that it would depend on audience response.

==== Gabe Reyes ====
Gabriel "Gabe" Reyes (portrayed by Lorenzo James Henrie) is Robbie's younger brother, who was paralyzed in the accident that led to Robbie becoming the Ghost Rider.

Casting for a Latino character matching the description of Gabe Reyes, was revealed to be underway for the series at the same time as it was for Robbie. Robbie Reyes was confirmed for the series in September 2016, and Henrie was revealed to be portraying Gabe later that month. The role was one of the first that Henrie auditioned for after he finished filming for Fear the Walking Dead, in which his character is killed off. At his audition, Henrie confirmed that he would be able to dedicate his time to Agents of S.H.I.E.L.D. without spoiling the events of Fear for the S.H.I.E.L.D. casting team, and was cast in the role the next day. His introduction as Gabe aired only weeks after his Fear the Walking Dead death aired.

==== Lucy Bauer ====
Lucy Bauer (portrayed by Lilli Birdsell) was a scientist working at Momentum Labs in a group including her husband Joseph and engineer Eli Morrow. They were experimenting with the mysterious Darkhold until Morrow took steps to gain the book's power for himself by creating a machine that turned Lucy and her co-workers into ghost-like beings. Lucy later attempts to force Morrow to restore her body, but his nephew Robbie Reyes exorcised her first with the power of the Ghost Rider, destroying her.

==== Jeffrey Mace / Patriot ====
Jeffrey Mace (portrayed by Jason O'Mara) is the new Director of S.H.I.E.L.D., who was appointed to try and restore the trust of the public following the public outlawing of Steve Rogers and several of the Avengers due to the Sokovia Accords. Originally thought by the public and other members of S.H.I.E.L.D. to be an Inhuman with super-strength and invulnerability, Mace instead received his abilities from the U.S. government's Project Patriot, which used a super-serum derived from Calvin Johnson's formula. Mace received the serum after being heralded for a heroic moment at a ceremony in Vienna, Austria following the signing of the Sokovia Accords. With S.H.I.E.L.D. in need of a new, enhanced director on the recommendation of outgoing director Coulson, Talbot and the U.S. government gave the job to Mace, who they could trust. After it was revealed that Mace's powers were a lie, Coulson decided that Mace should stay on as "the Patriot" and the face and political leader of S.H.I.E.L.D., while Coulson takes back command of S.H.I.E.L.D. operations. In the Framework, Mace is the head of the S.H.I.E.L.D. resistance. During the raid on the Hydra Cultivation Enlightenment Camp, Mace sacrifices himself to buy everyone time to get out of the collapsing quarantine building, resulting in his death in the real world as well.

A flash-forward at the end of the third-season finale revealed that Coulson would no longer be the director of S.H.I.E.L.D. in the fourth season. The showrunners intentionally avoided giving hints as to who the new director would be in the sequence. After speculation in the media about which previously introduced character could be taking on the role, it was revealed that the new leader would actually be a new character to the series portrayed by O'Mara, described as a character "whose Marvel roots go back to the 1940s". The character was always going to be new to the series, as the executive producers felt that replacing Coulson with someone he knows "wouldn't [provide] as much tension to mine from". The character was revealed to be Mace and an Inhuman with super strength with his introduction in "Meet the New Boss". O'Mara, a big Marvel fan as a child who has worked a lot with ABC, found out that Marvel was "really seriously" interested in him for the part in the same call that his agent told him that his A&E pilot The Infamous was not getting picked up to series. Within 24 hours, O'Mara had talked to Loeb, watched some of the third season of Agents of S.H.I.E.L.D., and accepted an offer to join the season without reading a script for it. He described the character as "high status", saying that "he comes in and he's the boss, telling the other characters orders. Here I come in after [the other actors] been doing this for four years and I'm telling them what to do. It's a little awkward".

==== Ellen Nadeer ====
Ellen Nadeer (portrayed by Parminder Nagra) is a senator and leader of the Humans First movement, who hates Inhumans after her mother's death during the Chitauri invasion. Her hatred of Inhumans comes from misunderstanding their origins believing them to be aliens who have taken over the bodies of people. She fears that an invasion will happen, when all Inhumans are just a new minority on Earth. Ellen even attempts to kill her brother Vijay, who resisted Terrigenesis for seven months before being freed. This results in him cocooning a second time. Nadeer allies herself with the Watchdogs as their benefactor. When high-ranking Watchdog Tucker Shockley tests Nadeer's humanity with a Terrigen crystal, it reveals his own explosive Inhuman abilities. Nadeer and those with her die in the ensuing explosion.

==== Burrows ====
Burrows (portrayed by Patrick Cavanaugh) is a member of S.H.I.E.L.D.'s PR division loyal to Mace. He dies during the ambush on the airplane that Coulson and Mace are on. In the Framework, Burrows is part of the S.H.I.E.L.D. resistance.

==== Eli Morrow ====
Elias "Eli" Morrow (portrayed by José Zúñiga) is the uncle of Robbie and Gabe Reyes, and engineer who helped raise his nephews. After his coworkers at Momentum Energy labs began experimenting with the Darkhold, Morrow came to crave its power for himself. He put Joseph Bauer into a coma trying to find the book, and ultimately turned the rest of his coworkers into ghost-like beings. S.H.I.E.L.D. breaks him out of prison believing him to be a victim, but he uses the Darkhold to create a machine that gives him the power to create matter. Ghost Rider drags Eli and himself into another dimension.

The comics version of Eli Morrow is a Satanist who, after dying, possesses his nephew Robbie and turns him into the Ghost Rider. In August 2016, Whedon cautioned that the series would not necessarily be directly adapting the comics' storyline, saying, "We can't say much about what we're going to do with [Robbie Reyes'] origin, but we are doing our own spin on it. We don't want people who have read the comics to know exactly what's coming." In October, Morrow was confirmed to be appearing in the series, with Zúñiga cast. He is changed for the series by introducing him as an apparently innocent man, and then revealing him to be as power hungry as his fellow scientists experimenting on the Darkhold. The abilities he gains from his experiments have been compared to those of the comic character Molecule Man.

==== Anton Ivanov / The Superior ====
Anton Ivanov (portrayed by Zach McGowan) is a reclusive Russian industrialist known as "The Superior", who champions traditional values and old-fashioned hardware over modern technology and extraterrestrial entities. He believes that Coulson is the cause of Earth's alien problems (due to pictures of him investigating unknown objects) and works with the Watchdogs, Senator Nadeer, and Holden Radcliffe to fight S.H.I.E.L.D. He is highly deluded, believing Inhumans are cheaters and monsters. After being crippled by Daisy Johnson, Aida decapitates Ivanov and creates an android body for his mind to control. Ivanov then creates multiple additional bodies for his mind to control. After finding Anton Ivanov's head, General Hale persuaded Ivanov to join up with her. His head was on a robot body when he confronts Yo-Yo so he could use the Particle Infusion Chamber. Ivanov was knocked out a window by Yo-Yo which finally killed him and deactivated his mechanical soldiers.

==== Hope Mackenzie ====
Hope Mackenzie (portrayed by Jordan Rivera) is Mack's daughter. She died shortly after birth in real life, but she appears alive in the Framework. Hope's Framework counterpart is later deleted when the Framework collapses.

==== Enoch ====
Enoch Coltrane (portrayed by Joel Stoffer) is a Chronicom anthropologist from the planet Chronyca-2 who poses as a human. He abducts and sends Phil Coulson's group, except for Fitz, through time to the Lighthouse in the year 2091 due to a prophecy uncovered by Robin Hinton. He later helps Fitz get to the same time to save the rest of his team. During the final battle with Kasius, Enoch and Deke sacrifice themselves to get Coulson's team back to their own time.

In season six, his present day form later works to keep Fitz' body safe when their ship is attacked by the Confederacy. When they arrive on the planet Kitson, Enoch and Fitz work to afford a way off. After Fitz is captured by Chronicom Hunter Malachi, Enoch runs into Simmons. When Enoch's superior, Atarah orders him to use Fitz and Simmons to figure out time travel to save Chronyca-2, he betrays her and helps his new friends escape. Once he is sure they will be safe, Enoch leaves to make contact with fellow Chronicom anthropologist Isaiah, only to learn he had been reassigned. Despite this, Enoch takes over his body and returns to Earth to save Fitz and Simmons when Malachi raids the Lighthouse. To help S.H.I.E.L.D. combat the Chronicoms, he contributes technology from his planet towards the construction of a Phil Coulson L.M.D.

In season seven, Enoch helped S.H.I.E.L.D. time travel to the 1930s to stop the Chronicoms from killing Freddy Malick, father of future Hydra leader Gideon Malick. Though he was unable to reach his friends before they were forced to travel to a different time, Enoch remained with Ernest Koenig; becoming his new bartender in exchange for information on how he will come to help S.H.I.E.L.D. in the future. By 1955, Enoch retained his bartender position while continuing to help the S.H.I.E.L.D. team stop the Chronicoms' latest plot. In 1973, Enoch reunited with the S.H.I.E.L.D. agents while helping them escape a Hydra ambush. When the Zephyr is caught in a time storm, Enoch sacrifices his Electrochron Displacement Mechanism so Deke can fix the Time Drive. Before shutting down, he tells Daisy and the Coulson L.M.D. that this will be the team's final mission.

Stoffer originally appeared in the final episode of season four, when he was simply credited as "silhouetted man". When returning for the first episode of season five, Stoffer learned the character was an alien and learned the episode's opening montage, which included one of Stoffer's "favorite, all-time songs", would be of Enoch. As well, the character was initially called Silas before being changed to Enoch "because it just sounds better". Stoffer called playing Enoch "the opportunity of a life time" because he was able to invent who Enoch was as well as the Chronicom species. Michael Ahr from Den of Geek felt Stoffer's performance as Enoch would "go down in sci-fi history as one of the best android portrayals since Data of Star Trek: The Next Generation".

=== Introduced in season five ===
==== Tess ====
Tess (portrayed by Eve Harlow) is a resourceful, self-sufficient inhabitant of the Lighthouse with a hope for a better future. She was later hanged by the Kree with a message pinned to her demanding that Flint be brought to the Kree. Kasius later had the Kree doctor perform the Kree procedure to revive Tess so that she can carry a message for Mack and Yo-Yo to surrender Flint. Following the death of Kasius, Tess and Flint prepare to use Flint's abilities in an attempt to rebuild Earth.

Harlow was announced in the role in November 2017.

==== Kasius ====
Kasius (portrayed by Dominic Rains) is a Kree nobleman and perfectionist in the year 2091 who is the overseer of the Lighthouse. Kasius was sent to oversee the Lighthouse by his father after his failure in an earlier battle while his brother Faulnak oversaw the Kree Empire. During his fight with Mack, Kasius took a Kree medicine that removes his pain after killing future Elena. With help from Jemma, Mack was able to kill Kasius.

Rains' makeup takes 4 hours to apply.

==== Sinara ====
Sinara (portrayed by Florence Faivre) is a female Kree in the year 2091 who serves as Kasius' second-in-command, enforcer, and head of the Kree Watch. She wields floating spheres which she uses to either attack her enemies or kill anyone who has offended Kasius. After most of Phil Coulson's group fled to the remains of Earth, Kasius sent Sinara to dispose of them. During the gravity storm fight with Daisy Johnson aboard the modified Zephyr-One, Sinara was killed when Daisy Johnson impaled her with a pipe.

Faivre's makeup takes 3.5 hours to apply.

==== Grill ====
Grill (portrayed by Pruitt Taylor Vince) is a "gruff taskmaster" of the Lighthouse's junkyard with an unforgiving temperament, who does not have illusions about the world he lives in. When Grill finds out about Yo-Yo, Flint's Inhuman ability manifests where he kills Grill with assembled rocks in self-defense.

Vince was announced in the role in November 2017.

==== Flint ====
Flint (portrayed by Coy Stewart) is a young man and inhabitant of the Lighthouse looking to make something of himself, and to prove that he is capable of big things. He undergoes Terrigenesis and develops geokinesis, which he first used to kill Grill in self-defense. Flint later helps Mack and Yo-Yo defeat attacking Vrellnexians. Before dying, an elderly Robin Hinton tells Melinda May about a vision that involves Flint which she had when she was still a child. After rebuilding the Time Monolith, Flint joins Tess to rebuild Earth.

In season 6, Izel uses the Di'Allas' energies to create a clone of Flint from Mack and Yo-Yo's memories to help her rebuild the Monoliths. After possessing Flint to do so, Izel possessed Yo-Yo and broke Flint's leg before Piper helps evacuate him.

In season 7, Flint and Piper help protect Enoch, Leo Fitz, Jemma Simmons, and their daughter Alya while they defeat the Chronicoms. One year later, Flint becomes a student of Coulson Academy under May.

Stewart was announced in the role in November 2017. The role is based on a character of the same name from the Inhumans comics.

==== Hale ====
Hale (portrayed by Catherine Dent) is a brigadier general and the mother of Ruby who hunts Phil Coulson's group after what happened to Glenn Talbot. Alyssa Jirrels portrays a teenage Hale. During her teenage life, she is a rival of Baron Strucker and a classmate of Jasper Sitwell. Daniel Whitehall selected her to bring up Hydra's next leader through insemination. Later on, she came across an alien device that enabled her to contact Qovas of an alien alliance called the Confederacy. It's her weariness of the Confederacy that led to General Hale's attempts to get S.H.I.E.L.D. and Hydra to work together. She soon teams up with Carl Creel and Anton Ivanov. Following Ruby's death, Hale informs Qovas that S.H.I.E.L.D. now has the gravitonium. After Talbot absorbs the gravitonium and takes command of Qovas' ship, Hale tries to control him through his Hydra reprogramming, but he rebels and crushes Hale with his powers.

==== Ruby Hale ====
Ruby Hale (portrayed by Dove Cameron) is the daughter of General Hale who has an obsession with Daisy Johnson. She has been trained as an assassin by her mother and wields chakrams which she used to slice half of Elena's arms off when she was attacking Mack. It was revealed that she was born through insemination. When Ruby gets 8% of the gravitonium in her, she starts to hear Franklin Hall and Ian Quinn's voices in her head like Carl Creel which leads to her accidentally killing Werner von Strucker. After attempts by Daisy Johnson and General Hale to get her to let them help, Elena had no choice but to use one of Ruby's chakrams to euthanize her, and takes her revenge against Ruby for having sliced her arms.

In November 2017, Marvel revealed that Cameron had joined the season in an unspecified role, which was revealed in January 2018 to be the character Ruby. Cameron described Ruby as "a very interesting, complex, dark girl", "a wild card", and noted she believe her to be asexual. When auditioning for the role, Cameron, who did not know anything about Ruby or the character, played her like a murderer, which the producers liked. This helped Cameron once she was cast in the role and learned that Ruby was some form of assassin. Regarding Ruby's relationship with her mother, Cameron felt the relationship was "complex" with both of these strong women. She continued, "there's also a lot of love there. It's like a real, complicated mother-daughter relationship. It's very sad. It's very gratifying. It's very scary. It's very fast. It's very physical."

==== Qovas ====
Qovas (portrayed by Peter Mensah) is a Remorath representative of the Confederacy that General Hale answers to. Qovas pursues the gravitonium S.H.I.E.L.D. has in their possession, by sending Remorath warriors down to the Lighthouse. This ends with the Remorath warriors being killed by a gravitonium-enhanced Glenn Talbot. During his fight with May where he is defeated, Qovas launches ionizing missiles intended to strike the Lighthouse, only to find out that Deke changed the coordinates to strike his ship, killing him.

=== Introduced in season six ===
==== Marcus Benson ====
Marcus Benson (portrayed by Barry Shabaka Henley) is a Natural Science professor and colleague of Andrew Garner whom May recruited to offer his scientific expertise to S.H.I.E.L.D. He later gained an airplane to head to Central America where he found information about Izel. Izel summons him to the Zephyr while possessing Mack for the location of a temple she needs. She torments him with an apparition of Benson's deceased husband Thomas, who claims Benson was drunk when he ordered Thomas off life-support following a car accident. Benson gives up the location. Mack and Yo-Yo are able to send him to safety by ejecting him from the plane's containment unit to notify S.H.I.E.L.D. of Izel's location.

==== Jaco ====
Jaco (portrayed by Winston James Francis) is a smart and strong unspecified alien mercenary who is a member of Sarge's group. He was the runt of the litter of his family and wanted to be a baker until his family was "turned into fertilizer." When it came to the fight at Deke Shaw's tech company, Jaco was subdued by Deke and Mack using the Framework simulation. After pretending to have died from being unable to breathe Earth's atmosphere, Jaco revealed his fire-breathing abilities before Daisy knocked him out. After helping to rescue FitzSimmons from Izel's ship, Jaco sacrifices his life to blow up the Lazy Comet with Sarge's nuke.

==== Snowflake ====
Snowflake (portrayed by Brooke Williams) is a spacey yet lethal woman who is a member of Sarge's group and has a fascination with death and resurrection. She later falls in love with Deke after being abandoned by Sarge, who put his revenge over her safety. Following Sarge's detainment after his attempted hijacking of Zephyr One, Daisy had Snowflake detained for the murders she committed, much to Deke's dismay; though he did have a big screen TV placed in her cell.

==== Pax ====
Pax (portrayed by Matt O'Leary) is a dangerous yet humorous mercenary who is a member of Sarge's group. When it came to the fight at Deke Shaw's tech company, Pax was hit with an Icer. During a mission to take on Izel aboard her ship following the hijacking of Zephyr One, Pax is pushed face first into a Shelter Charge (a force field generating device Sarge brought) by Yo-Yo. While Jaco wanted to get him medical attention, Sarge chose to shoot him, believing he was slowing him down in his pursuit for revenge.

==== Malachi ====
Malachi (portrayed by Christopher James Baker) is a Chronicom hunter from Chronyca-2 who targets Fitz and answers to Atarah. He wields special chakrams that enable him to teleport. During a fight between the Chronicom hunters and Quake on Kitson, Malachi makes off with Fitz after he briefly reunited with Simmons. When Atarah starts to get impatient with FitzSimmons not being able to solve time travel, Malachi, Atarah, and the Chronicoms with them are disabled by Enoch, who takes Malachi's chakrams to teleport himself, Fitz, and Simmons away. Malachi later turns down Baal-Gad's offer to hunt down Fitz and Simmons; revealing that they have a copy of their brains in the Cerebral Fusion Machine. After acquiring the information he needed, Malachi recommends to Atarah that they establish a Chronyca-3, but she's adamant that Chronyca-2 can be still be saved. Malachi responds by shooting her and ordering his fellow Chronicoms to hunt down two targets. This leads him to reassigning all Chronicom anthropologists to hunters and lead a siege on the Lighthouse. Though Enoch managed to save Fitz, Simmons, and those with them, Malachi was able to take the Lighthouse and Fury's Toolbox.

==== Izel ====
Izel (portrayed by Karolina Wydra) is a mysterious, red-haired, non-corporeal alien mercenary who buys Fitz, Simmons, and Enoch from Mr. Kitson so they could help her on a mission to Earth to find her Di'Allas (the monoliths the S.H.I.E.L.D. team encountered in the past). She is later revealed to be the creator of the Shrikes and has been targeted by Sarge ever since she eliminated his family. After the destruction of her ship, Izel starts possessing S.H.I.E.L.D. agents to access Mack; resulting in Sarge getting shot and Davis' death. After recovering and healing, Sarge broke free and confronts Izel where the Gravitonium generator holding the Di'Allas' energies is. Sarge was left confused when Izel claims that he is from a non-corporeal world like her and that the "family" is Coulson's memories of his team. When she emerges from the room, Yo-Yo throws herself in front of Daisy to keep her from being possessed. Mack agrees to go along with Izel to keep her from causing more S.H.I.E.L.D. casualties and to protect Yo-Yo. Upon getting information about a specific temple from Benson, Izel keeps Mack and Yo-Yo around to help her rebuild the three Di'Allas; using their energies to manifest a clone of Flint from their memories. She possesses him and recreates the Di'Allas. Afterwards, she possesses Yo-Yo to break Flint's leg. When Izel was confronted by Sarge, he was unable to kill her, stabbed May, and sent her to the other side of the portal as a sign. Due to the nature of Izel's world, May was able to prevent the ritual from that end, causing Izel to fight May. After briefly making it back to Earth, Izel finds Sarge fighting Mack and Daisy. Once May appeared and impaled Izel with the sword, the remaining Shrike melted into goo freeing those who were possessed.

Izel is based on the Mayan goddess Ixchel from the comics and Mayan mythology.

=== Introduced in season seven ===
==== Wilfred "Freddy" Malick ====
Wilfred "Freddy" Malick (portrayed by Darren Barnet in 1931, Neal Bledsoe in 1955 and 1970s) is the doorman of a speakeasy underneath a post office in 1931. He was targeted by the Chronicom Hunters since he is the father of future Hydra leader, Gideon Malick. Despite interference from the Chronicoms and his boss Ernest trying to talk him out of it, Freddy met up with a Hydra representative and gave them a component for the super soldier serum that Abraham Erskine will make.

By 1955, Freddy has risen to power within Hydra and ostensibly S.H.I.E.L.D. After his men capture Deke instead of a S.H.I.E.L.D. scientist, Freddy chooses to spare him as Deke spared his life in 1931. He also puts out a hit on Daniel Sousa, though Deke's team is able to fake his death to help him survive. Following this, the Chronicoms form an alliance with Freddy, and help him live past 1970; the year he died in the original timeline. Using his position in S.H.I.E.L.D. and the Chronicoms' future knowledge, he attempts to establish Project Insight decades early, though Deke kills him before he can see the plan through.

==== Luke ====
Luke (portrayed by Luke Baines) is a Chronicom hunter working to stop S.H.I.E.L.D.'s creation. In 1931, he took on the identity of a New York police captain (portrayed by Tobias Jelinek) to kill Freddy Malick, but S.H.I.E.L.D. saved the latter, forcing the Chronicom to flee through a closing Time Window. Following another failed plot in 1955, he attempts to sway the Phil Coulson L.M.D. to the Chronicoms' side, but to no avail. In response, he stays behind to form an alliance with Freddy Malick. In 1976, he rejoins the Chronicoms to see Project Insight through and replace S.H.I.E.L.D. agents with more of their kind, only to be killed by General Rick Stoner.

==== Sibyl ====
Sibyl (portrayed by Tamara Taylor) is a Chronicom predictor capable of determining future probabilities using a device called a Time Stream. Following an encounter with the Coulson L.M.D., who destroyed her Chronicom Hunters' ship in 1976, she was trapped in the River's End power grid without a body until 1983, when she convinced a programmer to build a crude body for her before killing him once he served his purpose. Building crude, new Hunters, she used them to distract Coulson's team while she regained her Time Stream and join forces with Nathaniel Malick. After Kora took out the Lighthouse's power, she was able invade S.H.I.E.L.D.'s systems and download information on their bases' locations so her fellow Chronicoms could destroy them. She rejoined her fellow Chronicoms and regained her body to locate Leo Fitz, as he held the key to defeating them. However, an impatient Nathaniel ruined her plans and the S.H.I.E.L.D. agents brought her forces to their timeline before turning them against her and destroying her ships; taking her with them.

==== Kora ====
Kora (portrayed by Dianne Doan) is an Inhuman with energy-manipulating abilities, Jiaying's daughter, and Daisy's half-sister. She was raised by Jiaying in Afterlife, but feared the damage she might cause with her powers. While she killed herself in the original timeline, Nathaniel Malick saved her using the Chronicoms' future knowledge and convinced her to join his ranks. Taking part in his raid on Afterlife, Kora began to believe her mother held her back and gained finer control over her powers. When S.H.I.E.L.D. infiltrated Afterlife to rescue the Inhuman captives, they captured Kora, who claimed she wanted to join them. However, she helps Sibyl download information from S.H.I.E.L.D.'s computers before being taken back to Nathaniel. Having learned of Jiaying's death while she was in S.H.I.E.L.D.'s custody, Kora confronted Nathaniel, but he manipulates her into fighting Daisy instead. She tells her half-sister the truth, causing her to hesitate and forcing Nathaniel to betray Kora and transplant her powers to himself. However, Mack rescued her so she could help S.H.I.E.L.D. defeat Nathaniel and the Chronicoms. Following this, Kora joined the organization, working alongside Daisy and Daniel Sousa.

== Guest characters ==
The following is a supplementary list of guest stars that appear in lesser roles, make significant cameo appearances or who receive co-starring credit over multiple appearances. The characters are listed by the MCU media or season in which they first appeared.

=== Introduced in films ===
- Maria Hill (portrayed by Cobie Smulders, first in season one): Former S.H.I.E.L.D. Deputy Director
- Nick Fury (portrayed by Samuel L. Jackson, first in season one): Former S.H.I.E.L.D. Director
- Jasper Sitwell (portrayed by Maximiliano Hernández, Adam Faison as a teenager, first in season one): A Hydra operative within S.H.I.E.L.D. who trained alongside Hale and Strucker.
- Sif (portrayed by Jaimie Alexander, first in season one): An Asgardian warrior.
- Peggy Carter (portrayed by Hayley Atwell, first in season two): A co-founder of S.H.I.E.L.D.
- Timothy "Dum Dum" Dugan (portrayed by Neal McDonough, first in season two): A Howling Commando.
- Jim Morita (portrayed by Kenneth Choi, first in season two): A Howling Commando.
- List (portrayed by Henry Goodman, first in season two): A Hydra scientist interested in Inhumans.
- Matthew Ellis (portrayed by William Sadler, first in season three): President of the United States.
- Wolfgang von Strucker (portrayed by Joey Defore, first in season five): A leader of Hydra who specializes in human experimentation, advanced robotics, and artificial intelligence. Thomas Kretschmann portrayed an adult version of the character in the MCU films.

=== Introduced in short films ===
- Felix Blake (portrayed by Titus Welliver, first in season one): A S.H.I.E.L.D. agent whose spine is broken by Deathlok. He becomes the leader of the anti-Inhumans Watchdogs terrorist group and is now using a wheelchair.

=== Introduced in season one ===
- Streiten (portrayed by Ron Glass): A S.H.I.E.L.D. physician who oversaw Coulson's resurrection.
- Ace Peterson (portrayed by Ajani Wrighster): Mike Peterson's son.
- Debbie (portrayed by Shannon Lucio): A scientist at Project Centipede who worked on Mike Peterson. She later worked on Scorch and is later incinerated by him after being abandoned by Raina.
- Camilla Reyes (portrayed by Leonor Varela): A Peruvian military member and old colleague of Phil Coulson who was after the 0-8-4 for her government.
- Franklin Hall (portrayed by Ian Hart): A S.H.I.E.L.D. teacher who experimented with the gravitonium that his former partner Ian Quinn obtained. He later got trapped in the gravitonium. Hart was originally intended to make a recurring appearance in the series, but ended up appearing in only one episode after the writers chose to go in a different direction with their plans for the character.
- Edison Po (portrayed by Cullen Douglas): A Project Centipede leader. He was later killed by the Clairvoyant for failing him.
- Chan Ho Yin / Scorch (portrayed by Louis Ozawa Changchien): A street performer with pyrokinesis who joins up with Raina and Project Centipede to enhance his powers while they secretly siphoned his blood platelets to improve their Centipede Formula. He is killed by Melinda May.
- Elliot Randolph (portrayed by Peter MacNicol): An Asgardian stonemason and former berserker posing as a human college professor.
- Jakob Nystrom (portrayed by Michael Graziadei): The co-leader of the Norse Paganist Hate Group that was after the pieces of the Berserker Staff.
- Petra Larsen (portrayed by Erin Way): The girlfriend of Jakob Nystrom and co-leader of the Norse Paganist Hate Group that was after the pieces of the Berserker Staff.
- Thomas Ward (portrayed by Tyler Ritter as an adult, Micah Nelson as a boy): The abused brother of Grant and Christian, living in hiding from his family under an alias.
- Christian Ward (portrayed by Tim DeKay as an adult, Alex Neustaedter as a boy): A Massachusetts Senator and abusive brother to Grant and Thomas. Grant later kills Christian off-screen.
- Goodman (portrayed by Imelda Corcoran): A S.H.I.E.L.D. physician in Project T.A.H.I.T.I.
- T. Vanchat (portrayed by Aiden Turner): A black market dealer who sells alien technology. While Grant Ward had previously stolen a Chitauri Neural Link from his flat in Paris, Vanchat was later apprehended by S.H.I.E.L.D. to get the information on where Raina took Phil Coulson.
- Lloyd Rathman (portrayed by Rob Huebel): The director of wealth management for Kester, Dyer and Rathman LLP whose computer Skye under the alias of Melinda May had to get the transaction from after his offshore account was traced from one of Vanchat's transactions.
- Donnie Gill (portrayed by Dylan Minnette): A cadet at the S.H.I.E.L.D. Academy of Science and Technology who gains cryokinetic abilities following an experiment with a weather machine.
- Callie Hannigan (portrayed by Maiara Walsh): A cadet at the S.H.I.E.L.D. Academy of Science and Technology.
- Richard Lumley (portrayed by Boyd Kestner): A S.H.I.E.L.D. agent from Skye's past.
- Lorelei (portrayed by Elena Satine): An Asgardian with the ability to seduce any man. She escaped during Malekith the Accursed's attack on Asgard.
- Thomas Nash (portrayed by Brad Dourif): A vegetative man Garrett uses as a decoy Clairvoyant. Killed by Grant Ward.
- Marcus Daniels (portrayed by Patrick Brennan): A scientist able to drain the energy from anything following an experiment with the Darkforce. He explodes after being exposed to pure light powered by gamma radiation by S.H.I.E.L.D.
- Audrey Nathan (portrayed by Amy Acker): A cellist involved with Coulson before The Avengers and is the obsession of Marcus Daniels.
- Lian May (portrayed by Tsai Chin): Melinda May's mother.

Stan Lee makes a cameo appearance as a train patron. Chris Hemsworth appears as Thor via archive footage from Thor: The Dark World.

=== Introduced in season two ===
- Isabelle Hartley (portrayed by Lucy Lawless): A veteran S.H.I.E.L.D. agent. She is killed by Carl Creel.
- Carla Talbot (portrayed by Raquel Gardner): The wife of Glenn Talbot.
- George Talbot (portrayed by Jack Fisher): The son of Glenn and Carla Talbot.
- Kenneth Turgeon (portrayed by Adam Kulbersh): A scientist at Hydra Laboratories with Simmons.
- Marcus Scarlotti (portrayed by Falk Hentschel): A Hydra-aligned mercenary who poses as a S.H.I.E.L.D. agent to discredit S.H.I.E.L.D.
- Sebastian Derik (portrayed by Brian Van Holt): A S.H.I.E.L.D. assassin resurrected by T.A.H.I.T.I.
- Vin-Tak (portrayed by Eddie McClintock): A Kree intending to destroy the Diviners and Inhumans.
- Slicing Talons: A group of supervillains listed on S.H.I.E.L.D.'s Index who are brought together by Cal.
  - Karla Faye Gideon (portrayed by Drea de Matteo): A woman on the Index and former nurse with scalpel-implanted nails who allies with Cal.
  - Wendell Levi (portrayed by Ric Sarabia): A master computer hacker who allies with Cal.
  - Francis Noche (portrayed by Geo Corvera): A former mob enforcer allied with Cal who gained super-strength after taking experimental steroids.
  - David A. Angar (portrayed by Jeff Daniel Phillips): A S.H.I.E.L.D. prisoner allied with Cal whose vocal cords produce catatonia-rendering sounds.
- Tomas Calderon (portrayed by Kirk Acevedo): A "real S.H.I.E.L.D." leader. He was critically injured by Skye.
- Oliver (portrayed by Mark Allan Stewart): A "real S.H.I.E.L.D." leader. He was killed by Jiaying.
- O'Brien (portrayed by Derek Phillips): A S.H.I.E.L.D. agent. He is later transformed into a Primitive Inhuman.
- Eva Belyakov (portrayed by Winter Ave Zoli): An Inhuman killed by May in Bahrain.
- Katya Belyakov (portrayed by Ava Acres): A young Inhuman killed by May in Bahrain. In the Framework, Katya was not killed by May and began attending school in Cambridge, Massachusetts where she would later cause the "Cambridge Incident" that enabled Hydra's rise to power.
- Jiaying's assistant (portrayed by Brendan Wayne): An unnamed Inhuman loyal to Jiaying.

George Stephanopoulos makes a cameo appearance as himself.

=== Introduced in season three ===
- William May (portrayed by James Hong): Melinda May's father.
- Will Daniels (portrayed by Dillon Casey): An astronaut stranded on Maveth who falls in love with Simmons and sacrifices himself to save her from Hive.
- Victor Ramon (portrayed by Yancey Arias): A corrupt police officer of the National Police of Colombia who killed Francisco.
- Lucio (portrayed by Gabriel Salvador): An Inhuman and member of the National Police of Colombia who can temporarily paralyze people with his gaze. Lucio was abducted by Hydra and swayed to serve Hive. He is killed by Joey Gutierrez.
- Francisco Rodriguez (portrayed by Paul Lincoln Alayo as an adult, Lucas Amandariz as a young boy): The cousin of Elena who assisted in her activities. He was killed by Victor Ramon.
- Anton Petrov (portrayed by Ravil Isyanov): A Russian delegate planning an Inhuman sanctuary that is allied with Gideon Malick. He is killed by Lance Hunter.
- Stephanie Malick (portrayed by Bethany Joy Lenz): Gideon's daughter. She is killed by Hive.
- Dimitri Olshenko (portrayed by Endre Hules): The Prime Minister of Russia.
- Androvich (portrayed by Kristof Konrad): A Russian General and Inhuman who can manifest and control Darkforce shadow beings. He was killed by Bobbi Morse.
- Ruben Mackenzie (portrayed by Gaius Charles): Mack's brother.
- Charles Hinton (portrayed by Bjørn Johnson): An Inhuman. When he touches someone, he sees and shows them a vision of a future death. He died saving Daisy from Gideon Malick while showing how he will die.
- Kirk Vogel (portrayed by Mark Atteberry): A member of Gideon Malick's inner-circle who was loyal to Hive. He dies along with two others Hydra members inner-circle, during Holden Radcliffe's experiment.
- Walter Thomas (portrayed by Dorian Gregory): An undersecretary in the Department of Defense.
- Robin Hinton / Seer (portrayed by Willow Hale as an old woman, Ava Kolker as age 12, Lexy Kolker as age 7): The daughter of Charles and Polly Hinton. Her Terrigenesis enabled her to see into the past, present, and future, which led to a prophecy that enabled Enoch to send most of Phil Coulson's group to the year 2091 to save humanity. However, this left her unable to differentiate between the three. In 2091, an elderly Robin resides in the Zephyr's wreckage with surviving humans on the remaining piece of Earth. After being stabbed by Samuel Voss and dying in Melinda May's arms, she tells May about a vision revolving around Flint. When Coulson's group returns to the past, Robin helps them stop General Hale. A gravitonium-enhanced Glenn Talbot later abducts Robin and Polly to force them to help him find untapped gravitonium, though Mack and Fitz rescue them.

Noelle Mabry, Frank Moran, and Ralph Lammie, contestants on the "reality" web series Agents of S.H.I.E.L.D.: Academy, make cameo appearances as S.H.I.E.L.D. agents.

=== Introduced in season four ===
- Nathan B. Nathanson (portrayed by Blaise Miller): A S.H.I.E.L.D. lab tech. Killed by Aida.
- Prince (portrayed by Ricardo Walker): A S.H.I.E.L.D. agent. Killed by Aida/Ophelia.
- Chen (portrayed by Jen Kuo Sung): A Chinese gang leader allied with the Watchdogs. He is killed by Lucy Bauer.
- Frederick (portrayed by Dan Donohue): A scientist at Momentum Labs who was turned into a ghost by Morrow. He is exorcised by Ghost Rider.
- Hugo (portrayed by Ward Roberts): A scientist at Momentum Labs who was turned into a ghost by Morrow. He is exorcised by Ghost Rider.
- Vincent (portrayed by Usman Ally): A scientist at Momentum Labs who was turned into a ghost by Morrow. He is exorcised by Ghost Rider.
- Canelo (portrayed by Daniel Zacapa): Robbie Reyes' friendly, yet tough boss at Canelo's Body Shop.
- Cecilio (portrayed by Deren Tadlock): A S.H.I.E.L.D. agent that is loyal to Jeffrey Mace.
- Joseph Bauer (portrayed by Kerr Smith): Lucy's husband who was beaten into a coma by Eli Morrow. After Lucy uses her ghostly abilities to bring him out of a coma in order to learn the location of the Darkhold, Joseph was visited by Coulson and Mac where he died from the side effects of Lucy's ghostly touch.
- Johnny Blaze / Ghost Rider (portrayed by an uncredited Tom McComas): The Ghost Rider who gave Robbie Reyes his power.
- Vijay Nadeer (portrayed by Manish Dayal): Ellen Nadeer's Inhuman brother who developed super-speed. After being shot by his sister and dumped into a lake, Vijay underwent another Terrigenesis. In the Framework, Vijay is one of the captives of Hydra.
- Tucker Shockley (portrayed by John Pyper-Ferguson): A member of the Watchdogs who accidentally discovers his own Inhumanity where he can explode and then reassemble his molecules.
- Sunjna Nadeer (portrayed by Shari Vasseghi): Ellen and Vijay's mother who died during the Chitauri's attack on New York.
- L. T. Koenig (portrayed by Artemis Pebdani): A S.H.I.E.L.D. agent and sister to the Koenig brothers.
- Alistair Fitz (portrayed by David O'Hara): Fitz's father. He is first seen in the Framework as a supporter of Hydra and a loving father of Fitz until he was accidentally killed by Simmons.

George Stephanopoulos once again makes a cameo appearance as himself.

=== Introduced in season five ===
- Virgil (portrayed by Deniz Akdeniz): A member of the Lighthouse who believed S.H.I.E.L.D. would travel to the year 2091 and save humanity. He was killed by a Vrellnexian.
- Zev (portrayed by Kaleti Williams): A right-hand man of Grill. After being busted for having a weapon in violation of the Lighthouse rules, Zev was sent down to Earth's surface where he was killed by the Vrellnexians.
- Ava (portrayed by Tunisha Hubbard): An inhabitant of the Lighthouse and one of Kasius' many slaves. During the final battle against Kasius, Ava was freed by Jemma Simmons following Hek-Sel's death and evacuated to the trawler by Flint.
- Basha (portrayed by Rya Kihlstedt): An unspecified alien noblewoman who is one of Kasius' acquaintances.
- Tye (portrayed by Max Williams): An Inhuman combat trainer under Kasius at the Lighthouse. After being subjected to a Kree medicine while escorting the remaining Inhumans to another part of the Lighthouse, Tye is killed by Daisy Johnson.
- Abby (portrayed by Ciara Bravo): A young Inhuman with density manipulation who Kasius has Simmons train. After defeating Basha's champion in the Lighthouse's arena called the Crater, Abby was sold to Basha by Kasius.
- Ben (portrayed by Myko Olivier): An Inhuman living on the Lighthouse. He can read the minds of others within his vicinity allowing him to hear their thoughts. After aiding in the cover-up of the rest of Phil Coulson's team being on the Lighthouse, Ben is killed by Sinara on Kasius' orders.
- Gaius Ponarian (portrayed by Patrick Fabian): An unspecified alien senator who is one of Kasius' acquaintances and wanted to buy Daisy Johnson as his slave. At one point, he sold a Vrellnexian litter to Kasius.
- Karaba (portrayed by Erika Ervin): A tall unspecified alien noblewoman with a brutal and crazed personality who is one of Kasius' acquaintances. She is a rival of Senator Ponarian.
- Faulnak (portrayed by Samuel Roukin): The brother of Kasius who helps his father oversee the Kree Empire. He was killed by his own brother.
- Maston-Dar (portrayed by Remington Hoffman): A Kree soldier employed by Faulnak. He was killed by Sinara during the Kree's hunt for Phil Coulson's group.
- Samuel Voss (portrayed by Michael McGrady): A member of the True Believers community residing on the surface of the post-Apocalyptic Earth. He used to be a resident of the Lighthouse before he alongside many other True Believers were exiled to the remainder of Earth's surface.
- Hek-Sel (portrayed by Luke Massy): A Kree Watch member who is loyal to Kasius. He and his fellow Kree were killed by Flint.
- Rick Stoner (portrayed by Patrick Warburton): A general and member of S.H.I.E.L.D. in the 1970s, who established the Lighthouse as an emergency bunker. Following the early development of Project Insight, the Chronicoms tried to steal his face only for them to be thwarted by the Phil Coulson LMD and Melinda May. Rick is advised by May to come up with a cover-up of what happened.
- Noah (portrayed by Joel David Moore): A Chronicom that meets with Coulson and his team at the Lighthouse when they return to present day. He sacrifices himself to save Daisy and Fitz from a Kree beacon that General Hale rigged to explode.
- Candice Lee (portrayed by Shontae Saldana): One of General Hale's main subordinates who assists in the hunt for Phil Coulson's group.
- Tony Caine (portrayed by Jake Busey): An ex-S.H.I.E.L.D. Academy student and friend of Mack's who aids Phil Coulson's group in locating gravitonium. After helping place Polly and Robin Hinton in a safe location, he gives Daisy the Project Centipede device and information on what empowered John Garrett, which leads Daisy to exhume Jiaying's grave.
- Alya (portrayed by Katie Amanda Keane as an adult; Harlow Happy Hexum as a child): Deke's deceased mother and Fitz and Simmons' future daughter.
- Estella (portrayed by Nayo Wallace): A representative of an unspecified alien race and member of the Confederacy.
- Magei (portrayed by E.R. Ruiz): A representative of the Rajaks and member of the Confederacy.
- Joqo (portrayed by Matthew Foster): A representative of the Kallusians and member of the Confederacy.
- Crixon (portrayed by Gabriel Hogan): A representative of the Astrans and member of the Confederacy and the wisest of the bunch. He was absorbed into the Gravitonium by Talbot when he wouldn't allow a human into the Confederacy.
- Taryan (portrayed by Craig Parker): A Kree representative of the Confederacy and a present-day member of the House of Kasius.

Derek Mears cameos as a Kree Watch Captain that tortures Mack and Yo-Yo until he is killed by Mack. Jay Hunter appears as a Kree Watch Commander. Isaac C. Singleton, Jr. appears as a Kree Vicar that oversees the Terrigenesis on the Lighthouse who is killed by Flint.

=== Introduced in season six ===
- Keller (portrayed by Lucas Bryant): A S.H.I.E.L.D. agent who became Yo-Yo's secondary love interest while Mack was busy. After he is possessed by a Shrike and crystallize the Lighthouse, Yo-Yo was forced to kill the parasite, at the cost of Keller's life.
- Trok (portrayed by Glenn Keogh): A D'Rillian that Quake and Simmons interrogate for Fitz and Enoch's location.
- Diaz (portrayed by Geri-Nikole Love): A S.H.I.E.L.D. Agent that was recruited by May under Mack's leadership.
- Tinker (portrayed by Xavier Jaminez): A member of Sarge's group and mechanical expert who did not fully manifest on Earth and was trapped in a cement wall. After briefly reviving in S.H.I.E.L.D. custody, he warns them that they can't stop what is coming. His final words were "Pachakutiq."
- Fox (portrayed by Levi Meaden): A S.H.I.E.L.D. Agent who joined at the recommendation of his friend Keller. While he apprehended Snowflake, he was fatally shot by Sarge's ICER.
- Viro (portrayed by Paul Telfer): A Sivian from the planet Sivos who is the Controller of his cargo spaceship that delivered Xandarian snail farms to other planets. He was shot out the airlock thanks to a trick by Fitz.
- Pretorious Pryce (portrayed by Clark Middleton): A Naro-Atzian ship inspector who inspects Zephyr One and later points its crew to the planet Kitson where Fitz and Enoch were heading.
- Boyle (portrayed by Scott Kruse): An alien mercenary who the Agents of S.H.I.E.L.D. hire to transport them across space in a ship called the Lazy Comet. He was later infected with one of Izel's Shrikes and was later killed when Jaco uses Sarge's nuke to blow up the Lazy Comet.
- Toad (portrayed by TJ Alvarado): An alien mercenary who the Agents of S.H.I.E.L.D. hire to transport them across space in a ship called the Lazy Comet. He was later infected with one of Izel's Shrikes and was later killed when Jaco uses Sarge's nuke to blow up the Lazy Comet.
- Montalban (portrayed by Louie Ski Carr): An Astran who works as an enforcer at the House of Games.
- Sequoia (portrayed by Maurissa Tancharoen): A Coachella-chic media influencer that works at Deke's tech company. She originally dated Deke, but later dated Trevor after he got her to safety.
- Trevor Khan (portrayed by Shainu Bala): A S.H.I.E.L.D. agent sent to keep an eye on Deke Shaw at his tech company under the alias of Savior. Sequoia later falls in love with him after he helped rescue her. Trevor and the S.H.I.E.L.D. agents with him were later killed off-screen when the Chronicom hunters laid siege to the Lighthouse.
- Atarah (portrayed by Sherri Saum): The lead Chronicom hunter with the appearance of a female who is the superior of Enoch and Malachi. She plotted to absorb FitzSimmons' memories in an effort to save her people. After Malachi learns some information from the Cerebral Fusion Machine, he recommends to Atarah that they should establish Chronyca-3. Atarah remains adamant that Chronyca-2 can be still saved, so Malachi shoots her and assumes command.
- Mr. Kitson (portrayed by Anthony Michael Hall): The ruler of the planet Kitson and proprietor of the House of Games which he inherited from his father and grandfather.
- Isaiah (portrayed by Jan Uddin): A Chronicom anthropologist who Enoch enlists to gather their broken civilization in order to rebuild it. Malachi reassigned him to hunter detail and attacks Enoch, but loses the battle and dies off-screen. Enoch would disguise himself as Isaiah to save Fitz and Simmons during Malachi's siege on the Lighthouse.
- Baal-Gad (portrayed by Christian Ochoa): A Chronicom hunter that works alongside Malachi.
- Thomas (portrayed by Robb Derringer): The husband of Marcus Benson who was put into a coma following a car accident, with Benson pulling his life support against the wishes of Thomas' family. Izel used the Di'Allas' energies to briefly recreate Thomas in order to get Benson to give her the location of the temple she is seeking.
- The First (performed by Eric Schloesser): An entity who's attached to the Black Monolith (a.k.a. The Space Di'Alla). It was killed by May.
- The Second (performed by Kevin Alexander Stea): An entity who's attached to the White Monolith (a.k.a. The Time Di'Alla). It was killed by May.
- The Third (performed by Gina Gonsalvas): An entity who's attached to the Grey Monolith (a.k.a. The Creation Di'Alla). It was killed by May.

=== Introduced in season seven ===
- Viola (portrayed by Nora Zehetner): A contact of Freddy's that works for Hydra.
- Tillman (portrayed by Greg Finley): The bartender of a speakeasy beneath a post office in 1931.
- Franklin D. Roosevelt (portrayed by Joseph Culp): The Governor of New York in 1931. When he became President of the United States, Franklin established the S.S.R. in 1940.
- Pascal Vega (portrayed by Julian Acosta): A S.H.I.E.L.D. scientist who worked at Area 51 in 1955.
- Gerald Sharpe (portrayed by Michael Gaston): A member of the United States Department of Defense in 1955 who the S.H.I.E.L.D. agents abducted to learn more about Project Helius.
- Tom (portrayed by Larry Clarke): A S.H.I.E.L.D. desk worker and a patron of The Krazy Kanoe.
- Lana (portrayed by Stephanie Drapeau): A Hydra agent who partook in the attack on Daniel Sousa on the train that he and the Phil Coulson L.M.D. were on.
- Joe (portrayed by Philip Alexander): A Hydra agent sent by Freddy to assassinate Daniel Sousa.
- Ford (portrayed by Dawan Owens): A S.H.I.E.L.D. agent who worked under Rick Stoner. His face was later stolen by a Chronicom who posed as him.
- John Mackenzie (portrayed by Sedale Threatt Jr.): Mack and Ruben's father from 1976. Because Freddy arranged for them to be detained, Mack had May and the Phil Coulson L.M.D. abort flooding the Lighthouse. After being rescued by Mack and Elena, they discover he had been replaced by a Chronicom. Mack snaps the Chronicom's neck and its body is dropped out of the Quinjet while it was in flight.
- Lilla Mackenzie (portrayed by Paulina Bugembe): Mack and Ruben's mother from 1976. Because Freddy arranged for them to be detained, Mack had May and the Phil Coulson L.M.D. abort flooding the Lighthouse. After being rescued by Mack and Elena, she was revealed to have been replaced by a Chronicom and was dropped out of the Quinjet while it was in flight.
- Olga Pachinko (portrayed by Jolene Anderson): A Balkan resistance member and demolitions expert who Deke recruited in 1983 to become a member of his new S.H.I.E.L.D. recruits as well as his band The Deke Squad.
- Russell Feldman (portrayed by Austin Basis): A lonely computer store employee from 1983 who Sybil uses to regain her physical form before having him killed once he served his purpose.
- Cricket (portrayed by Ryan Donowho): A cocaine dealer who Deke recruited into his band under the belief he sold Coca-Cola. He is killed by a robotic hunter.
- Roxy Glass (portrayed by Tipper Newton): A tactical expert who Deke recruited in 1983 to become a member of his new S.H.I.E.L.D. recruits as well as his band The Deke Squad.
- Ronnie and Tommy Chang (portrayed by Matt and John Yuan): Twin brothers collectively known as "The Chang Gang" who Deke recruited in 1983 to become new S.H.I.E.L.D. recruits as well as members of his band The Deke Squad.
- Marcus Mackenzie (portrayed by Marcus Jordan): The uncle of Mack and Ruben who watches over them after the loss of their parents.
- Li (portrayed by Byron Mann): An Inhuman with the ability to materialize knives and Jiaying's second-in-command in 1983. During Nathaniel Malick's raid on Afterlife, Li is grievously injured before his powers are transplanted to one of Nathaniel's men and Kora kills him.
- Oscar Rodriguez (portrayed by Ricardo Cisneros): The uncle of Elena and father of Francisco who took the former after the death of her father. He was killed in a struggle with a drug dealer.
- Javier (portrayed by David Bianchi): A drug dealer who was responsible for the death of Elena's father and Oscar Rodriguez.
- Durant (portrayed by Gabriel Sousa): A mercenary who is said to have originally died in a plane crash. Using the Chronicoms' future knowledge, Nathaniel averted his death and recruited him into his ranks before Kora killed him.
- Dr. Grady (portrayed by John Lee Ames): A scientist who worked on dangerous technology and killed by S.H.I.E.L.D. for it. Using the Chronicoms' future knowledge, Nathaniel averted his death and recruited him into his ranks, assigning him the task of overseeing Inhuman power transplants.
- Kimball (portrayed by Katy M. O'Brian): A mercenary working under Nathaniel.
- Shepard (portrayed by Christopher Charles): One of Nathaniel Malick's men, whom he kills for angering him.
- Brandon Gamble (portrayed by Stephen Bishop): A S.H.I.E.L.D. agent from 1983 who survives the Chronicoms' assault and meets up with the other agents at The Krazy Kanoe.
- Grace Mulcahey (portrayed by Cassandra Ballard): A female S.H.I.E.L.D. agent from 1983 who survives the Chronicoms' assault and meets up with the other agents at The Krazy Kanoe.

Bill Cobbs portrays an unnamed elderly S.H.I.E.L.D. agent who arrives to offer the final 0-8-4 left to him by Enoch.

== See also ==
- Agents of S.H.I.E.L.D.: Slingshot cast and characters
- List of Marvel Cinematic Universe television series actors (ABC)
- List of S.H.I.E.L.D. members
