= Lockup (Agents of S.H.I.E.L.D.) =

- Agents of S.H.I.E.L.D. episode
- The idea of Ghost Rider breaking into a prison, and the inmates locking themselves in their cells, was first pitched as part of another episode before becoming the basis of this one.
- Episode no.: Season 4 Episode 5
- Directed by: Kate Woods
- Written by: Nora Zuckerman; Lilla Zuckerman
- Cinematography by: Feliks Parnell
- Editing by: Dexter N. Adriano
- Original air date: October 25, 2016

Guest appearances
- Gabriel Luna as Robbie Reyes / Ghost Rider; Parminder Nagra as Ellen Nadeer; José Zúñiga as Eli Morrow; Lilli Birdsell as Lucy Bauer; Kerr Smith as Joseph Bauer; Rolando Molina as Santino Noguera; Ward Roberts as Hugo; Usman Ally as Vincent; Jason O'Mara as Jeffrey Mace; George Stephanopolous as himself

Episode chronology
← Previous "Let Me Stand Next to Your Fire"	Next → "The Good Samaritan"
- Agents of S.H.I.E.L.D. season 4

"Lockup" is the fifth episode of the fourth season of the American television series Agents of S.H.I.E.L.D. Based on the Marvel Comics organization S.H.I.E.L.D., it follows Phil Coulson and his team of S.H.I.E.L.D. agents as they attempt a prison breakout. It is set in the Marvel Cinematic Universe (MCU) and acknowledges the franchise's films. The episode was written by Nora and Lilla Zuckerman, and directed by Kate Woods.

Clark Gregg reprises his role as Coulson from the film series, and is joined by series regulars Ming-Na Wen, Chloe Bennet, Iain De Caestecker, Elizabeth Henstridge, and Henry Simmons. The episode's story came from an unused pitch that Lilla Zuckerman made during the writing of the earlier episode "Uprising", about Ghost Rider breaking into a prison. It was filmed partly in a real prison and partly on constructed sets, and has a subplot inspired by the film Broadcast News that includes connections to the MCU film Captain America: Civil War. The episode is part of the first "pod" of eight episodes for the season, subtitled Ghost Rider.

"Lockup" originally aired on ABC on October 25, 2016, and was watched by 4.55 million viewers within a week of its release. The episode received mostly positive reviews, with critics highlighting its action sequences, use of Ghost Rider, and character-focused moments such as those between Daisy Johnson (Bennet) and Melinda May (Wen), and between May and Coulson. The effects used for the episode's ghostly antagonists were criticized.

== Plot ==
After years of searching, scientists Joseph and Lucy Bauer discovered the Darkhold, the Book of Sin, and began to study it. Years later, S.H.I.E.L.D. agents Phil Coulson and Alphonso "Mack" Mackenzie question Joseph, who has just been woken up from a coma by the apparent ghost of Lucy. He tells them that Lucy has possession of the book, and dies. Coulson decides not to tell the new Director of S.H.I.E.L.D., Jeffrey Mace, about this, not knowing if he can trust Mace yet. They decide to go get Eli Morrow, another scientist who was jailed for putting Joseph in the coma, out of prison.

At the prison, Coulson and agent Melinda May find the staff have been turned against them by Lucy's ghostly influence. Defending themselves, they call Mack for backup. He arrives with Daisy Johnson / Quake—a rogue agent that has only recently joined back with the team—and Robbie Reyes / Ghost Rider—a demon-like vigilante and Morrow's nephew, as well as a newly developed antidote to Lucy's influence. Meanwhile, Mace is debating the anti-Inhuman Senator Ellen Nadeer on live television, who brings up the prison situation which he is not aware of. Faced with further questions from Nadeer, Mace reveals that he is an Inhuman himself.

Lucy opens the prison cells, starting a riot, and Johnson fends off a large group of prisoners with help from May and Coulson even after trying to shut them out. Mack and Reyes find Morrow, who is hesitant to trust S.H.I.E.L.D. but agrees to leave with them when he hears that Lucy has the Darkhold. Morrow is directed to safety, while Reyes stops to confront one of the prisoners, a member of the gang who was responsible for him becoming the Ghost Rider. The prisoner reveals that they were hired to carry out the job, but he does not know who did it, before the Ghost Rider murders him. Outside the prison, Morrow is found by Lucy who needs his help to read the Darkhold and revert her ghostly state.

May talks to Johnson about her recent isolationist approach to their group, and tries to convince her to rejoin S.H.I.E.L.D. and be with them, but Johnson insists that after the issue with the Darkhold is solved she will be leaving once again. Mace later meets with Nadeer in person, and she blackmails him with footage of S.H.I.E.L.D. working with the Ghost Rider.

== Production ==
=== Development and writing ===
In October 2016, Marvel revealed that the fifth episode of the season would be titled "Lockup". It is written by Nora and Lilla Zuckerman, with Kate Woods directing. The episode was the first of the series to be written by the Zuckermans, and is part of the first "pod" of eight episodes for the fourth season, subtitled Ghost Rider.

The original idea for the episode came when the writers were helping break the story for the episode "Uprising", which includes large-scale blackouts. Lilla said that a blackout would be a perfect opportunity for Ghost Rider to break into a prison and murder criminals. The series' writers room all loved the idea of seeing Ghost Rider walking through a prison as all the inmates run back into their cells, but the situation did not fit into the episode. Several weeks later, when the room began discussing the fifth episode of the season, they had established that Ghost Rider's uncle Eli Morrow was in prison and from there they decided to use the Ghost Rider prison break as the basis for the new episode.

The writers wanted Daisy Johnson's story to be prominent in the episode since this is the first episode where she is working with the rest of the team during the season. They also realized that this is the first episode that Phil Coulson and Melinda May are together in a while so they wanted the episode to be an "awkward, tension-filled family reunion". Their script originally featured a heart-to-heart between Johnson and Coulson, but executive producer Jed Whedon suggested that it instead be between Johnson and May, a change that Nora said "made the episode sing". Lilla said this change allowed the scene to give insight on how important Coulson is to May.

Whedon also encouraged the writers to have Mexican characters speak Spanish with one another, which was the first time the Zuckermans had written for a language other than English. For Jemma Simmons and Jeffrey Mace's subplot in the episode, the writers were inspired by the film Broadcast News (1987). The episode is also a "turning point" for the Ghost Rider pod, with Morrow's release from prison moving the story arc into a new section, and so the writers included elements to set-up future episodes. This included a poster of the Quentin Carnival in the background of the opening scene to hint at the future appearance of the character Johnny Blaze.

=== Casting and filming ===
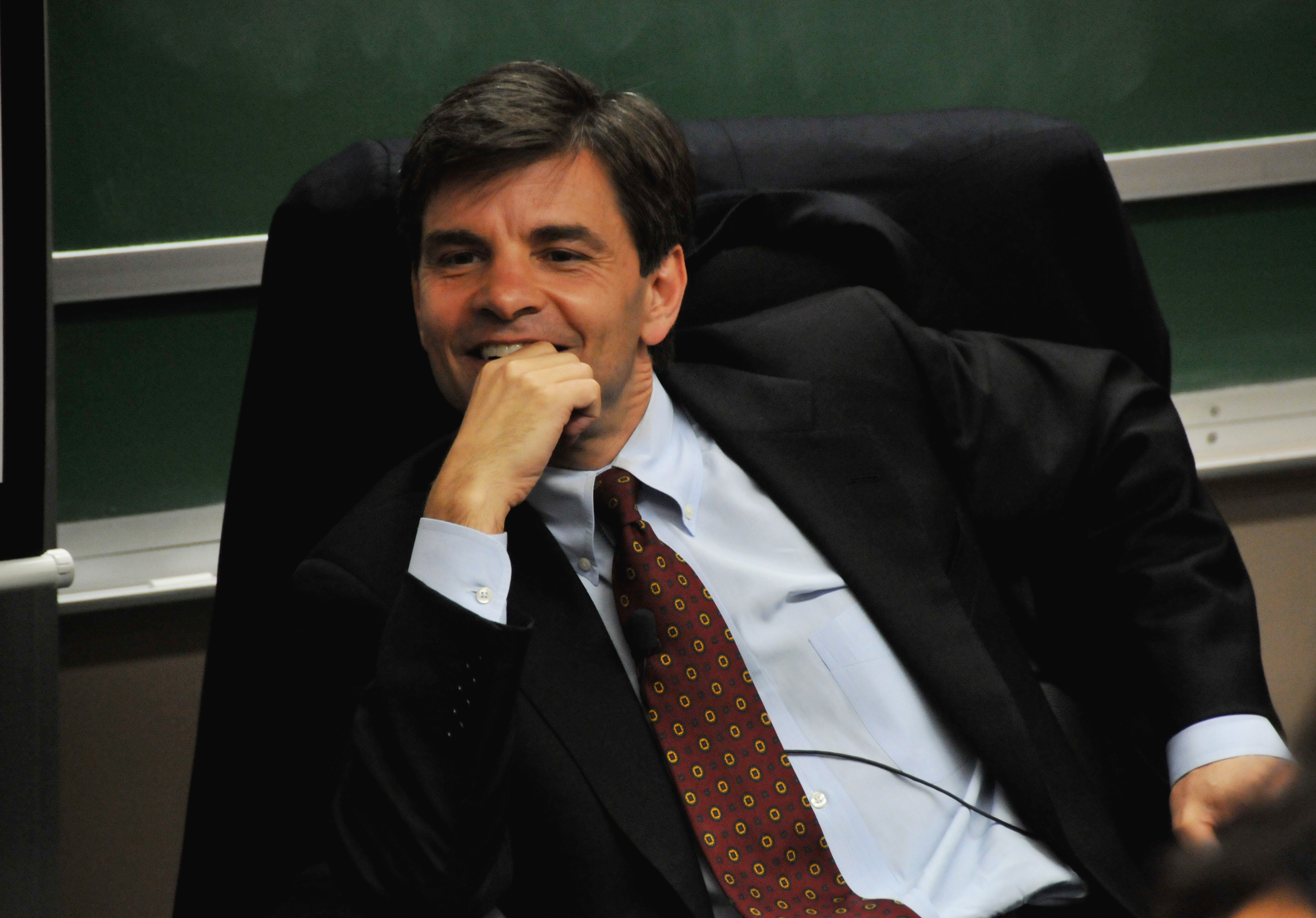
News anchor George Stephanopoulos appears in the episode, interviewing the characters Jeffrey Mace and Ellen Nadeer.

In October 2016, Marvel confirmed that main cast members Clark Gregg as Phil Coulson, Ming-Na Wen as Melinda May, Chloe Bennet as Daisy Johnson / Quake, Iain De Caestecker as Leo Fitz, Elizabeth Henstridge as Jemma Simmons, Henry Simmons as Alphonso "Mack" Mackenzie, and John Hannah as Holden Radcliffe would be starring in the episode.

Also revealed was the guest cast for the episode, including Jason O'Mara as Director Jeffrey Mace, Gabriel Luna as Robbie Reyes, Parminder Nagra as Senator Ellen Nadeer, Maximilian Osinski as Agent Davis, Patrick Cavanaugh as Burrows, José Zúñiga as Eli Morrow, Kerr Smith as Joseph Bauer, James Edson as Warden Green, Ricardo Walker as Agent Prince, Sky Soleil as corrections officer, Rolando Molina as Santino, Brandon Keener as Harlan, Jermaine Jacox as ferocious watchdog, Lilli Birdsell as Lucy Bauer, Ward Roberts as Hugo, Usman Ally as Vincent and Devin Barry as producer. O'Mara, Luna, Nagra, Osinski, Cavanaugh, Zúñiga, Smith, Walker, Birdsell, Roberts, and Ally reprise their roles from earlier in the series. George Stephanopolous also appears in the episode, as himself.

The episode's prison setting was realized with a mixture of location filming at a real prison, and constructed sets. The first scene shot for the episode was the heart-to-heart between Johnson and May. As big fans of Stephen King, the writers had the character Santino read a Spanish version of King's book Pet Sematary (1983) while in his jail cell. For the prop of the Darkhold, introduced in this episode, Lilla suggested that the book's cover should feature the word "Darkhold" as an ambigram, with the series' props department designing a new font to achieve this. The prop department had two weeks to create the book before it was needed for filming the episode, with the final book assembled by a bookbinder using aged, vellum pages that were filled with text and illustrations inspired by Leonardo da Vinci's Vitruvian Man.

=== Marvel Cinematic Universe tie-ins ===
The episode reveals that Mace became a public hero after the bombing of a United Nations meeting in Vienna, an event depicted in Captain America: Civil War (2016). Mace was one of the many diplomats at the meeting, and was photographed saving another's life. However, the episode does indicate that Mace may not be telling the truth about this.

== Release ==
"Lockup" was first aired in the United States on ABC on October 25, 2016. It began streaming on Netflix, along with the rest of the fourth season, on June 15, 2017.

== Reception ==
=== Ratings ===
In the United States the episode received a 0.8/3 percent share among adults between the ages of 18 and 49, meaning that it was seen by 0.8 percent of all households, and 3 percent of all of those watching television at the time of the broadcast. It was watched by 2.30 million viewers. Within a week of its release, "Lockup" had been watched by 4.55 million U.S. viewers, just above the season average of 4.22 million.

=== Critical response ===
Writing for The A.V. Club, Alex McCown-Levy graded the episode a "B+", calling it "a fast-moving and fun adventure, the kind of race-against-time scenario that remains the series' strong suit [which] played to the show's strengths on numerous levels". He highlighted Johnson's fight against the prisoners, and Woods' direction of that scene, as well as the heart-to-heart between Johnson and May. McCown-Levy also felt "the show is having the most narratively efficient season yet, effectively balancing mission-of-the-week adventures with the longer plots", but was critical of Lucy and the villains. Terri Schwartz at IGN scored the episode an eight out of ten, indicating a "great" episode, and said the highlight was the action and choreography. Schwartz also noted character-focused moments such as the Johnson and May heart-to-heart and the revelations about Mace, while highly criticizing the ghost effects, saying, "Maybe it's Lucy's makeup or maybe it's the downside of having a TV show budget, but the look of these affected beings takes me out of the episode whenever they appear. Because of that ... "Lockup" didn't pop as much as last week's "Let Me Stand Next to Your Fire".

Marc Buxton of Den of Geek scored the episode three out of five stars, calling it filler, but fun, and saying that the Ghost Rider prison sequence "made the episode" for him. Buxton said he "digs" the connections made between Mac and Civil War, but felt the end of that subplot with Simmons was confusing and could have been made clearer. Kevin Fitzpatrick of ScreenCrush said the series "deserves some credit for venturing into" the prison breakout trope, and thought the action sequences were impressive, but felt that Johnson's storyline was "nowhere near as compelling as the series wants it to be" and contrived, and said that the Mace/Simmons subplot was "consistently dashing any energy or momentum built up from the prison scenes". Fitzpatrick also criticized the ghost effects. Collider's Evan Valentine gave the episode four stars out of five, indicating a "very good" episode, saying, "When Agents of S.H.I.E.L.D. is at its best, it manages to find something interesting and worthwhile for each of its cast to dig their teeth into, and this episode is one of the most on-point examples of that we've seen this season." He highlighted the action scenes, character interactions, and the Ghost Rider visual effects.

Danny Hale at Flickering Myth said "Lockup" is "a really, really fun episode", and was thankful that Johnson rejoining S.H.I.E.L.D. was not "resolved without the appropriate time for the audience to feel her absence". Hale also noted the introduction of the Darkhold, Coulson and May's interactions, and the added mystery to Mace's character as all things that make "for good viewing and has me hooked for next week." Vulture's Scott Meslow scored the episode three stars out of 5, feeling the season was lacking a "truly compelling villain" and saying the ghost effects look "absolutely terrible". Meslow said the prison scenes had "quippy dialogue" and "solid action scenes", but was more interested in the Mace and Simmons storyline. For Nerdist, Joseph McCabe said, "When S.H.I.E.L.D. is at its best, it doesn't offer viewers much to dissect. Because it's all about its momentum, [and this] is a textbook example: forty-two minutes of adrenaline without a single wasted moment." He felt the episode had several satisfying character-based moments, especially the scenes between Coulson and May, and though McCabe felt Woods was not the most "adept at staging fight sequences", he still praised the choreography of Johnson's action scenes.
