= Let Me Stand Next to Your Fire =

- Agents of S.H.I.E.L.D. episode
- Teaser poster, featuring art by Francesco Francavilla
- Episode no.: Season 4 Episode 4
- Directed by: Brad Turner
- Written by: Matt Owens
- Cinematography by: Allan Westbrook
- Original air date: October 18, 2016

Guest appearances
- Gabriel Luna as Robbie Reyes / Ghost Rider; Axle Whitehead as J. T. James / Hellfire; Mallory Jansen as Aida; José Zúñiga as Eli Morrow; Lilli Birdsell as Lucy Bauer; Kerr Smith as Joseph Bauer

Episode chronology
← Previous "Uprising"	Next → "Lockup"
- Agents of S.H.I.E.L.D. season 4

"Let Me Stand Next to Your Fire" is the fourth episode of the fourth season of the American television series Agents of S.H.I.E.L.D. Based on the Marvel Comics organization S.H.I.E.L.D., it follows Phil Coulson and his team of S.H.I.E.L.D. agents as they deal with the Watchdogs terrorist group and a group of ghosts. It is set in the Marvel Cinematic Universe (MCU) and acknowledges the franchise's films. The episode was written by Matt Owens, and directed by Brad Turner.

Clark Gregg reprises his role as Coulson from the film series, and is joined by series regulars Ming-Na Wen, Chloe Bennet, Iain De Caestecker, Elizabeth Henstridge, Henry Simmons, and John Hannah. A central action scene sees a car chase featuring Coulson's flying car Lola and Robbie Reyes's (recurring guest Gabriel Luna) "Hell Charger" Lucy. The episode also guest stars José Zúñiga as Reyes' uncle, Eli Morrow, as backstory for the Ghost Rider character is explored, as well as seeing Axle Whitehead return as J. T. James to continue the season's Inhuman and Watchdogs storyline. It is part of the first "pod" of eight episodes for the season, subtitled Ghost Rider.

"Let Me Stand Next to Your Fire" originally aired on ABC on October 18, 2016, and was watched by 4.78 million viewers within a week of its release. The episode received a positive critical response, with praise going to the car chase, the episode's use of James, and its balance of the season's various storylines.

== Plot ==
While looking at apartments for herself and S.H.I.E.L.D. agent Leo Fitz, agent Jemma Simmons comes across former agent Daisy Johnson, now the Inhuman vigilante Quake, injured. Simmons tends to Johnson's injuries while the latter explains that she has been tracking the Watchdogs terrorist group, who she believes has hacked into S.H.I.E.L.D.'s list of registered Inhumans. Johnson wants access to the list as well, to see who the Watchdogs' next target is, and coerces Simmons into helping her.

Agent Phil Coulson visits Eli Morrow in prison to ask him about his work at Momentum Energy labs; Morrow's co-workers there appear to have been killed in an explosion and returned as ghosts. Coulson promises to get Morrow released if he cooperates, but Morrow refuses. Outside the prison, Morrow's nephew Robbie Reyes arrives to also ask his uncle about Momentum, but agent Alphonso "Mack" Mackenzie recognizes Reyes as the vigilante Ghost Rider, and he and Coulson chase Reyes in Coulson's car. The chase ends when Reyes drives into S.H.I.E.L.D.'s invisible quinjet, and the agents take Reyes into custody. Coulson convinces Reyes to help their investigation into Momentum by speaking to Morrow on S.H.I.E.L.D.'s behalf, and he learns that Momentum's misfortunes came about from studying a mysterious book, the Darkhold.

With Simmons' help, Johnson discovers that the Watchdogs have hacked S.H.I.E.L.D.'s list using tracking wristwatches given to all registered Inhumans. The next Inhuman on the list is J. T. James, an Inhuman with explosive abilities who spent time with Johnson under the influence of the parasitic Inhuman Hive. Johnson and Simmons remove James's wristwatch, but he betrays them to the Watchdogs with the promise that they would kill him once he helped destroy the other Inhumans—James admits being so traumatized after being freed from Hive that he regrets going through Terrigenesis and has come to hate himself and his Inhuman identity. Before they can investigate the Darkhold, Coulson and Mack are alerted to James's wristwatch being removed, and arrive along with Reyes to help Johnson and Simmons fight off the Watchdogs and arrest James.

Coulson, Mack, Simmons, Johnson, and Reyes join up with agent Melinda May, who has been recovering from a mysterious illness, to go find the Darkhold. Her recovery was overseen by Aida, the new assistant of S.H.I.E.L.D. ally Holden Radcliffe, and Simmons immediately recognizes Aida as an android.

== Production ==
=== Development ===
Promotion for Agents of S.H.I.E.L.D.'s fourth season at San Diego Comic Con featured flaming chains, leading to speculation that the series would be introducing the character of Ghost Rider. Though this speculation turned out to be true, with Gabriel Luna cast in that role and introduced with the start of the season, some commentators noted that the series already featured a character who wielded a flaming chain, Axle Whitehead's James. In October 2016, Marvel revealed that James would also be returning for the season alongside Luna's Ghost Rider, with both characters set to appear in the fourth episode of the season. Titled "Let Me Stand Next to Your Fire", a line from the Jimi Hendrix song "Fire", the episode was written by Matt Owens, with Brad Turner directing. Owens previously wrote for the Marvel Television Netflix series Luke Cage. "Let Me Stand Next to Your Fire" is part of the season's Ghost Rider "pod" of episodes, consisting of the first eight episodes.

=== Casting and writing ===
In October 2016, Marvel confirmed that main cast members Clark Gregg as Phil Coulson, Ming-Na Wen as Melinda May, Chloe Bennet as Daisy Johnson / Quake, Iain De Caestecker as Leo Fitz, Elizabeth Henstridge as Jemma Simmons, Henry Simmons as Alphonso "Mack" Mackenzie, and John Hannah as Holden Radcliffe would be starring in the episode.

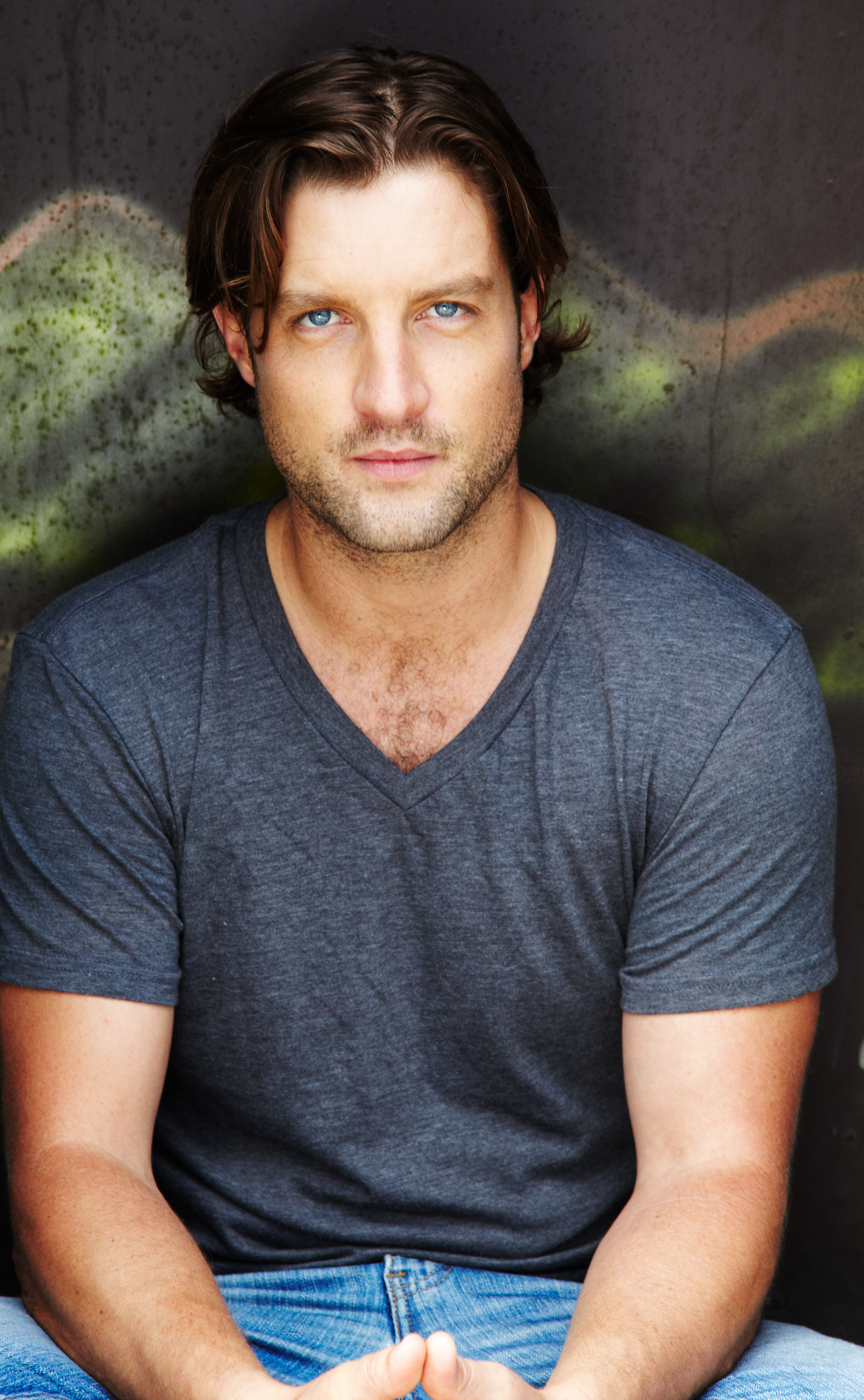
Guest star Axle Whitehead returns from the third season as the Inhuman J. T. James.

In addition to Gabriel Luna as Robbie Reyes and Axle Whitehead as J. T. James, guest stars for the episode include Mallory Jansen as Aida, José Zúñiga as Eli Morrow, Kerr Smith as Joseph, Phil Tyler as watchdog #1, Sergio Enrique as guard, Tanner Fontana as Elliot and Lilli Birdsell as Lucy Bauer. Luna, Jansen, Whitehead, and Birdsell reprise their roles from earlier in the series.

Following the airing of the previous episode, executive producer Jed Whedon teased that "Let Me Stand Next to Your Fire" would explore the dynamic between Luna's Ghost Rider, Robbie Reyes, and Elias Morrow, his uncle, but would be "pivoting from the storyline in the comics. We're pulling the characters, the character names and the relationships, but I think you can already feel that we've changed it. Those dynamics will be entirely different. We're using them as inspiration."

When asked whether the series still wanted to pursue stories about Inhumans such as James, Whedon said they are "still in our world, so we still have some of these people in the mix ... but right now we're on the Ghost Rider kick." On having Johnson and Reyes join up with S.H.I.E.L.D., Whedon called it uneasy "for everyone involved. Daisy has made it very clear that she doesn't want to be with our team. There's all that history and pain there. For Robbie, this is a guy who has never had a team, and probably doesn't function well within one. We'll see pretty quickly that it's an uneasy alliance and it's going to cause a lot of drama."

Discussing Simmons' actions in the episode, Henstridge noted that the previous episodes in the season had established the character's new position high in the S.H.I.E.L.D. hierarchy so that this episode could see her abuse that power, using her position to help her friends, including the now ex-S.H.I.E.L.D. agent Johnson, rather than the agency of its director. Henstridge said that "this is the whole reason that she [got herself into a position of power] but it is a turning point for because in that moment she could've gone the other way" and chose to protect her new position. Henstridge appreciated the episode exploring the relationship between Simmons and Johnson, feeling that there was "so much bad blood" between them after the events of the third season that could be explored. She compared this to a relationship between sisters.

=== Filming and effects ===
The episode's central car chase features Coulson's flying 1962 Chevrolet Corvette, Lola, chasing Reyes' fiery "Hellcharger", a 1969 Dodge Charger nicknamed Lucy. The sequence was filmed in Los Angeles, with location scouting for the sequence beginning by searching for an ideal corner for the Charger to make "a big hard left". The streets around the corner were then augmented with directed traffic in a "near-miss configuration", to make the sequence more dynamic—it sees the Charger weaving between the other vehicles, and them veering away in the opposite direction for added effect. One stunt sees a large truck backing out of a driveway, with the stunt team timing it so that the Charger can drive around the back, but the much smaller Lola has to drive underneath it.

In the episode's climactic fight between Reyes and James in a fireworks factory, a moment sees James burn through a brick wall, and the two falling 10 feet (3 m) into the factory below. The sequence was choreographed with two stunt doubles descending through a fake wall on wires, but on the day the filming schedule was changed and there was no longer time to set up the wire rig. Instead, the stunt team had the doubles fall through the wall without wires, and land on pads below, which stunt coordinator Tanner Gill said ultimately "worked really effectively". For the subsequent fireworks factory explosion, a practical explosion was created by the series effects team, and then CG fireworks were added by Pixomondo. The practical explosion shook all the stages around the ABC Studios lot.

== Release ==
"Let Me Stand Next to Your Fire" was first aired in the United States on ABC on October 18, 2016. Ahead of the episode's airing, Marvel released a teaser poster depicting Ghost Rider and his Hellcharger, with the pod's promotional title Agents of S.H.I.E.L.D.: Ghost Rider. The poster was drawn by comic book artist Francesco Francavilla. Luna promoted the episode as Lola vs. Lucy, referring to the episode's car chase. The episode began streaming on Netflix, along with the rest of the fourth season, on June 15, 2017.

== Reception ==
=== Ratings ===
In the United States the episode received a 0.7/3 percent share among adults between the ages of 18 and 49, meaning that it was seen by 0.7 percent of all households, and 3 percent of all of those watching television at the time of the broadcast. It was watched by 2.34 million viewers. Within a week of its release, "Let Me Stand Next to Your Fire" had been watched by 4.78 million U.S. viewers, above the season average of 4.22 million.

=== Critical response ===
Writing for Nerdist, Joseph McCabe praised the chemistry between the series' main characters and the performance of Jansen as Aida, but said "most of this is just preamble to the sight of two guys with a lot of attitude and similar pyrokinetic powers unleashing holy hell on one another in a building chock full of explosives. I am more than okay with this." The A.V. Club's Alex McLevy graded the episode a "B", praising the episode for focusing the season's overarching storyline and for the emotional reunions between Johnson and the core S.H.I.E.L.D. agents. He was positive of the ongoing Ghost Rider storyline and the episode's action sequences, but thought Aida's story was "the much more intriguing long-term story ... it offers the unusual opportunity for Agents Of S.H.I.E.L.D. to dig into some juicy subtext and weighty concepts".

Kevin Fitzpatrick of ScreenCrush felt the line "had to see that coming" applied to many elements of the episode, but said "there's a lot of fun to be had" and praised the use of the character James, dealing with the character's "self-loathing" well while acknowledging his status as the series' pre-Ghost Rider Ghost Rider. Fitzpatrick added that he was "still not crazy about whatever's going on with "Lucy" and her terrible ghost effects", and felt the Aida story was being pushed aside in favor of a seemingly corporate-mandated Ghost Rider focus. Terri Schwartz at IGN gave the episode a "great" 8.5 out of 10, praising the executive producers for their timing in bringing the season's different groups of characters together in this episode. Schwartz praised the car chase, the handling of the relationship between Simmons and Fitz in regards to his keeping Aida a secret from her, and the use of James, taking advantage of the audience's familiarity of him from the previous season.

At Den of Geek, Marc Buxton scored the episode 3.5 stars out of 5, praising the episode for balancing all of its different plot lines. He appreciated the time spent with Johnson and Simmons, and called the car chase "an absolute blast". He felt the newly introduced origin for Ghost Rider was diluting the "elegance" of the source material, while Aida's storyline was "more effective" (though he said it "seems so redundant when compared to the utter perfect exploration of the same subject on Westworld). Collider's Evan Valentine gave the episode a "very good" 4 stars out of 5, calling it "wall-to-wall fun" and praising the car chase as "probably one of the highlights of the season so far for me", and calling the Ghost Rider vs. Hellfire fight "a blast to watch". Valentine also praised the episode's handling of Aida, and its balancing of the different stories and characters.
