= Meet the New Boss (Agents of S.H.I.E.L.D.) =

- Agents of S.H.I.E.L.D. episode
- Episode no.: Season 4 Episode 2
- Directed by: Vincent Misiano
- Written by: Drew Z. Greenberg
- Cinematography by: Allan Westbrook
- Editing by: Joshua Charson
- Original air date: September 27, 2016
- Running time: 43 minutes

Guest appearances
- Gabriel Luna as Robbie Reyes / Ghost Rider; Lilli Birdsell as Lucy; Dan Donohue as Frederick; Ward Roberts as Hugo; Usman Ally as Vincent; Daniel Zacapa as Canelo; Jason O'Mara as Jeffrey Mace

Episode chronology
← Previous "The Ghost"	Next → "Uprising"
- Agents of S.H.I.E.L.D. season 4

"Meet the New Boss" is the second episode of the fourth season of the American television series Agents of S.H.I.E.L.D. Based on the Marvel Comics organization S.H.I.E.L.D., it follows Phil Coulson and his team of S.H.I.E.L.D. agents as they deal with the enhanced individuals Quake and Ghost Rider. It is set in the Marvel Cinematic Universe (MCU) and acknowledges the franchise's films. The episode was written by Drew Z. Greenberg, and directed by Vincent Misiano.

Clark Gregg reprises his role as Coulson from the film series, and is joined by series regulars Ming-Na Wen, Chloe Bennet as Quake, Iain De Caestecker, Elizabeth Henstridge, and Henry Simmons. The episode introduces the titular new director of S.H.I.E.L.D., portrayed by recurring guest star Jason O'Mara, after a new director was first teased in the third-season finale. The character is revealed to be Jeffrey Mace, and was made an Inhuman for the series in response to the events of the film Captain America: Civil War. The episode also explores more mystical elements introduced at the end of the previous episode. It is part of the first "pod" of eight episodes for the season, subtitled Ghost Rider.

"Meet the New Boss" originally aired on ABC on September 27, 2016, and was watched by 5.39 million viewers within a week of its release. The introduction of Mace was praised by critics, particularly for O'Mara's more subdued performance than many suspected for such a role. The episode was also praised for continuing the development begun in the previous episode, but received criticism for its antagonists and the effects used to make them appear "ghostly".

== Plot ==
A "ghostly" woman, recently escaped from a mysterious box and having apparently infected S.H.I.E.L.D. agent Melinda May in the process, returns to her previous home where she terrifies its new occupants. Robbie Reyes is followed by Daisy Johnson, the vigilante Quake, to the mechanic where he works after she confronted him the previous night about his actions as the Ghost Rider. Johnson believes Reyes when he says that he, as the Ghost Rider, only murders people who "deserve it", and now wants him to kill her. He refuses until he finds something that proves she deserves it, despite her thinking she already does.

S.H.I.E.L.D. picks up on the ghost's actions, with agents Leo Fitz and Jemma Simmons attempting to come up with a scientific explanation for her condition. They discover a research laboratory, Momentum Energy, that is near the woman's house and has been abandoned since an explosion seemingly killed its staff. Searching Johnson's belongings, Reyes also finds reference to Momentum in research she had been doing on him. At the facility, the ghost opens several boxes there similar to the one she was kept in, releasing ghosts of her former co-workers. They plan to reverse their condition using a book they had been studying, the Darkhold. Fitz and agent Alphonso "Mack" Mackenzie arrive to see the ghosts attempting to destroy the facility, but are saved when Johnson and Reyes arrive and the Ghost Rider disintegrates one of the ghosts while the others flee.

At S.H.I.E.L.D. base, the infected May starts seeing ghoulish images around her and begins attacking her fellow agents. She is subdued by the agency's new director, Jeffrey Mace, a super-strong Inhuman who has her sent to a secret facility for treatment. He refuses to give this location to Phil Coulson, the former director who had stepped down with the hope that a new, powered director could help calm human-Inhuman relations. With Mace planning to announce S.H.I.E.L.D. to the world as a legitimate agency, he has had Coulson helping him with public relations. Mack asks Johnson to return to S.H.I.E.L.D. with them, as she was an agent and friend of theirs before leaving to become Quake. She refuses, and instead joins with Reyes in a partnership—he believes Momentum and the ghosts are connected to him.

== Production ==
=== Development ===
A flash-forward at the end of the third-season finale revealed that Phil Coulson would no longer be the director of S.H.I.E.L.D. in the fourth season. The showrunners intentionally avoided giving hints as to who the new director would be in the sequence. Speculation in the media over the following months focused on which previously introduced character could be taking on the role. In September 2016, Marvel announced that the character would be revealed in the fifth season's second episode, "Meet the New Boss". The episode was written by Drew Z. Greenberg, with Vincent Misiano directing, and is part of the first "pod" of eight episodes for the season, subtitled Ghost Rider.

=== Casting and writing ===
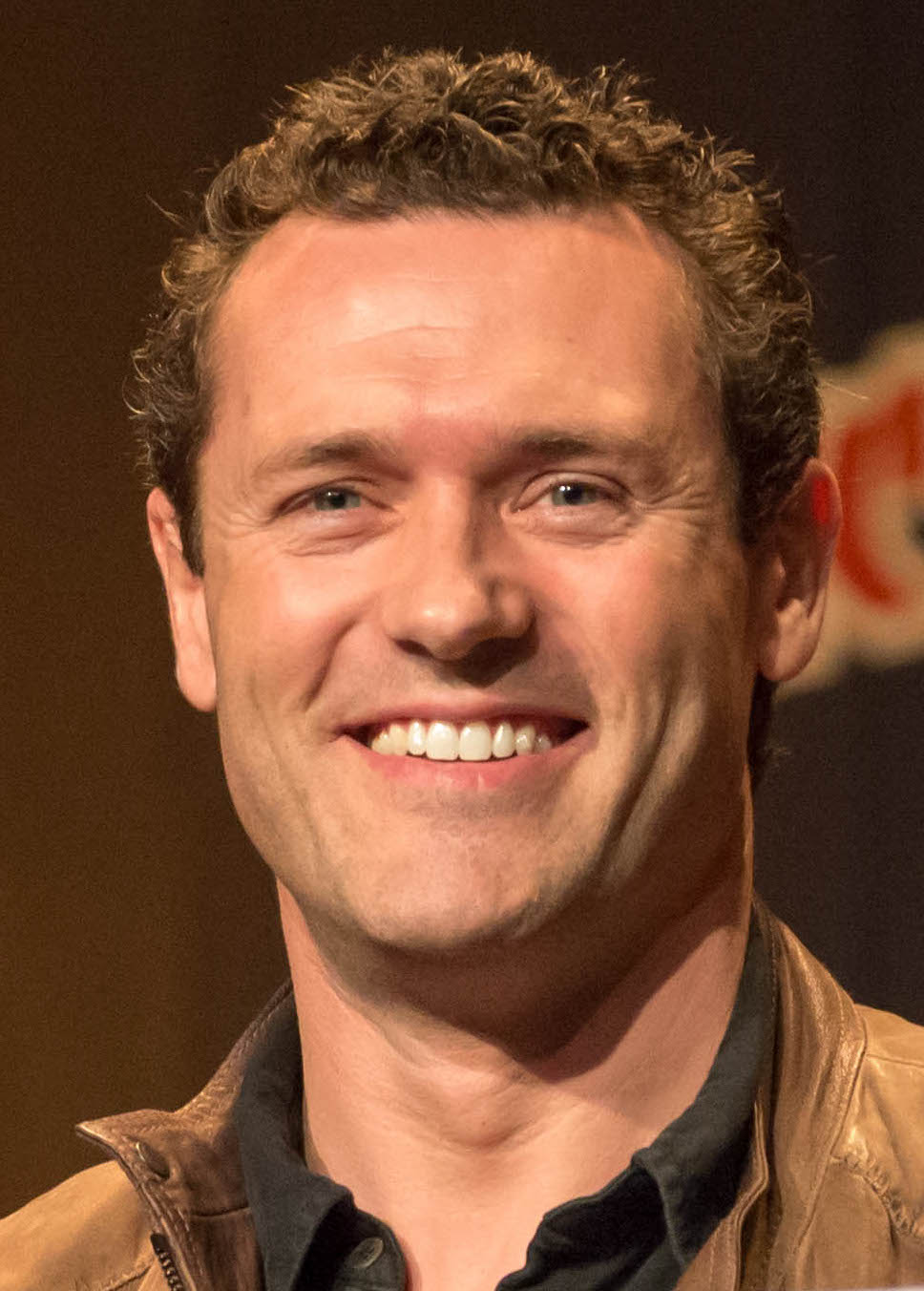
The episode introduces Jason O'Mara as the new Director of S.H.I.E.L.D., Jeffrey Mace.

In August 2016, the new director of S.H.I.E.L.D. was explained to be a new character to the series, portrayed by Jason O'Mara. The character was described as having "Marvel roots [that] go back to the 1940s". The new director was always going to be new to the series, as the executive producers felt that replacing Coulson with someone he knows "wouldn't [provide] as much tension to mine from". With the airing of the episode, the character was revealed to be an Inhuman with super strength called Jeffrey. Closed captions for the episode gave his last name as Mace, and a week later the executive producers confirmed the character to be Jeffrey Mace, who goes by Patriot in the comics.

In September 2016, Marvel confirmed that main cast members Clark Gregg as Phil Coulson, Ming-Na Wen as Melinda May, Chloe Bennet as Daisy Johnson / Quake, Iain De Caestecker as Leo Fitz, Elizabeth Henstridge as Jemma Simmons, and Henry Simmons as Alphonso "Mack" Mackenzie would be starring in the episode. In addition to O'Mara, guest stars for the episode include Gabriel Luna as Robbie Reyes, Briana Venskus as Agent Piper, Nico David as boy, John Churchill as father, Adrian Quinonez as Ignacio, Jen Kuo Sung as Chen, Daniel Zacapa as Canelo, Lilli Birdsell as Lucy, Dan Donohue as Frederick, Ward Roberts as Hugo, Usman Ally as Vincent, Deren Tadlock as armed S.H.I.E.L.D. guard and Mark Daneri as Wisconsin congressman. Luna, Venskus, Sung, and Birdsell reprise their roles from earlier in the series.

In the comics, Mace is "a former reporter who was inspired by Captain America to become a superhero, despite his own lack of powers". The character was made an Inhuman for the series because Coulson suggested that he be replaced with "a powered person the public could trust" following the events of Captain America: Civil War (2016). This followed the series' pattern of taking characters from the comics and putting "a twist" on them for television. O'Mara noted that the character was mandated by the President to clean up S.H.I.E.L.D. and make it more like the FBI or NSA, so he appears in the episode "eager to please" the United States government which O'Mara felt created some "goofy" scenes to contrast those where he has to withhold information from Coulson.

Discussing May's sickness in the episode after being "infected" by the ghost Lucy in the season premiere, Wen explained that "It starts to affect May's perception of things. It's almost like being on LSD, but worse. It's not good. You never want May out of control. You don't want her to be paranoid." Regarding Reyes' choice to work with Johnson at the end of the episode, Luna said that "a lot of that is I respect her power and I respect her. I understand that she's going in the same direction I am, she's seeking the same ends that I am, so I offer the opportunity for her to jump in and saddle up and we go find these things out."

== Release ==
"Meet the New Boss" was first aired in the United States on ABC on September 27, 2016. It began streaming on Netflix, along with the rest of the fourth season, on June 15, 2017.

== Reception ==
=== Ratings ===
In the United States the episode received a 0.9/3 percent share among adults between the ages of 18 and 49, meaning that it was seen by 0.9 percent of all households, and 3 percent of all of those watching television at the time of the broadcast. It was watched by 2.95 million viewers. Within a week of its release, "Meet the New Boss" had been watched by 5.39 million U.S. viewers, above the season average of 4.22 million.

=== Critical response ===
Writing for The A.V. Club, Alex McLevy graded the episode a "B" and praised Greenberg's script for its "wit and verve" and "sparkling" dialogue. He felt Johnson and her storyline with Reyes benefited the most from the script, and said that the further development of the central team and their newly established status quo covered the "real questions" of the episode despite the various overarching plot developments shown. McLevy felt the introduction of Mace and the surprise twist of his Inhumanity were handled fine, but was even more pleased with the twist of "having the director being a really personable, self-deprecating dork" and O'Mara's performance as such. Joseph McCabe at Nerdist praised O'Mara for "keeping his gravitas a safe distance below the surface", which McCabe found to be a breath of fresh air from previous big introductions to the series.

At Den of Geek, Marc Buxton gave the episode 4 stars out of 5 and praised the series for exploring supernatural elements from Marvel Comics, which he found to be a welcome change from the series' usual Inhuman and Hydra based stories. Buxton appreciated the introduction of Mace as both a reference to the comics and a tie-in to Captain America: Civil War, and found the deterioration of May to be particularly meaningful due to the drastic change from her usual stoic personality. For Collider, Evan Valentine thought the episode continued the world building started in "The Ghost" in a more compelling way, and gave the episode a "very good" 4 stars out of 5. He called the introduction of Mace "one of the stronger parts of this episode" and praised his non-cliche characterization, the Inhuman twist, and O'Mara's performance, positively comparing him to Bill Paxton (who had a recurring role in the series' first season). Valentine also positively compared the authenticity of Reyes' life and work environment to the world building of Marvel's Netflix television series.

Terri Schwartz of IGN scored the episode a "great" 8.2 out of 10, praising the continued Ghost Rider storyline and willingness of the executive producers to pay for the expensive effects required to realize that character on screen. However, Schwartz was less positive about the effects used for the antagonistic "ghosts", calling them "lacking", and feeling that those characters ultimately did not live up to the horror film tone of the episode's cold open. ScreenCrush's Kevin Fitzpatrick was also negative of the ghosts, calling the cold open "straight out of bad Supernatural" and saying the design of the ghosts "definitely needed work". Fitzpatrick also discussed the ongoing Ghost Rider and LMD storylines, concluding that "I'm still waiting for Agents of S.H.I.E.L.D. to get a better handle on its new direction".
