= Deals with Our Devils =

- Agents of S.H.I.E.L.D. episode
- Episode no.: Season 4 Episode 7
- Directed by: Jesse Bochco
- Written by: DJ Doyle
- Cinematography by: Feliks Parnell
- Editing by: Eric Litman
- Original air date: November 29, 2016

Guest appearances
- Gabriel Luna as Robbie Reyes / Ghost Rider; José Zúñiga as Eli Morrow; Mallory Jansen as Aida; Lorenzo James Henrie as Gabe Reyes; Arnell Powell as a scientist; Manish Dayal as Vijay Nadeer; Jason O'Mara as Jeffrey Mace

Episode chronology
| ← Previous "The Good Samaritan" | Next → "The Laws of Inferno Dynamics" |
- Agents of S.H.I.E.L.D. season 4

"Deals with Our Devils" is the seventh episode of the fourth season of the American television series Agents of S.H.I.E.L.D. Based on the Marvel Comics organization S.H.I.E.L.D., it follows Phil Coulson and his allies, who are trapped between dimensions. It is set in the Marvel Cinematic Universe (MCU) and acknowledges the franchise's films. The episode was written by DJ Doyle, and directed by Jesse Bochco.

Clark Gregg reprises his role as Coulson from the film series, and is joined by series regulars Ming-Na Wen, Chloe Bennet, Iain De Caestecker, Elizabeth Henstridge, Henry Simmons, and John Hannah.

"Deals with Our Devils" originally aired on ABC on November 29, 2016, and according to Nielsen Media Research, was watched by 4.63 million viewers within a week of its release. The episode was nominated for Best Sound Editing – Short Form Dialogue and ADR in Television at the 64th Golden Reel Awards.

== Plot ==
Phil Coulson, Leo Fitz and Robbie Reyes are trapped out of sync with reality, unable to interact with the real world, with no-one else able to see, hear or touch them. They are being drawn to another dimension, which Robbie describes as Hell, revealing that the Ghost Rider spirit has been there before. Killing several agents using his new powers, Eli Morrow escapes, while the Ghost Rider spirit, unwilling to return to "Hell", abandons Robbie and instead possesses Alphonso "Mack" Mackenzie, just as he learns Morrow was allied with the Chinese Watchdogs, having recruited them to retrieve the ghost scientists and find the Darkhold. Mack hunts down the remaining Chinese gang members, and Daisy Johnson pursues him, unknowingly accompanied by Robbie, who convinces the spirit to return to him and help him exact revenge on Morrow, in exchange for Robbie continuing to serve as the spirit's host afterwards.

Melinda May decides to use the Darkhold to rescue Coulson, Fitz and Robbie, and enlists Holden Radcliffe to read the Darkhold, but he finds the contents are too overwhelming for the human brain to perceive. Aida suggests she reads it instead, revealing her android nature to May (and Coulson), and with the magical knowledge she learns from the book, she builds a machine that opens a dimensional portal, through which Coulson, Fitz and Robbie return.

Meanwhile, Jemma Simmons frees Vijay Nadeer from his Terrigen cocoon by touching it, at which point Ellen Nadeer immediately has her removed. Upon returning to the Playground she reunites with Fitz, who learned of the deal Jeffrey Mace made with Nadeer while out of sync. In an end tag, Aida secretly begins experimenting with her new knowledge from the Darkhold, creating an artificial brain.

== Production ==
=== Development ===
In November 2016, Marvel revealed that the seventh episode of the season would be titled "Deals with Our Devils", to be written by DJ Doyle, with Jesse Bochco directing.

=== Casting ===
Main cast members Clark Gregg as Phil Coulson, Ming-Na Wen as Melinda May, Chloe Bennet as Daisy Johnson / Quake, Iain De Caestecker as Leo Fitz, Elizabeth Henstridge as Jemma Simmons, Henry Simmons as Alphonso "Mack" Mackenzie, and John Hannah as Holden Radcliffe were confirmed to be starring in the episode.

Also revealed was the guest cast for the episode, including Jason O'Mara as Director Jeffrey Mace, Gabriel Luna as Robbie Reyes, Mallory Jansen as Aida, Manish Dayal as Vijay Nadeer, Alexander Wraith as Agent Anderson, Lorenzo James Henrie as Gabe Reyes, Maximilian Osinski as Agent Davis, Patrick Cavanaugh as Burrows, José Zúñiga as Eli Morrow, Blaise Miller as Agent Nathanson, Arnell Powell as scientist, Lance Broadway as Tac Team Leader and David An as Zhi. O'Mara, Luna, Jansen, Wraith, Henrie, Osinski, Cavanaugh, Zúñiga, and Miller reprise their roles from earlier in the series.

== Release ==
"Deals with Our Devils" was first aired in the United States on ABC on November 29, 2016. It began streaming on Netflix, along with the rest of the fourth season, on June 15, 2017.

== Reception ==
=== Ratings ===
In the United States the episode received a 0.8/3 percent share among adults between the ages of 18 and 49, meaning that it was seen by 0.8 percent of all households, and 3 percent of all of those watching television at the time of the broadcast. It was watched by 2.41 million viewers. Within a week of its release, "Deals with Our Devils" had been watched by 4.63 million U.S. viewers, above the season average of 4.22 million.

=== Accolades ===
The episode was nominated for Best Sound Editing – Short Form Dialogue and ADR in Television at the 64th Golden Reel Awards but lost to the Penny Dreadful episode "Ebb Tide".
