= Agents of S.H.I.E.L.D. season 4 =

Agents of S.H.I.E.L.D.
- Season 4
- Promotional poster for the season's first "pod", Ghost Rider, and home media cover art
- Showrunners: Jed Whedon; Maurissa Tancharoen; Jeffrey Bell
- Starring: Clark Gregg; Ming-Na Wen; Chloe Bennet; Iain De Caestecker; Elizabeth Henstridge; Henry Simmons; John Hannah
- No. of episodes: 22

Release
- Original network: ABC
- Original release: September 20, 2016 – May 16, 2017

Season chronology
- ← Previous; Season 3 Next → Season 5

The fourth season of the American television series Agents of S.H.I.E.L.D., based on the Marvel Comics spy organization S.H.I.E.L.D., follows Phil Coulson and other S.H.I.E.L.D. agents and allies after the signing of the Sokovia Accords. It is set in the Marvel Cinematic Universe (MCU) and acknowledges the continuity of the franchise's films. The season was produced by ABC Studios, Marvel Television, and Mutant Enemy Productions, with Jed Whedon, Maurissa Tancharoen, and Jeffrey Bell serving as showrunners.

Clark Gregg reprises his role as Coulson from the film series, starring alongside the returning series regulars Ming-Na Wen, Chloe Bennet, Iain De Caestecker, Elizabeth Henstridge, and Henry Simmons. They are joined by John Hannah who was promoted from his recurring guest role in the third season. The fourth season was ordered in March 2016, with production taking place from that July until the following April. Due to its broadcast schedule, the season was split into three "pods": Ghost Rider for the first eight episodes, featuring recurring guest star Gabriel Luna as the supernatural Robbie Reyes / Ghost Rider and exploring mysticism in the MCU alongside the film Doctor Strange (2016); LMD, referring to the new Life Model Decoy program, for the next seven episodes which focus on recurring guest star Mallory Jansen as the LMD Aida; and Agents of Hydra for the final seven episodes, partly set in a "what if" virtual reality that allowed the return of former series regular Brett Dalton as Grant Ward. The season is also affected by the events of the film Captain America: Civil War (2016), and continues storylines established in the canceled series Agent Carter.

The first episode premiered at a screening on September 19, 2016, with the season then airing for 22 episodes on ABC, from September 20, 2016, until May 16, 2017. The premiere debuted to 3.58 million viewers, down from previous season premieres but average for the series. Critical response to the season was positive, with many feeling that each pod was better than the last and in particular praising the visual effects and tone of Ghost Rider, the writing and acting of LMD, and the character development and political commentary explored during Agents of Hydra. The season saw series low viewership, but was still considered to have solved ABC's problem during its new Tuesday night timeslot, and the series was renewed for a fifth season in May 2017.

== Episodes ==
No. overall	No. in season	Title	Directed by	Written by	Original release date	U.S. viewers (millions)
Ghost Rider
67	1	"The Ghost"	Billy Gierhart	Jed Whedon & Maurissa Tancharoen	September 20, 2016	3.44
Six months after the final battle with Hive, former S.H.I.E.L.D. agent Daisy Johnson, now the vigilante "Quake", is hunting gang affiliates of the terrorist group the Watchdogs in Los Angeles when Aryan Brotherhood members are murdered by the fiery "Ghost Rider". Agents Phil Coulson and Alphonso Mackenzie, who were forbidden from searching for Daisy by new S.H.I.E.L.D. Director Jeffrey Mace, are tipped off to her location by Agent Melinda May. Agent Leo Fitz discovers that S.H.I.E.L.D. ally Holden Radcliffe has created the android Aida and agrees to help perfect her. He keeps this from his girlfriend Agent Jemma Simmons, who is in the Director's inner circle. Simmons discovers that Coulson and Mack are investigating Daisy and orders May to stop them. The latter arrives to find them surveilling Chinese gangsters who bought a weapon off the Brotherhood: a mystical figure that turns the gang members berserk and secretly infects May, as well. Daisy tracks down the Ghost Rider, but it defeats her. She later sees its human form, mechanic Robbie Reyes, looking after his disabled brother Gabe.
68	2	"Meet the New Boss"	Vincent Misiano	Drew Z. Greenberg	September 27, 2016	2.95
S.H.I.E.L.D. and Daisy independently investigate the figure, an apparent ghost of a woman named Lucy Bauer, both concluding that she worked at an abandoned facility, Momentum Energy. Daisy confronts Reyes again and he once more overpowers her. Restraining her, Reyes searches Daisy's belongings and discovers her research on Momentum. He leaves and Daisy escapes her restraints. As Mace plans to officially announce S.H.I.E.L.D. as a legitimate organization again, the infected May grows increasingly paranoid, seeing all people as monsters and eventually attacking other agents. Mace restrains May with his Inhuman strength and promises to take care of her. Mack and Fitz arrive at Momentum to find more ghosts, who attempt to blow it up with them inside. Ghost Rider intervenes, destroying one of the ghosts, and Daisy arrives to stop S.H.I.E.L.D. from apprehending him. Rather than rejoin S.H.I.E.L.D., Daisy agrees to work with Reyes, believing that the actions of both the ghosts and the Watchdogs may be tied to him.
69	3	"Uprising"	Magnus Martens	Craig Titley	October 11, 2016	2.68
Inhuman S.H.I.E.L.D. asset Elena Rodriguez is caught in a blackout in Miami. Reyes and Daisy are caught in another in Los Angeles. A group claiming to be the Inhuman resistance, fighting registration after the Sokovia Accords, takes responsibility. Reyes explains that his uncle, Eli Morrow, was imprisoned for causing an explosion at Momentum that apparently created the ghosts; he believes that atoning for Morrow's sins will pay his debt to the Devil and rid Reyes of the Ghost Rider. At the Reyes' house, Gabe realizes that Daisy is Quake and asks her to leave Robbie alone. Radcliffe and Simmons "cure" May by killing and reviving her. Coulson, Mack, and Fitz save Rodriguez from a group of Watchdogs and find the EMP that caused the blackout—it was set off by the Watchdogs, who had access to S.H.I.E.L.D.'s list of registered Inhumans and have backing from Senator Ellen Nadeer, whose brother Vijay Nadeer is encased in an Inhuman terrigen cocoon. Hoping to assuage public fears of the Inhumans, Mace announces the return of S.H.I.E.L.D.
70	4	"Let Me Stand Next to Your Fire"	Brad Turner	Matt Owens	October 18, 2016	2.34
Daisy coerces Simmons to help track the Watchdogs' actions, discovering that the group hacked the Inhuman list using an Inhuman's monitoring device. Coulson visits Morrow in prison, but gets no answers. Reyes arrives to talk to Morrow and Mack recognizes him as the Ghost Rider; they capture Reyes and earn his trust. He visits Morrow and learns that the Momentum explosion was caused by a group of scientists studying the Darkhold, a mysterious book. Only Lucy's husband Joseph, whom Morrow put in a coma while trying to stop the experiments, survived. Daisy and Simmons find the next Inhuman on the list, J. T. James, and destroy his monitor, but he betrays them—he hates being an Inhuman and is aiding the Watchdogs. Coulson and Mack, alerted by the monitor's destruction, arrive to save Daisy and Simmons. The Ghost Rider defeats James. They then get May to help find the Darkhold. Aida supervises May's recovery as a Turing test by Radcliffe, but Simmons deduces her true nature while being set to take a lie-detection test for Mace.
71	5	"Lockup"	Kate Woods	Nora Zuckerman & Lilla Zuckerman	October 25, 2016	2.30
Lucy uses her ghostly state to wake Joseph and ask where he hid the Darkhold. Coulson arrives and is able to learn of this before Joseph dies from her "infection". Coulson decides to use Morrow against Lucy, but doesn't tell Mace. The latter, whose public approval was already high after heroics during a bombing in Vienna, (Note: During the events of Captain America: Civil War.) becomes more popular after he reveals his Inhuman status in a television debate with Nadeer. However, Simmons threatens to reveal the truth about his Vienna actions and he agrees to exempt her from any lie-detection tests. At the prison, Lucy infects the staff, who attack Coulson and May. Daisy saves them while Mack and Reyes break out Morrow. Reyes confronts the last member of the "Fifth Street Locos" gang who paralyzed Gabe in a paid hit. Reyes loses control and the Ghost Rider kills the prisoner. This allows Lucy to kidnap Morrow, whose help she needs. Mace secretly meets with Nadeer and agrees to help her when she blackmails him with footage of the Ghost Rider's actions while working with S.H.I.E.L.D.
72	6	"The Good Samaritan"	Billy Gierhart	Jeffrey Bell	November 1, 2016	2.43
Mace sends Simmons on a secret assignment, then takes a team aboard Coulson's plane to arrest Reyes and Daisy. The pair hide with a newly picked up Gabe, where Robbie explains that he and Gabe snuck out to race in Morrow's car, but were attacked by the Locos. Gabe was paralyzed and Robbie was killed. Robbie promised an unknown voice that he would seek vengeance if given a second chance and was resurrected when the spirit of the Ghost Rider was passed to him by a stranger. (Note: Luna believed this was meant to be the Johnny Blaze version of the Ghost Rider character and that unspecified legal issues prevented this from being made explicit.) Mace finds the fugitives, but is overpowered by the Ghost Rider. He agrees to use Robbie against Lucy, and Fitz tracks her to an abandoned Roxxon power plant. May takes and hides the Darkhold while Robbie destroys Lucy after the latter reveals that Morrow craves the Darkhold's power himself—his own experiments created the ghosts and Joseph ordered the hit on Morrow's car to stop him. Morrow then uses an improved version of the Momentum machine to gain the ability to create matter. Robbie, Fitz, and Coulson disappear.
73	7	"Deals with Our Devils"	Jesse Bochco	DJ Doyle	November 29, 2016	2.41
Coulson, Fitz, and Reyes get trapped between dimensions and helplessly watch as Morrow kills several agents before escaping. Fitz overhears Mace arguing with Nadeer; he needs Simmons to understand Morrow's technology, but she has been taken to Nadeer's brother, Vijay, who she helps break out of his terrigen cocoon. In Simmons' absence, Radcliffe studies the technology and is presented with the Darkhold by May in her desperation to save Coulson. Radcliffe believes the book contains too much knowledge for a person to process, but Aida is able to read it, revealing her android nature to Coulson and May. Aida constructs a portal through which Coulson and Fitz return. During this time, the Ghost Rider spirit had left Reyes and possessed Mack to avoid the other dimension, where it had been before. Reyes confronts the spirit, promising to serve it even after they defeat Morrow if it leaves Mack. It agrees and Reyes returns with it through the portal. Secretly, Aida begins experimenting with her new knowledge from the Darkhold, creating an artificial brain.
74	8	"The Laws of Inferno Dynamics"	Kevin Tancharoen	Paul Zbyszewski	December 6, 2016	2.37
Coulson tells Mace that Aida is an android and he agrees to use her in the fight against Morrow. He also approves a strike team consisting of Rodriguez, Reyes, and Daisy, as long as the latter two keep a low profile. The team attempts to enter an abandoned building in which Morrow has barricaded himself via his growing abilities but, at first, only Reyes can make it through Morrow's initial trap. By viewing Reyes' body-cam, Fitz deduces that Morrow is drawing his power from the other dimension and has created a demon core that could destroy half the city, if activated. Aida creates a new dimensional portal beneath the demon core through which the device and Morrow are dragged. Reyes also falls through the portal after using the Ghost Rider to hold Morrow in place. Daisy is seen by local media and Mace publicly clears her name, reinstating her as an agent of S.H.I.E.L.D. He then allows Radcliffe to continuing working on his Life Model Decoy (LMD) program after his success with Aida, who has secretly replaced May with an LMD.
LMD
75	9	"Broken Promises"	Garry A. Brown	Brent Fletcher	January 10, 2017	2.72
Fitz and Radcliffe are sent to clear Aida's memory of the Darkhold, but she reveals her new-found sentience and overpowers them. Taking control of S.H.I.E.L.D.'s systems, Aida finds the Darkhold after Coulson gives its location to the May LMD (which doesn't know it isn't the real May). Fitz is able to take control of the systems before Aida escapes and Mack beheads her. Radcliffe later laments about this to a new model of Aida, as he had programmed the original's apparent sentience in an attempt to steal the Darkhold for himself. Senator Nadeer orders a group of Watchdogs to kill a now-recovered Vijay, but he convinces her to spare him, as his long terrigenesis appears not to have affected him. Simmons, having identified Vijay from photographs, arrives with Mace and Daisy as Vijay discovers he now has super-reflexes. Ellen convinces him to leave with her, but then shoots him in the stomach. Ellen asks the Watchdogs for reinforcements from "The Superior", as Vijay's body is dropped into a lake and enveloped by another terrigenesis cocoon.
76	10	"The Patriot"	Kevin Tancharoen	James C. Oliver & Sharla Oliver	January 17, 2017	2.03
Mace holds a press conference for Daisy, celebrating her "undercover" actions, until a sniper attempts to assassinate him. Coulson and Mack escort Mace and PR agent Burrows—who is often seen near Mace with a mysterious briefcase—to a quinjet, but it explodes mid-flight. Burrows is flung from the plane with the briefcase and the others crash land in a forest. There, they find ex-Hydra agents, hired by the Watchdogs, who have recovered Burrows' body. In the ensuing fight, Mace tries to get a serum from the briefcase, but it is destroyed and he is injured. Mace explains that he is not an Inhuman and that he was given his abilities by a super-serum from the government to create a trustworthy, enhanced leader of S.H.I.E.L.D. After their rescue by Daisy and the May LMD, Coulson tells Mace to continue as "the Patriot", the face and political leader of S.H.I.E.L.D, while Coulson takes back command of operations. The May LMD discovers her robotic skeleton from a wound and Fitz secretly begins studying Aida's severed head.
77	11	"Wake Up"	Jesse Bochco	Drew Z. Greenberg	January 24, 2017	2.00
Daisy and Mace attend a Senate hearing to ratify the former's signing of the Sokovia Accords, with Senator Nadeer questioning Daisy's undercover actions. Coulson and Rodriguez infiltrate Nadeer's office to install surveillance devices, but are caught, giving Nadeer an excuse to start a full investigation of S.H.I.E.L.D. The May LMD realizes that she subconsciously leaked the details of Coulson's plan and confronts Radcliffe, as Fitz discovers Radcliffe's treachery from the original Aida's programming. Just before S.H.I.E.L.D. arrives to arrest him, Radcliffe explains to the LMD that her programming will not allow her to reveal her nature to anyone else. Fitz later confronts Radcliffe in his cell and deduces that he is also an LMD—the real Radcliffe sought protection from Nadeer after Aida's initial failure. He and Aida have May captive with them, her mind in a virtual reality simulation of a tragic past event. Meanwhile, Mack and Rodriguez have grown close and he tells her of his daughter Hope from a past marriage who died as an infant.
78	12	"Hot Potato Soup"	Nina Lopez-Corrado	Craig Titley	January 31, 2017	2.15
Agent Billy Koenig, whom Coulson entrusted with the Darkhold, is abducted by the Watchdogs. Nadeer directs Radcliffe to the Superior, reclusive industrialist Anton Ivanov, and Radcliffe scans Koenig's brain to learn that the Darkhold was hidden in the Labyrinth, a S.H.I.E.L.D. facility known only to the Koenig family. Coulson secures the rest of the Koenig family, who take him, the May LMD, and Daisy to get the book. The Radcliffe LMD reveals that Radcliffe knows Fitz's estranged father and has created another LMD. Simmons remembers that Radcliffe scanned May's brain when they were curing her of Lucy's influence and warns Daisy of the May LMD in time to stop it from taking the Darkhold and killing Coulson. The Watchdogs arrive with Billy and Radcliffe steals the Darkhold in the ensuing fight. S.H.I.E.L.D. later destroys the remains of the first Aida and the Radcliffe LMD. Ivanov explains to Radcliffe that he plans to use the Darkhold to destroy both the Inhumans and the man who appears to be behind the recent alien crises — Coulson.
79	13	"BOOM"	Billy Gierhart	Nora Zuckerman & Lilla Zuckerman	February 7, 2017	2.08
Coulson and Mack locate Agnes Kitsworth, Radcliffe's former lover and partner. Radcliffe left Kitsworth after she was diagnosed with terminal cancer and modeled Aida after her. Coulson convinces Kitsworth to meet with Radcliffe. In case Nadeer is an Inhuman like her brother, Ivanov sends Watchdog Tucker Shockley to expose her to terrigen (provided by Radcliffe), but the substance transforms him instead. Shockley explodes, killing Nadeer, but then his molecules reassemble. Ivanov agrees to use Shockley's new ability against S.H.I.E.L.D. Radcliffe meets with Kitsworth and convinces her he can save her life if she escapes with him before S.H.I.E.L.D. captures them. Daisy confronts Shockley and distracts him long enough for Fitz and Simmons to contain him in a specially-made device. Ivanov uses this as a distraction to attack and kidnap Mace, who has learned that, each time he uses his super-serum, there is a chance that it will kill him. As Kitsworth dies from her cancer, Radcliffe places her consciousness in the virtual "Framework" with May.
80	14	"The Man Behind the Shield"	Wendey Stanzler	Matt Owens	February 14, 2017	2.13
Years ago, Coulson and May recovered an unknown object from a Russian outpost, besting an SVR team that included Ivanov. For the failure, the SVR agents other than Ivanov were tortured and killed. Now, Ivanov sends S.H.I.E.L.D. on a treasure hunt around the world, including to that outpost, in their search for Mace. Ivanov has been torturing Mace, disgusted at his attempts to emulate the Inhumans. The team eventually finds Ivanov and Daisy overpowers him. Coulson and Mack save a near-death Mace while Fitz and Simmons attempt to locate any sign of the Framework in hopes of finding May. Unsuccessful, the pair reunite with the others and they return to base. Aida, whom Radcliffe has left to carry out his plans while he spends time in the Framework, finds a crippled Ivanov. At base, Fitz and Simmons are alerted by their LMD security system, learning that four agents were replaced with LMDs by Aida while Fitz and Simmons were separated from the group. This includes Coulson, as the Coulson LMD wakes the May LMD from storage.
81	15	"Self Control"	Jed Whedon	Jed Whedon	February 21, 2017	2.01
The new LMDs are aware of their nature and plan to carry out Ivanov's goal of destroying all Inhumans. Simmons discovers that Mace, Mack, and Fitz are the other new LMDs and overpowers Fitz. Daisy also discovers them and plans, with Simmons, to hack into the Framework remotely to find the others from the inside. Aida kills Radcliffe's body, but lets his consciousness live in the Framework. Daisy overpowers the Mace, Mack, and Coulson LMDs, but they find the May LMD waiting for them at the base entrance, tasked with detonating a large explosive to prevent their escape. The May LMD instead lets them leave and destroys the base with the LMDs inside. In the Framework, the agents find an altered reality: Daisy is in a relationship with an alive Grant Ward; Coulson is teaching about Inhumans; Hope is alive with Mack; Fitz is rich; Simmons is dead; and May works for Hydra, which has replaced S.H.I.E.L.D. In the real world, Aida is able to sever Ivanov's living head from his crippled body and builds android bodies for his mind to control.
Agents of Hydra
82	16	"What If..."	Oz Scott	DJ Doyle	April 4, 2017	2.15
In the Framework, Daisy discovers that she and Ward are agents of Hydra, working under May and Fitz. The tragic event from May's past has no longer happened; in the real world, she killed Katya Belyakov, a young Inhuman girl but, in the Framework, she brought the girl back to the United States as a refugee who then became a mass murderer and the catalyst for Hydra to take power. Simmons awakens in a mass grave of S.H.I.E.L.D. agents and eventually comes across Coulson, who is teaching a Hydra-approved curriculum that warns against the dangers of Inhumans. Simmons is unable to convince Coulson that he is inside a virtual simulation and he calls Hydra. Daisy races to find Simmons before the rest of Hydra and is followed by Ward, who reveals himself to be a mole inside Hydra for the Resistance. Daisy and Simmons try to exit the Framework using a safeguard the latter created, but it has been blocked by Aida, who has entered the Framework as the Director of Hydra and Fitz's lover. Daisy then goes to Coulson and he remembers her name.
83	17	"Identity and Change"	Garry A. Brown	George Kitson	April 11, 2017	2.32
Hoping Radcliffe can help them escape, Daisy returns to Hydra and locates him, but May gives her a new mission on the orders of Fitz and Aida, the latter choosing to go by Ophelia or Madame Hydra. Ward directs Coulson (who can remember some things, thanks to previous tampering with his mind) and Simmons to the Resistance, the remnants of S.H.I.E.L.D. under the command of an Inhuman Mace. Ward, Simmons, and Coulson take a stolen Hydra quinjet to extract Radcliffe. May and Daisy arrest Mack, and May forces him to trick Daisy into confessing her true allegiance. The others find Radcliffe living in seclusion with Kitsworth, but they cannot leave the Framework due to their real bodies having died. Fitz and Madame Hydra arrive and Radcliffe attempts to appeal to Fitz, though Fitz already knows of the "other world" and that Radcliffe enslaved Aida there. He kills Kitsworth and imprisons Radcliffe, torturing him and Daisy. Regretting his actions, Mack joins the Resistance.
84	18	"No Regrets"	Eric Laneuville	Paul Zbyszewski	April 18, 2017	2.43
Mace and Coulson infiltrate a Hydra "Enlightenment Camp" to free an undercover agent—Antoine Triplett, a S.H.I.E.L.D. agent who died in the real world. They are tracked there by May, who uses a super serum to fight Mace. Through the vents in their holding cells, Daisy learns from Radcliffe of a backdoor he installed to escape the Framework that Aida is unable to disable. Coulson attempts to save one of his former students who he sees being held in the camp; Mace follows him into a building to help. Hydra uses a missile to bring the building down and May enters the rubble to ensure Mace is dead. She finds him stopping debris from crushing the student, with Coulson and Triplett helping other children escape the building. May is horrified to find children being victimized by Hydra. With the others having escaped to safety, Mace is crushed beneath the debris and, in the real world, Aida finds his physical body dead, as well. Turning on Hydra, May sneaks a Terrigen crystal to Daisy so she can regain her Inhuman abilities within the Framework.
85	19	"All the Madame's Men"	Billy Gierhart	James C. Oliver & Sharla Oliver	April 25, 2017	2.15
May and Daisy escape Hydra, with Daisy using her abilities to break Ophelia's back. Ophelia insists that Fitz complete work on their secret project Looking Glass, after which her Framework body will no longer matter. May and Daisy join up with S.H.I.E.L.D., who are struggling to regroup after Mace's death. May provides them with body cam footage from the attack on the Enlightenment Center, which Coulson broadcasts to the world to counteract Hydra's propaganda. Meanwhile, Simmons and Triplett investigate a Russian oil platform which he believes is the location of Looking Glass from his time undercover; it is the Framework equivalent of Ivanov's oil platform in the real world, from which Aida is running the Framework. The pair find it empty and Simmons deduces that Looking Glass consists of a machine built on the real world platform, to be connected to a machine in the Framework using knowledge from the Darkhold, allowing Ophelia to go from the Framework to a true human body in the real world.
86	20	"Farewell, Cruel World!"	Vincent Misiano	Brent Fletcher	May 2, 2017	2.15
After Daisy and Simmons entered the Framework, their bodies were protected by Rodriguez and Agents Piper, Davis and Prince aboard the S.H.I.E.L.D. aircraft Zephyr One. With their connection to the Framework draining the plane's power, Piper chose to shut off its cloaking ability, revealing their location to Ivanov and his men. In the Framework, Simmons visits and accidentally kills Fitz's father Alistair; Fitz begins hunting her with help from Radcliffe, Fitz having offered to send Radcliffe through the machine, restoring his living body. Ophelia initiates her transference into her new body. Daisy takes the group to Radcliffe's exit point, where she, Coulson, and May cross back into the real world. Fitz arrives and confronts Simmons, but is overpowered by Radcliffe, who regrets all his actions since he first saw and wanted the Darkhold. Radcliffe sends Fitz through, followed by Simmons. Mack decides to stay, not wanting to live in a world without Hope. At Ivanov's platform, the newly human Ophelia confronts Coulson, May, and Fitz, teleporting away with the latter.
87	21	"The Return"	Kevin Tancharoen	Maurissa Tancharoen & Jed Whedon	May 9, 2017	2.14
The agents on Zephyr One fight off Ivanov's men and race to the platform to save Coulson and May from Ivanov's android bodies. Ivanov launches torpedoes at the platform that threaten Mack's body, but the latter is saved by Ophelia, convinced by Fitz to put to good use the Inhuman abilities his machine gave her new body. In isolation at S.H.I.E.L.D., Fitz and Ophelia discuss her newly discovered human emotions and the fact that he remembers all the terrible things he did inside the Framework. He admits that he ultimately still loves Simmons over her, outraging Ophelia. Glenn Talbot arrives at the ruined S.H.I.E.L.D. base, where Ophelia kills several of his soldiers and other S.H.I.E.L.D. agents, including Prince. Coulson and the others flee in the Zephyr once more, while Ophelia returns to Ivanov, who plans to use knowledge from the Darkhold to apply the changed reality of the Framework to the real world. Meanwhile, Rodriguez enters the Framework herself to try to convince Mack to leave and the Ghost Rider returns through a portal from the other dimension.
88	22	"World's End"	Billy Gierhart	Jeffrey Bell	May 16, 2017	2.08
Ivanov takes the Darkhold to an international meeting about S.H.I.E.L.D. and recent events. He proposes to use the book against the Inhumans, which is timed with an attack on the group by an LMD of Daisy, who shoots Talbot in the head, leaving him comatose. In the ensuing fight, S.H.I.E.L.D. is able to retrieve the Darkhold with Reyes' help. In the Framework, Rodriguez is unable to convince Mack to leave, but he returns with her after Hope's code is deleted as a result of Ophelia shutting down the Framework. Radcliffe is also deleted after accepting that immortality without Kitsworth is worthless. Ophelia comes for the Darkhold and Coulson surprises her by unleashing the Spirit of Vengeance himself, having made a deal to become the Ghost Rider for a short time. He incinerates Ophelia. Reyes, now the Ghost Rider again, takes the Darkhold through a portal. The S.H.I.E.L.D. agents then wait to be arrested by the government, but are instead taken by a mysterious group. Some time later, Coulson finds himself on a space station.

== Cast and characters ==
=== Main ===
- Clark Gregg as Phil Coulson
- Ming-Na Wen as Melinda May
- Chloe Bennet as Daisy Johnson / Quake
- Iain De Caestecker as Leo Fitz
- Elizabeth Henstridge as Jemma Simmons
- Henry Simmons as Alphonso "Mack" Mackenzie
- John Hannah as Holden Radcliffe

=== Recurring ===
- Gabriel Luna as Robbie Reyes / Ghost Rider
- Natalia Cordova-Buckley as Elena "Yo-Yo" Rodriguez
- Lorenzo James Henrie as Gabe Reyes
- Mallory Jansen as Aida / "Ophelia" / Madame Hydra
- Lilli Birdsell as Lucy Bauer
- Jason O'Mara as Jeffrey Mace / Patriot
- Parminder Nagra as Ellen Nadeer
- Patrick Cavanaugh as Burrows
- José Zúñiga as Eli Morrow
- Adrian Pasdar as Glenn Talbot
- Zach McGowan as Anton Ivanov / The Superior
- Brett Dalton as Grant Ward
- Jordan Rivera as Hope Mackenzie

=== Notable guests ===
- Axle Whitehead as J. T. James / Hellfire
- Patton Oswalt as Billy, Sam and Thurston Koenig
- B. J. Britt as Antoine Triplett
- Adam Kulbersh as Kenneth Turgeon
- Simon Kassianides as Sunil Bakshi

== Production ==
=== Development ===
Agents of S.H.I.E.L.D. was renewed for a fourth season on March 3, 2016, earlier than usual for the series. Executive producer Jed Whedon said on this, "We're thrilled to know going into the end of [season three] with certainty that we will be returning, because we can build our story accordingly." Executive producer Maurissa Tancharoen also noted that logistics for hiring directors for the season in advance would be easier, "which is a very nice privilege to have...that's a luxury". The end of the episode "What If..." features an onscreen tribute to Bill Paxton, who died in February 2017 and had portrayed John Garrett in the series' first season. The series paid additional tribute to Paxton in "All the Madame's Men" with promos during The Bakshi Report news segment showcasing John Garrett as a fallen American hero. The end of "World's End" features a similar onscreen tribute to Powers Boothe, who died in May 2017 and had portrayed Gideon Malick in the series' third season.

=== Writing ===
The season shifted to the later 10 pm timeslot, allowing it to take on a darker, more mature tone than previous seasons. According to Tancharoen, "The whole tagline for this year is 'Agents of S.H.I.E.L.D. After Dark'". The timeslot gave the series the opportunity to present an increased level of violence and partial nudity, as well as take more risks and present edgier themes. Following the third-season finale, Tancharoen stated that the fourth season would explore the guilt Daisy Johnson has over Lincoln Campbell's death. Executive producer Jeffrey Bell noted the writers tried to continue the tradition of "finding new combinations and new conflicts" between different sets of characters, given "a lot of procedurals [see] the same people doing the same thing for five years". Pairings that would be explored included Coulson and Mack, continuing from the end of season three, who have a mutual respect for one another due to their relationships with Daisy, and Leo Fitz and Holden Radcliffe, who work together. The Fitz-Simmons relationship was also explored more, examining the new challenges it presented for the two "working together, loving each other and living together".

Following the third season's dealing with the themes of Captain America: Civil War (2016), such as the opposing reactions to the Inhumans, Whedon said that the question of "How do you deal with a war with powered people at that level, a government level?" was one that they wanted to answer in the fourth season. Tancharoen called the Inhumans "a permanent part of our universe now", with Whedon adding, "we have a quick-fire way of introducing people with powers. It gives us a lot of leeway in our world, and it lets us explore the metaphors of what it is like to be different. We will never close that chapter." With the Inhumans film being removed from Marvel Studios' release schedule, the series had "a little more freedom" and were "able to do a little bit more" with the species, including the potential of introducing some of the "classic" Inhumans, though the series would focus less on Inhumans than the third season which saw "a real significant Inhuman agenda story". It was not intended to be a spin-off of Agents of S.H.I.E.L.D. On the evolution of S.H.I.E.L.D. to featuring so many powered characters, Whedon said "the dynamic in the world has changed. There was one person with powers, and then by The Avengers there were maybe six total ... now they're much more prevalent, so there's reaction from the public based on that."

The season is structured into three "pods" based on its airing schedule: the first eight episodes, subtitled Ghost Rider; LMD (Life Model Decoy) for the subsequent seven episodes; and a third pod for the final seven episodes called Agents of Hydra. Elements and characters cross over between the different pods, but the sections "definitely have a different feel" from one another, as Bell explained that 22 episodes "is a long time to hold a big bad or a single plot line, especially for an audience", and for the past two seasons, the series was able to have two separated halves that "allows us to introduce a big bad. And then, something happens and we rise somebody new ... Now, there's three of those." "Financial considerations" were also taken into account in creating the pods for the season, as using LMDs does not "cost as much as setting a guy's head on fire via CGI". In terms of writing the "complicated season", Whedon said the writers were "aware that our fans are our fans and have spent some time with these characters and are clever and see things coming sometimes ... Part of our job is to create not just what we are presenting on plot, but letting the audience be one step ahead of us and being one step ahead of that." He added that the writers knew that they wanted to tell a Ghost Rider story, an LMD story, and a "what if" scenario, and the hardest part was making each pod still fit together as a single season. The major connection ultimately became the Darkhold, which leads from the magic of Ghost Rider to the advanced science of LMD and then the Framework in Agents of Hydra. Ghost Rider also reappears in the final episode of the season, "World's End", as an additional connection.

==== Ghost Rider ====
While planning the fourth season, Marvel suggested that the series introduce Ghost Rider, after the character's film rights had returned to Marvel from Sony in May 2013. Loeb felt that this made the season unquestionably "the series' biggest" with the "most ambitious story yet". He added that "one of the things that we talked about is, S.H.I.E.L.D. always looked out for the weird, the unusual, the things that were and could be a problem for the public", and Marvel realized that Ghost Rider's abilities, which are more mystical than anything seen in the series to date, opened up "a quarter of the universe that we haven't really spent a lot of time exploring ... what happens if our very real, our very grounded agents who are very much a family have to take on something that is as bizarre and powerful and unique as Ghost Rider." Bell added that the producers would have been willing to give an entire season of the show to a Ghost Rider arc if the season was 13 episodes or less, but 22 episodes seemed too long to "feel like one flavor".

The Robbie Reyes version of Ghost Rider was chosen over other versions of the character from the comics because of his relationship with his brother Gabe, which Loeb said harkened back to the familial nature of the series. This also helped the series distance itself from Sony's films Ghost Rider (2007) and Ghost Rider: Spirit of Vengeance (2011) which starred Nicolas Cage as the Johnny Blaze version of the character. Bell described the series' take as more grounded than Cage's "larger-than-life version". During the series' take on Reyes' origin story, another Ghost Rider appears. While unnamed onscreen, Luna believed it was meant to be Johnny Blaze and that unspecified legal issues prevented this from being made explicit. This Ghost Rider was portrayed by Tom McComas during filming. Given the disparity between the other science-based aspects of the series and the mystical Ghost Rider in the season, Whedon noted that "some very advanced technology [would be developed] this season, and maybe–as that becomes more advanced and we have strange people... possessed people–those things somehow merge down the line". As part of combining technology and mysticism, the series depicts Hell as another dimension that can be reached through a portal, and the Ghost Rider's Spirit of Vengeance as a being from that other dimension.

Marvel trusted the producers of S.H.I.E.L.D. with creating and using Ghost Rider how they wanted to, but did ask them "to be true to what it is" in the comics. They looked to do this by taking the original elements from the comic, but putting their own spin on them. This included Reyes' uncle Eli, who is the spirit possessing Reyes in the comic, appearing as an external villain. Reyes is instead possessed by the Spirit of Vengeance, which is passed to him by another Ghost Rider; in the comics, multiple Ghost Riders exist at once, but for the series this was changed so the power can only be used by one at a time, and they pass it on to the next Ghost Rider.

==== LMD ====
Since the beginning of the show, the producers had wanted to introduce the concept of LMDs, which Marvel Television head Jeph Loeb noted "have always been part of S.H.I.E.L.D.'s history in the comics". However, they were unable to before Avengers: Age of Ultron (2015), which sees the introductions of Ultron and Vision in a similar manner to LMDs. For the fourth season, they particularly pushed the idea, and Whedon noted that the introduction of Ghost Rider and mysticism allowed the series to introduce new technology that could launch LMDs in a way deemed rewarding, so the Ghost Rider storyline "dovetails" into the LMD storyline. The S.H.I.E.L.D. program is introduced through the character Aida, an android. Additionally, with LMDs chosen as one of the pods for the season, Whedon said the writers questioned, "what are all the things we could do? You don't want to do the ones that have been done [in similar tropes], and you don't want to leave any on the table." One idea that "we knew we wanted to have early on" was to reveal that the majority of S.H.I.E.L.D. have been replaced at once.

Tancharoen hinted that the series would continue Age of Ultron's theme of "diving into the world of A.I. [and] things may not go as planned". On what makes Aida different from the villain Ultron, Whedon explained that "Aida started as something that was supposed to mimic human behavior. Ultron came out almost a fully fleshed-out creature with his own agenda, where she's been discovering hers along the way." He added that instead of thousands of robots, the LMDs would be presented as android versions of the other characters in the series. Whedon said of themes that are raised in the second pod, "there are issues of reality and identity. Trust is always an issue in a spy organization. It's much worse when you don't know if the person next to you is the person next to you ... When you get into trust, that's when things get emotional." The pod ends with the Melinda May LMD seemingly destroying herself and all the other known LMDs besides Aida, concluding her specific arc which explored the nature of humanity and identity. Asked if any of these LMDs survived this act, and could carry over to the third pod of the season, Whedon said "We'll see, but the idea was to put that chapter behind us."

==== Agents of Hydra ====
The third pod of the season "ties together [the season] thematically", taking the characters into the virtual world of the Framework, where their lives are different from the real world. This explores "what if" scenarios for many of the characters by showing who they may have been if a major regret of their life was changed, hence the pod's title, Agents of Hydra. This continues the season's focus on the nature of identity and reality, having "payoff[s] to all the reflection[s] on the past" such as Mack's tragic loss of his daughter and Fitz's troubled relationship with his father. Bennet called the pod "very relevant. It's definitely a theme that I think has been kind of hopping around in pop culture at the moment. But it's kind of like a fun Marvel take on that. For all those people who wished to see these characters in a different light, this is going to be the time for that to happen." Whedon felt that this storyline would not be interesting early in a series, but is rewarding after spending "80-plus episodes with these characters".

Whedon said they replaced S.H.I.E.L.D. with Hydra in the Framework to show "that this world was not what was intended, and what really symbolizes the opposite of S.H.I.E.L.D. or the ultimate evil in our world is Hydra. It's more about our people than it is about the organization itself this time around." It was noted that "the bad guy [Hydra] is in charge and Inhumans are being hunted" could be taken as a commentary on the political climate under the Presidency of Donald Trump. On approaching this subject, Tancharoen said that there was no nervousness in the writer's room, and Whedon said that the similarities to Trump's America was simply an attempt to "paint the reality where, what if the world just turned upside down?" The pod sees Hydra based out of the Triskelion, a S.H.I.E.L.D. building that was destroyed by Hydra previously in the MCU. It also features the return of the character Grant Ward to the series, with Whedon explaining, "We figured when you get dropped into an alternate reality, what better way to show that it might not be everything you imagined than the return of one of our most loved and most hated characters."

Whedon noted that the pod does not entirely take place in the Framework, and that the characters "have their full memories of what happened" once they return to the real world. Some, such as Fitz, struggle with their actions in the Framework. The producers felt the impact of the "what if" scenario comes from rooting the changes in character choices, with Bell saying, "I will give the writers room credit that everything that was chosen had an emotional resonance. It was something you hadn't seen, or wanted to see or wondered about, so for us it was really rich territory to mine." Whedon added, "It wasn't just, 'OK, let's go Wacky World!' It was, 'What if you'd made different decisions?' That made it for us a much more fun puzzle." Regarding the season finale and setting up the next season, Bell said that "Each year we've tried to reinvent the series in some way ... I think the end [of the finale] really does suggest something quite different."

=== Casting ===
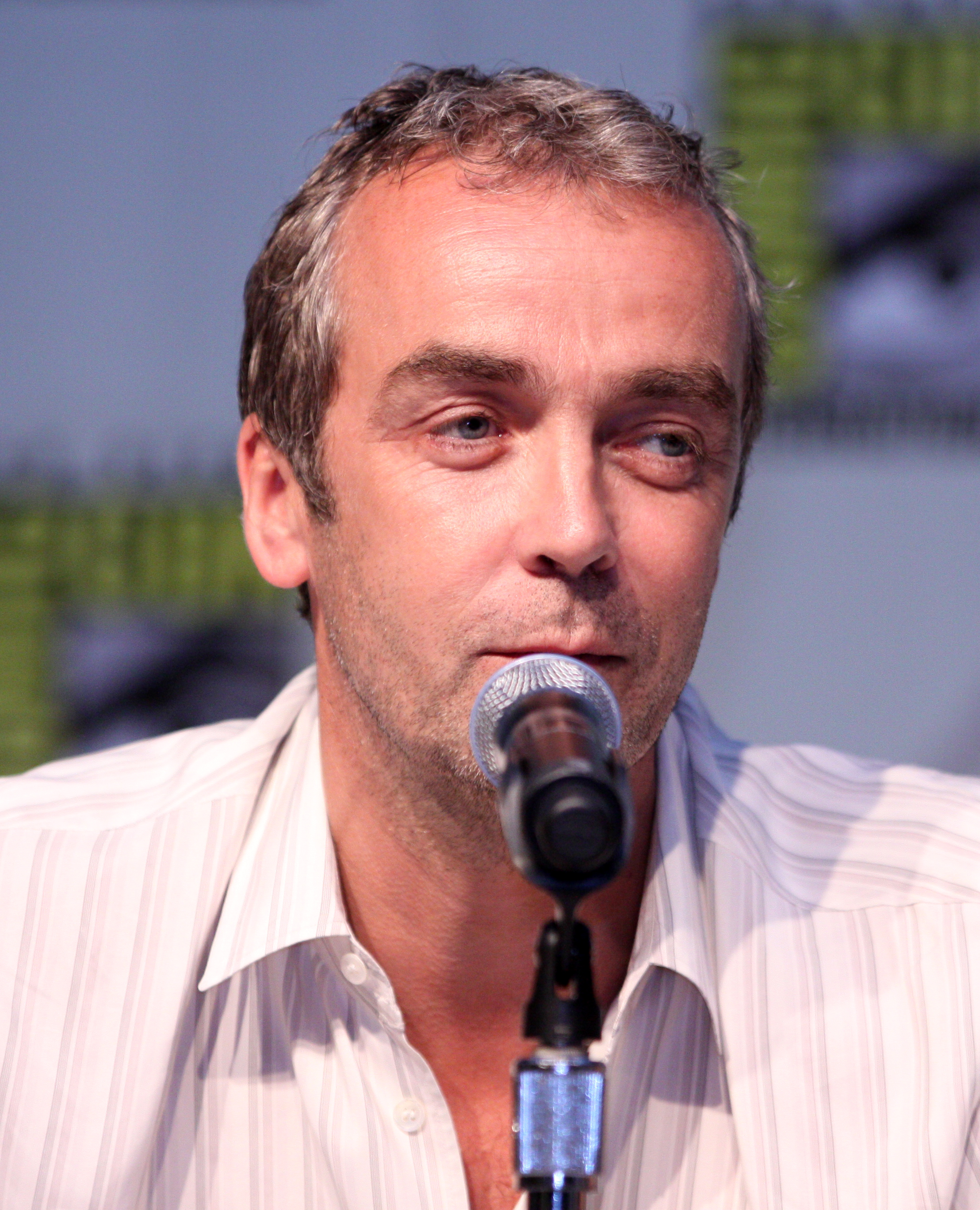
John Hannah joined the series' main cast for the season, promoted from his previously recurring role.

Main cast members Clark Gregg, Ming-Na Wen, Chloe Bennet, Iain De Caestecker, Elizabeth Henstridge and Henry Simmons return from previous seasons as Phil Coulson, Melinda May, Daisy Johnson / Quake, Leo Fitz, Jemma Simmons, and Alphonso "Mack" Mackenzie, respectively. They are joined by John Hannah as Holden Radcliffe, promoted from his third season recurring role. Within the Framework reality, Daisy is referred to by her original name, Skye, while Fitz is also known as "The Doctor".

Also returning from earlier in the series are Natalia Cordova-Buckley as Elena "Yo-Yo" Rodriguez, Axle Whitehead as J. T. James / Hellfire, Adrian Pasdar as Glenn Talbot, Ava Acres as Katya Belyakov, Patton Oswalt as Billy, Sam and Thurston Koenig, and Briana Venskus, Maximilian Osinski, and Alexander Wraith as Agents Piper, Davis, and Anderson, respectively. Agents of Hydra also sees the return of former series regular Brett Dalton as Grant Ward, along with the return of B. J. Britt as Antoine Triplett, Adam Kulbersh as Kenneth Turgeon, and Simon Kassianides as Sunil Bakshi.

Advertisements for the show ahead of the 2016 San Diego Comic-Con featuring a flaming chain led to speculation that the character Ghost Rider would be joining the series during the season, though it was noted that the image could just indicate an increased role for Whitehead after he was introduced as James in the third season, and also wields a flaming chain. When casting for two Latino brothers, "one of whom is always the most dangerous person in the room, the other paralyzed in a wheelchair", was revealed to be underway for the series in June, further speculation pointed to the inclusion of Ghost Rider, with those character descriptions resembling those for Marvel Comics' All-New Ghost Rider Robbie Reyes and his brother Gabe, respectively. At the series' Comic-Con panel, the speculation was confirmed—Gabriel Luna was announced to be cast as Robbie Reyes, and Lorenzo James Henrie was later revealed to be cast as Gabe.

Also in June, the series was looking to cast an actress for the recurring role of Aida, a robot whose artificial intelligence was briefly voiced by Amanda Rea during the third-season finale; Mallory Jansen was cast in the role that August. Jansen also portrays Agnes Kitsworth, Radcliffe's former lover and partner after whom he modeled Aida. Within the Framework reality, Aida appears as "Ophelia" / Madame Hydra, portrayed as well by Jansen. Other recurring guests revealed were Lilli Birdsell as Lucy Bauer, a worker at Momentum Energy; Jason O'Mara as Jeffrey Mace / Patriot, the new director of S.H.I.E.L.D.; Parminder Nagra as Ellen Nadeer, an anti-Inhuman politician; and Patrick Cavanaugh as S.H.I.E.L.D. PR agent Burrows. In October 2016, José Zúñiga was revealed to be portraying Eli Morrow, the Reyes' uncle, while in January 2017, Zach McGowan was revealed as Anton Ivanov, "The Superior" of the Watchdogs. In April 2017, Jordan Rivera was revealed as Hope Mackenzie, Mack's daughter in the Framework reality. Additionally, Blaise Miller and Ricardo Walker make multiple appearances as S.H.I.E.L.D. lab tech Nathanson and S.H.I.E.L.D. agent Prince.

In May 2016, Tancharoen said "we're always open" to the possibility of Adrianne Palicki and Nick Blood appearing in the season, after they left the series' cast during the third season for the spin-off series Marvel's Most Wanted, which ultimately did not get picked up. Whedon reiterated in January 2017 that "Once an agent, always an agent, so it's always out there in the ether", but stated that the pair were unlikely to return during the fourth season.

=== Design ===
Each pod of the season introduces new title graphics for the series: a "hellfire"-based title card for Ghost Rider; a graphic constructed from robot circuitry for LMD; and a more traditional Agents of S.H.I.E.L.D. logo for the third pod that changes onscreen to Agents of Hydra for episodes primarily set in the Framework, but remains Agents of S.H.I.E.L.D. during "The Return". The Ghost Rider title card was used again for the season finale. For the Framework setting, the production team chose a specific, more "washed" out palette to clearly differentiate those scenes from the real world. This was realized through a combination of production and costume design, and cinematography.

Ghost Rider was designed by Marvel Television creative director Joshua Shaw, based on Felipe Smith's design from the comics. His jacket was then custom made by costume designer Ann Foley and her team. The character's skull design includes exhaust-type jets of flames coming from the temples to mimic the effects on his car. Foley worked with the visual effects department to ensure that the costume would not interfere with their work. Aida's costume was also custom made, and inspired by the works of Alexander McQueen. The costume evolves through the season, becoming a darker shade of gray when the more ruthless "Aida 2.0" is introduced. Foley left the show after the thirteenth episode of the season, to work on a television adaptation of Altered Carbon, and was replaced with Amanda Riley. Riley used her previous experience recreating costumes to "blend in" with Foley's established look, and also noted that the majority of her work was designing for the Framework reality which allowed her to not exactly match with previous designs. Riley took Foley's costumes for Aida as the base shape of the Madame Hydra costume, but looked to make it feel "stronger" and more military-esque than those costumes by having the shoulders of the costume evoke epaulettes. The costume uses the color green, which is closely tied with the character in the comics.

For the Darkhold, writer Lilla Zuckerman suggested that the book's cover should feature the word "Darkhold" as an ambigram, with the series' props department designing a new font to achieve this. Prop master Scott Bauer was inspired by elements from the Kree weaponry designed for the previous season when designing the cover of the Darkhold. Multiple versions of the book were created for the show, with the frames created by 3D-printing molds to create durable rubber casts. These were then given to a bookbinder with aged, vellum pages, who assembled the props and created the leather cover. The pages were filled with text and illustrations inspired by Leonardo da Vinci's Vitruvian Man.

=== Filming ===
Production on the season began on July 21, 2016, in Los Angeles. Whedon made his directorial debut with "Self Control". Whedon noted he had decided at the end of season three to direct an episode in season four after doing some second unit work on "Spacetime" under Kevin Tancharoen. He credited his brother and series creator Joss Whedon along with Tancharoen, and his "years working with S.H.I.E.L.D.'s directors from a showrunning perspective and his close relationship with the cast and crew" for why now was the right time for him to direct an episode. The cast expressed enthusiasm with Whedon directing "Self Control", given he also wrote the episode, with Bennet feeling, "The vision is so clear. There's a lot more room to play, like 'what about this?' and the enthusiasm because he wrote these words, he knows what's coming next. It's been so much fun." Ahead of filming the final episode of the season, Wen injured her leg in an on set accident with "a fairly severe injury". Wen noted the production was able to work around her injury with no delay and that she would still be involved with the episode. Production on the season concluded on April 17, 2017.

=== Music ===
The season saw "several major creative turning points" in the score from composer Bear McCreary. Given the introduction of Ghost Rider and the Framework in the season, McCreary used "searing synths" over the regular symphonic orchestra.

=== Marvel Cinematic Universe tie-ins ===
In March 2016, Tancharoen stated that there was a possibility the season could continue the story of Agent Carter (2015–2016) in some way, given it was not renewed for the 2016–17 season. Whedon added that "We are linked to them through history [but] whether or not we'll tell their stories remains to be seen." The Momentum Energy Labs group introduced in the season is eventually revealed to be a successor to the Isodyne Energy company from the second season of Agent Carter. The two companies are connected by the parent company Roxxon, a mainstay of the MCU, and deal with supernatural entities: Isodyne discovered the extra-dimensional Darkforce, while Momentum is shown experimenting on extra-dimensional energy using the Darkhold, the Book of Sins from the comics. In December, Whedon said that Peggy Carter "is a part of the universe, and she's a character we care about", and that there was a good chance of having bigger connections to her show moving forward after the Ghost Rider pod.

The season's exploring of supernatural and mystical concepts ties-in with the release of Doctor Strange (2016), the first MCU film to explore magic. In addition to the Darkhold, this includes the introduction of Ghost Rider, with Whedon explaining in July 2016, that "the Marvel [Cinematic] Universe is moving into new waters [with the upcoming release of Doctor Strange]. We felt that [Ghost Rider] was obviously a great character that we'd love to have on our show that we feel fits with that shift." Whedon pointed out that the previous tie-ins were sometimes "very direct", and other times "more thematic. The tie this year will feel more of a reflection of [Doctor Strange], less an interweaving plot." He added, "Hopefully some of the questions that we're asking will be answered by [the film, which can] then pose some new themes and ideas for us to explore." "Deals with Our Devils", aired after the release of Doctor Strange, sees Aida create a portal to rescue Coulson and Fitz from another dimension. The visuals for these are intentionally reminiscent of those used in the film. Bell added that the Darkhold "feels like it belongs in the library in Kathmandu", referring to the Kamar-Taj library seen in Doctor Strange.

On the season having a big crossover in early 2017 like previous seasons, Bell said that any crossover will not be as large scale as the first season crossover with Captain America: The Winter Soldier (2014), which changed the premise of the series, and noted that the MCU film being released at that time is Guardians of the Galaxy Vol. 2 (2017), which would be difficult to tie-in with as it is not set on Earth, and takes place earlier in the MCU continuity than the season is set.

== Marketing ==
In July 2016, members of the cast and the executive producers attended San Diego Comic-Con to promote the season. The trolly used to transport attendees at San Diego Comic-Con was covered in advertisements for the series, highlighting the addition of Ghost Rider. Also, Ghost Rider's 1969 Dodge Charger was revealed on the show floor. The first teaser trailer for the season was released in early September 2016, as "found footage" showing Ghost Rider's car "peeling out", followed shortly after by a teaser with actual footage from the series. The premiere episode "The Ghost" was first screened on September 19, 2016, and the episode "Uprising" was screened on October 7, when Gregg, Bennet, and Luna were promoting the series at New York Comic Con.

A six-part web series, Agents of S.H.I.E.L.D.: Slingshot, debuted on ABC.com on December 13, 2016. It follows Elena "Yo–Yo" Rodriguez on a secret mission, with Cordova-Buckley reprising her role, shortly before the start of season four. Gregg, O'Mara, Simmons, Bennet, Wen, De Caestecker and Henstridge all reprise their roles in the series. In March 2017, Marvel re-released previous posters for the series, updated to show what they would have looked like had the series taken place in the Framework reality. They also released faux propaganda posters highlighting Hydra's surveillance state within the Framework, and their focus on hunting Inhumans. The episode "What If..." was screened on April 1, 2017, at WonderCon, with members of the cast, including Dalton, and the show's executive producers promoting the series.

== Release ==
=== Broadcast ===
The season began airing in the United States on ABC on September 20, 2016, and completed its 22-episode run on May 16, 2017. Unlike the previous two seasons, which were split into "two little mini-seasons" based on their airing schedule, this season was broken into three different sections by the schedule. This led to the season's three pod story structure, which Tancharoen said "has made our lives easier, to break it down in that way".

=== Home media ===
The season began streaming on Netflix in the United States on June 15, 2017, and was available until February 28, 2022. It was released on Blu-ray and DVD in Region 2 on July 2, 2018, by Walt Disney Studios Home Entertainment. It became available on Disney+ in the United States on March 16, 2022, joining other territories where it was already available on the service.

== Reception ==
=== Ratings ===
Viewership and ratings per episode of Agents of S.H.I.E.L.D. season 4
No.	Title	Air date	Rating/share (18–49)	Viewers (millions)	DVR (18–49)	DVR viewers (millions)	Total (18–49)	Total viewers (millions)
1	"The Ghost"	September 20, 2016	1.1/4	3.44	1.1	2.79	2.2	6.24
2	"Meet the New Boss"	September 27, 2016	0.9/3	2.95	1.0	2.43	1.9	5.39
3	"Uprising"	October 11, 2016	0.9/3	2.68	1.0	2.21	1.9	4.89
4	"Let Me Stand Next to Your Fire"	October 18, 2016	0.7/3	2.34	1.1	2.44	1.8	4.78
5	"Lockup"	October 25, 2016	0.8/3	2.30	0.9	2.25	1.7	4.55
6	"The Good Samaritan"	November 1, 2016	0.8/3	2.43	0.9	2.14	1.7	4.57
7	"Deals with Our Devils"	November 29, 2016	0.8/3	2.41	0.9	2.22	1.7	4.63
8	"The Laws of Inferno Dynamics"	December 6, 2016	0.7/3	2.37	0.9	2.12	1.6	4.49
9	"Broken Promises"	January 10, 2017	0.8/3	2.72	0.8	1.94	1.6	4.66
10	"The Patriot"	January 17, 2017	0.6/2	2.03	0.9	2.02	1.5	4.05
11	"Wake Up"	January 24, 2017	0.6/2	2.00	0.8	1.97	1.4	3.97
12	"Hot Potato Soup"	January 31, 2017	0.6/2	2.15	0.9	2.08	1.5	4.23
13	"BOOM"	February 7, 2017	0.7/3	2.08	0.8	2.04	1.5	4.13
14	"The Man Behind the Shield"	February 14, 2017	0.6/2	2.13	0.9	2.03	1.5	4.16
15	"Self Control"	February 21, 2017	0.6/2	2.01	0.8	1.87	1.4	3.88
16	"What If..."	April 4, 2017	0.7/3	2.15	0.8	2.07	1.5	4.22
17	"Identity and Change"	April 11, 2017	0.7/3	2.32	0.8	1.68	1.5	4.01
18	"No Regrets"	April 18, 2017	0.8/3	2.43	0.7	1.82	1.5	4.25
19	"All the Madame's Men"	April 25, 2017	0.7/3	2.15	—N/a	—N/a	—N/a	—N/a
20	"Farewell, Cruel World!"	May 2, 2017	0.7/3	2.15	0.7	1.60	1.4	3.75
21	"The Return"	May 9, 2017	0.7/3	2.14	0.9	1.88	1.6	4.02
22	"World's End"	May 16, 2017	0.7/3	2.08	0.8	1.99	1.5	4.07

The season's new timeslot, 10 p.m. on Tuesday, was nicknamed the "death slot" for ABC by commentators, with nine different series being scheduled in the slot between 2011 and 2017, and all of them dropping in viewership while airing then. This was the same for Agents of S.H.I.E.L.D. season 4, which reached series' lows of 0.6 live ratings and around 2 million viewers, a drop from the third season of around 30 percent. However, by the season finale it was described as having "helped solve [ABC]'s problem" in the timeslot, while being "a solid DVR performer" and draw for international viewership. This led to the renewal of the series for a fifth season. The season averaged 4.22 million total viewers, including from DVR, ranking 110th among network series in the 2016–17 television season. It also had an average total 18–49 rating of 1.5, which was 70th.

=== Critical response ===
The review aggregator website Rotten Tomatoes reports a 96% approval rating with an average score of 7.8/10, based on 25 reviews. The website's consensus reads, "Agents of S.H.I.E.L.D. explores darker territory in its fourth season with the thrilling introduction of Ghost Rider, setting up an action-packed new chapter of Marvel's edgier mythologies."

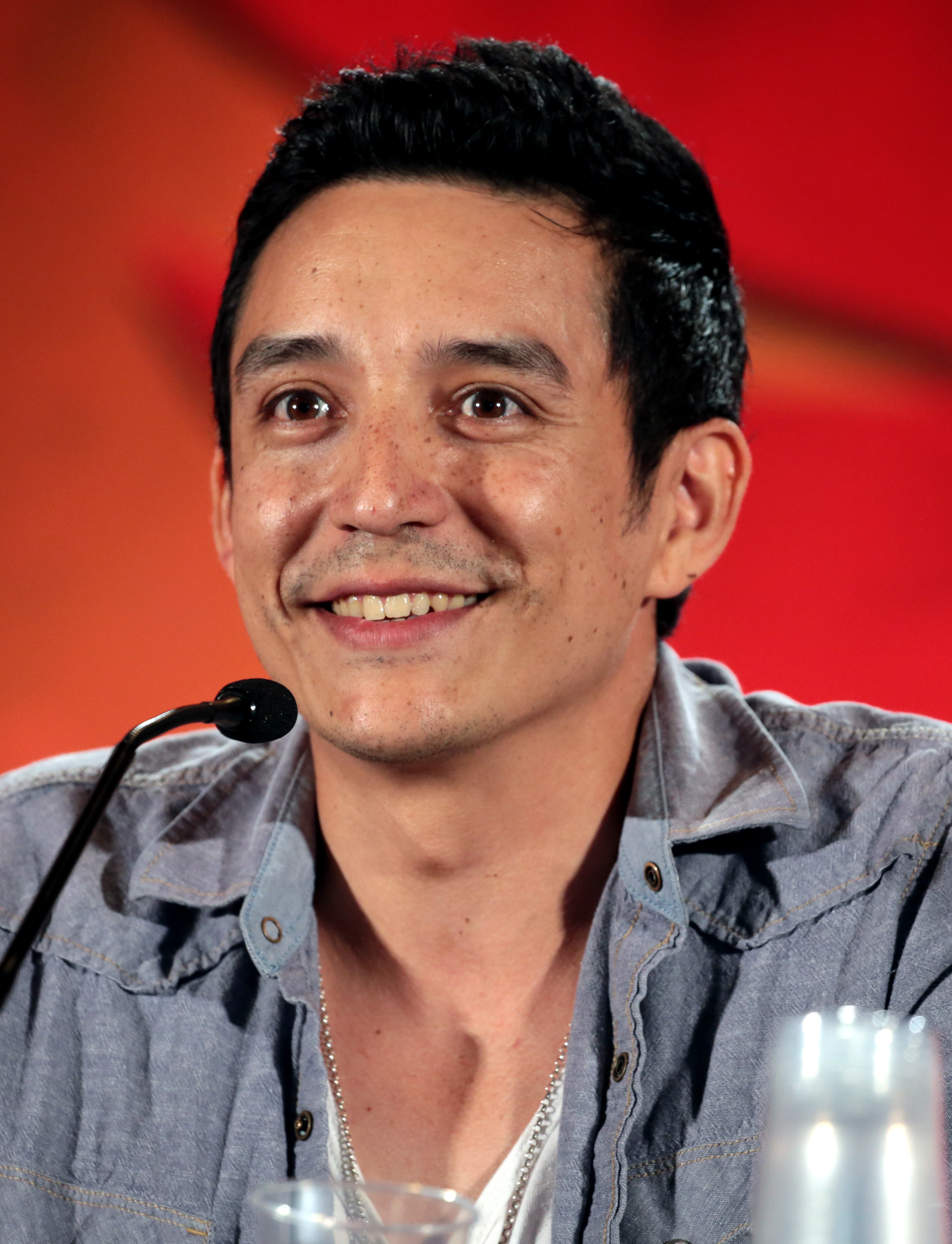
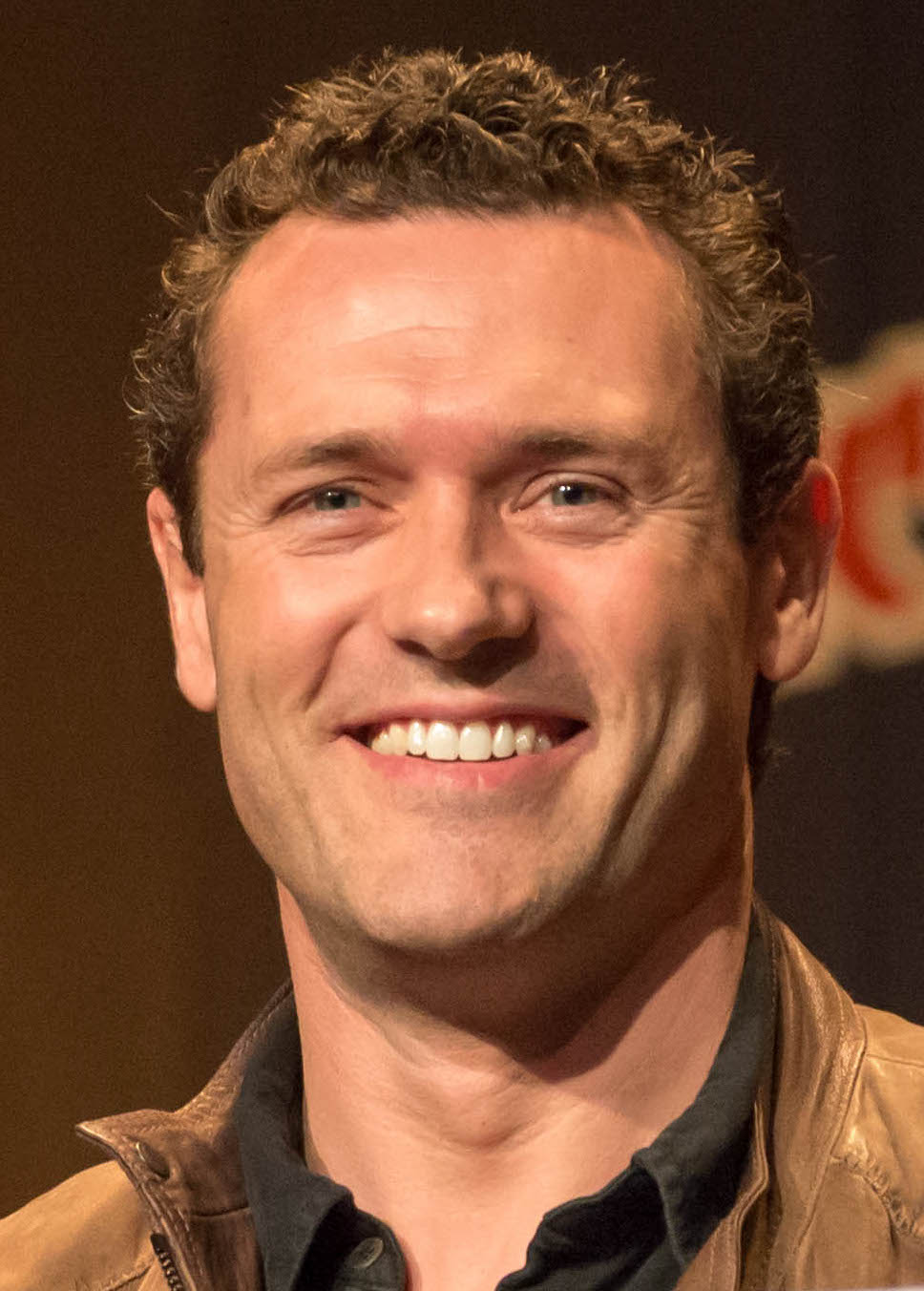
The season's recurring guests, including (L-R) Gabriel Luna (Robbie Reyes / Ghost Rider) and Jason O'Mara (Jeffrey Mace / Patriot), were highlighted by critics.

Reviewing the premiere, Terri Schwartz of IGN praised the introduction of Ghost Rider and subsequent darker tone which "will eventually allow [the series] to sit more comfortably beside its corporate cousins over on Netflix", but did feel that there were some "growing pains" with the transition to more mature material. The A.V. Club's Alex McCown-Levy called it "a standard first episode back, in that it once again does a lot of table-setting, and not always in the most compelling manner". Levy felt that Ghost Rider's introduction was handled well for non-comic fans discovering the character with the show, but that the new positions of the series' main characters were more interesting and should have been focused on more. Kevin Fitzpatrick of ScreenCrush said, "I'm nervous for Season 4 overall, especially if said reinvention doesn't goose the ratings like Marvel and ABC hope, but 'The Ghost' is reason enough for some casual optimism." He was positive about the new similarities to the darker series Daredevil, but felt that the series "doesn't have the firmest handle" on Ghost Rider yet. Evan Valentine, writing for Collider, said that the series "certainly benefits somewhat from taking a page from" the Marvel Netflix series, highlighting the number of more mature elements in the episode's opening as "a nice introduction that shows you this may not exactly be the same show you've gotten to know over the years".

For the change from Ghost Rider to LMD, Joseph McCabe at Nerdist said that any doubts he had about the change "are more or less eliminated" by the series take on a robotic antagonist, which he called "Avengers: Age of Ultron done right ... where it most obviously improves on the overstuffed second Avengers film is in the humor department". Schwartz called the transition smooth, and felt the series' ongoing Inhuman subplot complemented the LMD storyline well. Valentine said that the beginning of LMD "doesn't maintain the heights of [the series'] days with Ghost Rider in the driver's seat, but it does manage to remain a solid entry on the airwaves". He was very critical of the Inhuman subplot, calling the Watchdogs "pretty much played out at this point" and feeling the Inhumans had become stale after the previous two seasons. Fitzpatrick also criticized the "flat" Inhuman storyline, but felt the change to LMD "got off to the best possible start" given the "obviously less of an immediate hook" than Ghost Rider. Beginning the Agents of Hydra pod, Schwartz said "this return episode more than delivered" on the previous episode's cliffhanger. She was satisfied that the Framework reality was not undone within a single episode, and was hopeful that the remaining episodes of the season would offer "similar surprises [that circumvent] our expectations". Valentine felt "What If..." "made for a very good start" to the pod, feeling it "continues to build on the goodwill created by season 4 of S.H.I.E.L.D. presenting an interesting concept and world to be explored". McCown-Levy continued the praise, saying "This could've been a sodden slog through too-obvious reveals and portentous doom and gloom. Instead, S.H.I.E.L.D. kept its fleet and efficient pacing, but bent it to the service of a dark and compelling narrative arc already paying dividends in terms of rewarding long-time viewers with deep-pull references and stories". Fitzpatrick, however, felt the episode "stumbled" and was "something of a bumpy reentry into season 4, and doubly so for anyone who lost sight of the Life Model Decoy conflict in play, or harbor concern ABC might not order a fifth season". He found it difficult to determine the rules at play in the Framework, and felt the storyline was done more so because the "producers missed working with Brett Dalton".

By "All the Madame's Men", McCown-Levy felt that Agents of Hydra was "the most consistently entertaining arc the series has ever done. The show has had higher highs, but never this constant a level of quality. I've argued several times of late that Agents of S.H.I.E.L.D. has been getting steadily better each season, and even in a year that had strong arcs like Ghost Rider and LMD, this final storyline tops them all ... the show has essentially managed to create an alternate reality where it can work out longstanding issues and address unfinished character beats, all while smartly delivering action and thrills ... And insofar as this keeps working, it's managed to turn the TV equivalent of a fun B-movie into a superior television show." Overall, Schwartz awarded the season an 8.8 out of 10, stating the season was "the best [the series has] ever been, maturing as a show and learning the right lessons from what's come before". She praised the pod format, saying it "helped tighten the season and give it a stronger throughline" and added that each new pod the season introduced was more successful than the previous, with the Agents of Hydra pod and Framework story arc possibly the strongest of the entire series. Schwartz also spoke fondly of the guest stars throughout the season, particularly Jansen, who she called "the season's MVP" and felt "stole the show" with Aida, who was "the standout new character" of the season. Some negatives on the season were the additional villains, Eli Morrow and the Superior (not "a particularly standout villain", and never "as imposing or terrifying as he should have been", respectively), and some of the early effects work, though she also praised "the great CGI work" with Ghost Rider. Den of Geek's Rob Leane also praised the pod format, saying it "fixed the 22-episode problem". He felt the Ghost Rider pod had amazing visual effects, and was a "natural" length that other series may have stretched further. He also highlighted Wen's performance as LMD May in the LMD pod and the Agents of Hydra pod's Mack and Hope storyline, and praised the guest performances of Luna and Jansen (feeling that bringing the latter two together in the finale "was the perfect way to wrap things up"). Leane called the season "a master class in how Agents Of S.H.I.E.L.D. can thrive going forward ... the writers keep throwing in more sci-fi concepts, the special effects team keep delivering, and the cast keep stepping up their game to keep up with it all."

=== Analysis ===
Many critics noted the commentary on the Trump administration during the Agents of Hydra pod, including Hydra leader Fitz wanting to "make society great again" and saying of Daisy "Nevertheless, she persisted", news reporter Bakshi offering to take a female colleague furniture shopping, and Coulson referring to Hydra's approved history as "alternative facts". Valentine described this as "one of the prevalent themes" of the pod, and felt that "S.H.I.E.L.D. has managed to throw in some biting commentary this season". McCown-Levy said that during the pod, "it became clear the show was leaving behind its former tactic of satisfying itself with coy allusions and nods to the contemporary political reality in the U.S. The Framework is giving this series an opportunity to express its displeasure with the current administration." He also noted that Fitz's Framework upbringing was justified in comparison to the actions of Nazis, which he found to be more effective than the other commentary since tied to character development.

Amanda Marcotte of Salon felt that by May 2017, there "hasn't been time for most of pop culture to react to [Trump's election] but there is one truly remarkable exception to the rule: Marvel's Agents of S.H.I.E.L.D. ... the writers and producers did a remarkable job shaping the latter half of this season into a horror-show mirror of what it feels like for liberals living in Trump's America." Marcotte noted that the "Resistance" is lead, for the audience, by two women in Daisy and Simmons, reflecting the 2017 Women's March, and also that Hydra gained power using fear of Inhumans just as "Trump was able to ride a wave of anti-immigrant sentiment into power". She also highlighted Simmons' warning to a young boy that all Hydra agent are Nazis, calling this a warning "to the audience, reminding them not to forget exactly what kind of authoritarian monster has been put in the White House". Michal Schick of Hypable noted that the political commentary had been running throughout the season, with Nadeer and the Humans First movement, but that "in the face of murderous demons with combustible craniums and body-swapping LMD's, Agents of S.H.I.E.L.D. largely kept the commentary in the background. That changed—drastically—as the show entered" the final pod. Schick highlighted the fact that "for all of the clear allusions to Trump's America, the president himself remains unparodied. The mistress of the Framework's perversities is Aida, as Madame Hydra, and it's hard to imagine a more different figure from Trump ... By omitting this easiest and most obvious point of satire, Agents of S.H.I.E.L.D. broadens its message beyond straight contemporary commentary. It is easy (and desperately tempting) to place blame all of our ills and evils on a current administration, and easy to pin all the ills of the Framework on Aida. But an element of individual responsibility burns through, both in our own lives and in this fiction."

Writing for Polygon, Eric Watson said that "Agents of S.H.I.E.L.D.'s fourth season pulls the best elements from the MCU and the most over-the-top elements from comics to remind me why I love Marvel: superheroes punching Nazis." He said this was refreshing after the controversial comic storyline Secret Empire which sees the patriotic Captain America revealed to be a sleeper agent for Hydra. Carli Velocci at TheWrap also discussed the season in relation to Secret Empire, noting that Agents of Hydra "hasn't spawned a digital mountain of outrage" like the comic event. She said that Secret Empire "all but ignores [the] real world context, minus acknowledging that Nazis tend to like concentration camps. If anything, it treats the subject matter like window dressing, background for a plot intended to blow readers' minds ... Agents of S.H.I.E.L.D, however, embraces that real world context. It does everything it can to ensure that the real world still matters and that the audience understands the negative consequences of a Nazi-driven society. And unlike the comic book counterpart, it doesn't shy away from the fact that Hydra is definitely rooted in the Third Reich." She continued that the series "manages to create a world where Hydra is the establishment, but every other plot point is about questioning it explicitly" and "what's more inspiring than seeing an actual symbol of America not taking crap from Nazis? Wherever the comic series takes Captain America, it shouldn't have lost sight of that. Fortunately, Agents of S.H.I.E.L.D. didn't."

=== Accolades ===
Agents of S.H.I.E.L.D. was included on Laura Hurley of CinemaBlend's Top 10 Shows of 2016 list, ranking 2nd. Comic Book Resources named "The Ghost" as the 15th best episode in 2016 among comic book-related television series.

Year	Award	Category	Nominee(s)	Result	Ref.
2017	Golden Reel Awards	TV – Short Form – Dialogue/ADR	"Deals with Our Devils"	Nominated	
2017	Kids' Choice Awards	Favorite Family TV Show	Agents of S.H.I.E.L.D.	Nominated	
2017	Saturn Awards	Best Superhero Adaptation Television Series	Agents of S.H.I.E.L.D.	Nominated	
2017	Teen Choice Awards	Choice Action TV Show	Agents of S.H.I.E.L.D.	Nominated	
2017	Teen Choice Awards	Choice Action TV Actor	Gabriel Luna	Nominated	
2017	Dragon Awards	Best Science Fiction or Fantasy TV Series	Agents of S.H.I.E.L.D.	Nominated	
2018	Irish Film & Television Awards	Actor in a Supporting Role – Drama	Jason O'Mara	Nominated	
