= Uprising (Agents of S.H.I.E.L.D.) =

- Agents of S.H.I.E.L.D. episode
- Promotional poster
- Episode no.: Season 4 Episode 3
- Directed by: Magnus Martens
- Written by: Craig Titley
- Cinematography by: Feliks Parnell
- Editing by: Kelly Stuyvesant
- Original air date: October 11, 2016

Guest appearances
- Gabriel Luna as Robbie Reyes / Ghost Rider; Parminder Nagra as Ellen Nadeer; Natalia Cordova-Buckley as Elena "Yo-Yo" Rodriguez; Lorenzo James Henrie as Gabe Reyes; Mallory Jansen as Aida; Valery Ortiz as Maria; Derek Hughes as the Amazing Mertz; Jason O'Mara as Jeffrey Mace

Episode chronology
← Previous "Meet the New Boss"	Next → "Let Me Stand Next to Your Fire"
- Agents of S.H.I.E.L.D. season 4

"Uprising" is the third episode of the fourth season of the American television series Agents of S.H.I.E.L.D. Based on the Marvel Comics organization S.H.I.E.L.D., it follows Phil Coulson and his team of S.H.I.E.L.D. agents as they face worldwide attacks on Inhumans. It is set in the Marvel Cinematic Universe (MCU) and acknowledges the franchise's films. The episode was written by Craig Titley and directed by Magnus Martens.

Clark Gregg reprises his role as Coulson from the film series, and is joined by series regulars Ming-Na Wen, Chloe Bennet, Iain De Caestecker, Elizabeth Henstridge, Henry Simmons, and John Hannah. The episode explores the increasing threat of the Watchdogs terrorist group, and introduces recurring guest star Parminder Nagra as Ellen Nadeer, a U.S. senator working with the Watchdogs. The episode also further explores other recurring guests, including Gabriel Luna's Robbie Reyes and Natalia Cordova-Buckley's Elena Rodriguez, and sees S.H.I.E.L.D. announced as a government organization after working in secret since the end of the first season. It is part of the first "pod" of eight episodes for the season, subtitled Ghost Rider.

"Uprising" debuted at New York Comic Con, before airing on ABC on October 11, 2016. The episode was watched by 4.89 million viewers within a week of its release. Critical response was mostly positive, with praise going to the episode's action and the cast's chemistry, but several story elements were criticized as forced. The S.H.I.E.L.D. announcement was seen to be overly ambitious for the series given the MCU films are considered unlikely to ever acknowledge it.

== Plot ==
Inhuman and S.H.I.E.L.D. asset Elena "Yo-Yo" Rodriguez is attending a bachelorette party for a friend in Miami when power throughout the city goes out. A group claiming to be the Inhuman resistance takes responsibility for this, but with no known Inhuman having the power to do such a thing, S.H.I.E.L.D. believes that an EMP device has been used.

In Los Angeles, Robbie Reyes and Daisy Johnson, the vigilantes Ghost Rider and Quake, plan to visit the former's uncle in prison to talk to him about his past working at Momentum Energy labs, which they are investigating. However, another blackout hits that city, and the pair race to get Robbie's brother Gabe. Fighting off some looters, Johnson injures her arms, so when they get Gabe to safety, Robbie goes to get her medical supplies. While he is gone, Gabe tells Johnson that he recognizes her as Quake, and asks her to leave his brother to keep him out of trouble.

In Miami, S.H.I.E.L.D. agents Phil Coulson, Alphonso "Mack" Mackenzie, and Leo Fitz arrive to find a group of armed men holding the bachelorette party at gun point, searching for an Inhuman. Yo-Yo helps the agents fight off the group, revealing her Inhuman abilities to her friends who spurn her. Fitz uses non-electronic tracking methods to find the EMP used to take out the power, which they find to be run by Watchdogs, anti-Inhuman terrorists who have used the "resistance" as a cover to target Inhumans around the world. The agents disarm the EMP, now knowing that someone with access to the government's Inhuman register must be backing the Watchdogs.

Agent Jemma Simmons and S.H.I.E.L.D. ally Holden Radcliffe are able to save agent Melinda May from a mysterious illness by killing her and then restarting her heart (which is mildly delayed by another blackout). After all of the Watchdogs' EMPs are disabled around the world, S.H.I.E.L.D. director Jeffrey Mace looks to avoid mass fear and anti-Inhuman feelings by announcing S.H.I.E.L.D. as a public organization after working in secret for years. Senator Ellen Nadeer, the leader of the Humans First political movement, later speaks out against S.H.I.E.L.D. She then receives a report from the Watchdogs, whom she is actually working with, and it is revealed that she has a brother who is trapped within an Inhuman Terrigen cocoon.

== Production ==
=== Development and writing ===
In September 2016, Marvel revealed that the third episode of the season would be titled "Uprising". The episode is written by Craig Titley, with Magnus Martens directing. Martens previously directed for the Marvel Netflix series Luke Cage. "Uprising" is part of the first "pod" of eight episodes for the season, subtitled Ghost Rider. When the series' writers were first breaking the story for the episode, Lilla Zuckerman suggested that a blackout would be a perfect opportunity for Ghost Rider to break into a prison and murder criminals. The other writers loved the idea, but the situation did not fit into the episode. The idea later became the basis for the episode "Lockup".

With S.H.I.E.L.D. being announced as a legitimate organization again, after working in secret since the end of the series' first season, executive producer Jed Whedon said that the reaction to this would be mixed, as "there are people who, as we see with the senator, are outspoken against Inhumans and will be against any form of protection for them. There are also people who are afraid. The idea of bringing S.H.I.E.L.D. back into the light is to ease their fears. So it's going to be mixed." Elaborating on this fear of Inhumans, Whedon said, "the fun part about a genre TV show is you can speak in metaphor. There is a lot of fear of the other in our world right now. We get to do that with humans and Inhumans. We get to tackle those issues head-on without ever really talking about them."

Actor Gabriel Luna said that Robbie Reyes chose to work with Daisy Johnson after the last episode because "I respect her power and I respect her. I understand that she's going in the same direction I am, she's seeking the same ends that I am, so I offer the opportunity for her to jump in and saddle up and we go find these things out." He noted that they "get sidetracked" with the blackouts in this episode, and then Gabe asks Johnson to leave. Luna said "that look on his face you see is perhaps a little disappointment in that he started to have a bond with someone he hasn't killed. I think that face you see is one of—not fear, but definitely concern that the one person who knows that Robbie Reyes is Ghost Rider is now back out there running around, doing whatever she has to do." Whedon called Gabe asking Johnson to leave Robbie "another blow to Daisy and her emotional makeup" as she "has been trying to operate alone, because she doesn't want to be a danger to anyone else. Now ... Gabe voices her very fear".

Additionally, discussing May's death and revival at the hands of Dr. Radcliffe in the episode, Whedon said, "she's May, so she's kind of like, 'Oh, that happened', But she now has common ground with Coulson, as if they didn't have enough common ground as it is." Executive producer Maurissa Tancharoen added that May's dying "will impact her life in ways that you may not expect at this point in time."

=== Casting ===
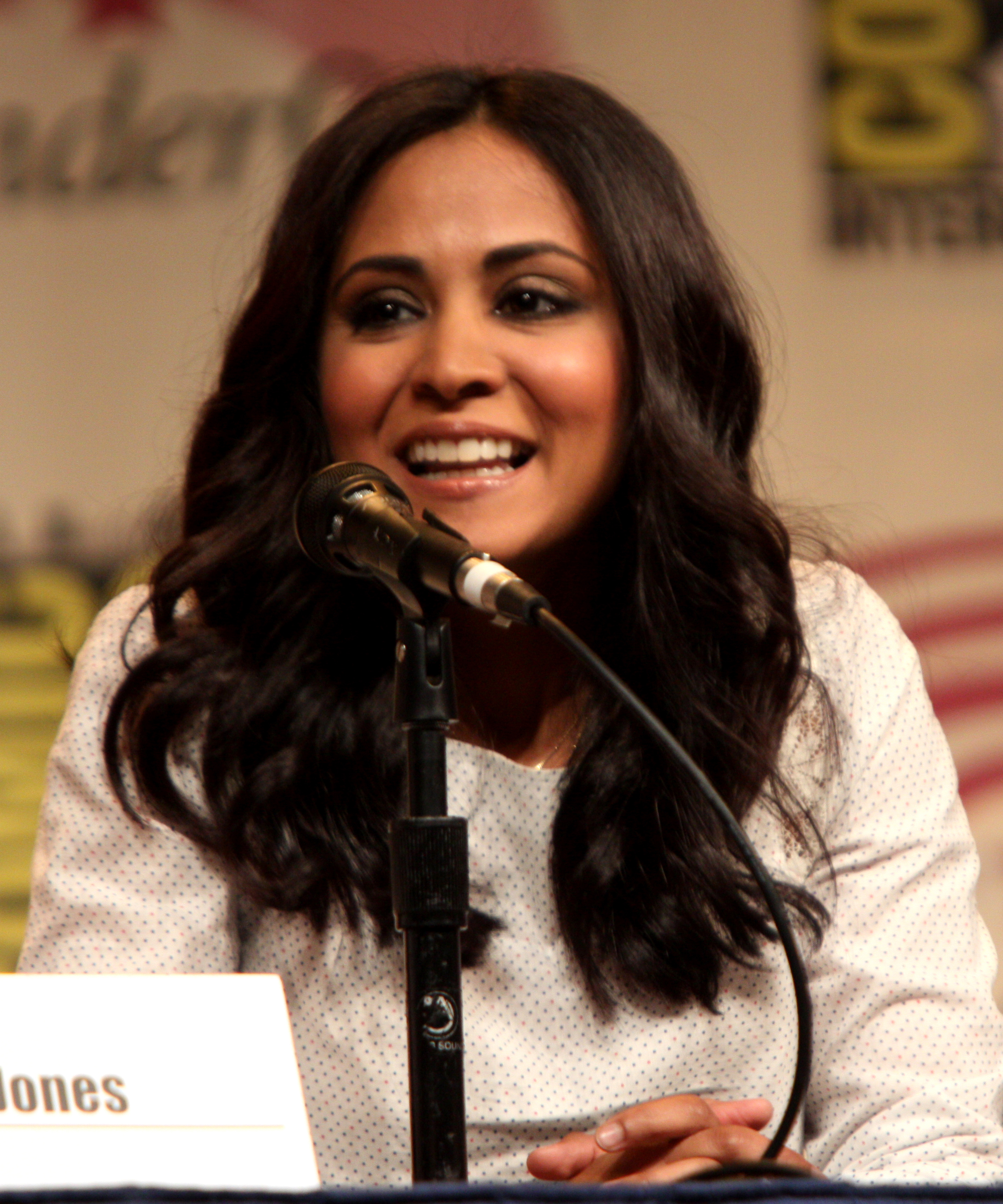
The episode introduces recurring guest star Parminder Nagra as Ellen Nadeer, an anti-Inhuman senator.

In August 2016, Parminder Nagra was cast in the recurring role of an anti-Inhuman politician. The next month, her character was revealed to be Senator Rota Nadeer, to first appear in "Uprising", Nadeer's first name was later revealed to actually be Ellen. Marvel also confirmed to appear in the episode main cast members Clark Gregg as Phil Coulson, Ming-Na Wen as Melinda May, Chloe Bennet as Daisy Johnson, Iain De Caestecker as Leo Fitz, Elizabeth Henstridge as Jemma Simmons, Henry Simmons as Alphonso "Mack" Mackenzie, and John Hannah as Holden Radcliffe. The episode introduces backstory concerning Nadeer's brother, and her reasoning for being anti-Inhumans, to be explored in later episodes.

In addition to Nagra, guest stars for the episode include Natalia Cordova-Buckley as Elena "Yo-Yo" Rodriguez, Jason O'Mara as the Director, Gabriel Luna as Robbie Reyes, Mallory Jansen as Aida, Alexander Wraith as Agent Anderson, Lorenzo James Henrie as Gabe Reyes, Patrick Cavanaugh as Burrows, Ricky Saenz as pistol punk, Devon Libran as slugger punk, Valery Ortiz as Maria, Derek Hughes as The Amazing Mertz, Preston Flagg as Darryl, Stephanie Maura Sanchez as bridesmaid #1, Jen Kuo Sung as Chen, Dale Pavinski as Briggs, Michael Cory Davis as agitator, Aaron Gaffrey as mystery figure and Adriana Diaz as hostage. Cordova-Buckley, O'Mara, Luna, Jansen, Wraith, Henrie, and Sung reprise their roles from earlier in the series. The Amazing Mertz is a magician, with Hughes himself having reached the finals of America's Got Talent in 2015 with a magic act.

Cordova-Buckley, who began appearing on the show during the third season, was surprised to find the writers' characterization of Rodriguez in the episode to closely mirror her own life. Cordova-Buckley stated that, like how Rodriguez is seen in the episode, she dislikes nightclubs, and has found herself changing over time to be a different person from who her old friends remember; for Cordova-Buckley, this was seen in returning to Mexico after becoming an actor in the United States, which is reflected with Rodriguez's friends from Colombia from before she worked with S.H.I.E.L.D. as an Inhuman asset.

== Release ==
"Uprising" was first screened at New York Comic Con on October 7, 2016, where Gregg, Bennet and Luna promoted the series. The episode later aired in the United States on ABC on October 11. It began streaming on Netflix, along with the rest of the fourth season, on June 15, 2017.

== Reception ==
=== Ratings ===
In the United States the episode received a 0.9/3 percent share among adults between the ages of 18 and 49, meaning that it was seen by 0.9 percent of all households, and 3 percent of all of those watching television at the time of the broadcast. It was watched by 2.68 million viewers. Within a week of its release, "Uprising" had been watched by 4.89 million U.S. viewers, above the season average of 4.22 million.

=== Critical response ===
Scott Meslow at Vulture scored the episode 4 stars out of 5, saying that "like a good stock portfolio, the key to a good Agents of S.H.I.E.L.D. is diversification. The best thing about ["Uprising"] isn't any individual story. It's how deftly the show juggles so many stories without losing track of any." He felt the character of Maria was "cartoonishly one note ... [but] it's heartbreaking to watch Yo-Yo stand quietly as her friends unknowingly denounce her", and compared the use of Yo-Yo's powers to "a small-screen version of that great Quicksilver scene from X-Men: Days of Future Past ... it's still pretty cool". Alex McLevy of The A.V. Club graded the episode a "B+", feeling the action-heavy episode was a strong follow up to the more dialogue-focused "Meet the New Boss", and praising Martens direction and the episode's fight choreography. He particularly highlighted the fight sequence where an EMP creates a strobe effect. Evan Valentine at Collider rated the episode a "good" 3 stars out of 5, calling it a solid episode and highlighting the chemistry between the series' cast and the episode's fight sequences and visual effects, which he felt were "a nice and breezy combination of the show's strengths".

IGN's Terri Schwartz gave the episode a "good" 7.8 out of 10, calling the blackout plot "fairly throwaway" but a backdrop to "tell far more interesting stories", with Luna's Reyes continuing to be the strongest new element of the season. Schwartz criticized the episode's killing and resurrection of May as "one of the weaker storytelling tricks in an otherwise solid episode—and as expected, May came back and is just fine." Writing for Nerdist, Joseph McCabe had mixed feelings about the episode's political angle and the use of Inhumans as a stand-in for minorities, but praised the chemistry between Coulson, Mack, and Fitz, and the further exploration of Jeffrey Mace. McCabe was highly critical of guest star Lorenzo James Henrie, calling him "no more charismatic here than he was in Fear the Walking Dead, and his character is every bit as unsympathetic as his misguided rebel was on that show, wheelchair or no." Kevin Fitzpatrick of ScreenCrush was particularly negative, feeling the episodes' different storylines "ended up feeling like three disparate stories with some notable reaching'. He felt the Inhuman prejudice storyline and attack by looters on Gabe were forced, and that the May storyline did not "really [advance] our idea of where the AI or ghostly threads will end up". Fitzpatrick did think that the introduction of Nagra would "help Season 4 find its footing again" with a more focused overarching story.

Several critics felt that events in the episode—particularly the terrorist-caused blackouts in major cities around the world, and the public relegitimization of S.H.I.E.L.D.—were problematic due to the series' connection to the Marvel Cinematic Universe. Meslow felt it was questionable for the series to feature a crisis such as the blackouts, given they "would surely attract the attention of at least one Avenger". Valentine felt that the S.H.I.E.L.D. announcement would fall alongside other events on the series that "will never be reflected in the [MCU] movies ... it does sometimes make you aggravated when the series can go for such broad strokes to the universe without any mention in the movies themselves". Fitzpatrick concurred with Valentine, saying the announcement will "never, ever be acknowledged by any other Marvel property."
