= José Zúñiga (actor) =

Honduran actor (born 1965)

- Born: April 1, 1965 (age 61); Tegucigalpa, Honduras
- Occupation: Actor
- Years active: 1991–present
- Spouse: Laura Levine (m. 1991)
- Children: 1

José Zúñiga (born April 1, 1965) is a Honduran American actor.

== Filmography ==
=== Film ===
Year	Title	Role	Notes
1993	Alive	Fraga the Mechanic	
1993	The Good Policeman	Dariel Cortez	TV movie
1994	Fresh Kill	Miguel Flores	
1994	Fresh	Lieutenant Perez	
1994	Crooklyn	Tommy 'La-La'	
1994	The Cowboy Way	Carlos	
1994	Nadja	Bartender	
1995	Smoke	Jerry, OTB Man	
1995	Blue in the Face	Jerry	
1995	Stonewall	Randy	
1995	Flirt	Cab Driver	
1995	Money Train	Victor	
1996	For Which He Stands	Jose	
1996	Striptease	Chris Rojo	
1996	Ransom	David Torres	
1996	Day of the Warrior	Mexican Cop	
1997	Hurricane Streets	Kramer	
1997	Con Air	DEA Agent Willie Sims	
1998	Next Stop Wonderland	Andre De Silva	
2000	Happy Accidents	Jose	
2000	Gun Shy	Fidel Vaillar	
2000	The Opportunists	Jesus Del Toro	
2000	The Crew	Escobar	
2000	For Love or Country: The Arturo Sandoval Story	Paquito D'Rivera	TV movie
2001	Snow White: The Fairest of Them All	Hector	TV movie
2003	The Hunted	FBI Agent Bobby Moret	
2005	Constantine	Detective Weiss	
2006	The Alibi	Officer Sykes	
2006	Mission: Impossible III	IMF Agent Pete	
2006	Undoing	Randall	
2007	Tortilla Heaven	Isidor	
2007	Next	Security Chief Roybal	
2008	The Tree	Spano	Short
2008	Twilight	Mr. Molina	
2010	Smell the Coffee	Ricky	Short
2011	The Chaperone	Carlos	
2012	Eye of the Hurricane	Roberto Cruz	
2012	The Forger	Mr. Weathers	
2013	The Call	Marco	
2013	The Alter Life	Boss	Short
2014	Mary Loss of Soul	Victor Solis	
2015	Diablo	Guillermo	
2015	Victor	Manuel Torres	
2016	The Duel	General Calderon	
2016	Todos Bailaban	Mr. Martinez	Short
2017	The Most Hated Woman in America	Detective Campos	
2017	A Place in the Caribbean	Gael Castillo	
2017	The Dark Tower	Dr. Hotchkiss	
2018	Baja	Luis Bolanos	
2019	Against the Clock	Ah Puch	
2020	Half Brothers	Evaristo	
2021	Reefa	Israel Sr.	
2021	Electro Magnetic	Tomas	Short
2023	Sound of Freedom	Roberto	
2025	The Life List	Samuel	
2025	Rosario	Oscar	
2027	Alone at Dawn †		Post-production
TBA	1972 †		Post-production

=== Television ===
Year	Title	Role	Notes
1992	Law & Order	Rudy Amendariz	Episode: "Wedded Bliss"
1994	NYPD Blue	Bobby Ruiz	Episode: "You Bet Your Life"
1995	The Cosby Mysteries	Espinosa Spinoza	Recurring Cast
1994–96	New York Undercover	Jimmy Torres	Recurring Cast: Season 1–2
1996–97	Mad About You	Arturo the Hairdresser	Guest Cast: Season 1–2
1997	Prince Street	-	Episode: "Pilot"
1997–98	Nothing Sacred	Juan Alberto "J.A." Ortiz	Main Cast
1998	Sins of the City	Freddie Corillo	Recurring Cast
1998	Law & Order	Detective Mark Rivera	Episode: "Bait"
2000	Get Real	Dr. Carroll	Episode: "Waiting"
2001–02	That's Life	Ray Orozco	Recurring Cast: Season 2
2001–04	Law & Order: Special Victims Unit	TARU Technician Miguel Cruz	Guest: Season 3, Recurring: Season 5
2002	Crossing Jordan	George Cortinez	Episode: "Blood Relatives"
2002	Touched by an Angel	Oscar	Episode: "The Christmas Watch"
2003	Dragnet	Review Board Investigator #2	Episode: "The Little Guy"
2003	Karen Sisco	Julio	Episode: "Dear Derwood"
2003	CSI: Miami	Carl Galaz	Episode: "Simple Man"
2004	Century City	Attorney Randall Purgaman	Recurring Cast
2004	ER	Eduardo Lopez	Guest Cast: Season 10–11
2004	Law & Order	Christoff	Episode: "Cry Wolf"
2004–10	CSI: Crime Scene Investigation	Chris Cavaliere	Guest: Seasons 4, 6, 10; Recurring: Seasons 5, 9
2005	Alias	Roberto Fox	Episode: "The Orphan"
2005	The Shield	Gino	Recurring Cast: Season 4
2005	Bones	Mickey Santana	Recurring Cast: Season 1
2006	24	Joseph Malina	Episode: "Day 5: 4:00 a.m.-5:00 a.m."
2006	Dexter	Jorge Castillo	Episode: "Love American Style"
2006	Law & Order	Detective Borough Investigator	Episode: "In Vino Veritas"
2006	Prison Break	Coyote	Recurring Cast: Season 2
2006–07	The O.C.	Jason Spitz	Guest: Season 3, Recurring Cast: Season 4
2007	Numb3rs	Bernardo Infante	Episode: "Take Out"
2007	Justice	Detective Mendoza	Episode: "False Confession"
2007	NCIS	Dr. Adrian De La Casa	Episode: "Corporal Punishment"
2007	Saving Grace	Ronnie	Recurring Cast: Season 1
2008	CSI: Miami	Juan Ortega	Guest Cast: Season 6–7
2008–10	Ghost Whisperer	Officer Reed Simonds/Luis Simon	Guest: Season 3, Recurring: Season 5
2009	Grey's Anatomy	Anthony Meloy	Episode: "Sweet Surrender"
2009	Medium	Oswaldo Castillo	Episode: "Bring Me the Head of Oswaldo Castillo"
2009	Dark Blue	Agent Boyle	Episode: "Pilot"
2009	Lie to Me	Detective Molina	Episode: "Control Factor"
2009	Nip/Tuck	Detective Cyrus	Episode: "Abigail Sullivan"
2010	Castle	Alfredo Quintana	Episode: "Suicide Squeeze"
2010	Law & Order: Criminal Intent	Senator Victor Caldera	Episode: "True Legacy"
2010	Childrens Hospital	Gang Boss	Episode: "The Coffee Machine Paid for Itself"
2011	Off the Map	Julio	Recurring Cast
2011	The Chicago Code	Daniel Romero	Episode: "Black Hand and the Shotgun Man"
2011	Suits	Harry the Cab Driver	Episode: "Bail Out"
2011	The Event	Carlos Geller	Recurring Cast
2011	A Gifted Man	Richard Flores	Episode: "In Case of Memory Loss"
2012	Person of Interest	Vargas	Episode: "Blue Code"
2012	House	Nate Weinmann	Episode: "Man of the House"
2012	Desperate Housewives	Detective Heredia	Recurring Cast: Season 8
2012	Scandal	General Benicio Florez	Episode: "Enemy of the State"
2012	Harry's Law	Attorney Hector Walsh	Episode: "And the Band Played On"
2012	666 Park Avenue	Commissioner Pike	Episode: "Hero Complex"
2012	Burn Notice	Vasquez	Episode: "Desperate Measures"
2013	Body of Proof	Roberto Franco	Episode: "Dark City"
2014	Taxi Brooklyn	Detective Eddie Esposito	Main Cast
2014	The Last Ship	El Toro	Episode: "El Toro"
2014	Scorpion	Lou Rake	Episode: "Shorthanded"
2015	How to Get Away with Murder	Jorge Castillo	Episode: "Best Christmas Ever"
2015	The Night Shift	Frank	Episode: "Parenthood"
2015	Criminal Minds	Al Eisenmund	Episode: "The Job"
2015	The Player	The Secretary of ...	Episode: "Ante Up"
2015	Code Black	Chef Holder	Episode: "Sometimes It's a Zebra"
2016	From Dusk till Dawn: The Series	Emilio	Episode: "Head Games"
2016	Better Things	Henry	Recurring Cast: Season 1
2016	Agents of S.H.I.E.L.D.	Eli Morrow	Recurring Cast: Season 4
2016	Notorious	Raul Mora	Episode: "Taken"
2016–17	Shooter	Simon Porter	Episode: "Sometimes It's a Zebra"
2016–19	Madam Secretary	Vice President Carlos Morejon	Guest: Season 2, Recurring: Seasons 4–6
2017	Snowfall	Ramiro	Recurring Cast: Season 1
2018	The Assassination of Gianni Versace	Detective George Navarro	Recurring Cast
2018	The Blacklist	Gonzalez	Episode: "Lawrence Dane Devlin (No. 26)"
2018	New Amsterdam	Louis 'Lou' Navarro	Episode: "Cavitation"
2018	The Rookie	Nestor Garcia	Episode: "The Switch"
2019	For the People	Randy Stanton	Episode: "You Belong Here"
2019	Hawaii Five-0	Flores	Episode: "Hewa ka lima"
2020–21	The Expanse	Carlos "Bull" de Baca	Recurring Cast: Season 5
2021	Narcos: Mexico	Jesus Gutierrez Rebollo	Recurring Cast: Season 3
2022	Chicago P.D.	Javier Escano	Recurring Cast: Season 9
2022	Westworld	Vice President	Episode: "Well Enough Alone"
2022	Quantum Leap	Commander Jim Reynolds	Episode: "Atlantis"
2023	True Lies	General Hernan Alvaro Ochoa	Episode: "Friendly Enemies"
2023	Physical	Carlos	Recurring Cast: Season 3
2024	Griselda	Amilcar	Recurring Cast
2024	Accused	Detective Serrano	Episode: "Lorraine's Story"
