= Joseph McCabe (editor) =

Journalist and editor

Joseph McCabe (born June 28, 1972) is a journalist and editor.

Much of McCabe's work has been in the fields of science fiction, fantasy and horror. McCabe is notable for writing a book of interviews with Neil Gaiman and his associates entitled, Hanging Out With the Dream King: Conversations with Neil Gaiman and His Collaborators. The book was nominated for the Bram Stoker Award for Best Non-Fiction and the International Horror Guild Award in 2004.

He has also served as an assistant editor for Weird Tales, a contributing editor for Comic Book Artist magazine, the associate editor of FEARnet.com, the official website of FEARnet, the west coast editor of SFX magazine, a reporter and critic for Nerdist.com and Total Film, and the founding editor-in-chief of the DC Universe (streaming service) website. His books 100 Things Superman Fans Should Know & Do Before They Die and 100 Things Batman Fans Should Know & Do Before They Die were published in 2016 and 2017 by Triumph Books.
