= 2017 Movieguide Awards =

Annual American movie and television awards

The 2017 Movieguide Awards ceremony honored the best films and television of 2016.

== Winners and nominees ==
Winners are listed first, highlighted in boldface, and indicated with a double dagger (‡).

**Epiphany Prize for Most Inspiring Movie** - Honoring movies that are wholesome, spiritually uplifting and inspirational	**Epiphany Prize for Most Inspiring TV Program**
**The Young Messiah**‡; Ben-Hur; God's Not Dead 2; Hacksaw Ridge; Hail, Caesar!; Miracles from Heaven; Risen; Silence	**Dolly Parton's Christmas of Many Colors: Circle of Love**‡; Agents of S.H.I.E.L.D.: Episodes 3.20-22: "Emancipation", "Absolution", and "Ascension"; Karen Kingsbury's The Bridge Part 2; Operation Christmas; The Passion: New Orleans; Pocahontas: Dove of Peace; Karen Kingsbury's A Time to Dance
**Faith and Freedom Award for Movies** - Honoring movies that promote positive American values	**Faith and Freedom Award for TV**
**Hacksaw Ridge**‡; Captain America: Civil War; God's Not Dead 2; Hail, Caesar!; Queen of Katwe; Sing; Sully	**Operation Christmas**‡; Pocahontas: Dove of Peace; Karen Kingsbury's The Bridge Part 2; Dolly Parton's Christmas of Many Colors: Circle of Love; The Passion: New Orleans; Agents of S.H.I.E.L.D.: Episodes 3.20-22: "Emancipation", "Absolution", and "Ascension"
**Best Movie for Families**	**Best Movie for Mature Audiences**
**Miracles from Heaven**‡; Finding Dory; The Jungle Book; Pete's Dragon; Queen of Katwe; The Secret Life of Pets; Sing; Trolls; The Young Messiah; Zootopia	**God's Not Dead 2**‡; Ben-Hur; Captain America: Civil War; Eddie the Eagle; The Finest Hours; Hacksaw Ridge; Hail, Caesar!; Risen; Silence; Sully
**Grace Award for Most Inspiring Performance for Movies, Actor**	**Grace Award for Most Inspiring Performance for TV, Actor**
**Adam Greaves-Neal - The Young Messiah**‡; Rodrigo Santoro - Ben-Hur; David A.R. White - God's Not Dead 2; Andrew Garfield - Hacksaw Ridge; Josh Brolin - Hail, Caesar!; Robert Pike Daniel - Hail, Caesar!; Cliff Curtis - Risen; Joseph Fiennes - Risen	**Devielle Johnson - Karen Kingsbury's A Time to Dance**‡; Ted McGinley - Karen Kingsbury's The Bridge Part 2; Gerald McRaney - Dolly Parton's Christmas of Many Colors: Circle of Love; Tyler Perry - The Passion: New Orleans
**Grace Award for Most Inspiring Performance for Movies, Actress**	**Grace Award for Most Inspiring Performance for TV, Actress**
**Melissa Joan Hart - God's Not Dead 2**‡; Jennifer Garner - Miracles from Heaven; Kylie Rogers - Miracles from Heaven	**Faith Ford - Karen Kingsbury's The Bridge Part 2**‡; Natalia Cordova-Buckley - Agents of S.H.I.E.L.D.: Episodes 3.20-22: "Emancipation", "Absolution", and "Ascension"; Alyvia Alyn Lind - Dolly Parton's Christmas of Many Colors: Circle of Love; Dolly Parton - Dolly Parton's Christmas of Many Colors: Circle of Love
