= Agents of S.H.I.E.L.D.: Slingshot =

2016 web series

- Genre: Action; Adventure; Drama; Science fiction; Superhero
- Based on: S.H.I.E.L.D. by; Stan Lee; Jack Kirby; Yo-Yo Rodriguez by; Brian Michael Bendis; Alex Maleev
- Starring: Clark Gregg; Chloe Bennet; Natalia Cordova-Buckley; Jason O'Mara; Ming-Na Wen; Iain De Caestecker; Elizabeth Henstridge; Henry Simmons
- Composer: Bear McCreary
- Country of origin: United States
- Original language: English
- No. of seasons: 1
- No. of episodes: 6

Production
- Executive producers: Joss Whedon; Maurissa Tancharoen; Jed Whedon; Jeffrey Bell; Jeph Loeb; Geoffrey Colo; Alan Fine; Stan Lee; Joe Quesada; Jim Chory
- Producers: Bob Kozicki; Chris Cheramie
- Production location: Los Angeles
- Cinematography: Kyle Jewell
- Editors: Jennifer Macfarlane; Michael Benni Pierce
- Running time: 3–6 minutes
- Production companies: ABC Studios; Marvel Television

Original release
- Network: ABC.com
- Release: December 13, 2016

Related
- Agents of S.H.I.E.L.D.

Marvel's Agents of S.H.I.E.L.D.: Slingshot is an American digital series created for ABC.com, based on the Marvel Comics organization S.H.I.E.L.D. and the character Yo-Yo Rodriguez. It is set in the Marvel Cinematic Universe (MCU) and acknowledges the continuity of the franchise's films and other television series; it is a supplement to Agents of S.H.I.E.L.D. The series is produced by ABC Studios and Marvel Television, with executive producer Geoffrey Colo leading the series' crew.

The series follows Elena "Yo-Yo" Rodriguez on a mission before the events of the fourth season of Agents of S.H.I.E.L.D. Natalia Cordova-Buckley reprises her role as Rodriguez from Agents of S.H.I.E.L.D., along with Clark Gregg, Chloe Bennet, Jason O'Mara, Ming-Na Wen, Iain De Caestecker, Elizabeth Henstridge and Henry Simmons. Slingshot was revealed at the end of the Agents of S.H.I.E.L.D. episode "The Laws of Inferno Dynamics" in December 2016, with members of the main series' production team also working on the spin-off.

All six episodes of Agents of S.H.I.E.L.D.: Slingshot were released on December 13, 2016. It received a positive critical response, and won a Webby Award, along with nominations for a Primetime Emmy Award, a Streamy Award, and two Writers Guild of America Awards.

== Premise ==
Elena "Yo-Yo" Rodriguez is forced to sign the Sokovia Accords by S.H.I.E.L.D. (Strategic Homeland Intervention, Enforcement, and Logistics Division) because she is an Inhuman. This creates a conflict with a personal mission she is looking to complete.

== Cast and characters ==
=== Main ===
- Clark Gregg as Phil Coulson: An agent and former director of S.H.I.E.L.D.
- Chloe Bennet as Daisy Johnson / Quake: A former agent of S.H.I.E.L.D. She is an Inhuman with earthquake-generating abilities.
- Natalia Cordova-Buckley as Elena "Yo-Yo" Rodriguez:
  A Colombian Inhuman who can move at super speed for a beat of her heart, before returning to the point she started moving from. She is an asset to S.H.I.E.L.D. Cordova-Buckley said the series explores how Rodriguez feels about her abilities and "with whom to use them and with whom to team up or not." She added, "We see Yo-Yo begin that conflict of whether she wants to belong to S.H.I.E.L.D. or not. I think at some point we've seen all the [S.H.I.E.L.D.] characters have doubts about the bureaucracy and the power struggle of S.H.I.E.L.D., but I think Yo-Yo's the one that the struggle is the most evident." Marvel Entertainment COO Joe Quesada described the series as an adventure that defines Rodriguez "and how she goes about doing her business as an Inhuman." The spin-off was the first time Cordova-Buckley led a series, which helped her learn to build a character.
- Jason O'Mara as Jeffrey Mace: The new Director of S.H.I.E.L.D., an Inhuman with super-strength and durability.
- Ming-Na Wen as Melinda May: An agent of S.H.I.E.L.D.
- Iain De Caestecker as Leo Fitz: An agent of S.H.I.E.L.D. who is an engineering and weapons technology specialist.
- Elizabeth Henstridge as Jemma Simmons: An agent of S.H.I.E.L.D. who is a biochemist specialist.
- Henry Simmons as Alphonso "Mack" Mackenzie: An agent of S.H.I.E.L.D. who is attracted to Rodriguez.

=== Recurring and guest ===
- Yancey Arias as Victor Ramon: A former National Police of Colombia member-turned-arms dealer who killed Rodriguez's cousin.
- Alexander Wraith as Anderson: An agent of S.H.I.E.L.D.
- Deren Tadlock as Cecilio: An agent of S.H.I.E.L.D.
- Matt Berberi and Hiroo Minami as Ramon's henchman.
- Dale Pavinski as Alpha Dog: A member of the Watchdogs terrorist organization.

Stan Lee cameos through an on-set photograph.

== Episodes ==
No.	Title	Directed by	Written by	Original release date
1	"Vendetta"	Joe Quesada	James C. Oliver & Sharla Oliver	December 13, 2016
Elena Rodriguez and Daisy Johnson discuss a secret mission they shared while Johnson went rogue from S.H.I.E.L.D. Now that Johnson has returned, Rodriguez wants to make sure their stories are consistent to throw off Director Jeffrey Mace. On that mission, Rodriguez met with Phil Coulson after he stepped down as director of S.H.I.E.L.D. Rodriguez was contemplating signing the Sokovia Accords while also hoping to seek out Victor Ramon, the man responsible for her cousin's death.
2	"John Hancock"	Feliks Parnell	James C. Oliver & Sharla Oliver	December 13, 2016
Director Mace sets a meeting with Rodriguez to have her sign the Sokovia Accords. As she does, he tells her that under the agreement of the Sokovia Accords, she has to follow a certain procedure before going after Ramon. Unsatisfied, Rodriguez steals Mace's S.H.I.E.L.D. access card to help her get more information on Ramon.
3	"Progress"	Keith Potter	George Kitson	December 13, 2016
Leo Fitz and Jemma Simmons examine Rodriguez, and she secretly learns Ramon is in Baltimore, Maryland. She runs into Alphonso "Mack" Mackenzie, who is on a mission with Coulson to track down Johnson. As Coulson and Mack's Quinjet takes off, Melinda May informs Rodriguez that Mace's credentials are missing. Rodriguez realizes that May knows she took them.
4	"Reunion"	Chris Cheramie	Iden Baghdadchi	December 13, 2016
Rodriguez reluctantly returns Mace's access card to May, who advises Rodriguez to be mindful of her "sloppy" work. May grants Rodriguez access to another Quinjet headed to Baltimore. Rodriguez finds Ramon and botches his plans to leave the city. She reminds him that he is responsible for her cousin's murder, but one of his henchmen knocks her out.
5	"Deal Breaker"	John P. Gordon	Iden Baghdadchi & Mark Leitner	December 13, 2016
Held captive by Ramon, Rodriguez realizes that he is attempting to sell a weapon to members of the terrorist organization called the Watchdogs. Rodriguez is rescued by Johnson, who had come for the weapon, and holds off the Watchdogs' attacks to allow Rodriguez to go after Ramon, who had tried to escape.
6	"Justicia"	Mark Kolpack	Mark Leitner	December 13, 2016
Rodriguez chooses not to kill Ramon, who is inadvertently vaporized by the weapon as S.H.I.E.L.D. arrives, ending the mission. In the present, Rodriguez and Johnson agree on their story, and Johnson erases any trace in S.H.I.E.L.D.'s system that Rodriguez was in Baltimore.

== Production ==
=== Development ===
Natalia Cordova-Buckley revealed on December 5, 2016, that a surprise teaser would air the next day following "The Laws of Inferno Dynamics", the mid-season finale of Agents of S.H.I.E.L.D.'s fourth season. The teaser revealed Agents of S.H.I.E.L.D.: Slingshot, a 6-part digital series following Cordova-Buckley's S.H.I.E.L.D. character Elena "Yo-Yo" Rodriguez. Produced by ABC Studios and Marvel Television, each episode of the series is 3–6 minutes long. Maurissa Tancharoen, Jed Whedon, Jeffrey Bell, Jeph Loeb and Geoffrey Colo are executive producers on the series, with Colo described as the "mastermind behind" Slingshot. Colo said ABC and Marvel had been "looking for a while to do a digital series connected to Marvel's Agents of S.H.I.E.L.D. The trick was finding something that fit snugly into S.H.I.E.L.D.'s timeline and the greater MCU".

=== Casting ===
Cordova-Buckley was cast as Rodriguez in February 2016 for the third season of Agents of S.H.I.E.L.D., and was revealed to be starring in Slingshot with the December 2016 announcement. She is joined by other Agents of S.H.I.E.L.D. cast members Clark Gregg as Phil Coulson, Jason O'Mara as Jeffrey Mace, Henry Simmons as Alphonso "Mack" Mackenzie, Chloe Bennet as Daisy Johnson / Quake, Ming-Na Wen as Melinda May, Iain De Caestecker as Leo Fitz, and Elizabeth Henstridge as Jemma Simmons.

Yancey Arias recurs as arms dealer Victor Ramon, reprising his role from the Agents of S.H.I.E.L.D. episode "Bouncing Back". Also reprising their roles from S.H.I.E.L.D. are Alexander Wraith and Deren Tadlock as S.H.I.E.L.D. agents Anderson and Cecilio, and Dale Pavinski as the "Alpha Dog" of the Watchdogs.

=== Filming and visual effects ===
One of Joe Quesada's storyboards for "Vendetta", highlighting his comic book-like approach to planning the episode's filming

Marvel Comics CCO Joe Quesada, who made his directorial debut with the first episode, created detailed storyboards of the episode like he would with a comic, stating, "The same rules of storytelling, whether its film or television, apply directly to comic books when you do it right." Much of the same crew that works on the main S.H.I.E.L.D. series also worked on Slingshot, including visual effects supervisor Mark Kolpack who returned to supervise the effects for Slingshot. Kolpack also directed the final episode of the spin-off.

=== Marvel Cinematic Universe tie-ins ===
The majority of the digital series takes place shortly before the events of the fourth season of Agents of S.H.I.E.L.D., which Quesada said would allow the series to tell the story "that is in between the cracks" and explore "missing time" since the end of Agents of S.H.I.E.L.D. season three. Cordova-Buckley added that Slingshot would help viewers "understand the reasoning for many of the decisions that characters make in Season 4," gaining "more of an overall answer of the 'why's'." Such insights include "the struggle between Yo-Yo and Mack, ... the closeness between Daisy and Yo-Yo, ... [and] the relationship between Yo-Yo and S.H.I.E.L.D." from her interactions with Mace and Coulson. In addition, Peggy Carter, Secretary Thaddeus Ross, and his prison The Raft are referenced.

== Release ==
All six episodes of Agents of S.H.I.E.L.D.: Slingshot debuted on ABC.com on December 13, 2016. The episodes were also available on ABC's mobile app, Marvel.com, and ABC and Marvel's YouTube channels.

== Reception ==
=== Critical response ===
Christina Roberts of Culturess felt Slingshot was "a cool premise" that built off established Agents of S.H.I.E.L.D. characters and expanded on those less used. Roberts also felt Slingshot could have worked as a standalone episode of the main series since those episodes are "always a nice breath of fresh air", and was curious if Slingshot would be referenced in Agents of S.H.I.E.L.D., "even if it's just a wink and a nod between Daisy and Elena." Geek Exchange's Georgia Ringelberg called Slingshot "unnecessary because the plot doesn't add anything to the larger series". Despite this, it was "a fun, quick watch that's perfect for getting through the mid-season break". Additionally, Ringelberg felt the use of Rodriguez in the series gave the character "some well-deserved attention" and would lead "to more screen time" including "maybe even preparing viewers for the Inhumans series... If they transition her to Inhumans or give her time on both shows, she could be strategically utilized instead of mostly forgotten the way she is now."

=== Accolades ===
Awards and nominations for Agents of S.H.I.E.L.D.: Slingshot
Year	Award	Category	Nominee(s)	Result	Ref.
2017	Webby Awards	Webby. Drama: Long Form or Series	Agents of S.H.I.E.L.D.: Slingshot	Won	
2017	Webby Awards	People's Voice. Drama: Long Form or Series	Agents of S.H.I.E.L.D.: Slingshot	Won	
2017	Primetime Creative Arts Emmy Awards	Outstanding Short Form Comedy or Drama Series	Agents of S.H.I.E.L.D.: Slingshot	Nominated	
2017	Streamy Awards	Costume Design	Ann Foley	Nominated	
2017	Writers Guild of America Awards	Short Form New Media – Adapted	"John Hancock"	Nominated	
2017	Writers Guild of America Awards	Short Form New Media – Adapted	"Justicia"	Nominated	
