= The Ghost (Agents of S.H.I.E.L.D.) =

- Agents of S.H.I.E.L.D. episode
- Promotion for the episode focused on the introduction of Ghost Rider, who was created through both practical and digital effects.
- Episode no.: Season 4 Episode 1
- Directed by: Billy Gierhart
- Written by: Jed Whedon; Maurissa Tancharoen
- Cinematography by: Feliks Parnell
- Editing by: Eric Litman
- Original air date: September 20, 2016
- Running time: 43 minutes

Guest appearances
- Gabriel Luna as Robbie Reyes / Ghost Rider; Natalia Cordova-Buckley as Elena "Yo-Yo" Rodriguez; Lorenzo James Henrie as Gabe Reyes; Mallory Jansen as Aida; Lilli Birdsell as Lucy

Episode chronology
← Previous "Ascension"	Next → "Meet the New Boss"
- Agents of S.H.I.E.L.D. season 4

"The Ghost" is the first episode of the fourth season of the American television series Agents of S.H.I.E.L.D. Based on the Marvel Comics organization S.H.I.E.L.D., it follows Phil Coulson and his fellow S.H.I.E.L.D. agents as they deal with the enhanced individuals Quake and Ghost Rider. It is set in the Marvel Cinematic Universe (MCU) and acknowledges the franchise's films. The episode was written by showrunners Jed Whedon and Maurissa Tancharoen, and directed by Billy Gierhart.

Clark Gregg reprises his role as Coulson from the film series, starring alongside Ming-Na Wen, Chloe Bennet, Iain De Caestecker, Elizabeth Henstridge, Henry Simmons, and John Hannah. A fourth season was ordered in March 2016, with Gabriel Luna introduced as Ghost Rider, a character created through both practical and visual effects. He was included as part of the series exploring supernatural elements ahead of the release of the MCU film Doctor Strange (2016). Mallory Jansen and Lilli Birdsell are also introduced as recurring characters for the season. The episode begins the season's first "pod" of eight episodes, subtitled Ghost Rider.

"The Ghost" originally aired on ABC on September 20, 2016, at the later time of 10:00 pm which allowed it to be darker and more mature than previous seasons. The episode was watched by 6.24 million viewers within a week, and received mostly positive reviews due to its new status quo and the introduction of Ghost Rider. The opening scene received criticism for sexualizing Bennet.

== Plot ==
Former S.H.I.E.L.D. agent Daisy Johnson, now the vigilante "Quake", is hunting gang affiliates of the anti-Inhuman terrorist group Watchdogs in Los Angeles when members of the Aryan Brotherhood are murdered by the fiery "Ghost Rider" in front of her. Agents Phil Coulson and Alphonso "Mack" Mackenzie, who were forbidden from searching for Johnson by the new Director of S.H.I.E.L.D, are tipped off to her location by Agent Melinda May. They fly to Los Angeles under the guise of checking in on Inhuman asset Elena "Yo-Yo" Rodriguez, who has signed the controversial Sokovia Accords and is now under the jurisdiction of S.H.I.E.L.D. and the United Nations.

Agent Leo Fitz visits friend and S.H.I.E.L.D. ally Holden Radcliffe, a transhumanist doctor who is on probation after previous illegal experimentation. Fitz discovers that Radcliffe has secretly transferred his artificial intelligence AIDA into a human-like body, which he intends to be the first in a line of decoys for field agents in danger. Believing Radcliffe's altruistic intentions, Fitz agrees to help him perfect Aida, and to keep her a secret from his girlfriend Agent Jemma Simmons, who is in the paranoid Director's inner circle, and takes daily lie-detector tests. Simmons realizes that Coulson and Mack are investigating Johnson, and orders May to stop them; May and her new strike force arrive to find Coulson and Mack surveilling Chinese gangsters, who they believe are potential targets of Quake.

The gangsters have bought a weapon off the Brotherhood which can help them fight against Inhumans. They open the box containing the weapon, and unleash a mystical being who turns the gangsters berserk. She secretly infects May as well, as the strike force takes out the gangsters. Johnson meets with Rodriguez, who stole medication from S.H.I.E.L.D. during their brief check with her which can help Johnson heal—her recent over use of her Inhuman abilities as Quake has been fracturing her bones. Johnson then tracks down the Ghost Rider and confronts it, but it defeats her, explaining that it only murders people that deserve to die. She thinks this should include her, but it refuses to kill her. She later sees the Ghost Rider's human form, Robbie Reyes, looking after his disabled brother Gabe.

== Production ==
=== Development ===
The series was renewed for a fourth season on March 3, 2016, to air at the later time of 10:00 pm. At the 2016 San Diego Comic-Con it was revealed that the series would be adapting the character of Robbie Reyes / Ghost Rider. In September 2016, Marvel announced that the premiere episode of the season would be titled "The Ghost". The episode is written by executive producers Jed Whedon and Maurissa Tancharoen, with Billy Gierhart directing. It serves as the beginning of the season's Ghost Rider "pod" of episodes, which consists of the first eight episodes. "The Ghost" also introduces a new title card for the series.

=== Writing ===
On how much more "mature" the episode is from previous episodes given the later air time, Whedon explained that ABC "haven't really ever given us a note on violence. We've cut people into pieces and hacked them up and shot people point blank in the head. Never got any notes on that. So pushing the envelope for us will be in the sexual nature". This is evidenced by the episode's opening, a "sexy" look at the character Quake getting dressed. Executive producer Jeph Loeb added, "what it does is give us the chance to tell different stories. The idea is some of the material might be more mature, there may be more grit, what we're doing might be darker. It certainly made a lot more sense when we wanted to introduce a character like Ghost Rider into this world."

Discussing Quake's mindset when the episode picks up, actress Chloe Bennet said, "She's not doing well. She's had a rough couple of years. She's taking some time and I think it's kind of her way of protecting the people that she cares about. Everyone she's gotten close to, something bad has happened to them. It's her weird, selfish way of protecting them". This, the character's assertion in the episode to Ghost Rider that she "deserves to die". Concerning the character Fitz keeping the android Aida a secret from his girlfriend Simmons, actor Iain De Caestecker said, "They're trying to maintain a healthy relationship while being secret undercover spies that have secret assignments ... it's with the best intentions, keeping stuff from her, I suppose. It's going to get interesting. Lying is a strong word. I'm just keeping stuff from" her.

=== Casting ===
In August 2016, Marvel confirmed that series regulars for the season would include the returning Clark Gregg as Phil Coulson, Ming-Na Wen as Melinda May, Chloe Bennet as Daisy Johnson / Quake, Iain De Caestecker as Leo Fitz, Elizabeth Henstridge as Jemma Simmons, and Henry Simmons as Alphonso "Mack" Mackenzie. They are joined by John Hannah as Holden Radcliffe, promoted from his third season recurring role.

When Ghost Rider was confirmed to be joining the season at San Diego Comic-Con, after months of speculation, Gabriel Luna was revealed to be cast in the role. Lorenzo James Henrie was later revealed to be cast as his younger brother Gabe Reyes. Shortly after Comic-Con, Lilli Birdsell was revealed to be cast as the mysterious Lucy. In August, Mallory Jansen was cast as the android Aida, whose artificial intelligence was briefly voiced by Amanda Rea during the third-season finale.

In September 2016, Marvel confirmed that Luna, Henrie, Jansen, and Birdsell would guest star in "The Ghost", and that they would be joined by Natalia Cordova-Buckley as Elena "Yo-Yo" Rodriguez, Briana Venskus as Agent Piper, Max Osinski as Agent Red, Ricardo Walker as Agent Prince, Edward Gelhaus as skinhead, Ian Hutton as Blondie, Blaise Miller as lab tech, Samuel Barajas as Felix, Bryan Rasmussen as warehouse manager, Wilson Ramirez as Diego, Jen Kuo Sung as Chen, and Jerry Ying as thug #1. Cordova-Buckley, Venskus, and Osinski reprise their roles from earlier in the series. The thugs introduced as Ghost Rider's victims in the episode's cold open were intended to immediately come across as Nazi-like characters, to imply to the audience that they deserved to be killed by the Ghost Rider.

=== Filming and visual effects ===
Production for the season began on July 21, 2016, in Los Angeles. Filming for "The Ghost" was completed by August 16. The episode's cold open was filmed at Mariachi Plaza over four nights, and introduces Ghost Rider in a recreation of Robbie Reyes' comic introduction: his car, a 1969 Dodge Charger, is hit by a rocket, flips in the air, and lands with its Ghost Rider flames on driving towards some gang members. A CG double of the car was used for several shots in this sequence, while stunt driver Eric Norris drove the physical stunt car, and a third version was used for "beauty" shots. The effect of Ghost Rider and his flaming skull was imitated on set by Luna wearing a hood fitted with flickering lights that could be adjusted to match different temperature fire for different situations. The skull was then produced using CGI, with Luna wearing tracking markers on his face to provide performance-reference for these sequences. Flames were also produced digitally. The series employed 16 Houdini artists to work on the Ghost Rider effects, up from the usual two or three used on the series to that point previously.

=== Marvel Cinematic Universe tie-ins ===
On the mystical weapon released from the box in the episode, Whedon said, "We are introducing a different supernatural element of the MCU, which happens to coincide with the release of Doctor Strange. So that's what's in the box ... something along those lines." On how it will affect May now that she is infected by it, Wen said, "You never want May out of control. You don't want her to be paranoid." Whedon added, "You can assume that what happened to those other people might happen to her. It's not good."

== Marketing ==
Promotion for the season and its premiere focused heavily on Ghost Rider, through promos and viral marketing teasers, with the season promoted as Agents of S.H.I.E.L.D.: Ghost Rider; this was later revealed to be the subtitle for the first "pod" of episodes for the season. The premiere episode was first shown, before its ABC airing, at a special fan screening event held for the season on September 19, 2016, at Pacific Theatres at The Grove in Los Angeles.

== Release ==
"The Ghost" was first aired in the United States on ABC on September 20, 2016. It began streaming on Netflix, along with the rest of the fourth season, on June 15, 2017.

== Reception ==
=== Ratings ===
In the United States the episode received a 1.1/4 percent share among adults between the ages of 18 and 49, meaning that it was seen by 1.1 percent of all households, and 4 percent of all of those watching television at the time of the broadcast. It was watched by 3.44 million viewers. This was down from previous season premieres, but average for the series. Within a week of its release, "The Ghost" had been watched by 6.24 million U.S. viewers, above the season average of 4.22 million.

=== Reception ===
Terri Schwartz of IGN scored the premiere 8 out of 10, indicating a "great" episode, and praising the introduction of Ghost Rider and subsequent darker tone which "will eventually allow [the series] to sit more comfortably beside its corporate cousins over on Netflix". Schwartz was positive about the smaller cast compared to the previous season, which meant that the episode "doesn't feel as overstuffed as it would have", and of Coulson not finding Johnson and asking her to return to S.H.I.E.L.D. straight away after the newly established status quo. Schwartz did feel that there were some "growing pains" with the transition to more mature material, particularly criticizing the "sexy" opening of the episode with Johnson because "S.H.I.E.L.D. has already done a great job establishing Daisy as a sexy character without needing to depict it in this unsubtle way. Hopefully the inclusion of more overt sexuality in the show feels a bit more organic to the show as it continues".

The A.V. Club's Alex McCown-Levy graded the episode a "B", calling it "a standard first episode back, in that it once again does a lot of table-setting, and not always in the most compelling manner". Levy felt that Ghost Rider's introduction was handled well for non-comic fans discovering the character with the show, but that the new positions of the series' main characters were more interesting and should have been focused on more. Kevin Fitzpatrick of ScreenCrush said, "I'm nervous for Season 4 overall, especially if said reinvention doesn't goose the ratings like Marvel and ABC hope, but "The Ghost" is reason enough for some casual optimism." He was positive about the new similarities to the darker series Daredevil, but felt that the series "doesn't have the firmest handle" on Ghost Rider, either "who Reyes himself is in relation to his murderous alter-ego", or in the blend of practical and digital effects—"the finished product isn't seamless just yet". He said, "The junkyard battle with Daisy [and Ghost Rider] was an understandable highlight", and praised the episode's smaller character moments like "the moment of Daisy feeling as though she deserves to lose her life in battle, only for the Rider to silently disagree." Rob Leane at Den of Geek compared the series' new status quo to Red Dwarf VIII and called it and many of the season's storylines being set up as "pretty strong", but "nothing grabbed [his] attention" like the introduction of Ghost Rider, which Leane felt was "a complete slam-dunk". He praised the effects for Ghost Rider and his car, and Luna's performance.

Evan Valentine, writing for Collider, gave the episode a "good" rating of 3 stars out of 5, saying that the series "certainly benefits somewhat from taking a page from" Daredevil and Jessica Jones, highlighting the number of more mature elements in the episode's opening as "a nice introduction that shows you this may not exactly be the same show you've gotten to know over the years." Valentine called Robbie Reyes "satisfactory" and the Ghost Rider "where things really shined"; "ABC pretty much nail the look [of Ghost Rider], and while he's obviously been tweaked to more accurately portray this new interpretation of the Spirit of Vengeance, he looks great in motion all the same ... his car has a particularly cool scene where it transforms mid air and lands in a fiery blast." He called the Ghost Rider vs Quake fight a highlight, and the latter's health issues "an interesting twist". He concluded saying, "the show still has all the flaws and strengths that [it] is known for ... [but] if you're looking to rejoin your favorite agents for another solid romp with the added twist of throwing Ghost Rider into the mix, this one's for you." Marc Buxton, also of Den of Geek, gave the episode 3.5 stars out of 5, calling it "a fun way to kick off the new season". He criticized the Ghost Rider transformation scene as "way too CGI cartoony" and negatively compared it to Grimm, but otherwise said that "Ghost Rider feels right" and much improved over the Nicolas Cage Ghost Rider films. He also criticized the opening shots of Johnson, calling them "misogynistic" and saying, "Seriously Marvel, you're better than that."

In December 2016, Comic Book Resources named "The Ghost" as the 15th best episode of the year among comic book-related television series.
