= Broken Promises (Agents of S.H.I.E.L.D.) =

- Agents of S.H.I.E.L.D. episode
- This episode begins the LMD pod of episodes, including a new "robot circuitry"-based title card for the series.
- Episode no.: Season 4 Episode 9
- Directed by: Garry A. Brown
- Written by: Brent Fletcher
- Cinematography by: Feliks Parnell
- Editing by: Kelly Stuyvesant
- Original air date: January 10, 2017

Guest appearances
- John Pyper-Ferguson as Terrence Shockley; Parminder Nagra as Ellen Nadeer; Natalia Cordova-Buckley as Elena "Yo-Yo" Rodriguez; Mallory Jansen as Aida; Manish Dayal as Vijay Nadeer; Jason O'Mara as Jeffrey Mace

Episode chronology
← Previous "The Laws of Inferno Dynamics"	Next → "The Patriot"
- Agents of S.H.I.E.L.D. season 4

"Broken Promises" is the ninth episode of the fourth season of the American television series Agents of S.H.I.E.L.D. Based on the Marvel Comics organization S.H.I.E.L.D., it follows Phil Coulson and his team of S.H.I.E.L.D. agents as they are attacked by a rogue Life Model Decoy (LMD). It is set in the Marvel Cinematic Universe (MCU) and acknowledges the franchise's films. The episode was written by Brent Fletcher and directed by Garry A. Brown, serving as the first in the second "pod" of episodes for the season, subtitled LMD.

Clark Gregg reprises his role as Coulson from the film series, and is joined by series regulars Ming-Na Wen, Chloe Bennet, Iain De Caestecker, Elizabeth Henstridge, Henry Simmons, and John Hannah. Recurring guest star Mallory Jansen portrays Aida, the LMD that attacks S.H.I.E.L.D. A second version of Aida is also introduced, with Jansen wearing a slightly different costume to highlight the change. Another storyline follows recurring guest star Parminder Nagra as Senator Ellen Nadeer and Manish Dayal as her brother Vijay. For this subplot, Henstridge had to learn a Southern American accent and film a rare action sequence for her character.

"Broken Promises" originally aired on ABC on January 10, 2017, and was watched by 4.66 million viewers within a week of its release according to Nielsen Media Research. Critical response to the episode was mostly positive, with reviewers feeling the episode was a strong beginning to the LMD arc and praising the comedic performances of Simmons and guest star Natalia Cordova-Buckley. However, the Nadeer subplot received mixed responses, with some considering it to be a step back for the series.

== Plot ==
After gaining control of the Darkhold, the Book of Sins, S.H.I.E.L.D. looks to destroy it to keep it from being used for evil. Agent Leo Fitz and Dr. Holden Radcliffe are sent to clear the memory of the android Aida they have built, as she has read the book. However, Aida's reading of the Darkhold's secrets appears to have granted her sentience, she overpowers the pair. She then takes control of S.H.I.E.L.D.'s systems, and attacks the secret facility in search of the book.

Vijay Nadeer recovers at a family home after spending several months inside an Inhuman Terrigen cocoon. He is looked after by his sister, Senator Ellen Nadeer, who is the leader of the Humans First political movement; the siblings have a hatred for aliens after their mother died during an alien attack, and agreed that if either was "infected" and revealed as an Inhuman, the other would kill them. Nadeer orders a group of Watchdogs—anti-Inhuman terrorists she has aligned herself with—to kill her brother. He asks her to spare him, as he has not shown any sign of Inhuman abilities, but when S.H.I.E.L.D. Director Jeffrey Mace arrives with Agents Daisy Johnson and Jemma Simmons after Simmons had helped Vijay escape his cocoon, Vijay exhibits enhanced reflexes. Ellen convinces Vijay to go with her rather than S.H.I.E.L.D., but as they escape in a helicopter, Ellen kills her brother and dumps his body in a lake, where it is enveloped in another Terrigen cocoon.

Agent Phil Coulson gives the location of the Darkhold to Agent Melinda May, who Aida has replaced with a Life Model Decoy—an android replica. From this, Aida finds the book. Fitz is able to take back control of the facility's systems before Aida can escape, and Agent Alphonso "Mack" Mackenzie beheads the android with his ax. Radcliffe later laments about this to a new model of Aida, as he believes the book holds the secret to eternal life and wants it for himself. He had programmed the original Aida's apparent sentience in an attempt to steal the Darkhold, but must now rely on the May LMD to retrieve it for him.

== Production ==
=== Development and writing ===
In December 2016, the mid-season finale episode of Agents of S.H.I.E.L.D., "The Laws of Inferno Dynamics", ended with the android Aida seemingly replacing main character Melinda May with a Life Model Decoy, a replica android. Executive producer Jed Whedon explained that LMDs would be the subject of the season's next "pod" of episodes, subtitled LMD. He also said that the reintegration of Daisy Johnson into S.H.I.E.L.D. would be explored following her vigilante actions in the previous pod, Ghost Rider, and executive producer Maurissa Tancharoen added that at least the first episode of the second pod would deal with the mystery surrounding Senator Ellen Nadeer and her Inhuman brother.

On changing from Ghost Rider to LMD, Whedon explained that the Life Model Decoy technology is "something that we've been wanting to get to, and now we're finally able to get to ... We want everything to feel like its own mini world, and to have its own flavor. So we do think you'll come into the next section [of episodes] and immediately feel like, 'Oh, this is a different kind of story.'" The first episode of the new pod was revealed to be titled "Broken Promises". At the end of the month, Marvel announced that the episode would be written by Brent Fletcher, and directed by series producer Garry A. Brown.

Ahead of the episode's airing, actress Natalia Cordova-Buckley said that the episode would see some "stability" for the characters Alphonso "Mack" Mackenzie and Elena "Yo-Yo" Rodriguez, after the pair begin a relationship in the mid-season finale. Cordova-Buckley noted that actor Henry Simmons and herself are both minorities, and that Rodriguez is an Inhuman character, allowing the series to explore an interracial relationship "based on respect and love" that viewers can "compare to the world we're living in". The episode also introduces a second model of Aida, with actress Mallory Jansen saying that "Aida 2.0" would be programmed by Radcliffe to be more ruthless, and would have to learn from scratch everything the first version had learned during the season. The character's costume is a darker shade of gray than that worn by the original Aida to reflect these changes. The episode features a reference to the film Chopping Mall (1986). Jim Wynorski, the director of Chopping Mall, messaged Fletcher thanking him for referencing the film and sent Fletcher an autographed Blu-ray of the film.

=== Casting ===
In December 2016, Marvel confirmed that main cast members Clark Gregg as Phil Coulson, Ming-Na Wen as Melinda May, Chloe Bennet as Daisy Johnson / Quake, Iain De Caestecker as Leo Fitz, Elizabeth Henstridge as Jemma Simmons, Henry Simmons as Alphonso "Mack" Mackenzie, and John Hannah as Holden Radcliffe would be starring. The guest cast for the episode includes Natalia Cordova-Buckley as Elena "Yo-Yo" Rodriguez, Jason O'Mara as Director Jeffrey Mace, Mallory Jansen as Aida, Parminder Nagra as Senator Ellen Nadeer, John Pyper-Ferguson as Terrence Shockley, Manish Dayal as Vijay Nadeer, Patrick Cavanaugh as Burrows, Blaise Miller as Agent Nathanson, Shari Vasseghi as Sunjna Nadeer and Bryan Keith as Zack Bynum. Cordova-Buckley, O'Mara, Jansen, Nagra, Dayal, Cavanaugh, and Miller reprise their roles from earlier in the series.

=== Filming ===
For the sequence in which Jemma Simmons goes undercover as a Washington, D.C. lobbyist, Henstridge had to use a Southern American accent. The British actress, who had never used any American accent during her career, explained that she used the accent because the episode originally included dialogue that explained her disguise's Southern origins, though they were ultimately cut. To prepare, Henstridge listened "to some recordings during the breaks" in filming. For the ensuing fight sequence, the production had only a short time to film at the "close of a late shoot". For the fight's final stunt, Henstridge had one attempt to smash a fake glass over a stunt man's head, which she felt "turned out OK".

=== Marvel Cinematic Universe tie-ins ===
The backstory of Ellen and Vijay Nadeer, introduced in this episode, revolves around their mother's death during the Chitauri invasion of New York, as seen in the film The Avengers (2012). A short sequence depicting the character's death during the events of the film is shown as a dream Vijay has while recovering from his time in an Inhuman cocoon. A similar storyline to this was featured in the MCU series Jessica Jones (2015-2019), where another antagonistic character's backstory features a loved one dying during the Chitauri invasion.

== Release ==
"Broken Promises" was first aired in the United States on ABC on January 10, 2017. It began streaming on Netflix, along with the rest of the fourth season, on June 15, 2017.

== Reception ==
=== Ratings ===
In the United States the episode received a 0.8/3 percent share among adults between the ages of 18 and 49, meaning that it was seen by 0.8 percent of all households, and 3 percent of all of those watching television at the time of the broadcast. It was watched by 2.72 million viewers. Within a week of its release, "Broken Promises" had been watched by 4.66 million U.S. viewers.

=== Critical response ===
Reviewing the episode for Nerdist, Joseph McCabe said that any doubts he had about the series moving on from the Ghost Rider storyline "are more or less eliminated", feeling that the episode's take on a robotic antagonist was "Avengers: Age of Ultron done right ... where it most obviously improves on the overstuffed second Avengers film is in the humor department, with a running commentary from Mack that references most every killer android movie of the 1980s." McCabe called the Nadeer storyline "the dark heart and soul" of the episode, and praised the series continued confidence in "mirror[ing] real world events" with the hatred shown towards Inhumans. At IGN, Terri Schwartz scored the episode 9 out of 10 for an "amazing" episode, calling the transition from Ghost Rider to LMD smooth, and praising the choice to have humans be the real monsters in the end of the monster-robot episode; Schwartz felt the Nadeer storyline complimented the Aida storyline well, and that the Radcliffe reveal was a smart direction to take the series.

Alex McCown-Levy at The A.V. Club graded the episode a "B+", praising the reveal that Radcliffe was behind Aida's "sentience", which he felt was well supported by the series' development of the character. He also praised the back-and-forth between Mack and Rodriguez as "the best running gag of the episode", and called the Nadeer storyline "surprisingly strong". McCown-Levy accredited the episode's success to Fletcher's writing, saying "both clumsy exposition and subtle character exchanges are handled with aplomb". Marc Buxtom of Den of Geek called the change to LMD "pretty enjoyable", feeling the series "remains the old comfy slipper of the current slate of superhero shows ... Agents Of SHIELD remains consistently fun and steady without ever sparking tonnes of interest or buzz." Buxtom praised Aida as an effective "big bad", and Mack and Rodriguez's storyline as "one of the highlights of the episode", but was critical of the Nadeer storyline. He called the arc "your typical X-Men stand-in stock plot ... after the freshness of the Ghost Rider half of the season, this just feels like a step back.

Collider's Evan Valentine gave "Broken Promises" 3 stars out of 5, indicating a good episode that "doesn't maintain the heights of [the series'] days with Ghost Rider in the driver's seat, but it does manage to remain a solid entry on the airwaves." He felt that the opening scene, in which Aida fixes her own bullet wounds, was an interesting way to "reel" in viewers without the excitement of Ghost Rider, and said his favorite part of the episode was Mack's hatred of robots and constant pop culture references. Valentine was very critical of the Nadeer subplot: he felt that the Watchdogs had been "pretty much played out at this point"; that the Inhuman storyline had become stale after the previous two seasons, and now the "breath of fresh air" that was Ghost Rider is gone; and that the Nadeers' backstory comes across as a repeat given a similar storyline on Marvel's Jessica Jones. Kevin Fitzpatrick, writing for ScreenCrush, said that the episode "got off to the best possible start" given the change to LMD was "obviously less of an immediate hook" than Ghost Rider. He felt the episode overcame cliche by mixing standard set pieces with Mack and Rodriguez's comedy, and by having "as much fun with a killer robot showdown as possible, and then reveal[ing] a more sensibly long-term threat". However, Fitzpatrick criticized the Nadeer storyline as "flat" and dragging the rest of the episode down.

=== Accolades ===
Simmons and Cordova-Buckley were named as honorable mentions for TVLine's "Performer of the Week" for the week of January 9, 2017, for their performances in this episode. The site praised the pair for their comedic performances, keeping the episode "light and lively—and marvelously meta."
