= The Good Samaritan (Agents of S.H.I.E.L.D.) =

- Agents of S.H.I.E.L.D. episode
- The surprise appearance of the character Johnny Blaze / Ghost Rider as part of the origin story for another version of the anti-hero, Robbie Reyes / Ghost Rider, was met with praise and much speculation
- Episode no.: Season 4 Episode 6
- Directed by: Billy Gierhart
- Written by: Jeffrey Bell
- Cinematography by: Allan Westbrook
- Editing by: Kelly Stuyvesant
- Original air date: November 1, 2016
- Running time: 42 minutes

Guest appearances
- Gabriel Luna as Robbie Reyes / Ghost Rider; José Zúñiga as Eli Morrow; Lilli Birdsell as Lucy Bauer; Kerr Smith as Joseph Bauer; Lorenzo James Henrie as Gabe Reyes; Dan Donohue as Frederick; Ward Roberts as Hugo; Usman Ally as Vincent; Jason O'Mara as Jeffrey Mace

Episode chronology
← Previous "Lockup"	Next → "Deals with Our Devils"
- Agents of S.H.I.E.L.D. season 4

"The Good Samaritan" is the sixth episode of the fourth season of the American television series Agents of S.H.I.E.L.D. Based on the Marvel Comics organization S.H.I.E.L.D., it follows Phil Coulson and his team of S.H.I.E.L.D. agents as they race to find Eli Morrow. It is set in the Marvel Cinematic Universe (MCU) and acknowledges the franchise's films. The episode was written by Jeffrey Bell, and directed by Billy Gierhart.

Clark Gregg reprises his role as Coulson from the film series, and is joined by series regulars Ming-Na Wen, Chloe Bennet, Iain De Caestecker, Elizabeth Henstridge, and Henry Simmons. José Zúñiga guest stars as Morrow, while Gabriel Luna portrays his nephew Robbie Reyes / Ghost Rider. The episode is part of the first "pod" of eight episodes for the season, subtitled Ghost Rider, and uses flashbacks to tell the origin story of how Reyes became the Ghost Rider. This included the surprise appearance of the Marvel character Johnny Blaze as the titular "Good Samaritan", introducing him to the MCU. FuseFX was the main visual effects vendor for the episode.

"The Good Samaritan" originally aired on ABC on November 1, 2016, and was watched by 4.57 million viewers within a week of its release. The episode received mostly positive reviews from critics, who praised the handling of the Ghost Rider origin story and the reveal that Morrow is a villain. Many reviewers highlighted the introduction of Johnny Blaze, and the potential ramifications of his appearance for the MCU.

== Plot ==
"Back in the day", scientists Joseph and Lucy Bauer build a machine that can create matter from nothing, violating the first law of thermodynamics. After having some drinks to celebrate, Lucy reveals to their co-worker Eli Morrow that they learned how to do this from a book, the Darkhold. Before long, Joseph is working on a way to create matter himself, and when Morrow calls him insane and attempts to take the book away, Joseph hires a gang to attack Morrow in his car. However, Morrow's nephews Gabe and Robbie Reyes sneak out in his car that night, and it is they that are attacked by the gang, who leave Gabe paralyzed.

In the present, Lucy is in a ghostly state after an experiment on the Darkhold went wrong, and has now kidnapped Morrow to use him to make herself human again. S.H.I.E.L.D. Director Jeffrey Mace boards the S.H.I.E.L.D. plane Zephyr-One that is commanded by agent Phil Coulson, whom Robbie and former agent Daisy Johnson have been working with unbeknownst to Mace. Johnson, Robbie, and Gabe hide from Mace in a special containment module on the bottom of the Zephyr, and Robbie explains the truth to Gabe: the night he was paralyzed, Robbie was killed in the car crash, and was resurrected when a Ghost Rider passed on the Spirit of Vengeance to him.

Mace discovers the fugitives and refuses to let them go or help find Morrow. The Ghost Rider attacks and defeats Mace, only sparing his life because of Gabe's pleading. Coulson convinces Mace that Robbie can be prosecuted later, and that they need to stop Lucy now. When they find Lucy, Robbie destroys her, but not before she reveals that Morrow wanted the Darkhold's power for himself and had intentionally turned her into this ghostly state. Coulson finds Morrow, to see him attempt an experiment on himself. An energy blast from the experiment makes Coulson, Robbie, and agent Leo Fitz disappear, and Morrow successfully displays the ability to create matter.

== Production ==
=== Development ===
At the 2016 San Diego Comic-Con it was revealed that the series would be adapting the character of Robbie Reyes / Ghost Rider during its fourth season, with the first eight episodes making up the opening "pod" of episodes for the season, subtitled Ghost Rider. That October, executive producer Jed Whedon said that the series' use of Reyes and his supporting characters and mythology was "definitely pivoting from the storyline in the comics. We're pulling the characters, the character names and the relationships, but I think you can already feel that we've changed it. Those dynamics will be entirely different. We're using them as inspiration." Marvel soon revealed that the sixth episode of the season would be titled "The Good Samaritan", and would tell the series' version of Reyes' origin story. It is written by executive producer Jeffrey Bell, with Billy Gierhart directing.

=== Writing ===
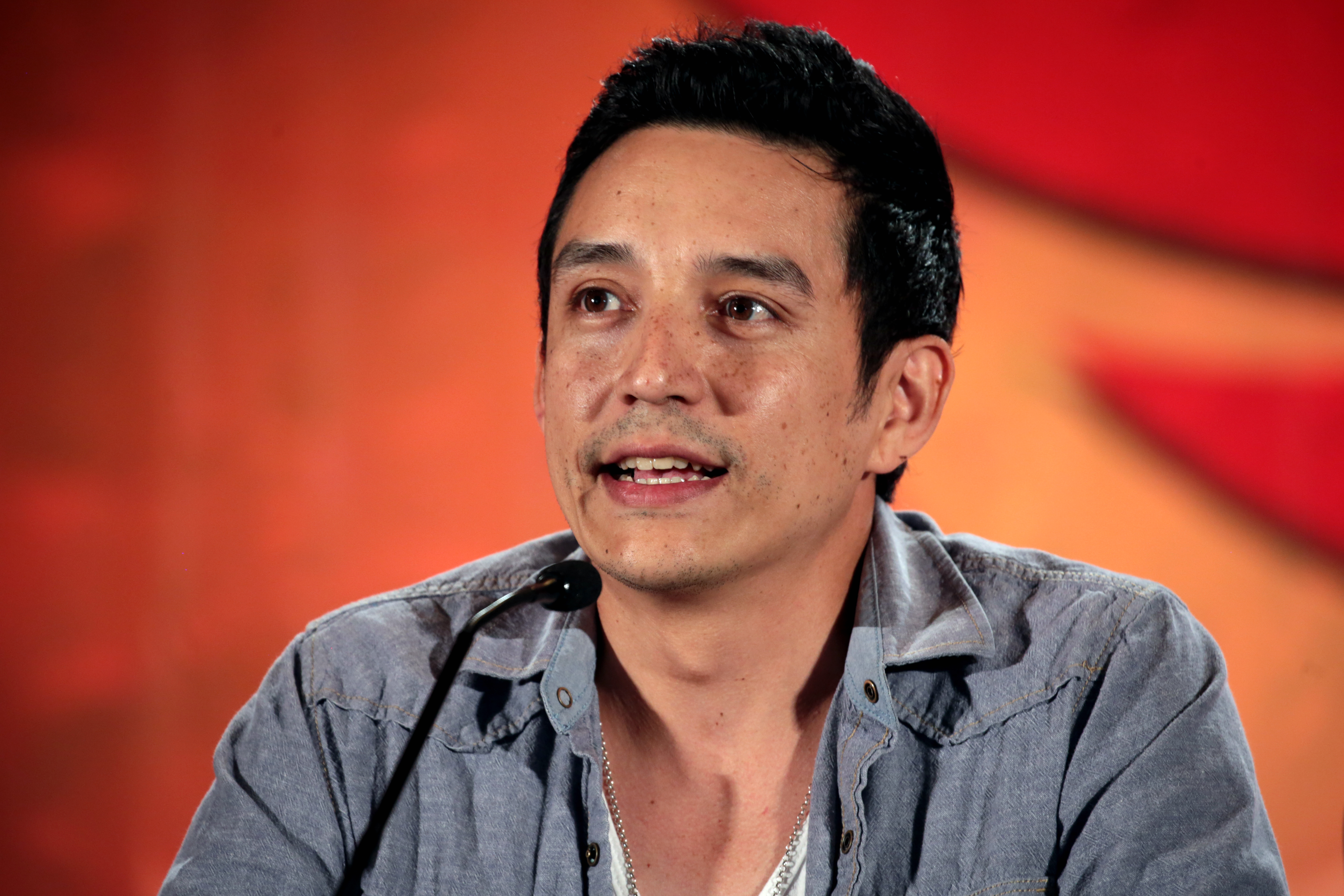
Gabriel Luna portrays Robbie Reyes / Ghost Rider, whose origin story is told in this episode

Gabriel Luna, who portrays Reyes, explained at the end of October 2016 that the confrontation between his character and the last member of the Fifth Street Locos gang in the episode "Lockup" revealed to Reyes that the accident that caused him to become Ghost Rider "wasn't just random, it was a hit, somebody ordered that, these guys were just the guys who carried it out—there's a whole batch of new questions that Robbie has after that. In episode 6, we're going to find out exactly how it happened, and we may find out why later." Luna said that the series' take on Reyes' origin story would mix elements from Felipe Smith's original comic with "this new angle that we're approaching from, but that new angle still draws from the source material." He also felt the episode's approach to revealing the story, by having Reyes tell it to his brother Gabe for the first time, was "really interesting and powerful" and the most surprising aspect of the script for him.

Ahead of the episode, Luna had also hinted at the continued conflict between Phil Coulson and the new Director of S.H.I.E.L.D. Jeffrey Mace, saying, "Coulson has been doing what he wants, doing his own thing, taking the quinjet out for a spin wherever he needs to go. He's shooting from the hip with a lot of these moves he's making, and I'm sure that's going to rub the director the wrong way. [He's bringing Ghost Rider] in who is reportedly a serial killer, so how the director is going to respond to that, we can only wait and see." Bell talked about this, acknowledging that Coulson "wants to have his cake and eat it too", having decided to step down from the role of director himself but still wanting to do what he wants. He said that they were mostly trying to "tee-up" that conflict and give the audience time to get to know Mace before more thoroughly exploring that aspect in later episodes.

Discussing the thought process behind changing Reyes' origin for the series, Bell said that the writers first wanted to ground the character in the more realistic world of the series and the wider MCU, and so though Reyes believes he is possessed by the devil in the series, they decided to instead tie the Ghost Rider figure to another dimension. Bell noted that the MCU film Doctor Strange (2016) also explores other dimensions and dimensional beings, and was being released around the same time that the episode was. The other issue that writers and producers had when approaching the origin story for the series is that they felt it was too complicated to translate accurately from the comics, particularly because the series had already used the character Mister Hyde in a different way to the comics and with Reyes' uncle Eli Morrow being a serial killer whose spirit possesses Reyes in that version. They decided to bring their origin story closer to that of other Ghost Rider iterations such as Johnny Blaze and Danny Ketch by having Reyes be more of a traditional "Spirit of Vengeance", and use Morrow in a different way that was still as a villain and "hopefully in a way that surprised people". They hoped that the series' version was true to the spirit of the comics' Robbie Reyes story while also connecting to "the past of the other" Ghost Rider characters, which was described as "the best of both worlds".

The episode also explores the idea that Reyes made a deal that involved becoming the Ghost Rider, and now he has "this thing in" him that wants to murder people which Reyes is "ambivalent" about. Bell said that this is the main aspect of their version that grounds him in "a sadness ... and a weight", particularly when interacting with his brother Gabe. In terms of the season's overarching plot, Bell said it was important to tell Reyes' origin story in the episode, rather than earlier or later, because it also reveals the "truth about Eli, and they're very connected." He also drew comparison to Marvel's Netflix television series which often wait to tell the origin story of their heroes later in the season, using flashbacks, saying, "It kind of helps to know more about the character, and be emotionally invested in the character, before you then go back and show what turned them into this person. And so part of it was that if you just began with a guy and showed the origin right away, I don't know if it would have been as compelling, I don't know if it would have been as emotional as I think it is. Bell noted that the series always shows Reyes' transformations into Ghost Rider as painful, but when that is shown happening for the first time in this episode "he screams in pain like a lunatic".

The episode ends with Morrow's villainous intentions revealed and several of the main cast apparently disappearing. Bell said that this was planned out as part of the season's storyline, and was something that the writers thought was a "fairly compelling" cliffhanger that would hopefully give audiences a reason to return to the series, which was scheduled to have three weeks off after this episode to avoid the 2016 United States presidential election and the Thanksgiving holiday.

=== Casting ===
In October 2016, Marvel confirmed that main cast members Clark Gregg as Phil Coulson, Ming-Na Wen as Melinda May, Chloe Bennet as Daisy Johnson / Quake, Iain De Caestecker as Leo Fitz, Elizabeth Henstridge as Jemma Simmons, Henry Simmons as Alphonso "Mack" Mackenzie, and John Hannah as Holden Radcliffe would be starring in the episode. In addition to Gabriel Luna and Lorenzo James Henrie as Robbie and Gabe Reyes, and José Zúñiga as Eli Morrow, the guest cast includes Jason O'Mara as Director Jeffrey Mace, Maximilian Osinski as Agent Davis, Patrick Cavanaugh as Burrows, Kerr Smith as Joseph Bauer, Lili Birdsell as Lucy Bauer, Dan Donohue as Frederick, Ward Roberts as Hugo, Usman Ally as Vincent and Shaun Clay as Tac Agent Wilder. O'Mara, Osinski, Cavanaugh, Smith, Birdsell, Donohue, Roberts, and Ally reprise their roles from earlier in the series.

The writers felt that it would be more interesting if Reyes was given the Ghost Rider mantle physically rather than by making a deal "with some disembodied spirit", and decided to tie in with an older idea associated with the comic character in which the mantle is passed from one version of the Ghost Rider to another. They decided to show another Ghost Rider arrive on a motorcycle and "hand off" the mantle to Robbie, which Bell said "promised more story to come possibly, whether now or later. It also plugged into the larger universe." The other Ghost Rider is only referred to as a "Good Samaritan" by Gabe in the episode, but the producers hinted with the character's design and an Easter egg in the previous episode that this was the Johnny Blaze version. This was later confirmed by others involved with the episode, with Luna later attributing the lack of onscreen clarification to legal issues. Blaze was originally intended to be the Ghost Rider of the series, and would have been teased in the season three finale, "Ascension", but this was changed to a tease of the Life Model Decoys once Marvel rescinded the series' ability to use the Blaze version of the character. The producers did not intend to explore Blaze beyond his brief appearance in the episode, but Bell did state that he was no longer the Ghost Rider after passing on the Spirit of Vengeance to Reyes, saying that "there is a tradition within the comics that there's been many Ghost Riders and our take on that was they're not simultaneously a tribe of Ghost Riders but that it's passed ... That's as far as we're going to take that part." The character was portrayed, uncredited, by Tom McComas during filming.

=== Filming and effects ===
A progression of the visual effects required to show Reyes' Ghost Rider transformation, created by FuseFX

Luna said that the episode was the most challenging of the show for him to make, with the production involving "nightshoots, stunts, driving, blood and squibs". To create the car crash that leads to Reyes becoming Ghost Rider, FuseFX created a CG double of the car to flip, with a lookalike car also used to drag along the ground. A digital double of Luna was created to show him come flying out of the car, which was merged with footage of Luna hanging from wires. FuseFX also created Reyes' transformations into and from Ghost Rider, CoSAFX handled the energy blasts in the episode, and Pixomondo created the visual of carbon ore materializing.

=== Marvel Cinematic Universe tie-ins ===
In March 2016, executive producer Maurissa Tancharoen had stated that there was a possibility the season could continue the story of the MCU series Agent Carter (2015–2016) in some way, given it was not renewed for the 2016–17 season. This episode reveals that the Momentum Energy Labs group introduced in the season and tied to Eli Morrow is actually a successor to the Isodyne Energy company from the second season of Agent Carter. Additionally, with the appearance of Johnny Blaze, the episode introduces that character to the MCU. The character had previously been adapted into the Sony films Ghost Rider (2007) and Ghost Rider: Spirit of Vengeance (2011), starring Nicolas Cage as Blaze, which the series had otherwise been trying to distance itself from.

== Release ==
"The Good Samaritan" was first aired in the United States on ABC on November 1, 2016. It began streaming on Netflix, along with the rest of the fourth season, on June 15, 2017.

== Reception ==
=== Ratings ===
In the United States the episode received a 0.8/3 percent share among adults between the ages of 18 and 49, meaning that it was seen by 0.8 percent of all households, and 3 percent of all of those watching television at the time of the broadcast. It was watched by 2.43 million viewers. Within a week of its release, "The Good Samaritan" had been watched by 4.57 million U.S. viewers, just above the season average of 4.22 million.

=== Critical response ===
Marc Buxton of Den of Geek gave the episode four stars out of five, praising the reveal that the "dull threat" of Lucy Bauer was just masking the true villain, Morrow. Buxton also noted the Ghost Rider origin story, which he said "goes to some pretty unexpected places"; the fight between Ghost Rider and the Inhuman Mace, which he felt showed the series was "not just a one trick pony show about Inhumans or the war with Hydra ... It's a tour of many different pieces of the Marvel Universe"; and the connections to Agent Carter, which he said were "cool to see [and] make her defunct series more important to the tapestry of the MCU." Evan Valentine at Collider scored the episode four stars out of five, indicating a "very good" episode that "has left me more excited for the future of this season than the show ever has. "The Good Samaritan" managed to blend in nearly all the crazy aspects of Agents of S.H.I.E.L.D. and produce a quality episode that stands shoulder to shoulder with their best." He felt the origin story was far more interesting than the flashbacks centered on Morrow, highlighting the chemistry between Luna and Henrie and the "breathtaking" visuals. He also noted the "fantastic" fight between Ghost Rider and Mace.

Writing for Nerdist, Joseph McCabe called the origin story a "satisfyingly tragic transformation" and "by far the most interesting part of", wishing that it had been shown unbroken by present-day scenes or even the sole focus of the episode, but felt that "at least the ongoing storyline has momentum". McCabe also lamented the death of Lucy Bauer "just when she's starting to become interesting". IGN's Terri Schwartz scored the episode 8.8 out of 10, indicating a "great" episode, and praised the "fantastic" origin story sequence, saying "it had a slow burn as Robbie and Gabe talked through the ill-fated car ride, but the payoff was worth it". She also noted the Ghost Rider and Mace fight and the Agent Carter reference, and said that the Morrow reveal was "not much of a surprise" but still "a nice twist" given the season "has been lacking a bad guy". Alex McCown-Levy of The A.V. Club graded the episode a "B", feeling that its use of both exposition and flashbacks "doesn't quite land" and that the origin story was predictable, though "delivered with a deft touch". He felt the second half of the episode was more successful, and said that Lucy being "just a prelude to Eli is acceptable".

Scott Meslow for Vulture scored the episode four stars out of five, saying it makes the season's stakes clear by being an origin story for both Ghost Rider and Morrow, and praising the series for focusing on those elements rather than trying to closely tie-in with Doctor Strange as it did in previous seasons. Meslow also said that Gabe Reyes was "a welcome addition, successfully recognizing and calling out anything that seems like bullshit." Kevin Fitzpatrick at ScreenCrush said the episode was easily the best of the season so far, though he was still "on the fence as to whether Agents of S.H.I.E.L.D. has the clearest sense of where Season 4 is going". Fitzpatrick noted that Lucy had "inarguably [been] the weakest element" of the season and was not surprised with the Morrow reveal, and questioned the series' stance on the morality of the Ghost Rider, feeling that it should have been made more clear. He added that the episode "seemed to position itself a bit better with regard to coming episodes".

Regarding Johnny Blaze, Schwartz said that "Marvel TV is introducing the idea of multiple Ghost Riders into its mythology, which sets the stage for Robbie Reyes not being the only one possessed by the Spirit of Vengeance in this world. That's more than we could have hoped for Agents of SHIELD's take on the iconic Marvel hero." She speculated that a spin-off featuring Blaze and/or Reyes was now a realistic possibility. Buxton said that "Marvel just established a much bigger Ghost Rider mythos that can be explored on TV, in movies, or Netflix and that is really damn exciting." Valentine felt the appearance was a "pretty amazing development", and stated, "Agents of S.H.I.E.L.D. almost seemed hamstrung by its connections to the Marvel Universe, seemingly unable to make a move without first consulting what precisely was happening in the movie universe. [But here] we're shown what Agents of S.H.I.E.L.D. could have been all along: a sister piece that plays to the outer elements of the MCU that the movies haven't been able to touch."
