= Emancipation (Agents of S.H.I.E.L.D.) =

- Agents of S.H.I.E.L.D. episode
- Episode no.: Season 3 Episode 20
- Directed by: Vincent Misiano
- Written by: Craig Titley
- Cinematography by: Allan Westbrook
- Editing by: Kelly Stuyvesant
- Original air date: May 10, 2016
- Running time: 42 minutes

Guest appearances
- John Hannah as Holden Radcliffe; Matthew Willig as Lash; Axle Whitehead as James / Hellfire; Natalia Cordova-Buckley as Elena "Yo-Yo" Rodriguez; Adrian Pasdar as Glenn Talbot

Episode chronology
← Previous "Failed Experiments"	Next → "Absolution"
- Agents of S.H.I.E.L.D. season 3

"Emancipation" is the twentieth episode of the third season of the American television series Agents of S.H.I.E.L.D. Based on the Marvel Comics organization S.H.I.E.L.D., it follows Phil Coulson and his team of S.H.I.E.L.D. agents as they attempt to defeat Hive while dealing with the Sokovia Accords. It is set in the Marvel Cinematic Universe (MCU) and acknowledges the franchise's films. The episode was written by Craig Titley, and directed by Vincent Misiano.

Clark Gregg reprises his role as Coulson from the film series, and is joined by series regulars Ming-Na Wen, Brett Dalton, Chloe Bennet, Iain De Caestecker, Elizabeth Henstridge, Henry Simmons, and Luke Mitchell. The episode serves as a tie-in to the film Captain America: Civil War, taking place in the aftermath of that film and showing how the Accords it introduced to the MCU affect the series' characters.

"Emancipation" originally aired on ABC on May 10, 2016, and according to Nielsen Media Research, was watched by 2.93 million viewers.

== Plot ==
Hive and James capture several Watchdogs to serve as test subjects for Radcliffe's next experiment, for which he has devised an airborne pathogen created by combining the GH325 in Daisy Johnson's blood, Terrigen, and Hive's parasites. However they become super-strong, deformed creatures incapable of speech or independent thought, completely subservient to Hive, who wants a disgusted Radcliffe to make more "Primitives".

Following the signing of the Sokovia Accords, Glenn Talbot visits the Playground to discuss the Sokovia Accords, wanting to register the Inhumans, to which Phil Coulson is strongly opposed. Elena Rodriguez also returns, wanting to help rescue Daisy, and she tries to help a dispirited Alphonso "Mack" Mackenzie as he recovers from the injuries Daisy inflicted in the previous episode, encouraging him to regain his faith. Daisy hacks into the Playground mainframe to talk to a still-quarantined Lincoln Campbell, who asks her to run away with him, abandoning both Hive and S.H.I.E.L.D. She agrees while secretly planning to hand him over to Hive, and helps him break out of his cell, steal a quinjet and escape the Playground, sending him her co-ordinates.

However this was part of a plan devised earlier by Lincoln, Coulson and Melinda May, who send Lash instead, hoping he may be able to kill Hive. Lash proves a formidable opponent to Hive, neutralizing his parasites when he attempts to enthrall him, and slaughtering the Primitives. He then uses his powers to draw the parasites out of Daisy's brain and destroy them, freeing her from Hive's control, but as she escapes, James impales Lash on a fire-charged chain, killing him. Returning to the Playground, Daisy is taken into custody, while May mourns for Andrew Garner. When Talbot reveals that Hydra stole a warhead from the Advanced Threat Containment Unit (ATCU), Leo Fitz and Jemma Simmons deduce that Hive intends to use it to unleash the mutagenic pathogen into Earth's atmosphere.

In an end tag Mack, his faith restored, is given a crucifix as a gift by Elena (the same crucifix seen in the vision of the dying S.H.I.E.L.D. agent).

== Production ==
=== Development ===
In April 2016, Marvel announced that the twentieth episode of the season would be titled "Emancipation", to be written by Craig Titley, with Vincent Misiano directing.

=== Casting ===
In April 2016, Marvel revealed that main cast members Clark Gregg, Ming-Na Wen, Brett Dalton, Chloe Bennet, Iain De Caestecker, Elizabeth Henstridge, Nick Blood, Adrianne Palicki, Henry Simmons, and Luke Mitchell would star as Phil Coulson, Melinda May, Hive, Daisy Johnson, Leo Fitz, Jemma Simmons, Lance Hunter, Bobbi Morse, Alphonso "Mack" Mackenzie, and Lincoln Campbell, respectively. It was also revealed that the guest cast for the episode would include Axle Whitehead as James, John Hannah as Holden Radcliffe, Natalia Cordova-Buckley as Elena "Yo-Yo" Rodriguez, Adrian Pasdar as Brigadier General Glenn Talbot, Trevor Torseth as Pete Boggs, Jean Paul San Pedro as Jackson, Courtney Friel as newscaster and Jason Sweat as recruit #1. Torseth, Pedro, Friel, and Sweat did not receive guest star credit in the episode. Whitehead, Hannah, Cordova-Buckley, and Pasdar reprise their roles from earlier in the series. Matthew Willig also reprises his role as Lash. Blood and Palicki do not ultimately appear.

=== Marvel Cinematic Universe tie-ins ===
The episode is set in the aftermath of Captain America: Civil War, and deals with how the Inhumans are affected by the Sokovia Accords, with some members of the S.H.I.E.L.D. team feeling "Inhumans should be registered and [others] who feel that's a first step to them being sequestered, imprisoned, exterminated." Bennet said, "we've been dealing with the bigger issues of Civil War on a smaller, more personal scale for a while now. It's been building. We've been having our own mini version of Civil War." Wen noted that "the connection is there, but it's also very tenuous at this point, because S.H.I.E.L.D. has become so isolated with what's going on with the Avengers and them not knowing still that Coulson is alive." The episode explains the film's lack of acknowledgement of the Inhumans and the wider effects of the Accords—due to the film having been written before the series' third season began production—by noting that S.H.I.E.L.D. would have to become "a legitimate organization again" if it revealed itself and the Inhumans to the general public, and "with that would come any rules and regulations that come with government oversight" which would interfere with the groups' attempts to defeat Hive.

The episode also acknowledges the death of Peggy Carter in Civil War, which executive producer Jeffrey Bell said was important for the series due to her role in the universe as a founder of S.H.I.E.L.D., adding, "Any time we can make a connection to her, whether in a flashback or dealing with what's happening now, it makes the universe smaller." At the time of "Emancipation"'s airing, the fate of the character's own television series Agent Carter was unknown, with several outlets noting that this could be a surprise, meta-announcement of that series' cancellation. ABC officially canceled the series two days later.

== Broadcast ==
"Emancipation" was first aired in the United States on ABC on May 10, 2016.

== Reception ==
=== Ratings ===
In the United States the episode received a 0.9/3 percent share among adults between the ages of 18 and 49, meaning that it was seen by 0.9 percent of all households, and 3 percent of all of those watching television at the time of the broadcast. It was watched by 2.93 million viewers.
