= What They Become =

- Agents of S.H.I.E.L.D. episode
- The introduction of the Inhumans to the Marvel Cinematic Universe in the final scene of the episode was praised for being groundbreaking, while criticized for being insignificant to non-comic book fans.
- Episode no.: Season 2 Episode 10
- Directed by: Michael Zinberg
- Written by: Jeffrey Bell
- Cinematography by: Feliks Parnell
- Editing by: Joshua Charson; Kelly Struyvesant
- Original air date: December 9, 2014
- Running time: 43 minutes

Guest appearances
- Kyle MacLachlan as Calvin Zabo; B. J. Britt as Antoine Triplett; Henry Simmons as Alphonso "Mack" Mackenzie; Adrianne Palicki as Bobbi Morse; Ruth Negga as Raina; Reed Diamond as Daniel Whitehall; Patton Oswalt as Billy Koenig and Sam Koenig; Jamie Harris as man

Episode chronology
← Previous "...Ye Who Enter Here"	Next → "Aftershocks"
- Agents of S.H.I.E.L.D. season 2

"What They Become" is the tenth episode of the second season of the American television series Agents of S.H.I.E.L.D. Based on the Marvel Comics organization S.H.I.E.L.D., it follows Phil Coulson and his team of S.H.I.E.L.D. agents as they race to destroy an ancient Kree city before Hydra can get to it and unlock a potentially extinction-level event. It is set in the Marvel Cinematic Universe (MCU) and acknowledges the franchise's films. The episode was written by Jeffrey Bell, and directed by Michael Zinberg.

Clark Gregg reprises his role as Coulson from the film series, and is joined by principal cast members Ming-Na Wen, Brett Dalton, Chloe Bennet, Iain De Caestecker, Elizabeth Henstridge, and Nick Blood. The episode introduces the Inhumans to the MCU, and reveals that principal character Skye (Bennet) is actually comics character Daisy Johnson, while guest character "The Doctor" (Kyle MacLachlan) is Calvin Zabo.

"What They Become" originally aired on ABC on December 9, 2014, and according to Nielsen Media Research, was watched by 5.29 million viewers. The episode received a positive critical response, with the performance of guest star Kyle MacLachlan praised, and the introduction of the Inhumans, along with the character reveals, highlighted as groundbreaking and exciting, though also potentially confusing or insignificant to non-comic book fans.

== Plot ==
Immediately following the events of "...Ye Who Enter Here", S.H.I.E.L.D. Agent Melinda May outmaneuvers her Hydra assailants and flies to San Juan, Puerto Rico, where S.H.I.E.L.D. must race to enter the hidden Kree city below and destroy it before Hydra can get to it. A contact in San Juan reveals to agents Bobbi Morse and Lance Hunter that Hydra has already arrived, setting up residence above the ancient temple said to be needed for an extinction-type of event. Guessing that Hydra intends to drill straight down to the temple, S.H.I.E.L.D. decides to attack straight away.

Inside the Hydra base, former S.H.I.E.L.D. agent Grant Ward delivers Skye to her father; who introduces himself as Cal. He is regretful for having not been able to raise Skye and protect her himself, but wants to fix that now by helping her fulfil her "destiny". He explains that her mother came from a line of people who have gifts, and she was taken by Hydra agents under the guise of S.H.I.E.L.D. Hydra leader Daniel Whitehall butchered her, took the secret to her gift (long-life) and threw her remains in a ditch, where Cal found her, swearing vengeance against Whitehall, the man he is now supposedly aligned with. Realizing who Cal and Skye are, and that Ward isn't loyal to Hydra, Whitehall has the three incapacitated and guarded, but is prevented from taking further action when S.H.I.E.L.D. Director Phil Coulson attacks the base, along with May, Morse, and Hunter, in hopes of disabling the drill before Hydra can reach the temple with the Obelisk.

Agents Antoine Triplett, Jemma Simmons, and Leo Fitz enter the city and place Howling Commando explosives around the temple, ready to destroy it for good. During the fighting in the Hydra base, Cal escapes and finds Whitehall, ready to take his vengeance, but is prevented from doing so when Whitehall drops dead, killed by Coulson. Enraged, Cal attacks Coulson, and only stops when Skye threatens to kill him. He agrees to leave, and reveals that Skye's real name is Daisy Johnson. Agent 33, feeling lost without Whitehall, who had brainwashed her, helps Ward escape from S.H.I.E.L.D. and Hydra. Skye, wanting to make things right, goes looking for the Obelisk, and realizes that Raina, who Cal also believes to be descended from the gifted people, has taken it down to the city. There she finds Alphonso "Mack" Mackenzie, possessed by the city, who guides her to the temple. Skye follows Raina into the city, and Coulson follows her soon after, against May's advice. Hearing of this, Triplett races to disable the explosives, and then searches for the temple to help Skye.

Skye reaches the temple to find Raina waiting for her. The Obelisk floats to a central pedestal, and the temple begins to close itself. Coulson is stopped from entering by Mack, but Triplett manages to get in before the room is sealed. The Obelisk opens, revealing crystals inside that release a burst of mist. Skye and Raina begin to be covered by stone, and in an attempt to save them, Triplett smashes the Obelisk and the crystals. This doesn't work, and the two become fully encased in stone cocoons. Triplett, thinking he has lost his friend Skye, is turned to stone by a shard of the Obelisk. Raina's cocoon begins to crack, her appearance having been transformed during the process, although she is not shown in full in this episode. Skye bursts out of her own cocoon, her new abilities shaking the entire island, but she watches in horror as Triplett's petrified body crumbles in front of her.

In an end tag, another Obelisk glows and pulses; apparently alerting a man with no eyes. He calls an unknown person to say that there is someone new.

== Production ==
=== Development ===
In November 2014, Marvel announced that the tenth episode of the season would be titled "What They Become", to be written by executive producer Jeffrey Bell, with Michael Zinberg directing.

=== Writing ===
Talking about the revealing of Calvin Zabo and Daisy Johnson in the episode, executive producer Maurissa Tancharoen said, "As we always do, we pulled from what exists in the Marvel Universe and put our own spin on it. We had always had our eyes on Daisy Johnson, and therefore her father and her whole history. We sort of planted that throughout the first season and a half. You knew the story of her parents and the havoc they caused, the massacre in the Hunan province in China. We lay in things like that, and over time you put the pieces together. But of course Daisy's powers aren't really activated until that moment you see in the Winter Finale." Continuing on from this, executive producer Jed Whedon stated that "There are parts of it that move away from the story in the comics, but partially that's because we'd invented our own way [of getting there]. We also wanted it to be a surprise to the people who are familiar with the comics, but [it's] also because we're tying it to a larger world. [It's] not just her origin story, it's the origin story of a bigger, other world."

Elaborating on that and the idea of introducing the Inhumans to the MCU in the episode, Tancharoen said, "It's been a property in the Marvel Universe that we've been interested in since the beginning. Our tagline when we began the show was "not all heroes are super," and we wanted to focus on that and highlight that for the first season. Now as we move forward we're diving deeper into the Marvel Universe, and it's our way of exploring a whole new world that may be comprised of people who have special abilities. We think that's going to open everything up for us." Also, speaking on the death of Agent Triplett in the episode, something the executive producers do not "take lightly", Whedon explained, "We need to establish that there are stakes in our world, and there can be real consequences. But mostly for us it was for the mixed emotion of that moment, which we're very proud of. Our whole goal is to have the audience feel something, and to be able to feel excitement and despair at the same time made it seem more powerful to us. It makes for a more complicated journey for Skye going forward, because it's not all fun and games ... this is something that she may not understand right away. What happened in there, it would be complicated anyway to understand. Now it will be very emotionally complex as well."

=== Casting ===
In November 2014, Marvel revealed that main cast members Clark Gregg, Ming-Na Wen, Brett Dalton, Chloe Bennet, Iain De Caestecker, Elizabeth Henstridge, and Nick Blood would star as Phil Coulson, Melinda May, Grant Ward, Skye, Leo Fitz, Jemma Simmons, and Lance Hunter, respectively. It was also revealed that the guest cast for the episode would include B. J. Britt as Antoine Triplett, Adrianne Palicki as Bobbi Morse, Henry Simmons as Alphonso "Mack" Mackenzie, Ruth Negga as Raina, Patton Oswalt as Billy Koenig and Sam Koenig, Reed Diamond as Daniel Whitehall, Kyle MacLachlan as The Doctor, Jamie Harris as man, and Hunter Seagroves as Hydra agent. Seagroves did not receive guest star credit in the episode. Britt, Palicki, Simmons, Negga, Oswalt, Diamond, and MacLachlan all reprise their roles from earlier in the series. Ming-Na Wen also portrays Agent 33. The episode reveals that MacLachlan's character, previously referred to only as "The Doctor", is actually Calvin Zabo, while principal character Skye is his daughter, Daisy Johnson.

On portraying Agent 33, Ming-Na Wen stated that "It's sort of a sad character for me to portray because she's so opposite from May. May is so confident and knows exactly what she needs to do and can get the job done based on her own opinions and with Agent 33, not only is she disfigured, not only doesn't she have her face anymore, she doesn't have her identity anymore. ... I think it'll be interesting to see how her character gets resolved or how her character evolves down the line." About the introduction of Jamie Harris as "man" at the end of the episode, Tancharoen said "you will learn his character's name pretty soon."

=== Marvel Cinematic Universe tie-ins ===
"What They Become" reveals that Skye and Raina are Inhumans, thus introducing that species to the MCU. Jed Whedon said that "It's been something in the works for a long time. It's an important property in the comics, and they have obviously announced plans for a feature in the cinematic universe. It's one of the first instances where we get to start planting the seeds on the show before the film." In April 2016, the Inhumans film was taken off Marvel Studios' release schedule.

== Release ==
=== Broadcast ===
"What They Become" was first aired in the United States on ABC on December 9, 2014. It was aired alongside the US broadcast in Canada on CTV.

=== Home media ===
The episode began streaming on Netflix on June 11, 2015, and was released along with the rest of the second season on September 18, 2015, on Blu-ray and DVD. The episode, along with the rest of the series, was removed from Netflix on February 28, 2022, and later became available on Disney+ on March 16, 2022.

== Reception ==
=== Ratings ===
In the United States the episode received a 1.7/5 percent share among adults between the ages of 18 and 49, meaning that it was seen by 1.7 percent of all households, and 5 percent of all of those watching television at the time of the broadcast. It was watched by 5.29 million viewers. The Canadian broadcast gained 2.33 million viewers, the second highest for that day, and the third highest for the week.

=== Critical response ===
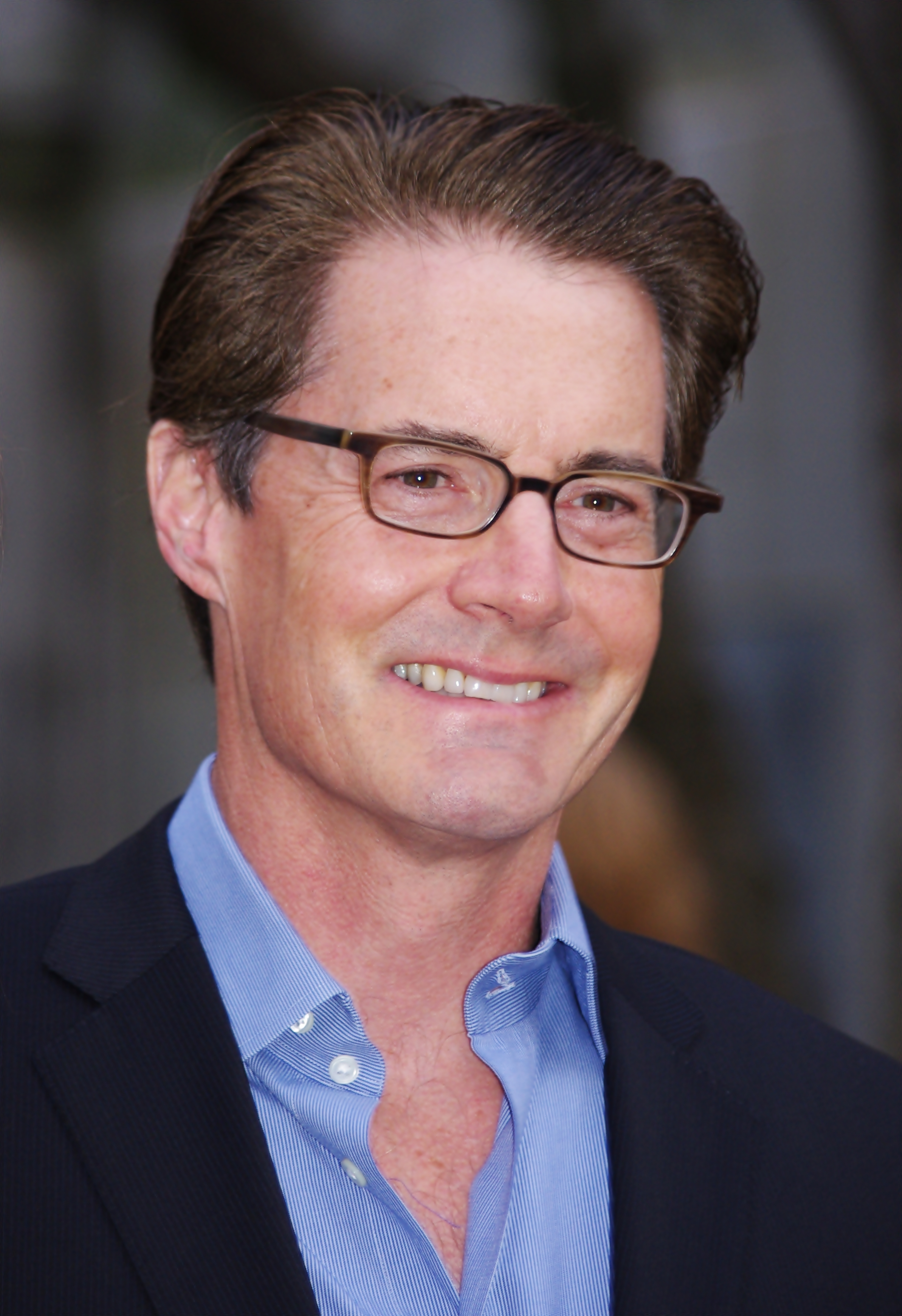
Kyle MacLachlan's performance in the episode was highly praised by critics.

Alan Sepinwall, writing for HitFix, felt that the episode, as the culmination of many of the season's storylines so far, "had a whole lot to squeeze into a short amount of time", and also felt that it did so mostly successfully. Sepinwall particularly praised the Skye and Cal reunion scene and the performances of Bennet and MacLachlan, while noting that Triplett's "sacrifice probably would have meant more if he had been given more to do this season". Eric Goldman of IGN scored the episode a 9.3 out of 10, indicating an "Amazing" episode, responding positively to the Daisy and Cal and Inhuman reveals and the impact they have on the MCU films, praising MacLachlan's performance, as well as Bennet's, but stating that Triplett "died still feeling like an unfulfilled character." Oliver Sava of The A.V. Club graded the episode an "A−", saying "the show is finally realizing its full potential", praising the introduction of the Inhumans and MacLachlan's performance, as well as the dramatic weight given to the final scene, though he noted that Triplett's "death isn't quite as impactful as it should be ... because he never really integrated into the team in a meaningful way."

James Hunt of Den of Geek praised the introduction of the Inhumans, and the way that the episode tied up multiple storylines, whilst setting up new and exciting ones for the rest of the season. Kevin Fitzpatrick of ScreenCrush felt that, from a casual viewer's perspective rather than a comics fan's, the Daisy and Cal and Inhuman reveals were most likely insignificant, and perhaps made the episode a bit of a let-down in terms of a mid-season finale. Fitzpatrick also felt that the Skye and Cal reunion overshadowed the other storylines and relationships in the episode, but did praise the action scenes, specifically the opening dogfight and the Coulson and Cal fight. Some of Fitzpatrick's thoughts were reiterated by Joseph McCabe of Nerdist, who stated "Agents of S.H.I.E.L.D. hasn't seen an episode so simultaneously satisfying to longtime comic-book fans and frustrating to its general audience as it does in "What They Become"", noting that the Daisy and Cal and Inhuman reveals would mean nothing to average viewers, as opposed to "Marvel maniacs" who "should be elated". McCabe did have praise for MacLachan's performance, calling his reunion with Skye "the most entertaining" scene of the season, and saying "He generates humor, rage, joy, spite, menace, sympathy, and insanity all in the span of a few minutes. ... watching him creepily stroke Skye's hair as he hums "Daisy Bell" is absurdly entertaining."

=== Accolades ===
In June 2016, IGN ranked the episode as the third best in the series.
