= The Portrait (2023 film) =

Film by Simon Ross

- Release poster
- Directed by: Simon Ross
- Written by: David Griffiths
- Produced by: Christian de Gallegos; David Griffiths
- Starring: Natalia Cordova-Buckley; Ryan Kwanten; Isidora Goreshter; Mark-Paul Gosselaar; Virginia Madsen
- Cinematography: Luke Hanlein
- Edited by: Simon Ross
- Music by: Alexander Wells
- Production companies: David Griffiths Films; Ambassador Film Group
- Distributed by: Altitude Film Distribution
- Release dates: 20 October 2023 (San Diego Film Festival); 11 December 2023 (United Kingdom)
- Running time: 86 minutes
- Country: United Kingdom
- Language: English

The Portrait is a 2023 British psychological thriller film starring Natalia Cordova-Buckley, Ryan Kwanten, Isidora Goreshter, Mark-Paul Gosselaar and Virginia Madsen. Directed by Simon Ross, in his feature debut, and written by David Griffiths, the plot is about a wife accidentally causing her husband's brain injury and being haunted by a portrait that resembles him.

The film premiered at San Diego Film Festival on 20 October 2023, and was released in the United Kingdom through digital platforms on 11 December 2023.

== Premise ==
After Sofia causes her husband Alex's accident that leaves him with a brain injury, she becomes fixated on a mysterious portrait that bears a striking resemblance to his former self. However, as the portrait begins to haunt her, she must determine whether it is possessed or if she is having a mental breakdown.

== Cast ==
- Natalia Cordova-Buckley as Sofia
- Ryan Kwanten as Alex
- Mark-Paul Gosselaar as Brookes
- Virginia Madsen as Mags, Alex's cousin
- Isidora Goreshter as police sergeant
- Steffie Baik as Esther

== Production ==
The Portrait was directed by Simon Ross (in his feature directorial debut) from David Griffiths' script. Natalia Cordova-Buckley, Ryan Kwanten, Mark-Paul Gosselaar and Virginia Madsen were cast in lead roles.

== Release ==
The Portrait had its North American premiere at the 2023 San Diego Film Festival on 20 October. The film's European premiere took place at Raindance Film Festival on 31 October 2023, where it was nominated for Best UK Feature. The film was released in the United States on VOD and digital platforms by Saban Films on 8 December 2023. It was released in the United Kingdom by Altitude Film Distribution on 11 December 2023.

== Reception ==
On the review aggregator website Rotten Tomatoes, 86% of 7 critics' reviews are positive, with an average rating of 5.7/10.

Phil Hoad of The Guardian gave the film a score of three out of five and writing, "While this gothic chestnut, and the psychodrama that follows—with Sofia unsure how much is the product of her own under-siege mind—feel familiar, Ross injects them with a troubling inner turbulence that bodes well for him".
