= Failed Experiments =

- Agents of S.H.I.E.L.D. episode
- Episode no.: Season 3 Episode 19
- Directed by: Wendey Stanzler
- Written by: Brent Fletcher
- Cinematography by: Feliks Parnell
- Editing by: Joshua Charson
- Original air date: May 3, 2016
- Running time: 41 minutes

Guest appearances
- John Hannah as Holden Radcliffe; Axle Whitehead as James / Hellfire; Derek Phillips as O'Brien; Alicia Vela-Bailey as Alisha Whitley; Jason Glover as Hive's original form

Episode chronology
← Previous "The Singularity"	Next → "Emancipation"
- Agents of S.H.I.E.L.D. season 3

"Failed Experiments" is the nineteenth episode of the third season of the American television series Agents of S.H.I.E.L.D. Based on the Marvel Comics organization S.H.I.E.L.D., it follows Phil Coulson and his team of S.H.I.E.L.D. agents as they attempt to defeat Hive. It is set in the Marvel Cinematic Universe (MCU) and acknowledges the franchise's films. The episode was written by Brent Fletcher, and directed by Wendey Stanzler.

Clark Gregg reprises his role as Coulson from the film series, and is joined by series regulars Ming-Na Wen, Brett Dalton, Chloe Bennet, Iain De Caestecker, Elizabeth Henstridge, Henry Simmons, and Luke Mitchell.

"Failed Experiments" originally aired on ABC on May 3, 2016, and according to Nielsen Media Research, was watched by 2.92 million viewers.

== Plot ==
Holden Radcliffe's first attempt to turn humans into Inhumans fails when the Hydra operatives used as test subjects die, and he realizes that living Kree blood is needed. Wanting her friends at S.H.I.E.L.D. to feel what she is feeling while under Hive's control, Daisy Johnson suggests to him that they turn the agents into Inhumans once Radcliffe's experiments succeed. Hive is concerned that Daisy still cares about her human friends, worrying she will not be able to fight them if necessary.

Leo Fitz and Jemma Simmons create a potential cure for Hive's infection, but it could destroy the immune system of an Inhuman it is used on. Lincoln Campbell offers to be a test subject, but Phil Coulson forbids him. However he later injects himself with the antitoxin anyway, leaving him severely weakened, while proving it would not work against Hive's infection. His immune system having shut down, Lincoln is put in quarantine until he recovers.

Daisy is caught on surveillance by S.H.I.E.L.D., revealing Hive's location to them, but while Alphonso "Mack" Mackenzie believes she is resisting the enthrallment and trying to contact S.H.I.E.L.D. for help, Coulson suspects a trap. He sends a team led by Melinda May and Mack to infiltrate the town and assassinate Hive, and May poses as a Hydra operative to trick James into revealing Hive's whereabouts. The team find the Kree artifact, revealed to be a beacon, which Hive is using to signal to a meteor orbiting Earth. The meteor crashes in the town, and two Kree Reapers, who have been cryogenically preserved inside for over a thousand years, emerge and begin hunting for Inhumans, having been put in orbit by their masters as a fail-safe in case the Inhumans rebelled against them.

One of the Reapers attacks Hive, who eventually kills him in a fight, after which the S.H.I.E.L.D. team attempt to destroy Hive with a grenade launcher, which proves insufficient. The other Kree kills Alisha Whitley before Daisy incapacitates him, and Radcliffe begins draining his blood. Mack approaches Daisy and tries to convince her to leave with him, still believing she is resisting Hive's control, but she denies it and reveals Hive's plan to transform humankind. Mack then vaporizes the captured Kree with a Hydra splinter bomb, and a livid Daisy attacks him, subduing him with her powers and beating him savagely. May shoots her to save Mack, and the S.H.I.E.L.D. agents escape while Radcliffe tends to Hive and Daisy's injuries. Remembering that there is Kree blood inside her from the GH325 injected into her after she was shot by Ian Quinn, (Note: As depicted in "T.R.A.C.K.S.".) Daisy offers to let her blood be harvested.

== Production ==
=== Development ===
In April 2016, Marvel announced that the nineteenth episode of the season would be titled "Failed Experiments", to be written by Brent Fletcher, with Wendey Stanzler directing.

=== Casting ===
In April 2016, Marvel revealed that main cast members Clark Gregg, Ming-Na Wen, Brett Dalton, Chloe Bennet, Iain De Caestecker, Elizabeth Henstridge, Nick Blood, Adrianne Palicki, Henry Simmons, and Luke Mitchell would star as Phil Coulson, Melinda May, Hive, Daisy Johnson, Leo Fitz, Jemma Simmons, Lance Hunter, Bobbi Morse, Alphonso "Mack" Mackenzie, and Lincoln Campbell, respectively. It was also revealed that the guest cast for the episode would include Axle Whitehead as James, John Hannah as Holden Radcliffe, Alicia Vela-Bailey as Alisha Whitley, Alexander Wraith as Agent Anderson, Mark Atteberry as Kurt Vogel, Derek Phillips as Agent O'Brien, Briana Venskus as Agent Piper, Lynn Longosz as Kree reaper #1 and Chris Hubbard as Kree reaper #2. Vela-Bailey, Wraith, Atteberry, Venskus, Longosz, and Hubbard did not receive guest star credit in the episode. Whitehead, Hannah, Vela-Bailey, Wraith, Atteberry, and Phillips reprise their roles from earlier in the series. Blood and Palicki do not ultimately appear.

== Broadcast ==
"Failed Experiments" was first aired in the United States on ABC on May 3, 2016.

== Reception ==
=== Ratings ===
In the United States the episode received a 0.9/3 percent share among adults between the ages of 18 and 49, meaning that it was seen by 0.9 percent of all households, and 3 percent of all of those watching television at the time of the broadcast. It was watched by 2.92 million viewers.
