= The Laws of Inferno Dynamics =

- Agents of S.H.I.E.L.D. episode
- Episode no.: Season 4 Episode 8
- Directed by: Kevin Tancharoen
- Written by: Paul Zbyszewski
- Cinematography by: Allan Westbrook
- Editing by: Joshua Charson; Dexter N. Adriano
- Original air date: December 6, 2016

Guest appearances
- Gabriel Luna as Robbie Reyes / Ghost Rider; José Zúñiga as Eli Morrow; Natalia Cordova-Buckley as Elena "Yo-Yo" Rodriguez; Mallory Jansen as Aida; Jason O'Mara as Jeffrey Mace

Episode chronology
← Previous "Deals with Our Devils"	Next → "Broken Promises"
- Agents of S.H.I.E.L.D. season 4

"The Laws of Inferno Dynamics" is the eighth episode and mid-season finale of the fourth season of the American television series Agents of S.H.I.E.L.D. Based on the Marvel Comics organization S.H.I.E.L.D., it follows Phil Coulson and his team of S.H.I.E.L.D. agents as they work with the Ghost Rider to defeat Eli Morrow. It is set in the Marvel Cinematic Universe (MCU) and acknowledges the franchise's films. The episode was written by Paul Zbyszewski, and directed by Kevin Tancharoen.

Clark Gregg reprises his role as Coulson from the film series, and is joined by series regulars Ming-Na Wen, Chloe Bennet, Iain De Caestecker, Elizabeth Henstridge, Henry Simmons, and John Hannah. Recurring guest stars Gabriel Luna and José Zúñiga portray the Ghost Rider, Robbie Reyes, and his uncle Morrow, respectively. The episode serves as the last in the first "pod" of episodes for the season, subtitled Ghost Rider.

"The Laws of Inferno Dynamics" was originally broadcast on ABC on December 6, 2016, and, according to Nielsen Media Research, was watched by 4.49 million viewers within a week of its release.

== Plot ==
Tracking down Eli Morrow, as well as mercenaries he has recruited, S.H.I.E.L.D. corner them in a warehouse, but after Elena "Yo-Yo" Rodriguez is injured in an explosion, Robbie Reyes enters the building alone. He discovers that Morrow has built a highly unstable demon core to make himself even more powerful, despite its potential to destroy Los Angeles in a nuclear explosion. The danger is increased by a series of tremors throughout the city, and Leo Fitz deduces they are being caused by Morrow, who is not creating matter from nothing after all, but is stealing energy from the Hell dimension, causing inter-dimensional disturbances. Morrow impales Robbie on carbon spikes, trapping him inside the demon core, and defends his actions, insisting he deserves godlike power after being underestimated and condescended to throughout his life.

Phil Coulson reveals to Jeffrey Mace that Aida is an android. Despite his anger at Holden Radcliffe's deceit, Mace has Melinda May bring in Radcliffe and Aida, sending them into the warehouse to rebuild their portal generator under the demon core, so as to send it to the Hell dimension. While Daisy Johnson tries to contain the tremors, Coulson confronts Morrow and reveals the true nature of his abilities to him, distracting him while May, Alphonso "Mack" Mackenzie, Rodriguez, and Mace get into position. The agents attack Morrow and his men, and Robbie traps Morrow with him in the demon core as Fitz, Jemma Simmons, Radcliffe, and Aida send it to Hell. Johnson releases the energy she has absorbed from the tremors and is launched into the sky, resulting in her landing in the middle of a gathering of journalists covering the crisis.

Mace subsequently tells the press that Johnson was undercover as a vigilante combatting the Watchdogs on S.H.I.E.L.D.'s behalf. He also reveals Ellen Nadeer's blackmail to the other agents. Mack and Rodriguez begin a relationship, while Coulson reassures Johnson about Robbie's fate, revealing he knows of a previous Ghost Rider who escaped from Hell. He also confides that he had hoped Johnson would one day become S.H.I.E.L.D.'s director. Sent by Mace to retrieve Radcliffe's Life Model Decoy (LMD) work from his home, S.H.I.E.L.D. technician Nathanson discovers a captive Melinda May, who was abducted earlier by Aida and replaced by an identical LMD that possesses May's memories and personality, but lacks awareness of its true android nature. To keep her secret, Aida murders Nathanson.

== Production ==
=== Development ===
In November 2016, Marvel revealed that the eighth episode of the season, and mid-season finale, would be titled "The Laws of Inferno Dynamics", to be written by Paul Zbyszewski and directed by Kevin Tancharoen.

=== Casting ===
Main cast members Clark Gregg as Phil Coulson, Ming-Na Wen as Melinda May, Chloe Bennet as Daisy Johnson / Quake, Iain De Caestecker as Leo Fitz, Elizabeth Henstridge as Jemma Simmons, Henry Simmons as Alphonso "Mack" Mackenzie, and John Hannah as Holden Radcliffe were confirmed to be starring in the episode.

Also revealed was the guest cast for the episode, including Natalia Cordova-Buckley as Elena "Yo-Yo" Rodriguez, Jason O'Mara as Director Jeffrey Mace, Gabriel Luna as Robbie Reyes, Mallory Jansen as Aida, Patrick Cavanaugh as Burrows, José Zúñiga as Eli Morrow, Blaise Miller as Agent Nathanson, Coleen Sullivan as reporter and Steve Suh as Peng. Cordova-Buckley, O'Mara, Luna, Jansen, Cavanaugh, Zúñiga, and Miller reprise their roles from earlier in the series.

== Release ==
"The Laws of Inferno Dynamics" was first shown in the United States on ABC on December 6, 2016. It began streaming on Netflix, along with the rest of the fourth season, on June 15, 2017.

== Reception ==
In the United States, the episode received a 0.7/3 percent share among adults between the ages of 18 and 49, meaning that it was seen by 0.7 percent of all households, and 3 percent of all of those watching television at the time of the broadcast. It was watched by 2.37 million viewers. Within a week of its release, "The Laws of Inferno Dynamics" had been watched by 4.49 million U.S. viewers, just above the season average of 4.22 million.
