= Billy Gierhart =

American steadicam operator, television director

- Other name: Bill Gierhart
- Occupations: Steadicam operator, television director, Producer
- Years active: 1997–present
- Spouse: Cherie Gierhart (m. 2003)

Bill Gierhart is an American television director and former steadicam operator.

For many years he worked a steadicam operator on the television series Pacific Blue, Huff, Swingtown and The Shield, making his directorial debut on the latter series penultimate episode "Possible Kill Screen" in 2008.

His other credits as a television director include, Lone Star, Terriers, The Chicago Code, Sons of Anarchy, Torchwood, Breakout Kings, The Walking Dead and Agents of S.H.I.E.L.D.

== Filmography ==
=== Sons of Anarchy ===
- 1.09 "Hell Followed" (2008)
- 2.06 "Falx Cerebri" (2009)
- 3.03 "Caregiver" (2010)
- 3.07 "Widening Gyre" (2010)
- 4.04 "Una Venta" (2011)
- 5.09 "Andare Pescare" (2012)
- 6.04 "Wolfsangel" (2013)
- 6.10 "Huang Wu" (2013)
- 7.02 "Toil and Till" (2014)

=== The Walking Dead ===
- 2.04 "Cherokee Rose" (2012)
- 2.09 "Triggerfinger" (2012)
- 3.02 "Sick" (2013)
- 3.08 "Made to Suffer" (2013)
- 5.07 "Crossed" (2014)
- 6.13 "The Same Boat" (2015)

=== Torchwood ===
- "Series 4: Miracle Day" (2011)
  - 2 - "Rendition"
  - 3 - "Dead of Night"
  - 4 - "Escape to L.A."
  - 10 - "The Blood Line"

=== The Chicago Code ===
1.07 "Black Hand and the Shotgun Man" (2011)

=== Agents of S.H.I.E.L.D. ===
- 1.09 "Repairs" (2013)
- 1.20 "Nothing Personal" (2014)
- 2.09 "...Ye Who Enter Here" (2014)
- 2.11 "Aftershocks" (2014)
- 2.22 "S.O.S. Part 2" (2014)
- 3.21 "Absolution" (2016)
- 4.01 "The Ghost" (2016)
- 4.06 "The Good Samaritan" (2016)

=== Once Upon a Time ===
- 3.12 "New York City Serenade" (2013)
- 4.07 "The Snow Queen" (2014)
- 4.17 "Heart of Gold" (2015)
- 5.13 "Labor of Love" (2016)
- 6.11 "Tougher Than the Rest" (2017)
- 6.16 "Mother's Little Helper" (2017)

=== Jessica Jones ===
- 1.12 "AKA Take a Bloody Number" (2015)

=== S.W.A.T. ===
- 1.02 "Cuchillo" (2017)
- 1.03 "Pamilya" (2017)
- 1.09 "Blindspots" (2018)
- 1.16 "Payback" (2018)
- 1.20 "Vendetta" (2018)
- 1.22 "Hoax" (2018)
- 2.01 "Shaky Town" (2018)
- 2.03 "Fire and Smoke" (2018)
- 2.11 "School" (2019)
- 2.18 "Cash Flowl (2019)
- 2.23 "Kangaroo" (2019)
- 3.01 "Fire in the Sky" (2019)
- 3.08 "Lion's Den" (2019)
- 3.13 "Ekitai Rashku" (2020)
- 3.15 "Knockout" (2020)
- 3.20 "Stigma" (2020)
- 4.01 "3 Seventeen Year Olds" (2020)
- 4.02 "Stakeout" (2020)
- 4.08 "Crusade" (2021)
- 5.01 "Vagabundo" (2021)
- 5.02 "Madrugada" (2021)
- 5.09 "Survive" (2022)
- 5.12 "Provenance" (2022)
- 5.16 "The Fugitive" (2022)
- 6.01 "Thai Hard" (2022)
- 6.02 "Thai Another Day" (2022)
- 6.15 "To Protect & Serve" (2023)
- 7.01 "The Promise" (2024)
- 7.02 "Peace Talks" (2024)
- 7.13 "Twenty Squad" (2024)
- 8.01 "Vanished" (2024)
- 8.08 "Left of Boom" (2024)
- 8.18 "Exploited" (2025)
- 8.22 "Return to Base" (2025)

=== Inhumans ===
- 1.08 "...And Finally: Black Bolt" (2017)

=== The Night Agent ===
- 3.09 "Lockstep" (2026)
- 3.10 "Razzmatazz" (2026)

=== S.W.A.T. Exiles ===
- 1.05 "Molotov Cocktail Atire"
