= ...Ye Who Enter Here =

- Agents of S.H.I.E.L.D. episode
- Episode no.: Season 2 Episode 9
- Directed by: Billy Gierhart
- Written by: Paul Zbyszewski
- Cinematography by: Allan Westbrook
- Editing by: Eric Litman; Kelly Stuyvesant
- Original air date: December 2, 2014
- Running time: 42 minutes

Guest appearances
- B. J. Britt as Antoine Triplett; Adrianne Palicki as Bobbi Morse; Henry Simmons as Alphonso "Mack" Mackenzie; Ruth Negga as Raina; Reed Diamond as Daniel Whitehall; Patton Oswalt as Billy Koenig and Sam Koenig

Episode chronology
← Previous "The Things We Bury"	Next → "What They Become"
- Agents of S.H.I.E.L.D. season 2

"...Ye Who Enter Here" is the ninth episode of the second season of the American television series Agents of S.H.I.E.L.D. Based on the Marvel Comics organization S.H.I.E.L.D., it follows Phil Coulson and his team of S.H.I.E.L.D. agents as they race Hydra to enter a hidden alien city, and get to the mysterious Raina. It is set in the Marvel Cinematic Universe (MCU) and acknowledges the franchise's films. The episode was written by Paul Zbyszewski and directed by Billy Gierhart.

Clark Gregg reprises his role as Coulson from the film series, and is joined by principal cast members Ming-Na Wen, Brett Dalton, Chloe Bennet, Iain De Caestecker, Elizabeth Henstridge, and Nick Blood. Recurring guest star Ruth Negga reprises the role of Raina.

"...Ye Who Enter Here" originally aired on ABC on December 2, 2014, and according to Nielsen Media Research, was watched by 5.36 million viewers. The episode received mostly positive reviews, with most critics finding it a good penultimate episode for the first half of the season.

== Plot ==
Skye has been having nightmares, and cannot shake the feeling that something bad is about to happen. S.H.I.E.L.D. Director Phil Coulson wants to get to the hidden alien city as fast as possible, and destroy it, before Hydra can get there with the Obelisk. In Vancouver, Hydra agents led by Agent 33 (who, after being electrocuted by S.H.I.E.L.D. Agent Melinda May while wearing a nano-mask that gave her May's face and voice, now looks and sounds like May permanently, except for a horrible scar on her face, and a more electronic-sounding voice) are closing in on Raina, but she is protected by S.H.I.E.L.D. agents Billy and Sam Koenig. Coulson decides to split up the group, sending May, Skye, and Lance Hunter to collect Raina and the Koenigs, and taking agents Bobbi Morse, Leo Fitz, Jemma Simmons, and Alphonso "Mack" Mackenzie with him to San Juan, Puerto Rico, below which is the alien city.

On the way, Mack questions Morse about the relationship she has been rekindling with Hunter, asking her if she will let Hunter in on "the other thing", which she says she will not. Simmons tries to open up to Fitz about her feelings for him, wanting to explain that he is her best friend, but before she can he tells her that he is leaving the Science division to work with Mack in the garage, feeling that he is just getting in her way. In San Juan, Morse is concerned that Coulson wants to use the power of the Obelisk for himself, as that is what previous Director Nick Fury would do. Coulson assures her that he isn't Fury, and that unlike Fury, he has an "acceptable losses" number of zero. A contact of Morse's then directs them to an old guard tower, said to be above an entrance shaft to the city, but leaves due to stories that the tower is haunted.

When Skye tells Raina that Hydra has the Obelisk, Raina realizes that they want her because she is "worthy" of its power, and could take it to the alien city. Wanting to do this to find out what she could become, Raina attempts to give herself up to Hydra, but is prevented by the S.H.I.E.L.D. agents. En route to San Juan, Raina tells Skye that her father, a crazy murderer now aligned with Hydra, is quite misunderstood. She claims that he found her in Thailand when she was a lost soul, and showed her that she could be something else. However, all he ever wanted was to be with Skye. Raina also explains that the Obelisk, or the Diviner, was left on Earth by the alien race the Kree to decide who is worthy to inherit Earth. Only one of these people, like Raina and potentially Skye, can go to the city with the Diviner and unlock its true power. Realizing that those not worthy should probably not enter the city, Skye attempts to warn Coulson and his team, but their communications are jammed by Hydra, who had followed a tracker embedded in Raina. S.H.I.E.L.D. traitor Grant Ward boards the plane and takes Raina and Skye, as well as the coordinates for the city, before promising not to harm anyone else.

In San Juan, not knowing of the potential danger, Mack is lowered down to the city. He touches a symbol on the ground, and it starts glowing, causing great pain for him. The team pulls Mack back up, but he is overcome with rage, his eyes turn red, and he attacks them. Morse manages to subdue him, and he falls back down the shaft to the city. Coulson then orders the entrance be blocked off.

In an end tag, Agent 33 tells Hydra leader Daniel Whitehall that Ward let the other S.H.I.E.L.D. agents go, and Whitehall tells her to rectify this mistake.

== Production ==
=== Development ===
In November 2014, Marvel announced that the ninth episode of the season would be titled "...Ye Who Enter Here", to be written by Paul Zbyszewski, with Billy Gierhart directing.

=== Writing ===
Explaining Skye's nightmare at the beginning of the episode, executive producer Maurissa Tancharoen stated, "She's having some gut feelings and they are manifesting in her dreams. Are the dreams foreshadowing something? Perhaps." Executive producer Jed Whedon added, "Mainly, they serve to show how afraid she is of all of this. In the audience's mind, there's a little bit of a sense of not obsession, but her interest in this lifelong journey of finding her parents. All of this is tied together emotionally." Going on to explain Skye's mindset when she hugs Coulson before he leaves for the city, Tancharoen said, "When we first met Skye, she's always been someone who goes off of instinct and impulse. Through the course of this season, in her training with May, she's toned that down and learned how to be an agent, suppressed emotion and been there for the fight first. It's a nice moment that brings us back to the old Skye and the heart of her relationship with Coulson, which will always have elements of a father–daughter relationship. For some reason, she feels more concerned than usual about this mission, so she gives him a hug. It's just a nice way to see that she's that old Skye that acts on impulse and wants to show she cares."

=== Casting ===
In November 2014, Marvel revealed that main cast members Clark Gregg, Ming-Na Wen, Brett Dalton, Chloe Bennet, Iain De Caestecker, Elizabeth Henstridge, and Nick Blood would star as Phil Coulson, Melinda May, Grant Ward, Skye, Leo Fitz, Jemma Simmons, and Lance Hunter, respectively. It was also revealed that the guest cast for the episode would include B. J. Britt as Antoine Triplett, Adrianne Palicki as Bobbi Morse, Henry Simmons as Alphonso "Mack" Mackenzie, Ruth Negga as Raina, Patton Oswalt as Billy and Sam Koenig, Reed Diamond as Daniel Whitehall, Jeffrey Corbett as Chad, and Brittnee Garza as Cashier. However, Corbett and Garza did not receive guest star credit in the episode. Britt, Palicki, Simmons, Negga, Oswalt, and Diamond all reprise their roles from earlier in the series. Ming-Na Wen also portrays Agent 33.

=== Marvel Cinematic Universe tie-ins ===
Raina reveals in the episode that the alien corpse seen in the first season episode "T.A.H.I.T.I." is that of a Kree. Other members of that species play significant roles in the 2014 film Guardians of the Galaxy. Asked whether this counts as the series' tie-in to Guardians, Whedon stated "It is a very far away other galaxy, so it's a little bit harder to have one of them walk into our set, so a direct tie-in is a little bit more challenging, but it's all one universe, so there's always opportunity for more. ... In Guardians, we saw parts in our universe that we hadn't explored yet, so it shows we're a part of that too."

== Release ==
=== Broadcast ===
"...Ye Who Enter Here" was first aired in the United States on ABC on December 2, 2014. It was aired alongside the US broadcast in Canada on CTV.

=== Home media ===
The episode began streaming on Netflix on June 11, 2015, and was released along with the rest of the second season on September 18, 2015, on Blu-ray and DVD. The episode, along with the rest of the series, was removed from Netflix on February 28, 2022, and later became available on Disney+ on March 16, 2022.

== Reception ==
=== Ratings ===
In the United States the episode received a 1.8/5 percent share among adults between the ages of 18 and 49, meaning that it was seen by 1.8 percent of all households, and 5 percent of all of those watching television at the time of the broadcast. It was watched by 5.36 million viewers. The Canadian broadcast gained 2.20 million viewers, the second highest for that day, and the sixth highest for the week.

=== Critical response ===
Nerdist's Joseph McCabe criticized the "terrible cliffhanger", but said "I'll take awkward cliffhangers tacked onto jet-propelled episodes any day over the boring consistency of S.H.I.E.L.D.'s freshman year." Oliver Sava graded the episode a "B+" for The A.V. Club, calling the Fitz and Simmons scenes "The major character work this week", and on which saying "Elizabeth Henstridge and Iain De Caestecker's chemistry really solidified the relationship between the characters, which makes their breakup all the more painful." Sava was critical of Gierhart's directing and Bennet's acting for the opening dream sequence, but felt that they "both fare better when it comes to the waking world, particularly the action sequence[s]", which he felt made good use of close-quarter situations. Eric Goldman of IGN scored the episode a 7.9 out of 10, indicating a "Good" episode, praising the Fitz and Simmons interactions, saying "Fitz telling Simmons he no longer will work in the lab was given added weight by Iain De Caestecker and Elizabeth Henstridge, with the latter providing some heartbreaking emotions and tears on her face over the situation." He was critical of the Koenig brothers humor, which he found "forced", and lamented the lack of Kyle MacLachlan's "The Doctor", "even as he was talked about a lot."

Kevin Fitzpatrick at ScreenCrush felt "it was important that the series stick the landing on the final two episodes of season 2's front half, and while we expect the story threads to pay off more handsomely next week, "Ye Who Enter Here" ended up feeling a little lighter for it ... If nothing else, the brisk pace and impressive action choreography throughout the hour kept things humming along nicely enough". He was pleased that Fitz and Simmons talked about their feelings, but said "it seems almost as though "Ye Who Enter Here" wasn't quite ready to deal with any actual ramifications of the feelings gap between the pair". He ultimately said "Memorable moments like Koenig's umbrella cloak or Skye's extended fight with Agent 33 offer acceptable substitute for whatever cards the showrunners hold back until next week, and Ward's latest betrayal offered some intriguing wrinkles in hour that boiled down to little more than 'get to hidden city, or at least tease cryptically.'" James Hunt, writing for Den of Geek, stated "the series finally feels like it has some direction, rather than just momentum", and was pleased with Ward's actions at the end of the episode, saying "This episode did do one thing I didn't expect, though, and that's make Ward seem like a believable villain. The scene where he entered the plane worked because he had the power, and they respected it." Alan Sepinwall of HitFix called the episode "another solid, engaging installment, and a good set-up for whatever's coming next week." "[E]ven with all the characters and bits of business to deal with, the episode never felt overcrowded or rushed, and was able to focus on the character element that's made season 2 such a huge improvement over season 1." He particularly praised Palicki, and the way Raina's exposition scenes did not come across as "massive exposition dump[s]".
