= Absolution (Agents of S.H.I.E.L.D.) =

- Agents of S.H.I.E.L.D. episode
- Episode no.: Season 3 Episode 21
- Directed by: Billy Gierhart
- Written by: Chris Dingess; Drew Z. Greenberg
- Cinematography by: Allan Westbrook
- Editing by: Eric Litman; Michael Benni Pierce
- Original air date: May 17, 2016
- Running time: 43 minutes

Guest appearances
- John Hannah as Holden Radcliffe; Axle Whitehead as James / Hellfire; Mark Dacascos as Giyera; Natalia Cordova-Buckley as Elena "Yo-Yo" Rodriguez; Derek Phillips as O'Brien; Adrian Pasdar as Glenn Talbot

Episode chronology
← Previous "Emancipation"	Next → "Ascension"
- Agents of S.H.I.E.L.D. season 3

"Absolution" is the twenty-first episode, and first part of the two-part season finale, of the third season of the American television series Agents of S.H.I.E.L.D. Based on the Marvel Comics organization S.H.I.E.L.D., it follows Phil Coulson and his team of S.H.I.E.L.D. agents as they attempt to defeat Hive. It is set in the Marvel Cinematic Universe (MCU) and acknowledges the franchise's films. The episode was written by Chris Dingess and Drew Z. Greenberg, and directed by Billy Gierhart.

Clark Gregg reprises his role as Coulson from the film series, and is joined by series regulars Ming-Na Wen, Brett Dalton, Chloe Bennet, Iain De Caestecker, Elizabeth Henstridge, Henry Simmons, and Luke Mitchell.

"Absolution" originally aired on ABC on May 17, 2016, and according to Nielsen Media Research, was watched by 3.03 million viewers.

== Plot ==
After being set free from Hive's control, Daisy Johnson remains incarcerated and suffers withdrawal symptoms from Hive's control. Full of self-loathing, she dismisses Phil Coulson and Alphonso "Mack" Mackenzie's attempts to get her to forgive herself.

Hive commandeers a missile silo in order to launch the warhead containing the Primitive pathogen, but Melinda May, Mack, Lincoln Campbell and Elena "Yo-Yo" Rodriguez infiltrate the facility to stop him, having been provided with his location by Daisy. Meanwhile, Glenn Talbot and Leo Fitz manipulate the U.S. military into giving nuclear override codes to Coulson, enabling the team to prevent the warhead's launch. They also rescue Holden Radcliffe and use John Garrett's mind probe to attack Hive, bringing the memories of Grant Ward, Will Daniels and Nathaniel Malick to the forefront of his mind. A disoriented Hive is then captured by S.H.I.E.L.D. using Advanced Threat Containment Unit (ATCU) cryogenic suspension, but J. T. James and Giyera escape with the warhead.

Despite his insistence that the pathogen's effects cannot be reversed, Radcliffe agrees to work with Fitz and Jemma Simmons to find a way to cure the Primitives, while the rest of S.H.I.E.L.D. focuses on locating Hive's acolytes and the warhead. While Fitz (having just found Mack's mislaid crucifix) ensures Hive is secure, Giyera remotely detonates a gas bomb smuggled into the Playground, which releases the pathogen into the hangar, transforming five agents into Primitives. Fitz escapes but the Primitives free Hive, who seizes the Zephyr, intending to use it to bring the pathogen into the upper atmosphere. At the mercy of her craving, Daisy escapes her cell, reaches the hangar, and begs Hive to control her again.

== Production ==
=== Development ===
In April 2016, Marvel announced that the twenty-first episode of the season would be titled "Absolution", to be written by Chris Dingess and Drew Z. Greenberg, with Billy Gierhart directing. The episode was originally titled "Forgiven".

=== Casting ===
In April 2016, Marvel revealed that main cast members Clark Gregg, Ming-Na Wen, Brett Dalton, Chloe Bennet, Iain De Caestecker, Elizabeth Henstridge, Nick Blood, Adrianne Palicki, Henry Simmons, and Luke Mitchell would star as Phil Coulson, Melinda May, Hive, Daisy Johnson, Leo Fitz, Jemma Simmons, Lance Hunter, Bobbi Morse, Alphonso "Mack" Mackenzie, and Lincoln Campbell, respectively. It was also revealed that the guest cast for the episode would include Axle Whitehead as James, John Hannah as Holden Radcliffe, Natalia Cordova-Buckley as Elena "Yo-Yo" Rodriguez, Mark Dacascos as Giyera, Adrian Pasdar as Brigadier General Glenn Talbot, Derek Phillips as Agent O'Brien, Patrick John Hurley as General Andaz, Dorian Gregory as Undersecretary Walter Thomas and Hart Turner as Hudson. Hurley, Gregory, and Turner did not receive guest star credit in the episode. Whitehead, Hannah, Cordova-Buckley, Dacascos, Pasdar, and Phillips reprise their roles from earlier in the series. Blood and Palicki do not ultimately appear.

Noelle Mabry, Frank Moran, and Ralph Lammie, contestants on the "reality" web series Agents of S.H.I.E.L.D.: Academy, make cameo appearances as S.H.I.E.L.D. agents in the episode.

== Broadcast ==
"Absolution" was first aired in the United States on ABC on May 17, 2016, as part of the two-hour third season finale.

== Reception ==
=== Ratings ===
In the United States the episode received a 1.0/4 percent share among adults between the ages of 18 and 49, meaning that it was seen by 1.0 percent of all households, and 4 percent of all of those watching television at the time of the broadcast. It was watched by 3.03 million viewers.
