= Ascension (Agents of S.H.I.E.L.D.) =

- Agents of S.H.I.E.L.D. episode
- Episode no.: Season 3 Episode 22
- Directed by: Kevin Tancharoen
- Written by: Jed Whedon
- Cinematography by: Allan Westbrook
- Editing by: Joshua Charson; Jennifer MacFarlane
- Original air date: May 17, 2016
- Running time: 43 minutes

Guest appearances
- John Hannah as Holden Radcliffe; Axle Whitehead as James / Hellfire; Mark Dacascos as Giyera; Natalia Cordova-Buckley as Elena "Yo-Yo" Rodriguez; Lola Glaudini as Polly Hinton; Amanda Rea as the voice of AIDA

Episode chronology
← Previous "Absolution"	Next → "The Ghost"
- Agents of S.H.I.E.L.D. season 3

"Ascension" is the twenty-second episode, and second part of the two-part season finale, of the third season of the American television series Agents of S.H.I.E.L.D. Based on the Marvel Comics organization S.H.I.E.L.D., it follows Phil Coulson and his team of S.H.I.E.L.D. agents as they attempt to defeat Hive. It is set in the Marvel Cinematic Universe (MCU) and acknowledges the franchise's films. The episode was written by Jed Whedon, and directed by Kevin Tancharoen.

Clark Gregg reprises his role as Coulson from the film series, and is joined by series regulars Ming-Na Wen, Brett Dalton, Chloe Bennet, Iain De Caestecker, Elizabeth Henstridge, Henry Simmons, and Luke Mitchell.

This is the last episode to feature Dalton and Mitchell as series regulars.

"Ascension" originally aired on ABC on May 17, 2016, and according to Nielsen Media Research, was watched by 3.03 million viewers.

== Plot ==
Following directly on from "Absolution", Daisy Johnson begs Hive to control her again, but Lash's powers have rendered her immune. She instead attacks Hive but is defeated and captured as James and Giyera arrive, and they escape in the Zephyr. However Melinda May and Leo Fitz stow away onboard and rescue Daisy, and Fitz kills Giyera.

Most of the Primitives remain behind to fight the S.H.I.E.L.D. agents, and Elena Rodriguez intercepts a bullet meant for Alphonso "Mack" Mackenzie and is almost killed, but Jemma Simmons realizes that the Primitives' eyesight uses light on the infrared spectrum and so masks the presence of the agents by raising the ambient temperature of the room. The agents are then able to defeat the Primitives. After taking Elena and Holden Radcliffe to safety, Phil Coulson, Simmons, Mack and Lincoln Campbell pursue the Zephyr in a quinjet, planning to steal the warhead containing the Primitive pathogen and send it into space aboard the quinjet, to disperse the pathogen harmlessly. Lincoln defeats James but is badly wounded, and Daisy, having found the crucifix in Fitz's jacket, decides to fulfil her vision of a S.H.I.E.L.D. agent's death in space by flying the quinjet to make sure nothing goes wrong.

While Coulson, May, Fitz, Simmons and Mack fight the remaining Primitives, Hive pursues Daisy aboard the quinjet, but Lincoln (having stolen the crucifix) gets on board, fries the manual control system and ejects Daisy. He then flies the plane into space, professing his love for Daisy over the communications system, and the warhead detonates, killing him and Hive while dispersing the pathogen harmlessly in space. The human race is saved, but Daisy is left heartbroken.

A flashforward to six months later reveals that Daisy has left S.H.I.E.L.D. and begun operating as a vigilante, dubbed "Quake" by the press. Coulson (no longer S.H.I.E.L.D.'s director) and Mack almost track her down as she arranges the relocation of Charles Hinton's wife Polly and daughter Robin, but she escapes after directing Polly to Cal's veterinary practice. Radcliffe is revealed to have been working on a robotics project, the "Life Model Decoy", as part of which he uploads his artificial intelligence AIDA into the prototype android.

== Production ==
=== Development ===
In April 2016, Kevin Tancharoen revealed that he would be directing the season's finale, and was "just starting to dive into the treatment and the outline and the script and everything and just getting into it". Later in the month, Marvel announced that the episode (the twenty-second of the season) would be titled "Ascension", and would be written by executive producer Jed Whedon.

=== Writing ===
Actress Chloe Bennet said ahead of the episode's release, "This is the end of a chapter—more than a chapter; this might be the end of the first book of S.H.I.E.L.D. This finale feels like the end of something bigger and the beginning of a whole new tone for the show. It's completely nonstop. It's shocking and it's also just really sad."

With the series having been teasing the impending death of a major character, in the possession of a golden cross and S.H.I.E.L.D. jacket at the time, the executive producers confirmed that the season's final episode would feature the death. They revealed before the airing of the episode that they would "play a game of hot potato" with the items to keep the identity of the dying character a mystery for as long as possible. Actor Clark Gregg said of the cast's experience with this aspect of the script, "We were very aware when someone would pick up the cross. There's a lot of sleight of hand with the cross. You don't want to be the last person holding the cross." Whedon discussed the cross as a symbol in the script, saying, "We like that the hot potato of death is this delicate little cross. We're fighting the devil; it's a question of faith." He also admitted that "some of the potato-tossing in the finale is just to mess with viewers": "Some of it's pretty meaningful as it passes hands, and some of it's painful for the audience."

After the episode reveals Lincoln Campbell to be the "Fallen Agent", the executive producers said that they felt the character earned his "heroic" death after the way he had developed throughout the season. His final scene with Daisy Johnson, where they say goodbye over radios, was not an intentional homage to the similar scene between Captain America and Peggy Carter in Marvel's Captain America: The First Avenger, with the crew independently deciding to use the scenario because "There's something heartbreaking about not being able to be face-to-face with the person." For the six-month time jump at the end of the episode, executive producer Maurissa Tancharoen called it "a spin on our usual cliffhanger", with Whedon explaining that the series would have picked up six months later for the fourth season anyway, "we just wanted to do it a little early" this time. The tease at the end of the episode, which hints at Life Model Decoys (LMD), was originally meant to tease the introduction of Johnny Blaze / Ghost Rider, a character the producers hoped to use in the fourth season and had received clearance from Marvel to do so. However, Marvel would rescind the series' ability to use Johnny Blaze, resulting in the change to the LMD tease; the series would ultimately be able to use the Robbie Reyes version of the character.

=== Casting ===
In April 2016, Marvel revealed that main cast members Clark Gregg, Ming-Na Wen, Brett Dalton, Chloe Bennet, Iain De Caestecker, Elizabeth Henstridge, Nick Blood, Adrianne Palicki, Henry Simmons, and Luke Mitchell would star as Phil Coulson, Melinda May, Hive, Daisy Johnson, Leo Fitz, Jemma Simmons, Lance Hunter, Bobbi Morse, Alphonso "Mack" Mackenzie, and Lincoln Campbell, respectively. It was also revealed that the guest cast for the episode would include Axle Whitehead as James, John Hannah as Holden Radcliffe, Natalia Cordova-Buckley as Elena "Yo-Yo" Rodriguez, Mark Dacascos as Giyera, Lola Glaudini as Polly Hinton and Amanda Rea as AIDA. Rea did not receive guest star credit in the episode. Whitehead, Hannah, Cordova-Buckley, Dacascos, and Glaudini reprise their roles from earlier in the series. Blood and Palicki do not ultimately appear.

== Broadcast ==
"Ascension" was first aired in the United States on ABC on May 17, 2016, as part of the two-hour third season finale.

== Reception ==
=== Ratings ===
In the United States the episode received a 1.0/4 percent share among adults between the ages of 18 and 49, meaning that it was seen by 1.0 percent of all households, and 4 percent of all of those watching television at the time of the broadcast. It was watched by 3.03 million viewers.
