= Natalia Cordova-Buckley =

Mexican actress

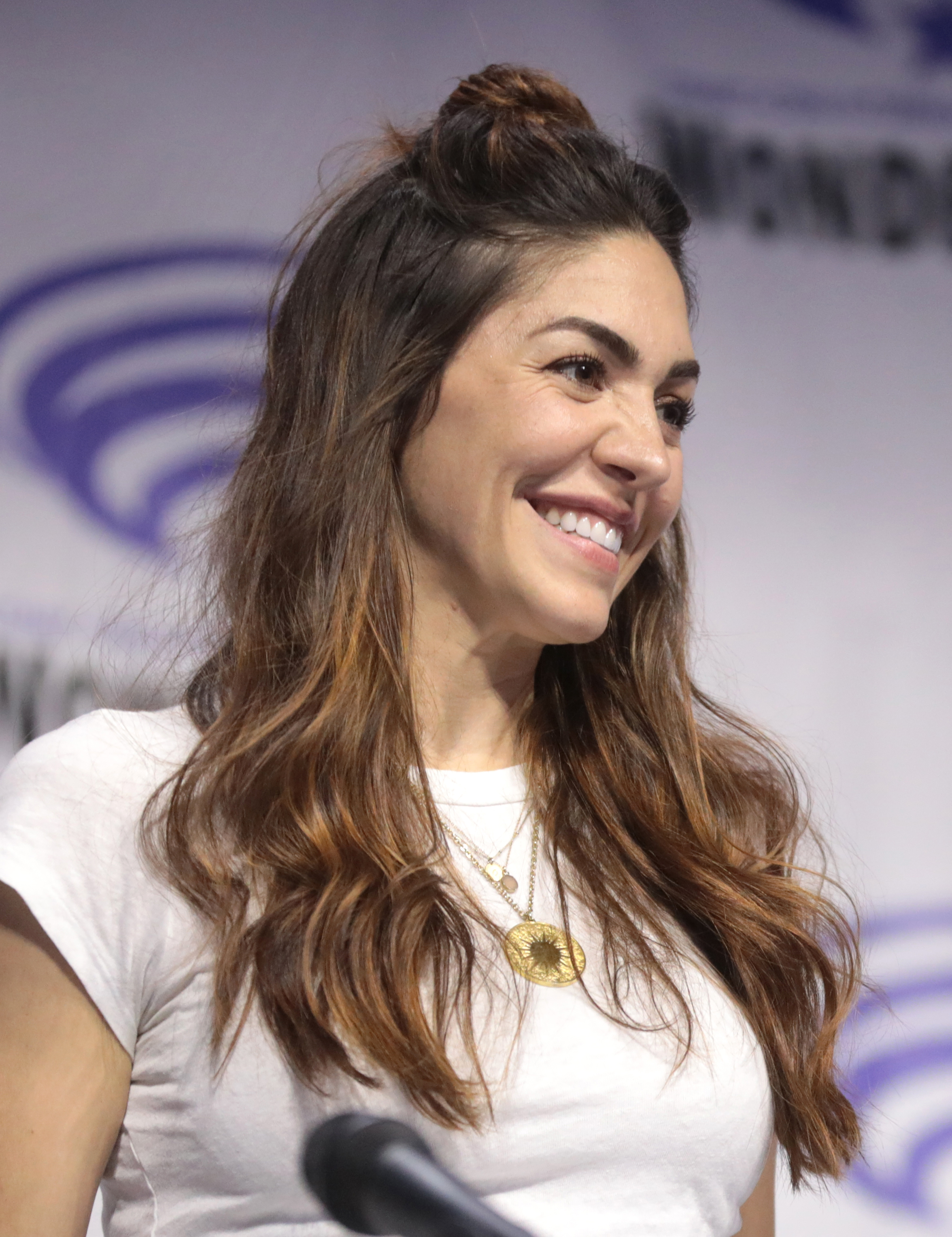
- Cordova-Buckley in March 2019
- Born: Mexico City, Mexico
- Education: California Institute of the Arts
- Occupation: Actress
- Years active: 2008–present
- Spouse: Brian Buckley (m. 2011)
- Relatives: Pancho Córdova (grandfather)

Natalia Cordova-Buckley is a Mexican actress. She is best known for starring as Elena "Yo-Yo" Rodriguez / Slingshot in the ABC superhero drama series Agents of S.H.I.E.L.D. (2013–2020).

== Early life ==
Cordova-Buckley was born in Mexico City and raised in Cancún. Her grandfather was Pancho Córdova, an actor in Mexican and American cinema, whom she never met.

Cordova-Buckley was classically trained as a ballet dancer, training under Fernando Alonso in the dance company Centro de Arte Siglo XXI. Finding the occupation too restricting, she decided to become an actress instead. She had reconsidered acting after trying to avoid it due to being teased about her voice in her youth. She stated: "the kids wouldn’t chase me around when we played tag because they would say that I screamed like a Godzilla. It wasn’t just my voice, but [also] the fact that I have a pretty strong personality and was always very outspoken and opinionated."

At the age of 17, she moved to the U.S. after getting accepted to the drama department of the University of North Carolina School of the Arts, a high school program for seniors in fine arts. After graduating, she attended the theatre conservatory at the California Institute of the Arts.

== Career ==
Cordova-Buckley made her acting debut in Mexican comedy-drama series Los simuladores (2008–2009). This was followed by supporting roles in numerous Spanish-language films, such as Sucedió en un día (2010) and Lluvia de Luna (2011). She earned her first major leading role in the drama film Ventanas al mar (2012), opposite veteran actors Charo López and Fernando Guillén.

Cordova-Buckley earned her first American acting role in the sports drama film McFarland, USA (2015), opposite Kevin Costner. She almost quit acting before winning the role of Elena "Yo-Yo" Rodriguez in the ABC superhero drama series Agents of S.H.I.E.L.D. (2013–2020), gaining further recognition in the process. During the series' fourth season, she headlined a 6-episode miniseries, Agents of S.H.I.E.L.D.: Slingshot, which debuted online on December 13, 2016. The series was nominated for the Primetime Emmy Award for Outstanding Short Form Comedy or Drama Series.

In 2017, she guest starred as attorney Julia Ramos in the A&E horror drama series Bates Motel, where she worked opposite Vera Farmiga and Freddie Highmore. Also that year, she voiced the role of artist Frida Kahlo in the Disney-Pixar animated musical film Coco, which went on to win the Academy Award for Best Animated Feature.

In 2018, Cordova-Buckley portrayed Det. Gavras in the crime thriller film Destroyer, opposite Nicole Kidman.

== Personal life ==
Cordova-Buckley has been married to musician and actor Brian Buckley since 2011. Together, the couple reside in Los Angeles. They have two dogs.

One of her inspirations and role models was artist Frida Kahlo, whom she portrayed in Coco.

== Filmography ==
=== Film ===
Year	Title	Role	Notes
2010	Sucedió en un día	Natalia	
2011	Lluvia de Luna	Martha	
2011	Ella y el candidato	Andrea	
2012	Ventanas al mar	Ana	
2014	Yerbamala	Bárbara	
2015	McFarland, USA	Señora Valles	
2015	Vámonos	Del	Short film
2016	Icebox	Gabriela Fernandez	Short film
2017	Welcome Back	Carmen	Short film
2017	Coco	Frida Kahlo (voice)	
2018	Destroyer	Det. Gavras	
2023	The Portrait	Sofia	

=== Television ===
Year	Title	Role	Notes
2008–2009	Los simuladores	Natalia	6 episodes
2008	Terminales	Rita	2 episodes
2010	Los minondo	Isabel	Main role; 10 episodes
2011	Bienes raíces	Olga	4 episodes
2016–2020	Agents of S.H.I.E.L.D.	Elena "Yo-Yo" Rodriguez	Main role; 61 episodes
2016	Agents of S.H.I.E.L.D.: Academy	Herself	Episode: "Commencement"
2016	Agents of S.H.I.E.L.D.: Slingshot	Elena "Yo-Yo" Rodriguez	Lead role; 6 episodes
2017	Bates Motel	Julia Ramos	2 episodes
2021	Mayans M.C.	Laura	4 episodes
2021	Coyote	Paloma Zamora	3 episodes
2022	Winning Time: The Rise of the Lakers Dynasty	Lucía	Season 1
2022-2023	The Mosquito Coast	Isela	Season 2, 10 episodes
