= Jonathan Antoine =

English tenor (born 1995)

- Born: 13 January 1995 (age 31); Essex, England
- Genres: Classical, operatic, adult contemporary, musical theatre
- Years active: 2012–present
- Labels: Syco, Sony Classical, Cavendish
- Website: jonathanantoinemusic.com

Jonathan Antoine (born 13 January 1995) is an English classically trained tenor. He rose to fame after appearing on the sixth series of Britain's Got Talent in 2012 as half of the classical duo Jonathan and Charlotte. He subsequently went solo and his debut album, Tenore, was released in the UK on 13 October 2014. His follow-up album, Believe, was released on 19 August 2016, and on 5 June 2020 he then released his third album Going the Distance. Jonathan co-authored two children’s books, Jonathan the Porcupine and Jonathan and the Magical Cape.

In 2023, Antoine revealed that he is Autistic.

== Early life ==
Antoine was born to John, a police inspector, and Tracy, a housewife, in Hainault, Essex. He has an older sister, Charlotte.

At the age of 11, Antoine enrolled at West Hatch High School in Chigwell and met singing coach Jenny Ewington and head of music Ginette Brown. He said, "I started having lessons with Mrs Ewington and just took to it. It was so nurturing. She was inspirational and she became a fantastic friend." After Antoine's voice broke around the age of 13, Ewington selected "Bring Him Home" from Les Misérables for him to perform at the 2010 Stratford and East London Music Festival, where he was named the Young Musician of The Year. He sang "Ave Maria" at the Royal Festival Hall in London as part of the Rotary Youth Makes Music event in 2011. At 14, Antoine auditioned for a junior place at the four major music conservatories in London. After being accepted at all of them, he chose the Royal Academy of Music. At West Hatch, Brown encouraged him into concert singing to help him overcome his shyness. "Jonathan came into his own," she said. "All the students would see him and say that he was the boy with the incredible voice."

== Career ==
=== 2012–2014: Jonathan and Charlotte ===
Along with Charlotte Jaconelli, Antoine sang "The Prayer" at Ginette Brown's wedding in 2011. It was at this time that the duo Charlotte and Jonathan began.

In 2012, an audition video of the duo was sent to the talent show Britain's Got Talent. Antoine and Jaconelli performed together in the Series 6 auditions held in London, which was broadcast on 24 March 2012. Performing as "Charlotte and Jonathan," they sang "The Prayer" and advanced to the semi-final round, which was held on 7 May 2012. The duo sang "Caruso", written by Lucio Dalla, and advanced to the final round. They were the 11th act to perform in the final round, which was held on 12 May 2012, and they again performed "The Prayer." They received a standing ovation and finished second to the dancing dog act Ashleigh and Pudsey.

On 13 May 2012, the day after the Britain's Got Talent final, it was confirmed that Simon Cowell was in negotiations to offer the duo a £1 million recording contract with his record label, Syco. They accepted and released their debut album, Together, on 24 September 2012 in the UK and 30 October 2012 in the US. After moving from SyCo/Columbia Records to Sony Classical, their second album, Perhaps Love, was released on 14 October 2013. It was described as an album of covers that also contained classical songs and interpretations of modern songs.

=== 2014–present: Solo career ===
In February 2014, the duo split up after both were offered solo record deals. In a statement on their website, they said:

We have had the most exciting journey together ever since meeting at West Hatch High School in 2006 and are so happy for each other. To come second on BGT and sell over quarter of a million albums was beyond our wildest dreams. To now be offered our own solo record deals by Sony Classical is the most exciting thing ever and we are thrilled to be going back into the recording studio so soon. For those that voted for us, bought our CDs and saw us in concert – thank you. We hope to see you soon at our own shows. Love Jonathan and Charlotte.

Antoine performed in an album pre-release tour of the UK, followed by an appearance at the closing concert of iTunes Festival 2014 at the invitation of Plácido Domingo. He started a solo career in the United States and performed at the 2014 Muhammad Ali Celebrity Fight Night in Arizona, California and Florida.

Antoine's debut solo album, Tenore (Italian for Tenor), was released in the UK on 13 October 2014. It contains a selection of classic songs as well as arias. The album was produced by Anna Barry, who has worked with Andrea Bocelli, José Carreras, the Kirov Opera and Andrew Lloyd Webber. One reviewer said, "Here is a new star on the vocal scene and his first solo album attests to his miraculous talent." Antoine added two previously unreleased tracks to his list on Tenore available for international download through Amazon and iTunes in time for Mother's Day 2016 in the UK.

On 19 August 2016, Antoine released his second album, Believe. It contains classical arias by Puccini, as well as a version of the classic Leonard Cohen song "Hallelujah" and new music by British classical composer Chris Broom, with whom Antoine collaborated (co-wrote) the song "A New Tomorrow". The album received positive reviews on its release. Robert Cummings said, "His voice is very versatile, sufficiently powerful and has a velvety, creamy sound that is quite unique".

On 15 September 2018, Antoine performed his first solo concert in the United States in the Fred Kavli Theatre at the Thousand Oaks Civic Arts Plaza in Thousand Oaks, California. In June 2019, he performed at the Winter Garden Theatre in Canada in a three-part concert entitled Beyond the Curtain, where he sang Disney songs, American Songbook classics and opera arias, including singing "Nessun Dorma" publicly for the first time.

In May 2021 he revealed he was releasing a version of Diane Warren's 2021 song "Io sì (Seen)".

In November 2022 he launched a recording project with ArtistShare for an album he was working with alongside Diane Warren called By Request – The Diane Warren Songbook Vol. 1.

His eighth studio album, Speaking to You, was released in March, 2026.

== Discography ==
=== Albums ===
Title	Album details	Peak chart positions						Certifications
Title	Album details	UK	UK Class.	IRE	SCO	US Class.	US Heat.	Certifications
Together (with Charlotte Jaconelli)	Released: 24 September 2012; Label: Syco Music; Format: CD, digital download	5	—	32	7	7	5	BPI: Gold
Perhaps Love (with Charlotte Jaconelli)	Released: 14 October 2013; Label: Sony Classical (UK), Sony Masterworks (US); Format: CD, digital download	5	—	—	8	9	—	BPI: Silver
Tenore	Released: 13 October 2014; Label: Sony Classical (UK), Sony Masterworks (US); Format: CD, digital download, vinyl	13	1	—	—	7	14	
Believe (with the London Studio Symphony and James Shearman)	Released: 19 August 2016; Label: Cavendish; Format: CD, digital download, vinyl	79	1	—	—	10	—	
Going the Distance	Released: 3 April 2020; Label: Antoine Multimedia, Sony Music; Format: CD, digital download, streaming	—	—	—	—	—	—	
Christmasland	Released: October 2, 2020; Label: Loki Records, MTX Music; Format: CD, digital download, streaming	—	—	—	—	—	—	
By Request - The Diane Warren Songbook, Vol. 1	Released: 8 November, 2024; Label: ArtistShare Project (independent); Format: CD, digital download, streaming	—	—	—	—	—	—	
Speaking to You	Released: March 27, 2026; Label: Antoine Multimedia; Format: CD, album, digital download, streaming	—	—	—	—	—	—	
