= Who Let the Dogs Out? (TV series) =

British children's dog training game show

- Genre: Dog training
- Created by: Claire Gillies / Louise Brown
- Directed by: Pati Marr
- Presented by: Zak George (2011–12); Ashleigh Butler (2013–14)
- Narrated by: Rik Mayall (2011–13; his death); Iain Stirling (2014)
- Country of origin: United Kingdom
- Original language: English
- No. of series: 4
- No. of episodes: 53

Production
- Executive producer: Louise Brown / Yvonne Jennings
- Producer: Claire Gillies
- Production locations: Arley House & Gardens, Cheshire, England
- Running time: 30 minutes
- Production company: BBC Scotland

Original release
- Network: CBBC Channel
- Release: 21 September 2011 – 5 December 2014

Related
- Pet School; Who Let the Dogs Out and About?

Who Let the Dogs Out? is a British children's dog training game show that aired on CBBC since 21 September 2011. The show's name is widely derived from the song of the same name by the Bahamian junkaroo band Baha Men.

In each episode, three dogs and their child owners battle it out to take home the Who Let the Dogs Out? trophy by tackling different dog tricks at the "Dog House"; such as skateboarding, skipping, frisbee catching and walking on two legs. A second series was aired in 2012. A third and fourth series aired in 2013 and 2014, with presenters Ashleigh Butler and Steve Mann.

A spin-off series, Who Let the Dogs Out and About? aired for ten episodes, beginning on 19 January 2013.

== Episodes ==
=== Series 1 (2011) ===
Show	Original Air Date	Challenge
1	21 September 2011	Skateboarding Dogs
2	28 September 2011	Back Stall Dogs
3	5 October 2011	Dock Diving Dogs
4	12 October 2011	Frisbee Dogs
5	19 October 2011	Dancing Dogs
6	26 October 2011	Strong Dogs
7	2 November 2011	Skipping Dogs
8	9 November 2011	Maths Dogs
9	16 November 2011	Goalie Dogs
10	23 November 2011	Tempting Dogs
11	30 November 2011	Movie Dogs
12	7 December 2011	Dogs on Two Legs
13	14 December 2011	Best in Show Dogs

=== Series 2 (2012) ===
The format was slightly changed this series; only one team would win the trophy at the series finale. In every episode, two hopefuls were eliminated but one team made it through to the next round – the quarter-finals. 27 teams were chosen by Zak and the series producer, Claire Gillies, to go to the "Dog House" after the tryouts were completed.

Show	Original Air Date	Challenge	Round
1	24 September 2012	The Tryouts	Auditions
2	25 September 2012	Dogs up in the Air	Heat 1
3	26 September 2012	Dogs play Volleyball	Heat 2
4	27 September 2012	Dogs with Catapults	Heat 3
5	28 September 2012	Dogs Push Prams	Heat 4
6	1 October 2012	Dogs on Barrels	Heat 5
7	2 October 2012	Dogs on a Trampoline	Heat 6
8	3 October 2012	Dogs on the Dock	Heat 7
9	4 October 2012	Dogs do Magic	Heat 8
10	5 October 2012	Dogs on Knees	Heat 9
11	8 October 2012	Dogs Save Goals	Quarter-final 1
12	9 October 2012	Dogs Do Flyball	Quarter-final 2
13	10 October 2012	Dogs with Distractions	Quarter-final 3
14	11 October 2012	Dogs Under Pressure	Semi-final
15	12 October 2012	The Final	

- Winners: Jake and his dog Ice

=== Series 3 (2013) ===
A third series aired in 2013. Beginning on 16 September 2013, it was hosted by Ashleigh Butler, with her dog Pudsey also appearing, and Steve Mann.

Show	Original Air Date	Challenge	Round
1	16 September 2013	The Tryouts	Auditions
2	17 September 2013	Balancing Dogs	Heat 1
3	18 September 2013	High Flying Dogs	Heat 2
4	19 September 2013	Water Dogs	Heat 3
5	20 September 2013	Skater Dogs	Heat 4
6	23 September 2013	Launching Dogs	Heat 5
7	24 September 2013	Shopping Dogs	Heat 6
8	25 September 2013	Flyball Dogs	Heat 7
9	26 September 2013	Disc Dogs	Heat 8
10	27 September 2013	Jumping Dogs	Heat 9
11	30 September 2013	Dribbling Dogs	Semi-final 1
12	1 October 2013	Movie Star Dogs	Semi-final 2
13	2 October 2013	Disappearing Dogs	Semi-final 3
14	3 October 2013	The Final	
15	4 October 2013	Celebrity special (Ceallach Spellman, Katie Thistleton, Aaron Craze)	

- Winners: TBA
- Celebrity winners: TBA

=== Series 4 (2014) ===
A fourth series began airing on 24 November 2014, it was hosted by Ashleigh Butler, with her dog Pudsey also appearing, and Steve Mann.

Show	Original Air Date	Challenge	Round
1	24 November 2014		
2	25 November 2014		
3	26 November 2014		
4	27 November 2014		
5	28 November 2014		
6	1 December 2014		
7	2 December 2014		
8	3 December 2014		
9	4 December 2014		
10	5 December 2014		

- Winners: TBA

== Who Let The Dogs Out and About? ==
Who Let the Dogs Out?
- Genre: Dog training
- Directed by: Janine O'Connor
- Presented by: Kate Edmondson
- Starring: Dr Scott Miller; Ashleigh and Pudsey; Claire Gillies
- Narrated by: Rik Mayall
- Country of origin: United Kingdom
- Original language: English
- No. of series: 1
- No. of episodes: 10

Production
- Executive producer: Yvonne Jennings
- Producer: Chris Hulme
- Running time: 60 minutes (inc. Ped Squad)
- Production company: BBC Scotland

Original release
- Network: CBBC
- Release: 19 January – 23 March 2013

Related
- Who Let the Dogs Out?

Who Let the Dogs Out and About is a British 10-episode children's television programme that ran for ten episodes from 19 January to 23 March 2013. The show was filmed throughout the summer of 2012 and visited various locations within the United Kingdom.

The series was hosted by Kate Edmondson, with vet Dr Scott Miller, dog expert Claire Gillies, also the series producer of Who Let the Dogs Out?, as well as Britain's Got Talent winners Ashleigh and Pudsey. The series was aired in the 9am slot on Saturday mornings.

Each episode featured a comedy animation series called Pet Squad, which was produced by Darrall Macqueen Ltd. It was shown as a 10-minute segment of the show.

=== Episodes ===
Show	Original Air Date	Location
1	19 January 2013	Padstow & Harlyn Bay, Cornwall
2	26 January 2013	Croxteth House and Country Park, Liverpool
3	2 February 2013	Durdham Down, Bristol
4	9 February 2013	Preston Park, Brighton
5	16 February 2013	Clissold Park, London
6	23 February 2013	Rouken Glen Park, Glasgow
7	2 March 2013	Bute Park, Cardiff
8	9 March 2013	Holyrood Park, Edinburgh
9	16 March 2013	Roundhay Park, Leeds
10	23 March 2013	Central Park, Plymouth
