= Fleece =

Fleece may refer to:

== Materials ==
- Fleece, the coat of a wool-bearing animal, such as a sheep, goat, or llama, especially after being shorn
- Polar fleece, a type of proprietary polyester fabric often used in jackets
- Horticultural fleece, a polypropylene fabric used to protect plants
- To be fleeced of a woolen coat is to be shorn

== Mythology ==
- Golden Fleece, the coat of a winged ram, an element of Greek mythology

== See also ==
- Golden Fleece (disambiguation)
- Fleece Hotel, Gloucester, England
- The Fleece Inn, Worcestershire, England
- Flyssa, a traditional weapon of the Berbers
- Fleece (band), a Canadian indie rock band
- Fleeceware
