= Top Dog Model =

- Genre: Reality
- Starring: Ashleigh and Pudsey
- Judges: Stacey Solomon; Lilah Parsons; Addison Witt
- Voices of: David Walliams
- Country of origin: United Kingdom
- Original language: English
- No. of series: 1
- No. of episodes: 6

Production
- Running time: 60 minutes (inc. adverts)
- Production company: 12 Yard

Original release
- Network: ITV2
- Release: 5 September – 10 October 2012

Related
- Next Top Model

Top Dog Model is a British reality dog competition show that aired on ITV2 from 5 September to 10 October 2012. The judging panel consists of head judge Stacey Solomon, Lilah Parsons and Addison Witt. Britain's Got Talent winners Ashleigh and Pudsey feature in various episodes, demonstrating tasks and offering advice to the contestants.

== Format ==
The show aimed to find Britain's next talented canine, that starred in an ad campaign for household product Cif PowerPro Naturals.
