= List of UK Jazz & Blues Albums Chart number ones of 2019 =

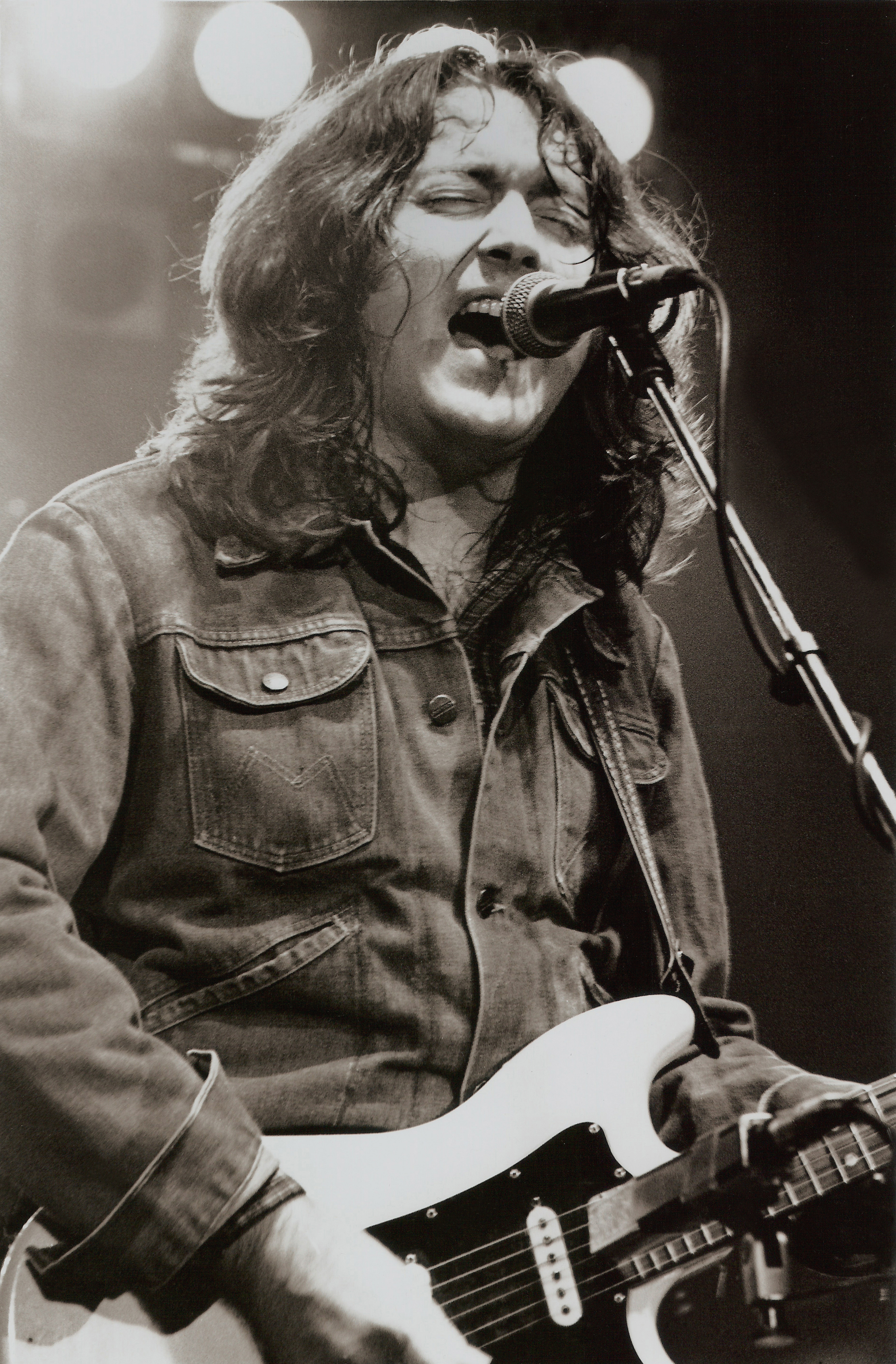
Rory Gallagher spent ten weeks atop the UK Jazz & Blues Albums Chart in 2019 with the compilation Blues, including the year's longest run of eight weeks.

The UK Jazz & Blues Albums Chart is a record chart which ranks the best-selling jazz and blues albums in the United Kingdom. Compiled and published by the Official Charts Company, the data is based on each album's weekly physical sales, digital downloads and streams. In 2019, 52 charts were published with 25 albums at number one. The first number-one album of the year was The Prophet Speaks, the 40th studio album by Northern Irish singer-songwriter Van Morrison, which topped the first three charts of January. The last number-one album of the year was Here's to Christmas, the debut album by former footballer Chris Kamara, which spent the last six weeks of 2019 atop the chart.

The most successful album on the UK Jazz & Blues Albums Chart in 2019 was Blues, a greatest hits album by Rory Gallagher, which spent a total of ten weeks at number one over two spells of eight and two weeks. Here's to Christmas was the second most successful album of the year, with its run of six consecutive weeks at the end of 2019 the second longest spell of the year behind Blues. Four different releases spent a total of three weeks each atop the chart – The Prophet Speaks by Van Morrison, Kind of Blue by jazz trumpeter Miles Davis, Reckless Heart, the seventh studio album by Joanne Shaw Taylor, and War in My Mind, the ninth solo studio album by Beth Hart.

== Chart history ==
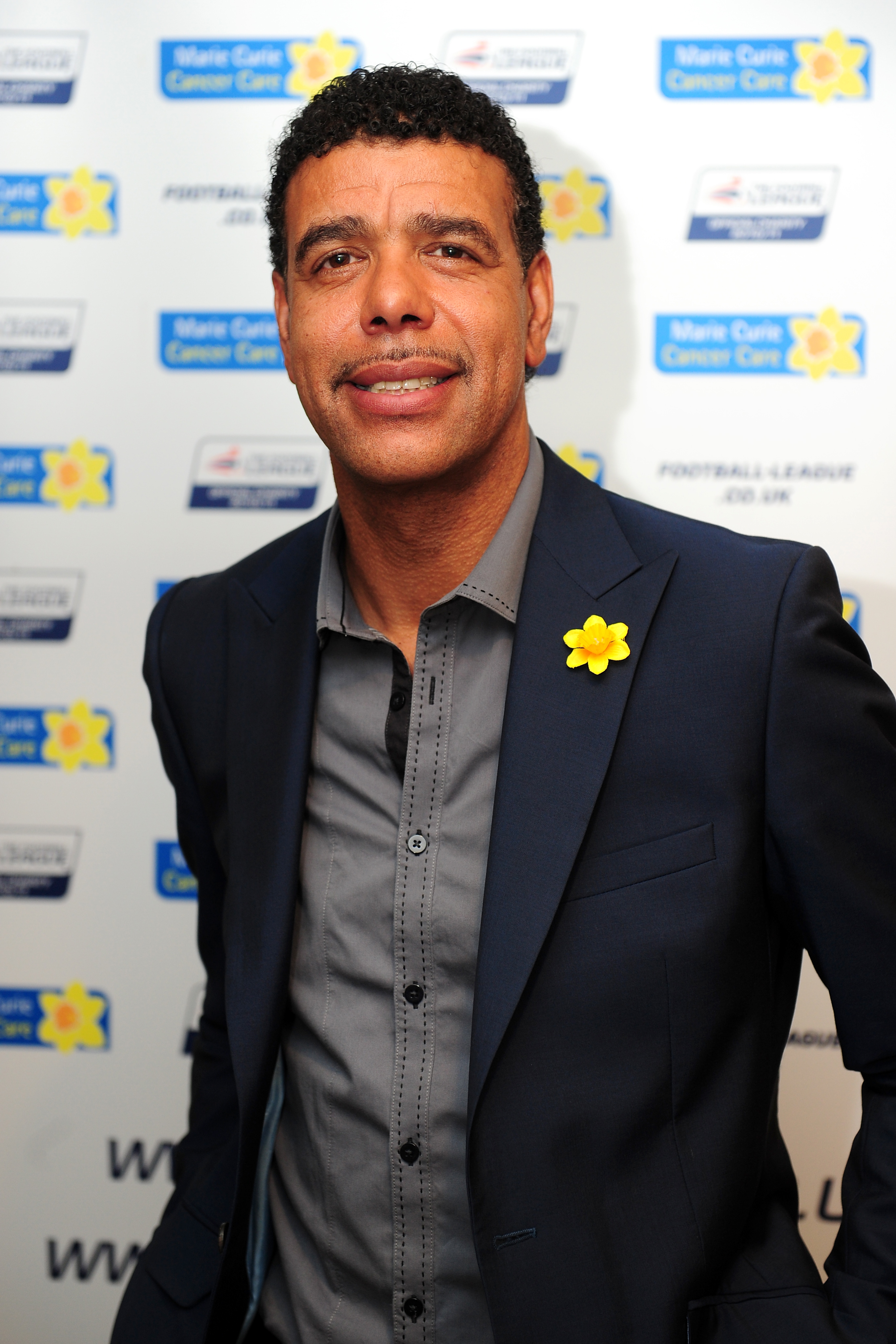
Here's to Christmas, the debut album by former footballer Chris Kamara, spent the last six weeks of 2019 at number one.

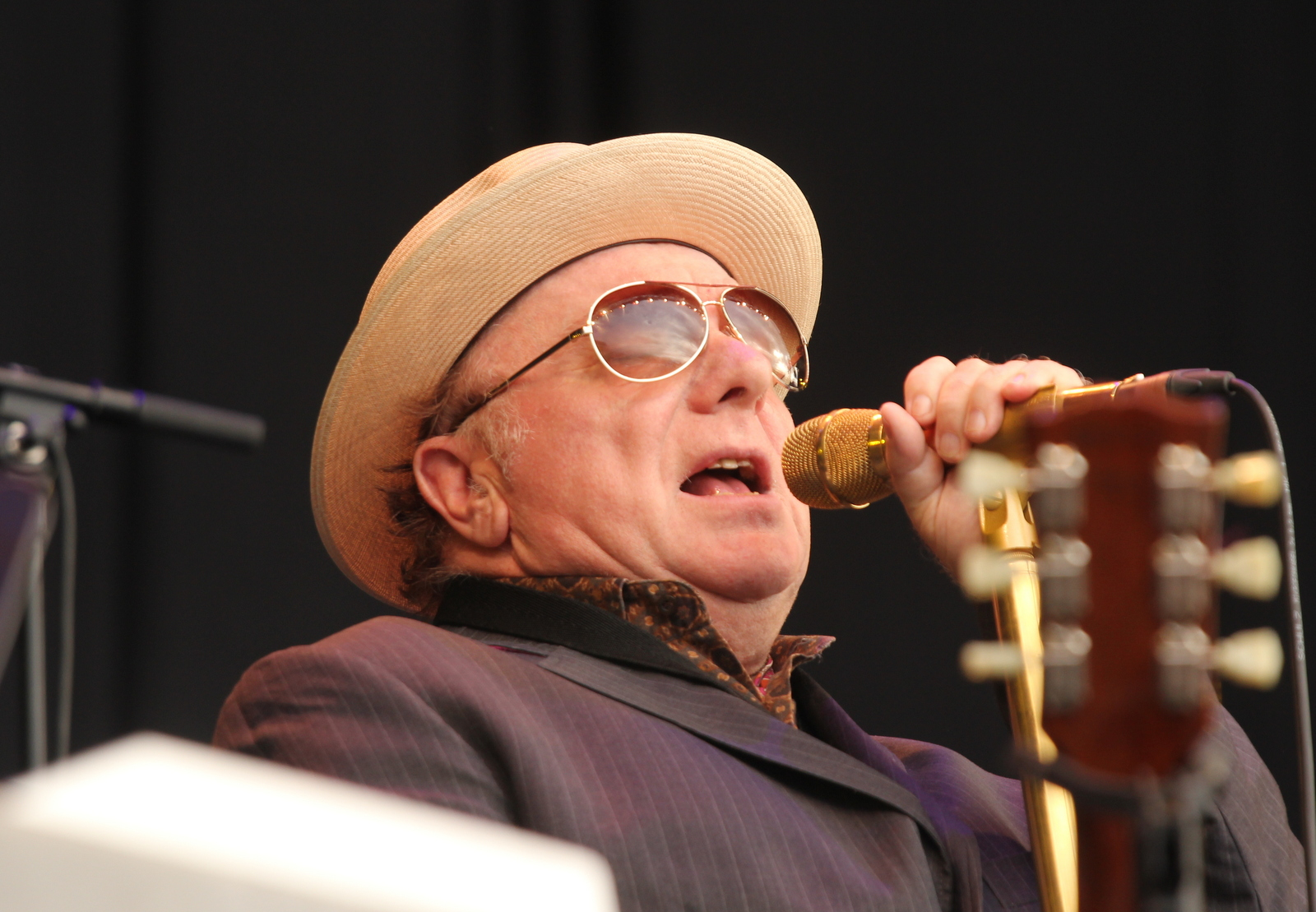
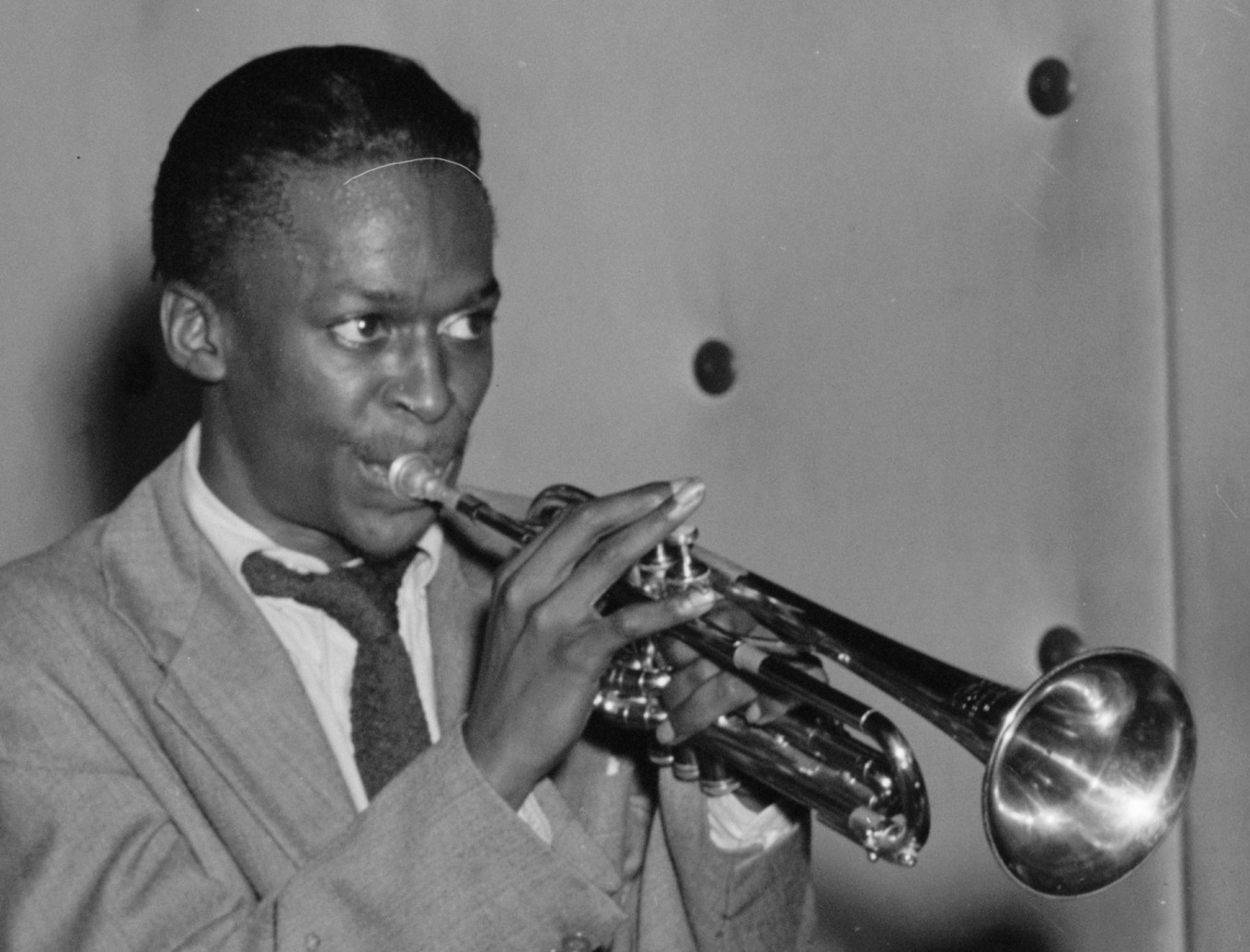
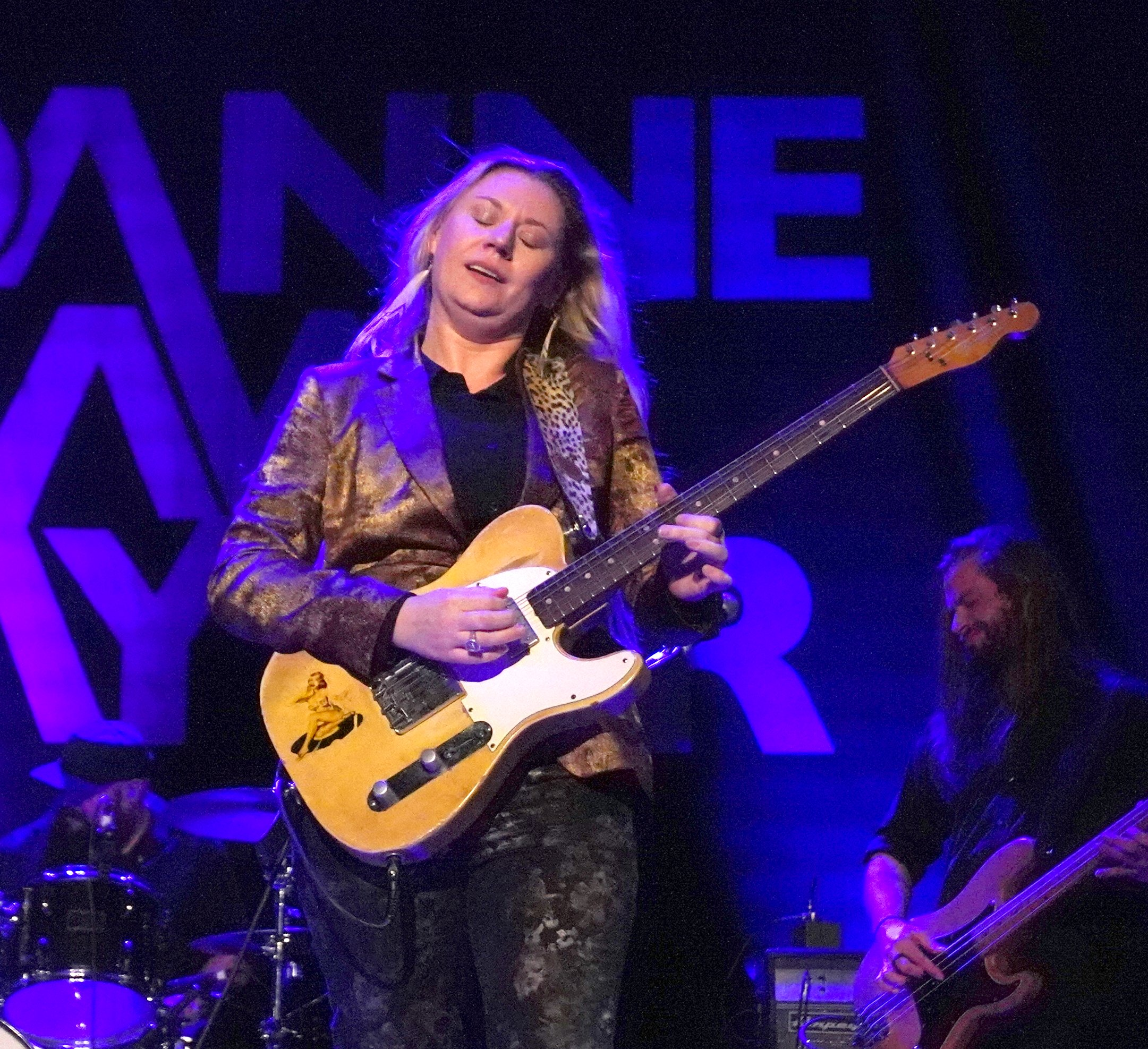
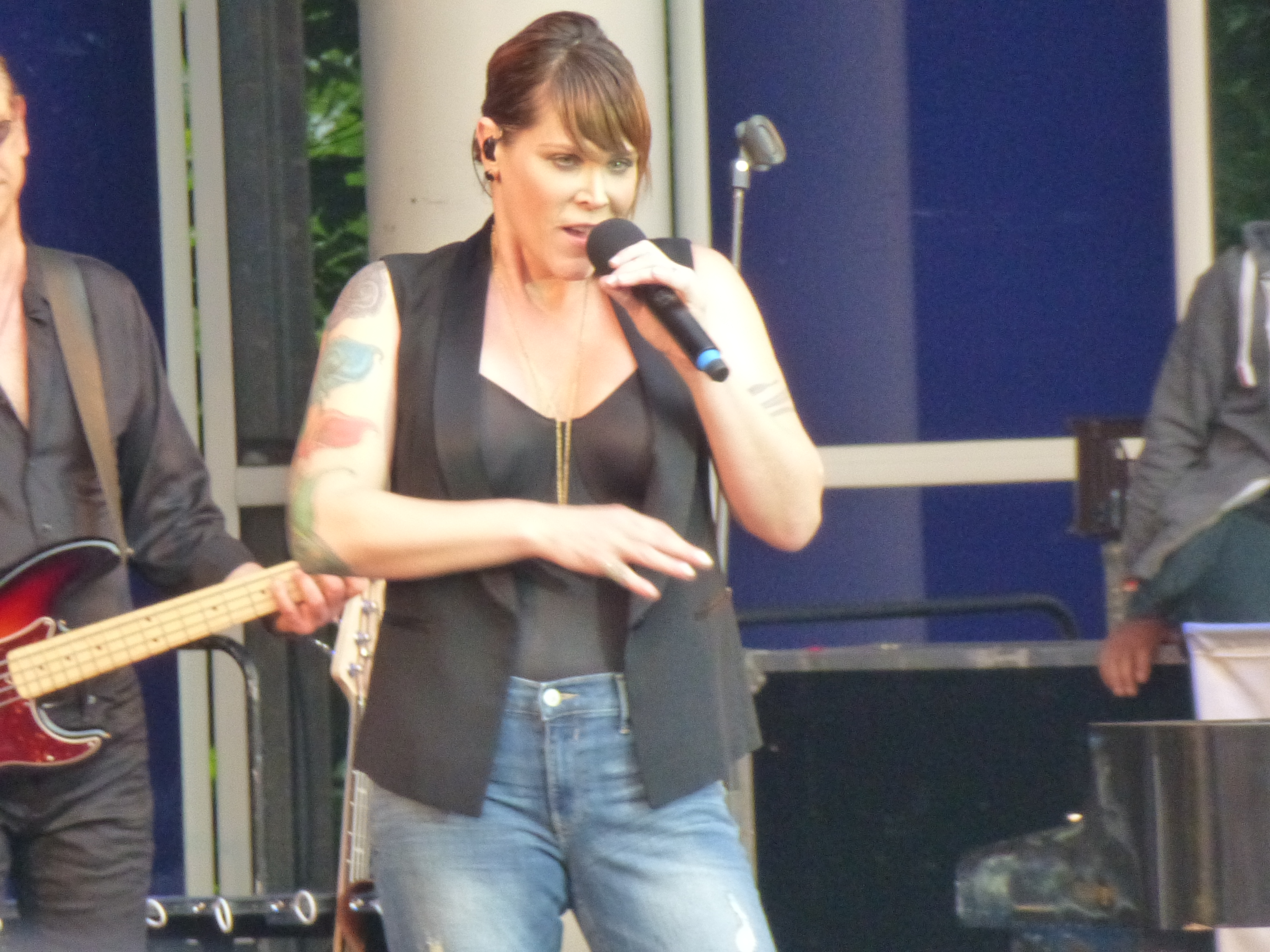
Releases by Van Morrison (top), Miles Davis (second from top), Joanne Shaw Taylor (second from bottom) and Beth Hart (bottom) each spent three weeks at number one during 2019.

Issue date	Album	Artist(s)	Record label(s)	Ref.
4 January	The Prophet Speaks	Van Morrison	Exile	
11 January	The Prophet Speaks	Van Morrison	Exile	
18 January	The Prophet Speaks	Van Morrison	Exile	
25 January	Kind of Blue	Miles Davis	Columbia	
1 February	Survivor Blues	Walter Trout	Provogue	
8 February	Survivor Blues	Walter Trout	Provogue	
15 February	Kind of Blue	Miles Davis	Columbia	
22 February	Fyah	Theon Cross	Gearbox	
1 March	Nobody Told Me	John Mayall	Forty Below	
8 March	Sweet Release	Reese Wynans & Friends	Provogue	
15 March	Kind of Blue	Miles Davis	Columbia	
22 March	Reckless Heart	Joanne Shaw Taylor	Silvertone	
29 March	Reckless Heart	Joanne Shaw Taylor	Silvertone	
5 April	How High	CC Smugglers	Cabin	
12 April	Reckless Heart	Joanne Shaw Taylor	Silvertone	
19 April	The Big Bad Blues	Billy Gibbons	Snakefarm	
26 April	Evans in England	Bill Evans	Resonance	
3 May	You Can't Steal My Joy	Ezra Collective	Enter the Jungle	
10 May	You Can't Steal My Joy	Ezra Collective	Enter the Jungle	
17 May	You Can't Steal My Joy	Ezra Collective	Enter the Jungle	
24 May	Baby, Please Come Home	Jimmie Vaughan	TLMC	
31 May	40	Stray Cats	Mascot	
7 June	Blues	Rory Gallagher	UMC	
14 June	Blues	Rory Gallagher	UMC	
21 June	Blues	Rory Gallagher	UMC	
28 June	Blues	Rory Gallagher	UMC	
5 July	Blues	Rory Gallagher	UMC	
12 July	Blues	Rory Gallagher	UMC	
19 July	Blues	Rory Gallagher	UMC	
26 July	Blues	Rory Gallagher	UMC	
2 August	Grits, Beans and Greens: The Lost Fontana Studio Session 1969	Tubby Hayes Quartet	Fontana	
9 August	Blume	Nérija	Domino	
16 August	Grits, Beans and Greens: The Lost Fontana Studio Session 1969	Tubby Hayes Quartet	Fontana	
23 August	Down to the River	The Allman Betts Band	BMG	
30 August	Blues	Rory Gallagher	UMC	
6 September	Blues	Rory Gallagher	UMC	
13 September	Valve Bone Woe	Chrissie Hynde	BMG	
20 September	Light It Up	Kris Barras Band	Provogue	
27 September	Kill or Be Kind	Samantha Fish	Rounder	
4 October	War in My Mind	Beth Hart	Provogue	
11 October	War in My Mind	Beth Hart	Provogue	
18 October	War in My Mind	Beth Hart	Provogue	
25 October	High Water II	The Magpie Salute	Provogue	
1 November	True Love: A Celebration of Cole Porter	Harry Connick Jr.	Verve	
8 November	I Shouldn't Be Telling You This	Jeff Goldblum, The Mildred Snitzer Orchestra	Decca	
15 November	True Love: A Celebration of Cole Porter	Harry Connick Jr.	Verve	
22 November	Here's to Christmas	Chris Kamara	So What?	
29 November	Here's to Christmas	Chris Kamara	So What?	
6 December	Here's to Christmas	Chris Kamara	So What?	
13 December	Here's to Christmas	Chris Kamara	So What?	
20 December	Here's to Christmas	Chris Kamara	So What?	
27 December	Here's to Christmas	Chris Kamara	So What?	

== See also ==
- 2019 in British music
