= Shy (album) =

2015 album by Stacey Solomon

Studio album by Stacey Solomon
- Released: 19 April 2015
- Recorded: 2014–2015
- Genre: Pop
- Length: 38:42
- Label: Conehead Records

Shy is the debut studio album by English singer Stacey Solomon. It was released by Conehead Records on 19 April 2015, and debuted at number 45 on the UK Albums Chart.

== Track listing ==
No.	Title	Length
1.	"Shy"	3:26
2.	"Breath Away"	3:55
3.	"Gravity"	4:43
4.	"Are You Just Sleeping"	3:45
5.	"The Way We Was"	3:08
6.	"I Hope You're Happy"	3:33
7.	"Perfect You"	3:16
8.	"Dream in Blue"	3:42
9.	"My Big Mistake"	3:02
10.	"Too Late to Love Me Now"	3:16
11.	"I Walk the Line"	2:56

== Charts ==
Chart	Position
UK Albums Chart	45
