= Graham Stokes (music executive) =

British music executive and musician

Graham Barry Stokes (born 9 February 1958, Birmingham, West Midlands, England) is a British music executive and musician.

== Career ==
=== Early career ===
Stokes worked for the Radio and Television Promotions Department at Arista Records, with bands such as The Beat and Secret Affair. He then spent the next 10 years working at some of London's biggest record labels including London Records, Island Records and MCA Records where he helped to guide the careers of Bananarama, Bobby Brown, Communards, Fine Young Cannibals, Kim Wilde and Run DMC.

=== Recording career ===
In 1989 he embarked on a recording career under the name Graham Stokes, then under the pseudonym Graystoke and finally as lead guitarist with the band Broken Wings. Broken Wings released their eponymous debut album in 1996. Stokes also wrote songs for other artists during this time including a Top 40 hit for the Irish boyband, Reel, and their debut single, "Lift Me Up".

=== 2000 to 2009 ===
In 2000, Stokes set up his first record label called GSM Records. He signed the five-piece girl band Girls@Play who went on to release two hit singles. The tracks were produced by Mike Stock of Stock Aitken Waterman fame, with whom Stokes had worked in the 1980s with Bananarama. The first single "Airhead" released in February 2001 reached No. 18 in the UK Singles Chart, whilst their second single, "Respectable", released in October 2001 reached No. 29. When the label was sold on to the original investors, Stokes once again teamed up with Mike Stock to run his new label Better the Devil Records. They signed Fast Food Rockers a British pop trio whose debut single, "The Fast Food Song", reached No. 2 in the UK Singles Chart in June 2003. They went on to have two further Top 30 records.

In 2004, Stokes went on to launch his own record label Shell Records releasing four BWO studio albums, and working with The Alex Cuba Band and Sandra McCracken.

=== Conehead UK ===
In 2009, Stokes launched new independent record label Conehead UK. In July 2009, Peter Andre signed to the label, and his album, Revelation released by Conehead reached No. 3 in the UK Albums Chart. Andre's second album with the label, Accelerate was released in October 2010, and went on to reach No. 10 in the UK Albums Chart in its first week. In 2009, Stokes struck a deal for Conehead with Swedish company Bonnier, who had acquired the rights to new albums from BWO. He then went on to sign to Conehead Another Level's Dane Bowers, Ella Chi, London singer/songwriters The Rise, Anthony Goldsbrough and Michael Gazzard, Canadian band In-Flight Safety and Finnish musician and keyboardist with Sunrise Avenue; Osmo.

In 2011, Conehead announced four new major signings. Former X Factor finalist Rhydian signed to Conehead in early 2011 and released the album Waves on 1 August 2011. Engelbert Humperdinck signed with Conehead in June and released a new studio album in 2012. In July, Julian Lennon became the tenth artist on Conehead's roster and released his album Everything Changes on 3 October 2011. X Factor finalist and I'm a Celebrity...Get Me Out of Here! winner Stacey Solomon also joined the roster, and her first album with Conehead was released in 2015.

=== 2015–present ===
In 2015, Graham Stokes shifted his professional focus toward artist management and album-release oversight. His first full artist management relationship during this period was with Indian singer-songwriter Nikhil D'Souza. D’Souza’s single Beautiful Mind was released on East West (a Warner Music division) in 2017.

In 2017, Stokes began working with Gilbert O'Sullivan, arranging a slot for O'Sullivan at BBC Proms in the Park (Hyde Park) to perform with the BBC Concert Orchestra. Stokes also managed the release of O’Sullivan’s self-titled album. The record entered the UK Albums Chart in 2018 and reached the top 20.

In 2018, Stokes booked Caroline Redman Lusher’s Rock Choir to perform at BBC Proms in the Park in Hyde Park alongside the BBC Concert Orchestra. In the following year, Stokes managed the release of Des'ree’s album A Love Story, her first studio album in 16 years.

During this period Stokes also curated and negotiated two compilation projects: Magic Bus (Huge Hits from the Hippie Trail) (Universal Music TV, 2015) and Elaine Paige Presents: The Musicals (2016).

In 2019, Stokes managed the recording and release of BBC Children in Need: Got It Covered, which featured various UK actors covering meaningful songs to raise funds for disadvantaged children. The album included covers by Helena Bonham Carter, Olivia Colman, David Tennant, and Jodie Whittaker, among others, with a behind-the-scenes documentary also produced. Each track was crafted and recorded at the Abbey Road Studios and RAK Studios in London. The actors received guidance and mentoring from award-winning record producers and songwriters Guy Chambers and Jonathan Quarmby, while the vocal coach Mark De-Lisser helped the artists record their tracks and Steve Sidwell conducted the BBC Concert Orchestra. The making of the album, released on Silva Screen Records, was recorded as part of the 90-minute entertainment documentary BBC Children in Need: Got It Covered, which was co-produced by BBC Studios and 20four7films and aired ahead of BBC Children in Need’s 2019 Appeal.

Whilst the Got It Covered album was being made, Silva Screen Records also asked Graham to manage the recording and release of footballer Chris Kamara's debut swing album of Christmas classics. Both Got It Covered and Here’s to Christmas entered the UK Albums Chart in the top 10 that year. Stokes collaborated again with Guy Chambers in 2022 when Chambers worked on material with Austrian singer-songwriter Trickster.

In 2017 Graham began managing the DJ Gary Davies, whom he had known since his radio promotion days in the 1980s when Davies was one of BBC Radio 1’s star broadcasters. They remained good friends, and when Davies was asked to stand in for Sara Cox to present a special 2-hour edition of Sounds of the 80s on BBC Radio 2, it marked his first time back on BBC Radio after 23 years away. In October 2017, January and October 2018, and October/November 2020, Davies sat in for Steve Wright's BBC Radio 2 show. On 18 May 2018, as part of a re-organisation of the Radio 2 DJ roster following changes to the station's evening line-up, Davies took over from Sara Cox as the host of Radio 2's Sounds of the 80s. He also provides holiday cover for fellow Radio 2 presenters including Zoe Ball, Sara Cox, OJ Borg, Dermot O'Leary, Vernon Kay, and Rylan Clark. Davies also tours the live version of Sounds of the 80s as well as performing regular DJ slots across the UK.
