= Ashleigh and Pudsey =

British dog trick act

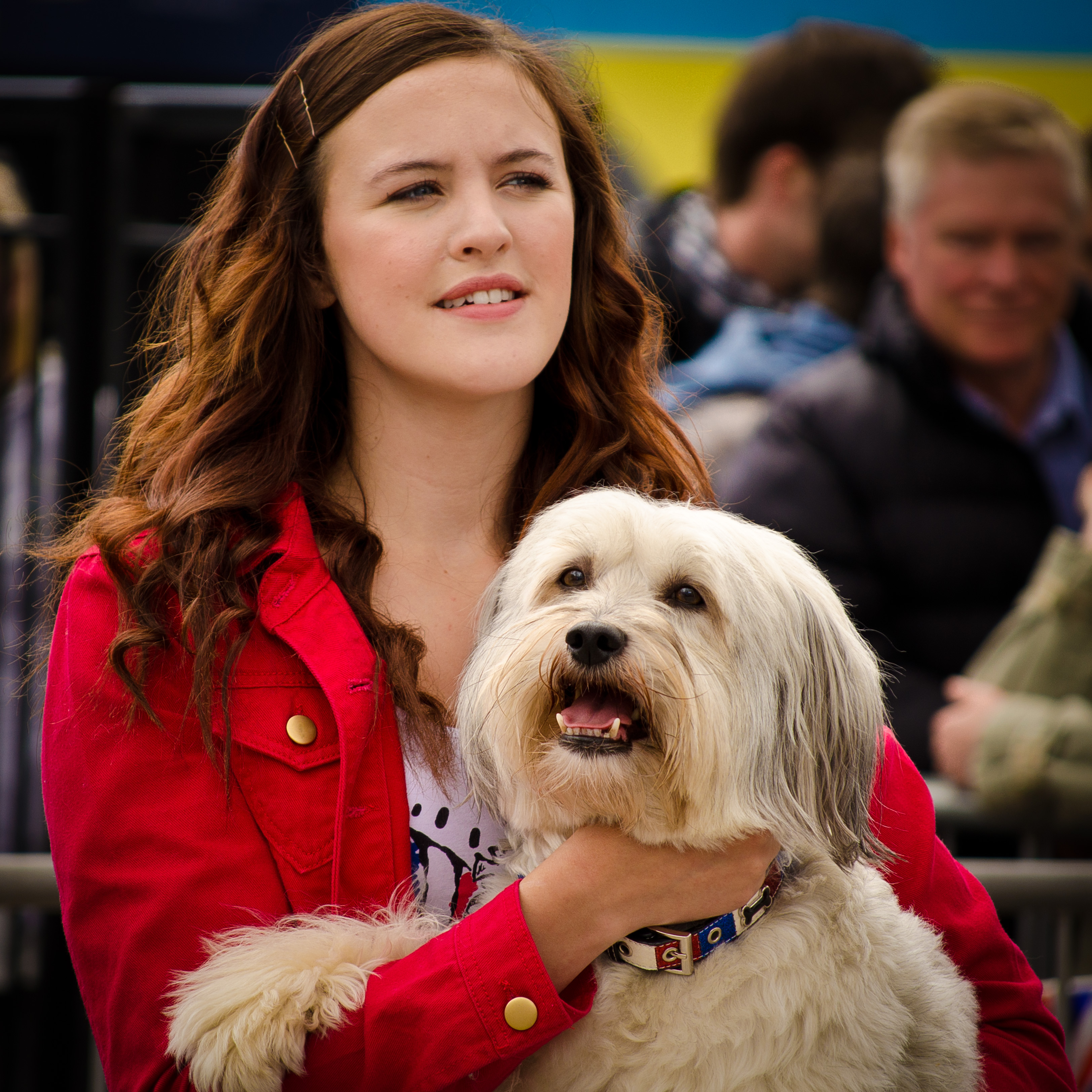
Ashleigh and Pudsey at the Queen's Jubilee celebrations in 2012

Ashleigh and Pudsey was a musical canine freestyle act, comprising trainer Ashleigh Jade Butler (born 7 February 1995) and Pudsey (28 December 2005 – 20 July 2017), a male Border Collie, Bichon Frise, and Chinese Crested powderpuff cross. They achieved prominence as contestants in the sixth series of the television talent show Britain's Got Talent, which they won on 12 May 2012, becoming the first dog trick act to win the competition.

On 21 July 2017, Butler announced that Pudsey had died. Following his death, Butler said that her other trained dog, Sully, would take over future events but would "never become Pudsey”.

== Career ==
=== Britain's Got Talent ===
Ashleigh and Pudsey were part of the sixth series of Britain's Got Talent. Their audition was held in Cardiff and aired on 7 April 2012. They danced to "Meet the Flintstones" by The B-52's. Although in 2012, four judges were introduced on the panel, on the day of recording Amanda Holden was not able to attend, therefore they performed to the remaining three. With a standing ovation from the audience and all three judges, they were put through to the next round. Simon Cowell said "Pudsey is one of the best dancing dogs I've ever seen".

They participated in the first semi-final on 6 May 2012, performing to "Peppy and George" from The Artist. They were later voted through to the final by the public.

The final was held on 12 May 2012, where they performed to "Theme from Mission: Impossible". The routine involved Pudsey walking across the judging panel and then climbing onto Ashleigh's back. Later that evening, Ashleigh and Pudsey won the 2012 series of Britain's Got Talent, beating classical duo Jonathan and Charlotte.

=== Post Britain's Got Talent ===
On 2 June 2012, Ashleigh and Pudsey performed at Epsom Downs Racecourse in the presence of Queen Elizabeth II as part of the Diamond Jubilee celebrations.

In September 2012, Ashleigh and Pudsey were guest judges on ITV2's Top Dog Model.

As part of the prize for winning Britain's Got Talent, Ashleigh and Pudsey performed at the 84th Royal Variety Performance on 19 November 2012 in the presence of Queen Elizabeth II, which aired on ITV on 3 December.

In December 2012, Pudsey played the role of Duchess in David Walliams's TV film adaptation of his children's book Mr Stink.

On Boxing Day 2012, Ashleigh and Pudsey were judges on ITV talent show That Dog Can Dance! hosted by Christine Bleakley.

In early 2013, Ashleigh and Pudsey were co-presenters on the CBBC programme Who Let the Dogs Out and About? which toured the UK throughout the summer of 2012. Since Autumn of 2013, Ashleigh and Pudsey have become presenters of the main show, Who Let the Dogs Out?. In April 2015, Ashleigh and Pudsey were guest presenters at the 10th Young Scot Awards.

In July 2016, Ashleigh participated in Episode 2/4 of Celebrity First Dates on Channel 4 and decided against a second date.

In March 2020, Ashleigh and Sully appeared on Crackerjack!.

=== Pudsey the Dog: The Movie ===
In January 2013, it was announced that Simon Cowell would produce Pudsey: The Movie. The film, which was released in the UK on 18 July 2014, follows Pudsey and three siblings Molly, George and Tommy as they move to the village of Chuffington-on-Sea with their mother Gail (Jessica Hynes) and set out to save the village from their landlord Mr Thorne (John Sessions) and his cat Faustus. Pudsey is voiced by comedian David Walliams.

=== Theatre ===
From December 2012 to January 2013, Ashleigh and Pudsey performed at the New Victoria Theatre, Woking in Dick Whittington opposite Stephen Mulhern. The deal is believed to have been worth around £150,000.

From December 2013 to January 2014, Ashleigh and Pudsey performed in Dick Whittington opposite Jodie Prenger at the Opera House, Manchester.

From December 2014 to January 2015, Ashleigh and Pudsey starred in Dick Whittington at the Bristol Hippodrome.

They played the roles of Dorothy and Toto in the Easter pantomime of The Wizard of Oz at the Playhouse, Whitley Bay on 9 and 10 April 2015.

== Filmography ==
=== Television ===
Year	Title	Role	Reference(s)
2012	Britain's Got Talent	Contestants	
2012	Top Dog Model	Guest judges	
2012	Mr Stink	Duchess (Pudsey only)	
2012	That Dog Can Dance!	Judges	
2013	Who Let the Dogs Out and About?	Presenters and performers	
2013–2014	Who Let the Dogs Out?	Presenters	
2014–2015	The Dog Ate My Homework	Panelist (Ashleigh only)	6 episodes
2019	America's Got Talent: The Champions	Contestants (Ashleigh and Sully)	
2019	Britain's Got Talent: The Champions	Contestants (Ashleigh and Sully)	

==== Guest appearances ====
- Daybreak (12 April 2012, 14 May 2012, 13 August 2012, 18 December 2012, 30 July 2013, 18 February 2014) – Guests
- Lorraine (14 May 2012, 12 April 2013, 4 December 2014) – Guests
- This Morning (10 April 2012, 14 May 2012, 10 October 2012, 8 July 2014, 13 April 2015) – Guests
- Alan Carr: Chatty Man (18 May 2012) – Guests
- Good Morning America (4 June 2012) – Guests
- T4 on the Beach (1 July 2012) – Guests
- The Tonight Show with Jay Leno (11 July 2012) – Performers
- America's Got Talent (18 July 2012) – Performers
- Red or Black? (1 September 2012) – Performers
- The Alan Titchmarsh Show (3 September 2012, 13 November 2013, 3 March 2014) – Guests
- Loose Women (24 October 2012) – Guests
- Children in Need (16 November 2012) – Performer (Pudsey Only)
- Royal Variety Performance (3 December 2012) – Performers (part of the BGT prize)
- Pet School (3–5 December 2012) – Guests
- Super Famous Animals (30 December 2012) – Contributors
- National Television Awards (23 January 2013) – Award presenters and performers
- Celebrity Juice (7 March 2013) – Guest panellists
- The British Animal Honours (18 April 2013) – Award presenters
- The British Soap Awards (19 May 2013) – Award presenters
- Britain's Got Talent (1 June 2013) – Guest performers
- Sam & Mark's Big Friday Wind-Up (16 August 2013) – Guests
- Britain's Got More Talent (26 May 2014) – Guests
- Good Morning Britain (7 July 2014) – Guests
- Weekend (12 July 2014) – Guests
- Celebrity Squares (17 September 2014) – Guest
- The Gadget Show (13 October 2014) – Guests
- Phillip's 24 Hour Marathon for Text Santa (1 December 2014) – Guests
- Pointless Celebrities (21 December 2014) – Contestants
- Reality Bites (12 February 2015) – Guest, Ashleigh only
- Crufts 2015 (8 March 2015) – Contestants in Dog agility
- Ant & Dec's Saturday Night Takeaway (27 February 2016) – 'Who Shot Simon Cowell?' sketch
- The Saturday Show (5 March 2016) – Guests
- Celebrity First Dates (15 July 2016) – Participant, Ashleigh only
- Ultimate Brain (2016)

=== Film ===
Year	Title	Role	Release date
2014	Pudsey: The Movie	Pudsey	18 July 2014

== Theatre ==
Year	Title	Role	Location
2012–13	Dick Whittington	Alice Fitzwarren and her dog	New Victoria Theatre, Woking
2013–14	Dick Whittington	Alice Fitzwarren and her dog	Opera House, Manchester
2014–15	Dick Whittington	Alice Fitzwarren and her dog	Bristol Hippodrome
2015	Wizard of Oz	Dorothy and Toto	Playhouse, Whitley Bay
2015–16	Cinderella		Darlington Civic Theatre
2016	Jack and the Beanstalk	Princess Apricot	Royal & Derngate Northampton
2017	Jack and the Beanstalk	Princess Apricot	Wycombe Swan Theatre
2018	Alice in Wonderland	Alice	Rhyl Pavilion Theatre
2020–21	Once Upon a Panto	Princess Aurora and Sully	Rhyl Pavilion Theatre

== Writing ==
On 11 October 2012, Pudsey's "official" autobiography, Pudsey: My Autobidography (ISBN 978-0751550870), was published by the Sphere imprint of Little, Brown and Company. The book formed part of a £100,000 publishing deal with Ashleigh Butler.

== Charity work and campaigns ==
In 2012, Ashleigh and Pudsey fronted a PETA campaign calling for a ban on cruelty to animals in circuses. In December 2012, Ashleigh and Pudsey launched a Christmas appeal alongside Vets4Pets to highlight the risks that pets face over the Christmas period.

== Pudsey's death and aftermath ==
On 20 July 2017, Pudsey was euthanised as he had terminal leukaemia. Ashleigh announced Pudsey's death via her Instagram. The next day, Butlers's management announced that her trained dog, Sully, a Border Collie, Chinese Crested Powderpuff, and Poodle cross, would replace Pudsey in booked pantomime appearances and other future arrangements.

In 2018 and 2019, Sully (full name Ag Ch. The Closet Monster of Ashpen), along with Butler, won the small breed agility competition at Crufts.

== See also ==
- Kate and Gin
- Jules O'Dwyer & Matisse

Preceded by Jai McDowall	Winner of Britain's Got Talent; 2012	Succeeded by Attraction
