= Gatis Kandis =

Latvian comedian

- Born: 29 July 1981 (age 45); Dundaga, Latvia
- Education: University of Latvia

Comedy career
- Years active: 2011–present
- Medium: Gigs, television
- Genres: Comedy music, comedy

YouTube information
- Channel: Gatis Kandis
- Years active: 2009–present
- Subscribers: 339,000
- Views: 35.7M
- Website: Gatis Kandis

Gatis Kandis (born 29 July 1981) is a Latvian comedian, actor and YouTuber, best known outside Latvia for progressing to the semi-finals on the sixth series of Britain's Got Talent in 2012. Kandis has since appeared in other television programmes such as Big Brother as a guest comedian. He played Hansl in Alice Frick's What The Frick? and has a YouTube channel where he uploads comedy videos. Kandis has performed his stand-up routine at events such as Never Mind the Backstop at Camden Comedy Club in 2019 and at Leicester Square's "Not-So-New Comedian of the Year" Award show, where he won first prize.

Performing a style of humour that is intentionally bad, Kandis has been described by multiple critics and Britain's Got Talent creator Simon Cowell as the "funniest unfunniest" comedian.

== Career and style ==
=== Britain's Got Talent ===
Gatis Kandis first auditioned in the fifth series of Britain's Got Talent in 2011, but did not advance to the next stage of the competition. Kandis auditioned the following year in 2012, for the show's sixth series, performing intentionally terrible comedy. Judge David Walliams described his act as "so bad, it's actually brilliant" and show creator Simon Cowell called him the "funniest unfunniest comedian I have ever heard in my life", referring to his jokes as "absolute rubbish" despite making him laugh. Kandis advanced to the semi-finals of the competition, performing a similar style of comedy and closing his act with "have some fantastic dreams tonight". He did not advance further. Kandis reappeared four years later in 2016 on Britain's Got More Talent, performing a similar style comedy act in the auditions stage of the competition.

=== Career and comedy style ===
Kandis was featured on the thirteenth series of the UK version of Big Brother, performing a stand-up routine at the Megalols Cafe for the "No Laughing Matter" challenge. Housemates were tasked with not laughing during his routine. The following year, Kandis recorded a 90-second audition video for the fourteenth edition of the show. He ultimately wasn't selected. Kandis toured alongside eighty other comedians in the Eastern European Comedy Festival in 2018. Kandis performed at the Camden Comedy Club in 2019 as part of the Never Mind the Backstop event, a show setup by multiple comics to celebrate the UK withdrawal from the European Union. Kandis performed a comedic song about his chicken's birthday. Also in 2019, Kandis performed for the Leicester Square "Not-So-New Comedian of the Year" Award show, previously titled the "Old Comedian of the Year" Award. Kandis won the first prize award, which came with a "package prize" of £1,000. Kandis played the role of Hansl on Alice Frick's sitcom What The Frick? for a total of five episodes in 2020.

Kandis' style of comedy is intentionally terrible. On his YouTube channel Kandis uploads videos centered on his unique style of humour, including comically instructing how to open a gate, reciting sixty-nine (a reference to the sex position of the same name) female first names in thirty seconds, and demonstrating how to generate electricity using a fleece. Then comedically transferring static electricity to his metal bed frame to take a measurement of how much electricity he was able to generate in the process, with the ultimate goal being to successfully boil a kettle or power a light bulb. Kandis' comedy has been described as "crap", "terrible", and "so bad, it's actually brilliant". Kandis has described himself as "playing a character" when performing comedy, aiming only for laughter from those who watch his stand-up routines. After performing at the Bloomsbury Theatre as part of the 2015 Musical Comedy Awards Final, Kandis' material was described by Bruce Dessau of Beyond The Joke as "dark and less clownish as he played up his creepiness", comparing his accent to Norwegian comedian Daniel Simonsen.

== Personal life ==
Kandis grew up in the Latvian village of Dundaga. Having not enjoyed studying physics in the Latvian capital of Riga, Kandis transferred to the Student Theatre at the University of Latvia to study acting, subsequently travelling to Los Angeles to work in an amusement park. Kandis later moved to the West Hendon area of London having a preference for the warmer weather of the UK in comparison to Latvia, taking up a job as a carer, supporting individuals with autism. His brother is a musician in Ireland, his father is a welder and his mother, a baker, disapproves of his humour.

== Filmography and awards ==
=== Television and film ===
Year	Title	Role	Ref.
2011	Britain's Got Talent series 5	Himself, auditions	
2012	Britain's Got Talent series 6	Himself, semi-finals	
2012	Big Brother	Himself	
2013	Mobsters	Various characters, 3 episodes	
2016	Various	1 episode	
2016	Britain's Got More Talent	Himself	
2019	Ivor the Dance King	Himself	
2020	What The Frick?	Hansl, 5 episodes	
2021	Winnipeggers	Himself	
2025	Lukas DiSparrow	Himself	

=== Awards and nominations ===
Year	Award	Result	Ref.
2014	Leicester Square New Comedian of the Year	Nominated	
2015	Musical Comedy Awards 2015	Nominated	
2019	Leicester Square Not-So-New Comedian of the Year	Won	
