= SuperFetch =

- Genre: Dogs
- Starring: Zak George
- Country of origin: United States
- No. of seasons: 1
- No. of episodes: 20

Production
- Running time: 30 minutes

Original release
- Network: Animal Planet
- Release: October 3 – December 12, 2009

SuperFetch is a show on Animal Planet that stars Zak George. He instructs and advises on how to train dogs to perform tricks.

== Episodes ==
No.	Title	Original release date	Prod. code
1	"Save My Manicure; Put Toilet Seat Down"	October 3, 2009	SF1
Owners learn how to train their pets to do tricks. In the series opener, a woman teaches her Bernese mountain dog to put down the toilet seat; and a cocker spaniel learns how to preserve its master's manicure by paying for it and retrieving the car keys.
2	"See Spot Bowl; Bartending Dog"	October 3, 2009	SF2
A dog learns to bowl; a college student trains his dog to pour beer.
3	"Turn Off the Alarm Clock; Hair Dresser's Doggie Assistant"	October 10, 2009	SF3
A wife combats her husband's snooze habit by teaching her dog to steal the alarm clock; a bulldog learns to retrieve aprons and magazines for a hairstylist.
4	"Fetch Me Some Phone Numbers; Take Out the Garbage"	October 10, 2009	SF4
A wannabe ladies' man teaches his dog to bring him women's phone numbers; a dog is taught to take out the trash.
5	"Fetch Me a Diaper; Fetch Me a Pizza"	October 17, 2009	SF5
A dog learns to retrieve diapers, while another pooch is taught how to pay the pizza deliveryman and fetch the food.
6	"Make the Bed; Dog's on My Back"	October 17, 2009	SF6
An Australian shepherd learns to make a bed; a Border collie is taught a show-stopping trick.
7	"Dancing Dog; Dog Rides Tandem Bike"	October 24, 2009	SF7
A dog is taught a tricky dance, while another pooch learns to ride a bike.
8	"See Spot Make Breakfast; Dog Feeds Horses"	October 24, 2009	SF8
A woman teaches her dog to make breakfast for her husband; a pooch learns how to feed horses.
9	"Doggie Best Man; Fetch Me a Tamale"	October 31, 2009	SF9
A dog learns to usher wedding guests; a man teaches his dog to fetch him a snack at the beach.
10	"Fetch Me a Lady; Fetch Me a Bride"	October 31, 2009	SF10
A dog helps its owner flirt at the beach by carrying beer to women and stealing their towels; a pooch plays a part in a marriage proposal by delivering the engagement ring.
11	"Find the Remote; Find Me a Girlfriend"	November 7, 2009	SF11
A puggle is trained to retrieve lost remote controls; a dog becomes a flirtation tool for its owner by learning an impressive trick.
12	"Doggie Personal Trainer; Dog Is the DJ"	November 7, 2009	SF12
A dog aids its owner's mother in her weight-loss quest; a Boston terrier learns to DJ.
13	"Fetch Me a Beer; Dog Is My Tennis Partner"	November 21, 2009	SF13
A dog learns to fetch beer for his owner; a tennis player trains his pooch to retrieve balls.
14	"Fetch the Dry Cleaning; Dog Is the First Mate"	November 21, 2009	SF14
A dog is taught to retrieve dry cleaning; another pooch learns how to help out on a boat.
15	"Dog Clears the Table; Doggie Handy Man"	November 28, 2009	SF15
A boxer learns how to clear plates off the table; a terrier is taught to fetch tools for a handyman.
16	"Fetch Me Some Ice Cream; Dog Cleans Up Bachelor Pad"	November 28, 2009	SF16
A yellow Lab brings back treats from the ice-cream truck; a dog keeps a tidy home for its bachelor owner.
17	"Dog Is the Soccer Coach; Doggie Party Host"	December 5, 2009	SF17
A dog learns to coach soccer; a dog is trained to be the perfect hostess.
18	"Clean Up the Dog Park; Fetch Me a Date Night"	December 5, 2009	SF18
A dog learns to make deliveries; a Jack Russell is taught to mix drinks and turn on lights and music.
19	"Fetch Me a Hole in One; Dog Herds Children"	December 12, 2009	SF19
A border collie corrals kids for school each morning; a golfer trains his dog to retrieve his balls from water hazards.
20	"Fetch Me a Boyfriend; Dog Pitches Tent"	December 12, 2009	SF20
A dog flirts for its master at the Laundromat by stealing clothes; a dog collects firewood and pitches a tent.
