= Zak George =

American broadcaster and dog trainer (born 1978)

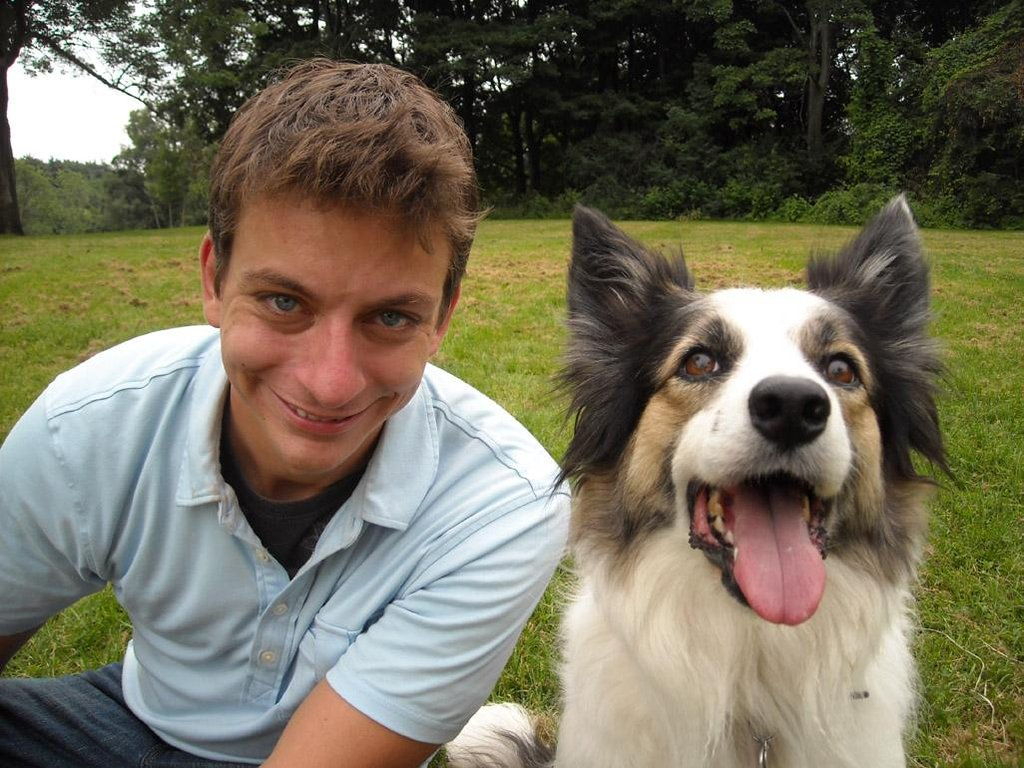
- Zak George & his dog Venus at the park, July 2009
- Born: December 3, 1978 (age 46); Atlanta, Georgia, U.S.
- Occupation: Dog Trainer
- Years active: 2006–present
- Spouse: Bree George (married 2018-present)

Zak George (born December 3, 1978, in Atlanta, Georgia) is an American dog trainer, writer, and broadcast personality known for his Youtube channel, hosting shows such as SuperFetch in 2009, Who Let the Dogs Out? in 2011, and hosting various shows on the Animal Planet. He is the author of the book Zak George's Dog Training Revolution, published in 2016; he has been a guest writer on many articles and blogs on dog training and obedience over his 16 year career. He is known for using positive reinforcement training methods, and his upbeat and energetic personality on camera.

== Principles ==
Zak George is a proponent of positive reinforcement dog training, which teaches that only gentle, reward-based methods, without physical aversion, should be used for dog training. He believes teaching is about communication, not domination. He feels we need to treat our dogs with respect and promote a strong, loving bond with them through positive reinforcement, not punishments. He has stated his training philosophy as "I began teaching people how to teach their dogs out of a genuine desire to bring the world of dog training into the 21st century and to show people that through relationship-based training anything is possible."

His methods have been compared to those used Dr. Ian Dunbar and the SPCA, which also focus on positive reinforcement in their training programs.

== Career ==
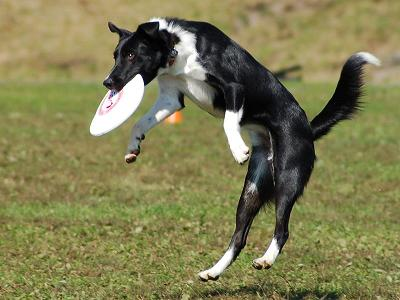
Dog competing in frisbee competition

Zak started training dogs in 2005 when he got his dog Venus; the two started competing in frisbee competitions and he found his passion in dog training. He quit his job in real estate the same year and applied to be a trainer at PetSmart, despite not having any traditional training.

He made his debut on Youtube in 2006 where he uploaded videos with dog training advice and tutorials. He rose to prominence on the platform and has grown his following to over 3.5 million followers. In 2008 he pitched a show to Animal Planet, originally titled Fetch Me a Beer. The show was picked up and he made the transition to television when he began presenting SuperFetch in 2009 on Animal Planet. In 2011 and 2012 he presented and produced BBC children's show Who Let the Dogs Out?. Zak has also presented various programs for the Animal Planet channel such as Dogs 101.

His dog training expertise has landed him on many national talk shows and news programs such as Late Night with David Letterman, Late Night with Jimmy Fallon, The Early Show on CBS, Fox and Friends, and Rachael Ray.

In 2016 Zak's first book Zak George's Dog Training Revolution was published by Penguin Random House.

== Personal life ==
Zak is originally from Atlanta, Georgia. As of 2016 he lived in New Orleans with his wife, Bree George, their dogs, and their cat. Zak and Bree met while they were working as volunteers during the 2010 oil spill in the Gulf of Mexico and kept in contact when he went back to Atlanta. The pair married on December 8, 2018.
