= Stacey Solomon =

English singer and television personality (born 1989)

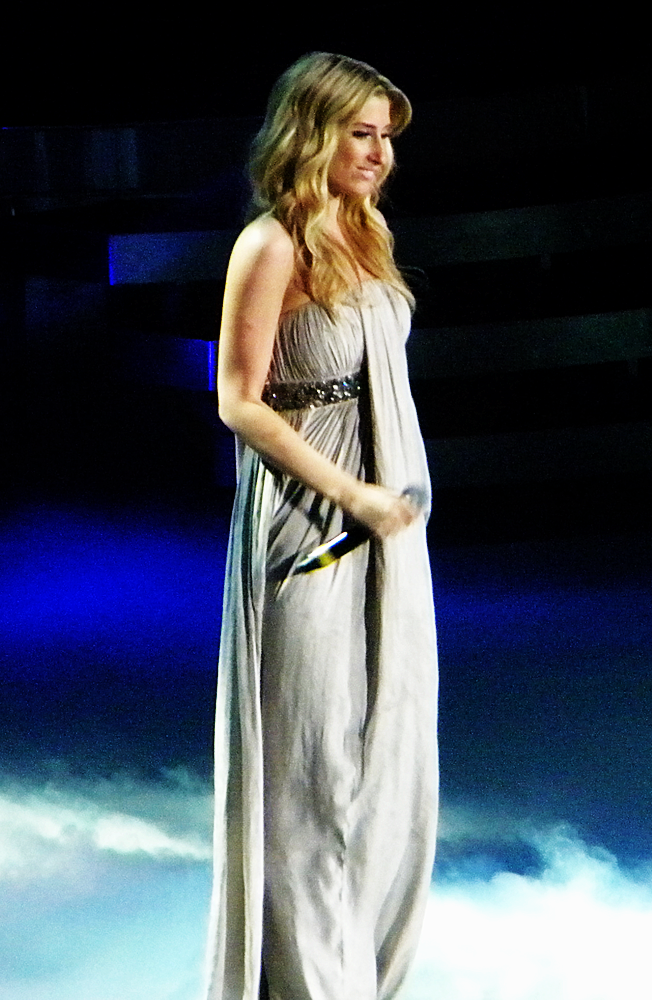
- Solomon performing on the 2010 X Factor tour.
- Born: Stacey Chanelle Clare Solomon; 4 October 1989 (age 36); Dagenham, London, England
- Occupations: Television personality; singer
- Years active: 2009–present
- Spouse: Joe Swash (m. 2022)
- Children: 5
- Musical career
- Genre: Pop
- Instruments: Vocals
- Label: Conehead UK

Stacey Chanelle Clare Solomon (born 4 October 1989) is an English television personality and singer. She rose to prominence in 2009 as a contestant on the sixth series of the ITV talent show The X Factor, where she finished in third place. The following year, she won the tenth series of the ITV reality show I'm a Celebrity... Get Me Out of Here!.

Solomon's debut single, a cover of "Driving Home for Christmas", was released in 2011, and her debut studio album, Shy, was released in 2015. In 2016, she co-presented I'm a Celebrity: Extra Camp, an ITV2 spin-off from the main show. From 2016 to 2024, she was a panelist on the ITV talk show Loose Women. In 2019, Solomon was a regular panellist on the ITV2 comedy show Celebrity Juice.

Since 2021, Solomon presents the BBC One reality series Sort Your Life Out, for which she won a National Television Award, as well as being nominated for two British Academy Television Awards.

== Early life ==
Stacey Chanelle Clare Solomon was born on 4 October 1989 to Fiona Nash, a nurse, and David Neal Solomon, a photographer. She has two siblings, Jemma, and Matthew. Her parents divorced, when she was young, but kept co-parenting, living close to one another. Solomon grew up in Dagenham, East London, and attended King Solomon High School. Solomon was raised with exposure to both Judaism and Christianity, and has spoken proudly of her heritage.

== Career ==
=== Music ===
==== X Factor ====
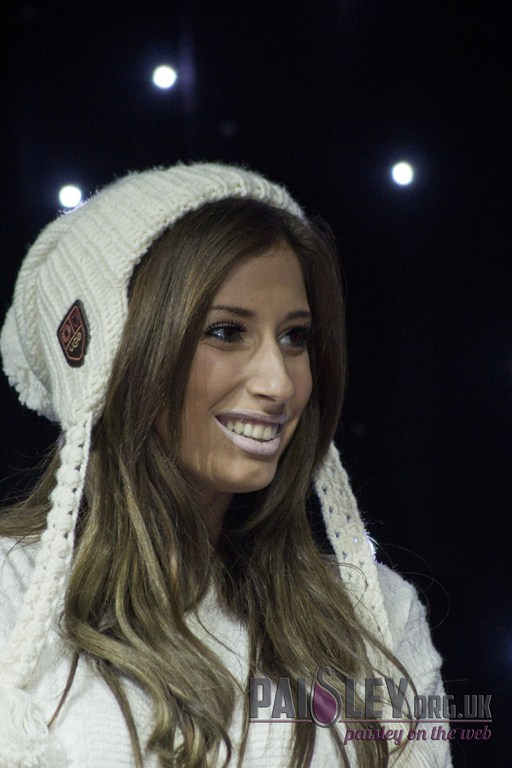
Solomon in 2011

In 2009, Solomon auditioned for the sixth series of The X Factor, performing "What a Wonderful World". She was among the top 12 contestants and advanced to the live shows and was mentored by Dannii Minogue. During the first week of the live shows she performed Coldplay's "The Scientist". During week two, she performed "At Last", receiving the most votes of the public. She sang "When You Wish Upon a Star" during the third week. On the fourth week, all contestants had to sing rock songs; Minogue selected "Somewhere Only We Know", and Solomon's performance resulted in positive reviews. On the fifth week, she sang "Son of a Preacher Man". The sixth week into the competition, Solomon sang Queen's "Who Wants to Live Forever". During the sixth week, she and her fellow X Factor finalists released a cover of Michael Jackson's "You Are Not Alone", which topped the charts on the UK Singles Chart and the Irish Singles Chart. On the seventh week, she performed "I Can't Make You Love Me". In the quarter-final, Solomon performed "Rule the World" by Take That and "Something About the Way You Look Tonight" by Elton John. In the semi-final, she performed another Michael Jackson song, "The Way You Make Me Feel", and the song "Somewhere". During the final week, she performed a duet "Feeling Good" with Michael Bublé. She also performed "What a Wonderful World" and "Who Wants to Live Forever". Solomon was the last contestant eliminated, behind winner Joe McElderry and runner-up Olly Murs. Solomon went on tour with her fellow X Factor finalists.

She returned to the show in December 2010, where she presented from Essex for winner, Matt Cardle and to the fourteenth series of The X Factor UK in December 2017, presenting alongside George Shelley, interviewing the finalists relatives and friends at the live finals from ExCeL London. She returned in the same position the following year, In 2015, the singer signed to Warren Askew & Oliver Moheda at Total Artist Management.

==== Albums ====
In June 2011, Solomon began working on her debut album. It was a work in progress for several years. Shy was finally released in April 2015. She stated that she had complete control in a bidding war between record labels.

In 2011, Solomon performed as the headline act at Paisley's Christmas Lights Switch On event and released a cover of Chris Rea's "Driving Home for Christmas" as her Christmas single. It was used for the Iceland Christmas commercial and reached number 27 in the UK Singles Chart. Solomon was also the headline artist of 2014 tour of the world's largest children's choir, Young Voices, performing tracks from her forthcoming debut album.

=== Television ===
==== Reality and game shows ====
In 2010, Solomon took part in the tenth series of the reality show I'm a Celebrity...Get Me Out of Here! She beat Shaun Ryder in the final and was crowned "Queen of the Jungle". She would later take over from Laura Whitmore and become co-host of newly named I'm a Celebrity...Get Me Out of Here! spin-off I'm a Celebrity...Get Me Out of Here! Extra Camp alongside Vicky Pattison, Joe Swash and Chris Ramsey.

After a guest appearance on ITV daytime show Loose Women in 2010, Solomon was quickly made a regular panellist alongside Lisa Riley after Vicky Pattison and Jamelia left the show.

In October 2010, she won the Living TV show Party Wars. In April 2011, Solomon and Keith Lemon presented Sing If You Can. In 2011, she turned down the offer to join The Only Way Is Essex. From 11 March 2012, Solomon and Chris Moyles presented Sky Living's dating show The Love Machine. In Spring 2012, Solomon starred in an episode of Mad Mad World on ITV with Eamonn Holmes and Stephen K. Amos. From 5 September 2012, Solomon was part of the judging panel for ITV2's Top Dog Model. From February 2015, Solomon took part in the second series of The Jump and was eliminated on 4 February. On a celebrity special of The Chase aired on 30 October 2016, Solomon won £60,000 in her individual chase, opposing Anne Hegerty (The Governess). On 25 June 2017, Solomon appeared as a guest on ITV2's Love Island: Aftersun, a chat-show companion to Love Island. She also took part in a celebrity edition of The Crystal Maze on Channel 4. In January 2018 she participated in And They're Off! in aid of Sport Relief.

In 2019, Solomon became a regular panellist for ITV2's Celebrity Juice, hosted by Keith Lemon.

Solomon started presenting the BBC One series Sort Your Life Out in 2021. In each episode, a family declutters their home within seven days, with the help of Solomon and her team - organiser Dilly, carpenter Rob and cleaning expert Iwan. In 2024, Sort Your Life Out won the National Television Awards Factual Entertainment prize. In 2026, Sort Your Life Out entered its sixth series.

In May 2022, Solomon was introduced as co-host for Bake Off: The Professionals, replacing comedian Tom Allen.

==== Other ====
Solomon performed a duet with Ryder in 2011 at the 16th National Television Awards – "Feeling Good" and "Step On" by Happy Mondays. In May 2014, Solomon recorded the theme tune for Channel 5's children's show Pip Ahoy!. She also has a recurring role in the show, voicing Fuchsia the Flamingo.

She launched a clothing range with Primark on 11 October 2018.

On 15 December 2022, Solomon presented the festive craft show Stacey Solomon's Crafty Christmas. The show returned for a second episode in December 2023.

=== Commercial activity ===
In 2011, she became the face of supermarket Iceland, taking over from Coleen Nolan.

== Personal life ==
Solomon had her first son in 2008 at age 17, with her then-boyfriend Dean Cox. Her second son, born in 2012, was fathered by her ex-fiancé Aaron Barnham.

Solomon began dating television personality Joe Swash in 2016 after they met during the tenth series of I'm a Celebrity... Get Me Out of Here! in 2010. They were engaged on 24 December 2020, and married at their home on 24 July 2022, Solomon wearing a customised wedding gown by Israeli bridal house Berta. They have three children together: a son, born in May 2019, a daughter, born in October 2021 and a daughter born in February 2023. She is also the stepmother of Swash's son from a previous relationship.

Solomon has been open about dealing with anxiety.

== Filmography ==
=== Television ===
Television roles
Year	Title	Role	Notes
2009	The X Factor	Contestant	Third place
2010	I'm a Celebrity, Get Me Out of Here!	Contestant	Winner
2010	Party Wars	Contestant	Winner
2011	Sing If You Can	Co-presenter	Alongside Keith Lemon
2011	Wall of Fame	Guest Panelist	1 episode
2011	The Itch of the Golden Knit	Herself (voice)	Short
2011	Sooty	Miss Solomon the Vicar	1 episode
2011	Odd One In	Contestant	Away Team; 1 episode
2011	A League of Their Own	Herself	1 episode
2011	Mastermind	Contestant	1 episode
2011	Blankety Blank	Contestant	1 episode
2011–2013, 2016–2019	Celebrity Juice	Panelist	21 episodes
2011–2014	Never Mind the Buzzcocks	Guest Panelist	3 episodes
2011, 2019–2020	8 Out of 10 Cats	Guest Panelist	3 episodes
2012	Who Wants to Be a Millionaire?	Contestant	1 episode
2012	Lemon La Vida Loca	Herself	1 episode
2012	The Love Machine	Co-presenter	Alongside Chris Moyles
2012	Top Dog Model	Judge	
2013, 2017, 2019	Through the Keyhole	Guest Panelist	3 episodes
2014	Keep It in the Family	Herself	Special guest; 1 episode
2014–2015	Pip Ahoy!	Fuchsia (voice)	2 episodes
2016	Celebrity Chase	Contestant	1 episode
2016	The Jump	Contestant	1 episode
2016	I'm a Celebrity: Extra Camp	Co-presenter	
2016	It's Not Me, It's You	Guest Panelist	1 episode
2016–2017	Ant & Dec's Saturday Night Takeaway	Herself	3 episodes
2016–2024	Loose Women	Panelist	
2017	Would I Lie to You?	Guest Panelist	2 episodes
2017	Michael McIntyre's Big Show	Herself	Guest: 1 episode
2017	Love Island: Aftersun	Herself	Guest: 1 episode
2017	The Crystal Maze	Contestant	1 episode
2018	Big Star's Little Star	Contestant	1 episode
2018	When Comedy Goes Horribly Wrong	Presenter	
2018	Celebrity Catchphrase	Contestant	1 episode
2018	The Great Celebrity Bake Off for Stand Up To Cancer	Contestant	1 episode
2018	The Keith and Paddy Picture Show	Frenchie	1 episode
2019–2022	Celebrity Gogglebox	Herself	11 episodes
2020	CelebAbility	Team Captain	
2020	Shopping With Keith Lemon	Herself	Special guest; 1 episode
2021–present	Sort Your Life Out	Presenter	
2022	Bake Off: The Professionals	Co-presenter	
2022	Stacey Solomon's Crafty Christmas	Presenter	
2024	Stacey Solomon's Renovation Rescue	Presenter	
2025–present	Stacey & Joe	Herself	Starring alongside Joe Swash
2026	Britain's Got Talent	Guest Judge	2 episodes

== Discography ==
=== Albums ===
Title	Details	Peak chart positions
Title	Details	UK
Shy	Released: 18 April 2015; Format: Digital download, CD; Label: Conehead Records	45

=== Singles ===
==== As lead artist ====
Year	Title	Peak chart positions		Album
Year	Title	UK	SCO	Album
2011	"Driving Home for Christmas"	27	41	—N/a
2015	"Shy"	—	—	Shy
2016	"My Big Mistake"	—	—	Shy
"—" denotes a single that did not chart or was not released.

==== As featured artist ====
Year	Title	Peak chart positions			Album
Year	Title	UK	IRE	SCO	Album
2009	"You Are Not Alone" (as part of The X Factor finalists)	1	1	1	—N/a

== See also ==
- List of I'm a Celebrity...Get Me Out of Here! (British TV series) contestants
- List of The X Factor (British TV series) finalists

Preceded by Gino D'Acampo	I'm a Celebrity... Get Me Out of Here! Winner; 2010	Succeeded by Dougie Poynter
