= The Love Machine (TV series) =

British dating game show (2012–2013)

- Genre: Dating game show
- Presented by: Chris Moyles; Stacey Solomon
- Country of origin: United Kingdom
- Original language: English
- No. of series: 2
- No. of episodes: 19 (inc. 1 special)

Production
- Running time: 60 minutes (inc. adverts)
- Production company: Princess Productions

Original release
- Network: Sky Living
- Release: 11 March 2012 – 1 March 2013

Related
- The Love Machine: Love Bites; Blind Date; Take Me Out

The Love Machine is a British dating game show hosted by Chris Moyles and Stacey Solomon. It aired on Sky Living in the UK from 11 March 2012 to 1 March 2013.

== Format ==
The show which starts out with 8 different people standing in 'pods' in the Love Machine. These will either be men or women depending on the person who is going to be picking a date.

The hosts will introduce the 'picker' who will then give out some brief information about themselves and talk about what they would like to find in the Love Machine.

After the introductions are completed, the Love Machine will spin selecting one random pod from the available 8, the person in the selected pod will be lit up so that their facial features and clothes are clearly visible. The picker then has to decide whether they like the look and dress sense of the selected person, this sometimes involves audience participation.

The picker has the choice to spin again or to find out more about the person who has been selected. If the picker decides to find out more about the person who has been selected the Love Machine will show three different choices relating to what the picker can find out about the person selected. The picker has the chance to pick two of these, when the picker selects one, the Love Machine will give out a piece of information about the person, or the person may perform a special skill etc. If the picker doesn't like the person they have found out more about, they get one last random spin, this can land on anyone in the Love Machine, the person who is selected is the person the picker has to take on holiday with them, without the chance to find out anything about them.

If the picker decides to spin the wheel again, the process is repeated until the picker decides finds out more about one of the people, or all eight of the people have been selected. If this happens, the picker has to find out more about this person, with the said three topics being displayed and two being chosen. If the picker decides they don't want to take this person on holiday with them, the picker can choose to have one last random spin which can select anyone from the wheel, the person selected is the person the picker must take without the option to find out more about the person.

== Transmissions ==
=== Series ===
Series	Start date	End date	Episodes
1	11 March 2012	13 May 2012	10
2	4 January 2013	1 March 2013	9

=== Special ===
Date	Entitle
21 December 2012	Christmas Special
