= Jonathan and Charlotte =

English music duo

- Born: Jonathan Antoine; 13 January 1995 (age 31); Charlotte Jaconelli; 24 August 1995 (age 31); Essex, United Kingdom
- Genres: Classical crossover
- Years active: 2012–2014
- Label: Syco/Columbia (2012–14)
- Past members: Jonathan Antoine; Charlotte Jaconelli
- Website: www.jonathancharlotte.com

Jonathan Antoine (born 13 January 1995) and Charlotte Jaconelli (born 24 August 1995), known collectively as Jonathan and Charlotte, were an English classical crossover duo from Essex. They finished as runners-up in the sixth series of Britain's Got Talent in 2012, being beaten by dancing dog act Ashleigh and Pudsey. At the time, they were aged 17 and 16 respectively. Despite not winning, the young duo were offered a £1 million record deal by Simon Cowell on his record label Syco. They released two albums, Together in 2012 and Perhaps Love in 2013. In February 2014, the duo decided to split and embark on solo careers.

== Career ==
=== Formation and career beginnings ===
Both were unknown prior to Britain's Got Talent, but were paired together at West Hatch High School, in Chigwell, Essex by the school's singing coach Jenny Ewington. Their head of music, Ginette Tomlinson, chose "The Prayer", originally performed by Andrea Bocelli and Celine Dion, which they sang for their GCSE and also at their teacher's church wedding ceremony. Before shooting to fame on the hit TV show, Charlotte was training full-time in Musical Theatre at the Arts Educational Schools, London, while Jonathan was training classically at the Royal Academy of Music part-time as a junior.

=== Britain's Got Talent ===
==== Audition ====
Their first Britain's Got Talent performance together was in the Series 6 audition held in London, aired 24 March 2012. There they began the contest as "Charlotte and Jonathan" and sang "The Prayer". Although all judges were deeply impressed by the performance, Simon Cowell advised Jonathan he should "dump" Charlotte, considering she would hold him back in the competition, but the pair remained together, and the act's name was reversed.

The similarities to the Britain's Got Talent debut and initial judge and audience reaction to Susan Boyle was noted by many:

"It was almost a case of deja vu. An overweight, badly dressed contestant lumbers awkwardly on to the Britain's Got Talent stage, prompting the judges to roll their eyes at the inevitable car-crash of a performance to follow . . . only to be wowed by the powerful, pitch-perfect voices of the unlikely stars." Simon Cowell said that Jonathan's voice sounded as good as Luciano Pavarotti's, and he had not heard such a superb opera voice in years.

==== Semi-final ====
They participated in the semi-final which was held on 7 May 2012. The song, performed as a duet, was "Caruso", written by Lucio Dalla.

The judges commented as follows:

Alesha Dixon: "Charlotte, there was a lot of pressure on you tonight, and let me tell you, you held your own, you started that song so beautifully. And this is a special friendship, and there is special chemistry between you, and when you sang, Jonathan, I felt that in every part of my body."

Amanda Holden continued: "It was just a tour de force. I didn't see you the first time [at the auditions], I watched the YouTube clip like everyone else. You literally blew me back into my seat. I've always appreciated your friendship and I kind of leaned towards what Simon said in the audition, but now you work beautifully together."

Simon Cowell: "There is a lot at stake here and like I said at the first audition, Charlotte, I believed you were holding Jonathan back. And you made the decision to stay together, Jonathan, and I have to say that was the best decision you ever made. I understand your chemistry, I understand the support. Charlotte, you sang really, really well tonight." He finished by admitting that: "That was one of my favourite ever Britain's Got Talent performances."

David Walliams concluded the praise by telling the duo: "Well done for proving Simon wrong. I have no clue what you were singing about, but I wanted to cry! You are such fantastic singers. You could be winners on Saturday night."

==== Final ====
In the final, held on 12 May 2012, they appeared 11th, again performing "The Prayer", and received a standing ovation for their performance. Fans expressed disappointment that the duo did not win first place, but Charlotte responded by saying, "Oh my God, we came second out of 70,000 people, it's incredible, it's been amazing."

=== 2012: Together ===
It was confirmed the day after (13 May 2012), that Simon Cowell was in negotiations to offer Jonathan and Charlotte a £1 million recording contract with his record label, Syco. They said they would be pleased to accept the contract, although also wanted to do some musical theatre in the future. The pair were later offered a contract, which would see them release their debut album around Christmas.

Their debut album Together was released on 24 September 2012 in the UK. The album was officially released in the US on 30 October 2012.

=== ITV documentary: Jonathan and Charlotte ===
A documentary following the young teenagers' success since the show was aired on ITV on 2 November 2012 at 9pm. It focuses on how the two British teenagers rose to fame, and what has happened since. It also includes interviews with those who knew them best.

They toured Italy and France, aiming to complete their musical education – a "finishing school" for talent show graduates. They received guidance from Luciano Pavarotti's vocal coach, Leone Magiera, visited the home of Italian opera, La Scala, and received a masterclass with acclaimed tenor, Popstar to Operastar's Rolando Villazon in Paris. The singers are reunited with their old nemesis, Simon Cowell, who apologised for the mistake he made in suggesting they split. They also receive career advice from Katherine Jenkins and at the Classic Brits, host Myleene Klass congratulates them on their chart success.

=== 2013: Perhaps Love ===
Their second album was released on 14 October 2013. Jaconelli described the album as "an album of covers, some classical songs but also pieces that are less predictable than our first album. There are our interpretations of more modern songs like "You Got The Love" by Florence and the Machine and "Falling Slowly" from the musical Once." She also stated that they recorded some solo songs.

=== Split ===
In February 2014, the duo decided to split after both having been offered solo record deals by Sony Classical. Charlotte released her first solo album, Solitaire, in July 2014. Jonathan released his first solo album, Tenore, in October 2014. In a statement on their website, Jonathan and Charlotte said:

We have had the most exciting journey together ever since meeting at West Hatch High School in 2006 and are so happy for each other. To come second on BGT and sell over quarter of a million albums was beyond our wildest dreams. To now be offered our own solo record deals by Sony Classical is the most exciting thing ever and we are thrilled to be going back into the recording studio so soon. For those that voted for us, bought our CDs and saw us in concert – thank you. We hope to see you soon at our own shows. Love Jonathan and Charlotte".

== Discography ==
=== Albums ===
Title	Album details	Peak chart positions					Certifications
Title	Album details	UK	IRE	SCO	US Class.	US Heat.	Certifications
Together	Released: 24 September 2012; Label: Syco Music; Format: CD, digital download	5	32	7	7	5	BPI: Gold
Perhaps Love	Released: 14 October 2013; Label: Sony Classical (UK), Sony Masterworks (USA); Format: CD, digital download	5	—	8	9	—	BPI: Silver
