= Together (Jonathan and Charlotte album) =

Studio album by Jonathan and Charlotte
- Released: 24 September 2012
- Recorded: 2012
- Genre: Classical crossover
- Label: Syco; Columbia
- Producer: Graham Stack

Jonathan and Charlotte chronology
Together (2012)	Perhaps Love (2013)

Together is the debut studio album by British classical crossover duo Jonathan and Charlotte, released on 24 September 2012. The duo began recording the album in May 2012, after signing a £1m record deal with Simon Cowell's label Syco Music. It was produced by Graham Stack at Metrophonic Studios in Surrey, England over a period of 8 weeks.

The album includes Italian covers of various songs from the likes of Elton John, Muse, Take That, R.E.M., Queen, and Peggy Seeger. They released the first song on the album, "The Prayer", together with the act that finished in third place in 2012, Only Boys Aloud. Together peaked at number 5 on the UK Albums Chart, which was followed by the duo releasing the album in the US and Canada on 30 October 2012.

== Track listing ==
No.	Title	Length
1.	"The Prayer"	4:02
2.	"Caruso"	3:59
3.	"Vero Amore"	3:20
4.	"Ave Maria"	3:18
5.	"Forse"	3:17
6.	"Il Mondo È Nostro"	3:08
7.	"Canto della Terra"	3:45
8.	"Ognuno Soffre"	3:45
9.	"Chi Mai Vivrà Per Sempre?"	3:42
10.	"La Prima Volta"	3:45

== Charts and certifications ==
=== Weekly charts ===
Chart (2012)	Peak position
Belgian Albums (Ultratop Flanders)	156
Irish Albums (IRMA)	32
Scottish Albums (OCC)	7
UK Albums (OCC)	5

=== Year-end charts ===
Chart (2012)	Position
UK Albums (OCC)	75

=== Certifications ===
Region	Certification	Certified units/sales
United Kingdom (BPI)	Gold	100,000^{^}
^{^} Shipments figures based on certification alone.

== Release history ==
Region	Date	Format	Label
United Kingdom	21 September 2012	Digital download	Syco
United Kingdom	24 September 2012	CD	Syco
United States	30 October 2012	CD	Syco / Columbia
Canada	30 October 2012	CD	Syco / Columbia
