= Pet School =

British children's television series

- Genre: Animals; Pets
- Presented by: Aaron Craze (2012); Luke Franks (2013)
- Country of origin: United Kingdom
- Original language: English
- No. of series: 2
- No. of episodes: 20

Production
- Executive producers: Nick Cory-Wright; Camilla Lewis; Kez Margrie
- Producers: Chris Atteshlis; Tim Duck; David Taylor
- Running time: 28 minutes
- Production company: Cineflix

Original release
- Network: BBC One (2012); CBBC
- Release: 3 December 2012 – 20 December 2013

Related
- Who Let the Dogs Out?

Pet School is a children's series for the BBC that began airing on 3 December 2012. It was hosted by Aaron Craze for the first series and Luke Franks for the second.

Series 1: Pet Heads: Chris, Giulia, Liam, Micah, Rachel, Sam, Sophie, Tej, Ysabel.

Series 2: Pet Heads: Ananya, Chloe, Courtney, Faramarz, Lauren, Sam, Tommy, Thomas, William.

== Transmission ==
Series	Start date	End date	Episodes
1	3 December 2012	14 December 2012	10
2	9 December 2013	20 December 2013	10
