= Aaron Craze =

English celebrity chef

Aaron Craze is an English celebrity chef who often appears in the ITV Food series Saturday Cookbook. He also presented CBBC shows Junior Bake Off and Pet School.
