= Trickster (musician) =

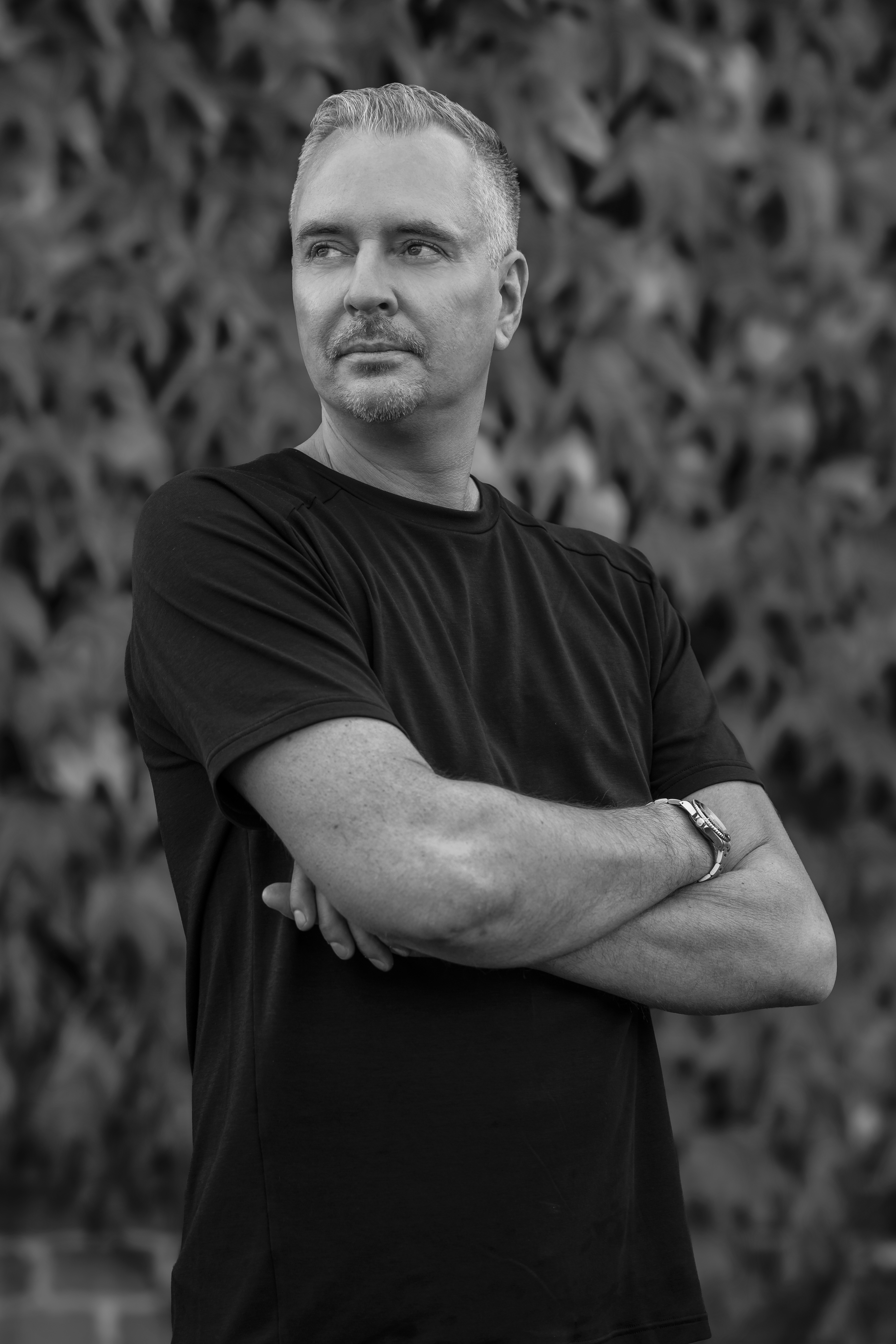
- Juergen Pichler (Trickster)

Background information
- Born: Juergen Walter Pichler; Austria
- Occupations: musician, music producer, songwriter
- Instruments: vocals, piano

Trickster (real name: Juergen Pichler) is an Austrian musician living in the UK.

== Musical career ==
The singer Trickster debuted in November 2022 with the single "Thank Fuck It's Christmas", in which he performed alongside the Royal Philharmonic Orchestra a not safe for work expletive-ridden song that reflected the tensions and stresses of that year. The lyrics were written by Guy Chambers (Robbie Williams was the songwriter and producer), in collaboration with the comedian Steve Furst and Trickster. Billed as "the only Christmas song that could have come out of 2022", its lyrics took aim at problematic factors of that year, like the UK government's activity, the cost of living crisis, pandemics, and the ultra-rich trying to colonise Mars.

A clean version titled "Praise Be It's Christmas" was also released, and its two videos went viral, with several million views on YouTube. One of these music videos was directed by Phil Griffin (known for his work with Amy Winehouse, Diana Ross, Paul McCartney) and the other one, shot in the Swiss Alps, was directed by Norbert Blecha (Requiem for Dominic, Wolfsliebe).

Money and food items were donated by Trickster to charities tackling child welfare and social hunger. Under the motto "real change is no joke", Trickster and his team distributed food produce to several food banks in the UK. The South-West Belfast Foodbank, in one of the most deprived areas, received a significant boost through this campaign (it almost missed out because, at first, it thought it was a prank, given the unexpected amount directed towards this rather unsupported area of the country). Specific attention to details, like the nutritional value of the food provided, were explained by the singer by his own childhood experiences with adequate nutrition insecurity.

In these music videos, Trickster's real identity was hidden by animation, which prompted speculation about who he might be. Some wondered if he was the lyrics co-writer Furst or some popular personality Chambers had worked with previously or a faded former famous name with a score to settle.

In May 2023, Trickster released the single "Still Kicking", inspired by a car accident he survived in 2017 in southern France, with a musicality described as drawing on late '90s alternative rock, Americana and cinematic soundscapes. The track was produced by Chambers, Richard Flack and Trickster. The music video features the singer without animation and more information appeared in the press mentioning that he was an Austrian residing in the UK.

In November 2023, Trickster released "Silent Night" vs "Santa Claus Is Coming to Town", a mash-up blend of the two Christmas classics, featuring the vocal group The Swingles. This time, the media coverage mentioned this singer's real name, Juergen Pichler. He was already known as a producer of bands and musicians (such as the Austrian band Hunger) and as a songwriter (such as Patrick Lindner's Olé Hola ). He also supported charity initiatives, such as "Stop the Puppy Mafia" in Austria.

On 23 April 2024 (Saint George's Day), Trickster launched his version of the UK national anthem "God Save the King", recorded with the Royal Philharmonic Orchestra at Abbey Road. He said he wanted to create this version to express his love for the United Kingdom. In the production phase, when returning from Portugal as a co-pilot on a helicopter, he had to make an emergency landing on a farm in north-western Spain, due to technical difficulties.

== Discography ==
- "Thank Fuck It's Christmas" / "Praise Be It's Christmas (Clean Version)" (single, 2022)
- "Still Kicking" (single, 2023)
- "Silent Night" vs "Santa Claus Is Coming to Town" (single, 2023)
- "Be Careful What You Wish for" (single, 2024)
- "God Save the King" (single, 2024)
