= Fleece (band) =

Canadian indie rock band

- Origin: Montreal, Quebec, Canada
- Genres: Indie rock; neo-psychedelic
- Years active: 2013–present
- Members: Matthew Rogers; Megan Ennenberg; Ethan Soil; Jameson Daniel
- Past members: Gabe Miller; Colin Spratt; Jonathan Bell

Fleece are a Canadian indie rock band, originating from Montreal. It consists of Matthew Rogers (vocals/keyboard), Megan Ennenberg (guitar/vocals), Jameson Daniel (guitar), and Ethan Soil (drums). They released their first album Scavenger in 2015, and gained notoriety when Rogers' and Soil's "how to write an Alt-J song" went viral on YouTube in May 2015. They released their second album Voyager in 2017 and Stunning & Atrocious in 2021.

== History ==
Rogers, Soil and Gabe Miller began jamming together as teenagers in Toronto during summer camp. The band was formed in 2013 when the trio left for Montreal to study at Concordia and McGill University, meeting Jonathan Bell and Colin Spratt. Their debut album, Scavenger was named after their patchy process of arranging eclectic pieces of music. In May 2015, the band uploaded "how to write an Alt-J song" on YouTube, a humorous parody of the band, which included Soil and Rogers eating rice cakes during the performance. In response to the video going viral, Alt-J briefly changed their Twitter display picture to a rice cake.

Bell and Spratt left, while Ennenberg and Daniel joined between the band's second album, Voyager, which was released in January 2017. Fleece funded the album's 17-show American tour on Kickstarter.

In June 2020, the band released "So Long". The proceeds from the first month of streams were donated to the Black Youth Helpline, the Black Coalition for AIDS Prevention and the Native Women's Association of Canada.

The band reformed as a "queer quartet" for their third album, Stunning & Atrocious, which was released in August 2021. The band toured North America through the fall.

In July 2025, Fleece announced their fourth album, TORNADO, written and recorded in 2023, would be released in October.

== Musical style and influences ==
Fleece's earlier work has drawn comparisons to Radiohead, Pixies, and Tame Impala. Exclaim! drew comparisons of the band's sophomore effort to psychedelic, grunge, and Toronto jazz trio BADBADNOTGOOD. In an interview with Indie88, Rogers cited improvisation as a crucial part of their artistic process.

== Discography ==
=== Albums ===
- 2015: Scavenger
- 2017: Voyager
- 2021: Stunning & Atrocious
- 2025: Tornado

=== Singles ===
- 2020: "Love Song for the Haters"
- 2020: "So Long"
- 2020: "Upside Down"
- 2020: "Do U Mind? (Leave the Light On)"
- 2021: "Bodies Lie"
- 2023: "It's the Life"
- 2023: "Do You Wanna Party"
- 2023: "Stay At Home Boy"
- 2024: "Take Off All Your Honey"
- 2024: "Where's My Beach Hat"
- 2025: "So Much Better Now"
- 2025: "Chequebook"
- 2025: "How Far Would You Go"
- 2025: "Indecisive Little Mess"

=== Music videos ===
- 2020: "Upside Down"
- 2021: "Do U Mind? (Leave the Light On)"

== Members ==
=== Current members ===
- Matthew Rogers – vocals, keyboard
- Megan Ennenberg – vocals, guitar
- Ethan Soil – drums
- Jameson Daniel – guitar, vocals

=== Past members ===
- Gabe Miller
- Colin Spratt
- Jonathan Bell
