= Playhouse, Whitley Bay =

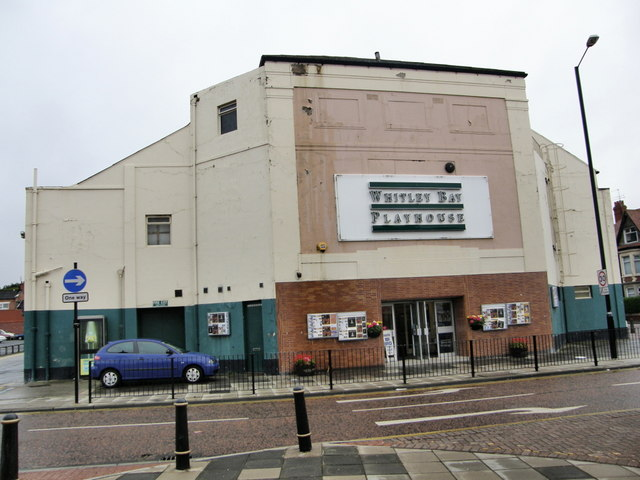

- Location in Tyne and Wear

General information
- Location: Tyne and Wear, England, UK
- Coordinates: 55.0468°N 1.4502°W
- OS grid: NZ351726

The Playhouse, Whitley Bay is a state of the art, 630 seater auditorium in the coastal resort of Whitley Bay, Tyne and Wear.

Having undergone a major and completed refurbishment by North Tyneside Council in 2009, the contemporary theatre has a glass foyer, front of house facilities, box office and bar facilities. In addition it also features a redesigned auditorium, new company room and chorus rooms.

The transformation of the venue, situated on Marine Avenue, was a key part of North Tyneside Council's £64million regeneration programme for Whitley Bay. It has become an integral part of the local community programme, regularly playing host to productions from local artistic and drama groups.

The Playhouse is managed by SMG, who locally own and manage Newcastle's 11,000+ seater Metro Radio Arena and 1,100 seater Mill Volvo Tyne Theatre.

A specially-commissioned installation by artist Rolf Wojciechowski, is displayed in the North corridor of the theatre to mark the re-opening of the Playhouse Whitley Bay in 2009. A time capsule in the form of a wooden box has been made by longtime theatre supporter Rid Stokoe, and filled with a collection of memorabilia from its proud past.
