= Fleeceware =

Malware mobile application

Fleeceware is a type of malware mobile application that come with hidden, excessive subscription fees. These applications also take advantage of users who do not know how to cancel a subscription to keep charging them long after they have deleted the application. As of 2020, more than 600 million users installed Android fleeceware apps from the Play Store. The term was coined in 2019 by British researchers.
