= Here's to Christmas =

Studio album by Chris Kamara
- Released: 15 November 2019
- Recorded: 2019
- Label: So What?; Silva Screen Records

Here's to Christmas is the debut studio album by English former professional footballer and football manager Chris Kamara. It was released on 15 November 2019 by So What? and Silva Screen Records. The album peaked at number 8 on the UK Albums Chart.

== Background ==
In an interview, Kamara said he has always been a fan of big band music. He also said "Here’s To Christmas is something I’m really proud of and I think it stands up as something fun, but something that doesn’t sound half bad too – an album to get everyone into the swing of Christmas!"

== Critical reception ==
Rachel Howdle from The Irish Times, gave the album a positive review stating, "Chris Kamara has delivered a smooth, big band swing album that is pure class – and sounds, just like Kammy! And it works. [...] Lay down your misgivings and pick up your mulled wine and listen to the Christmas album you never knew you needed."

== Commercial performance ==
On 22 November 2019, Here's to Christmas entered the UK Albums Chart at number eight. The album also entered the Scottish Albums Chart at number eight.

== Track listing ==
No.	Title	Length
1.	"Let It Snow!"	2:50
2.	"Here’s to Christmas"	3:15
3.	"Winter Wonderland"	2:35
4.	"Rudolph the Red Nosed Reindeer"	2:59
5.	"Santa Claus Is Coming to Town"	3:14
6.	"Jingle Bells"	2:53
7.	"Frosty the Snowman"	3:10
8.	"Santa Baby"	3:55
9.	"It’s Beginning to Look a Lot Like Christmas"	3:03
10.	"Have Yourself a Merry Little Christmas"	3:17

== Charts ==
Chart (2019)	Peak position
Scottish Albums (OCC)	8
UK Albums (OCC)	8
