= Britain's Got Talent series 6 =

Season of television series

Britain's Got Talent
- Series 6
- Hosted by: Ant & Dec (ITV); Stephen Mulhern (ITV2)
- Judges: David Walliams; Alesha Dixon; Amanda Holden; Simon Cowell; Carmen Electra (London auditions)
- Winner: Ashleigh and Pudsey
- Runner-up: Jonathan and Charlotte

Release
- Original network: ITV; ITV2 (BGMT)
- Original release: 24 March – 12 May 2012

Series chronology
- ← Previous; Series 5 Next → Series 7

The sixth series of British talent competition programme Britain's Got Talent was broadcast on ITV, from 24 March to 12 May 2012. The sixth series saw Simon Cowell resume a full commitment to the programme following the previous series, yet neither David Hasselhoff and Michael McIntyre returned to take part in the new series, leading to them being replaced by Alesha Dixon and David Walliams. Because of her pregnancy during filming of the auditions, Amanda Holden was required to miss a number of sessions, leading to producers asking Carmen Electra to step in as a guest judge in her place.

The sixth series of the programme saw a full commitment of incorporating a panel of four judges throughout every stage of the competition. The prize money offered by Britain's Got Talent was increased to £500,000 for this series only, the highest amount offered in the programme's history. In addition, the format of the programme saw a number of changes, including nine semi-finalists in each semi-final, the establishment of a Wildcard format similar to that used in America's Got Talent - in which the judges could appoint a single place in the final to any eliminated semi-finalist they favoured the most - and the incorporation of a mobile voting app, which functioned differently to the system used on The X Factor.

The sixth series was won by dancing dog act Ashleigh and Pudsey, with opera duo Jonathan and Charlotte finishing in second place and choir Only Boys Aloud third. Many of the semi-finalists that took part in the competition were considered some of the best in the programme's history by 2012. During its broadcast, the series averaged around 10.6 million viewers. The programme faced controversy concerning two auditions and a mishap with the new voting system, of which Ofcom had to investigate ITV's handling in regards to two of these incidents that viewers raised complaints against.

== Series overview ==
Judges and Presenter(s) for Britain's Got Talent Series 6

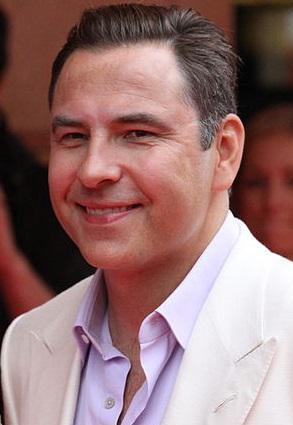
David Walliams

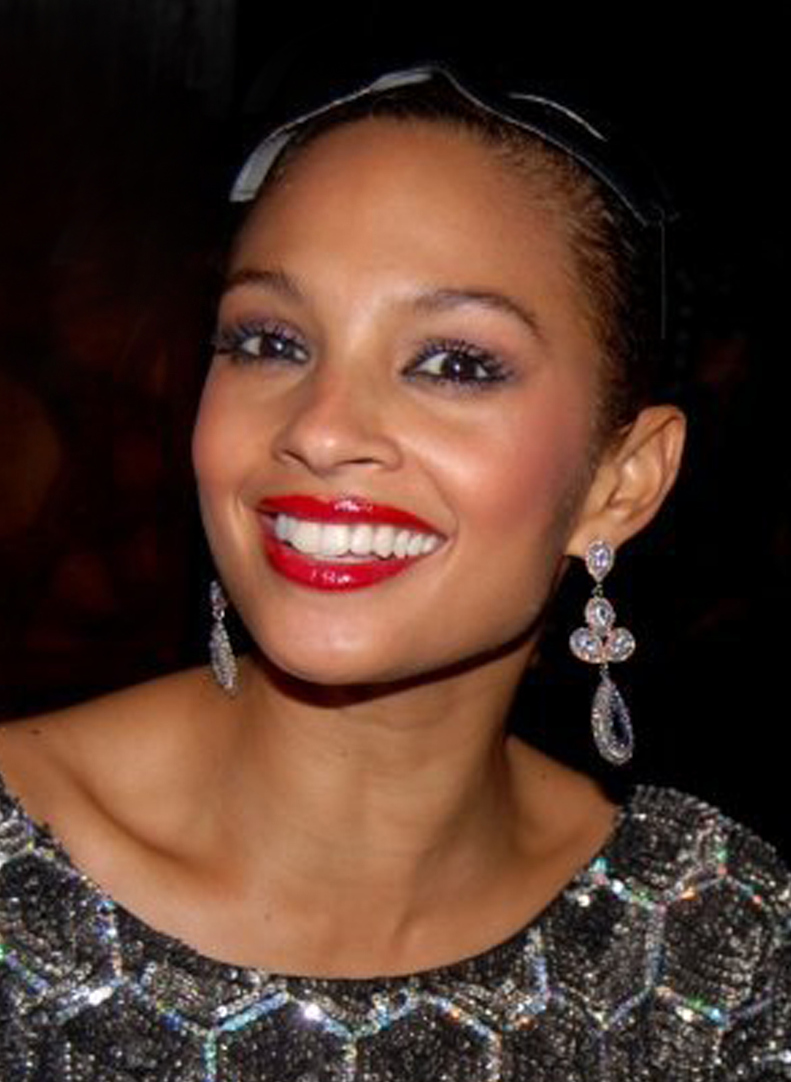
Alesha Dixon

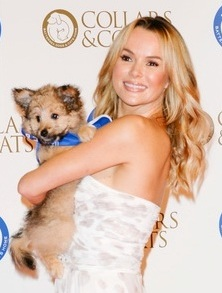
Amanda Holden

Simon Cowell

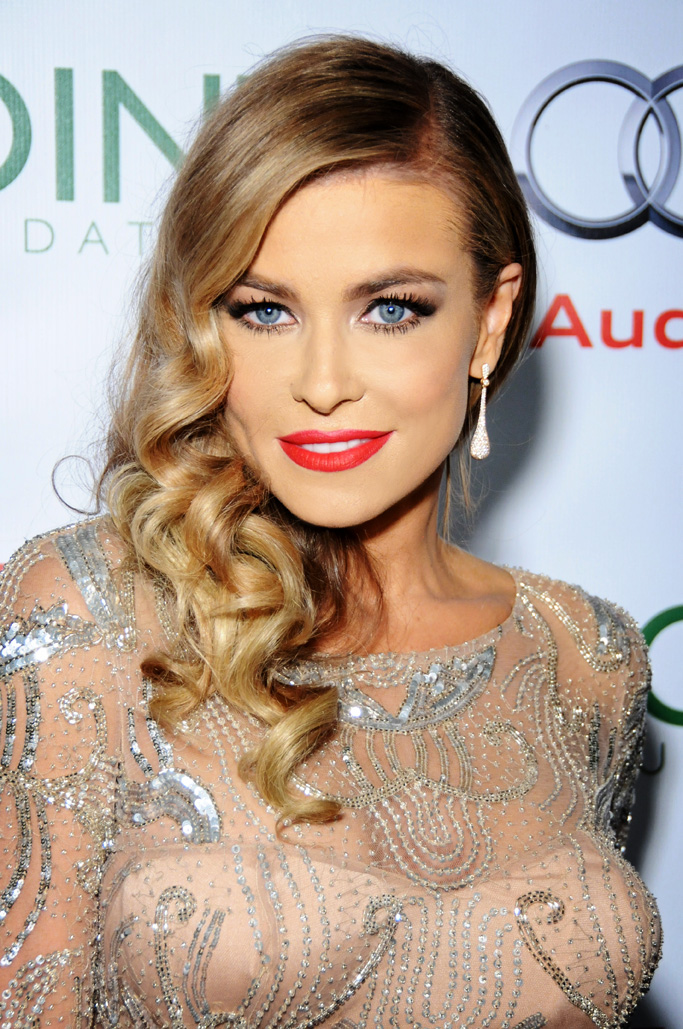
Carmen Electra (Guest)

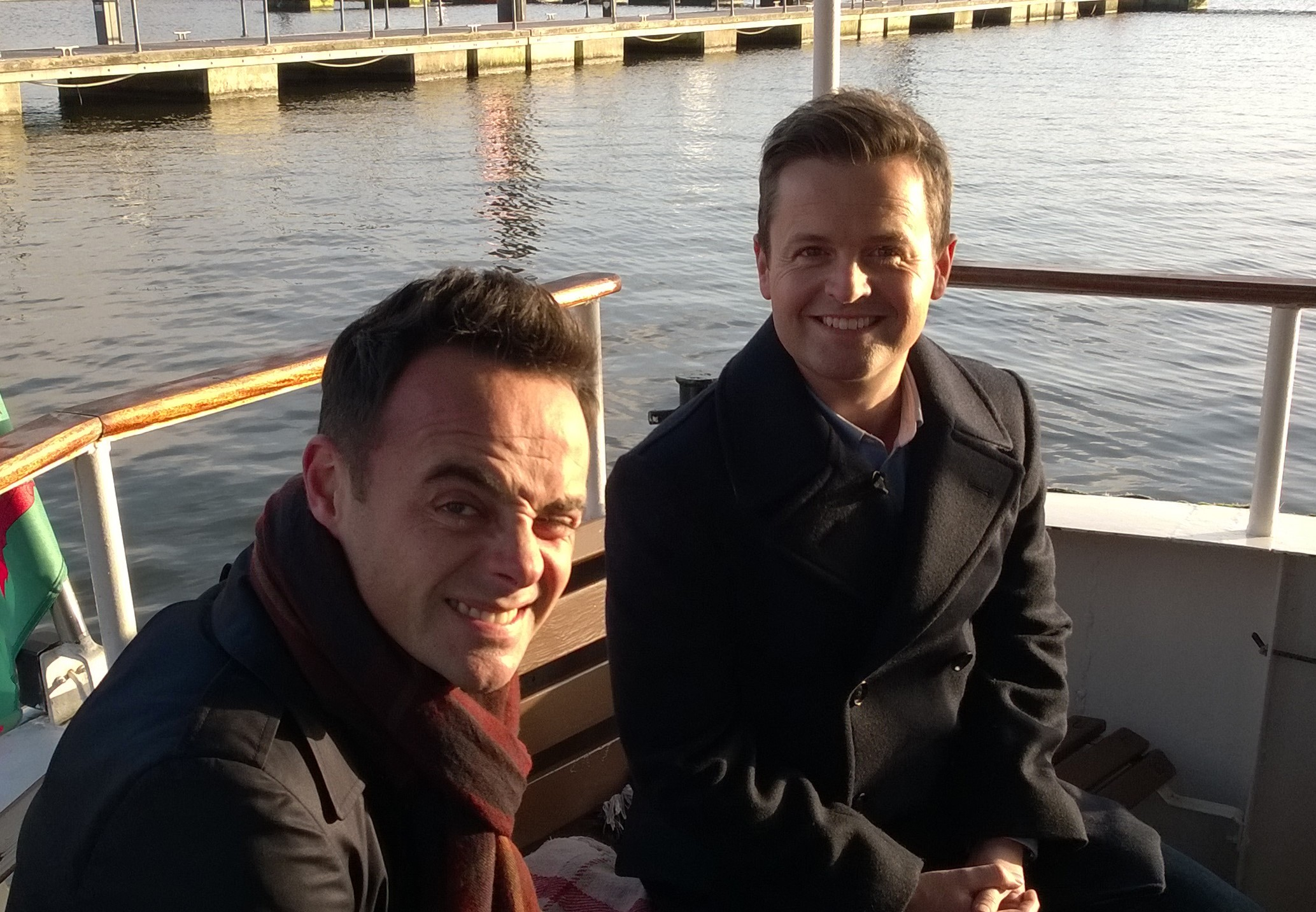
Ant & Dec (ITV1)

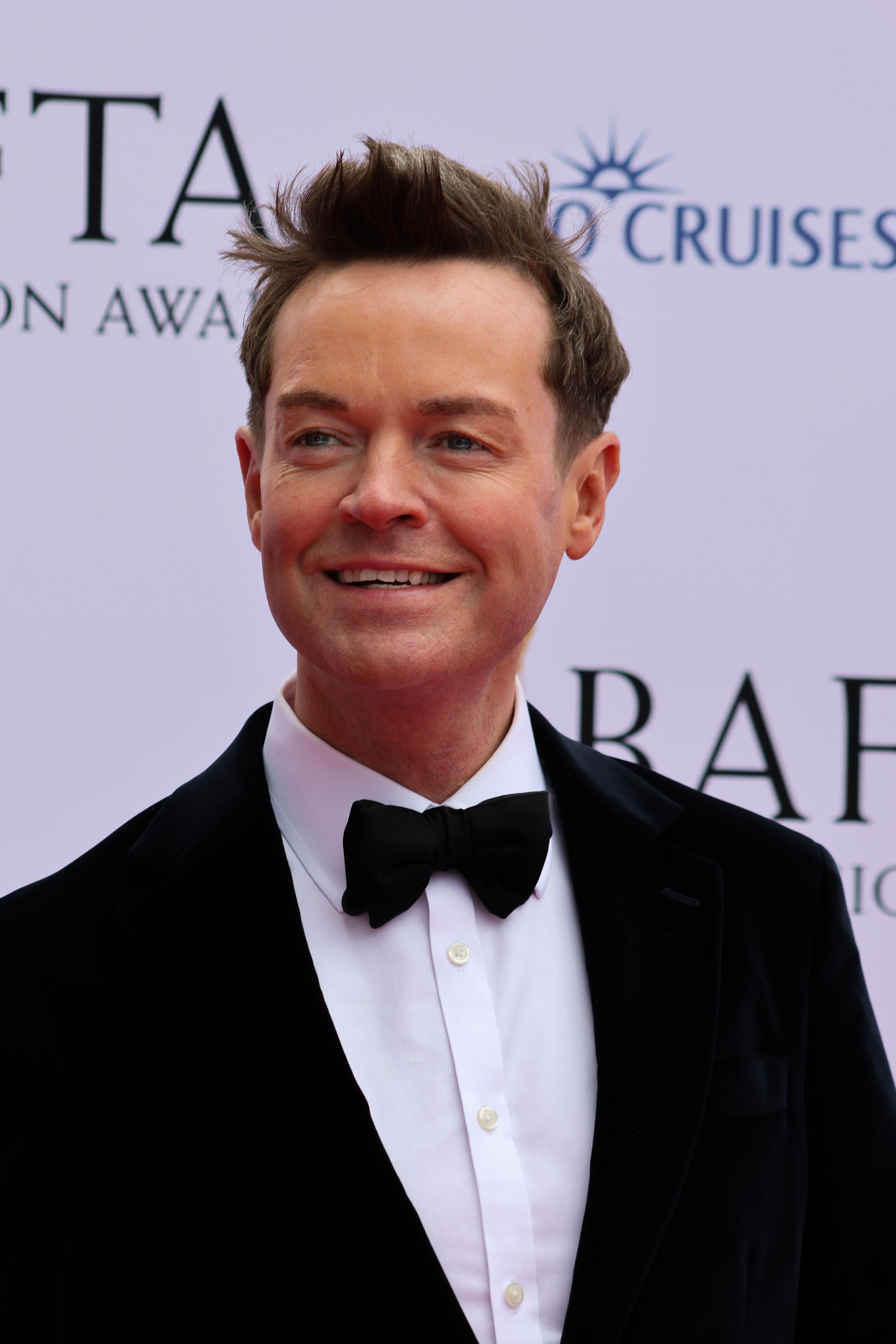
Stephen Mulhern (ITV2)

Following open auditions held the previous year, the Judges' auditions were held during January and February 2012, within Manchester, Blackpool, Cardiff, London, Edinburgh and Birmingham. Like the previous series, a number of acts were invited to audition between 6 and 22 January, after being found via their videos on YouTube. Twenty-five participants from this were picked by the producers and revealed by Britain's Got More Talent host Stephen Mulhern via a live YouTube stream from backstage at the London auditions, in which the YouTube community voted on their favourites between 6 and 13 February, with the winning acts later performing before the judges after the results of the vote on 18 February. Between 25 and 31 January, the sponsors of the show for this series, Virgin Media, ran addition auditions for the show via videos made on YouTube and/or Vimeo, which, while adhering to the same rules, were restricted to only Virgin Media customer, with the five winning acts later performing for the judges during the Birmingham auditions.

Following the previous series, both David Hasselhoff and Michael McIntyre announced that they wouldn't be returning for another year of the competition. Their decision led to the producers seeking out their replacements, after deciding to maintain the use of four judges in the programme following Cowell's announcement in December 2011 that he would be returning to oversee auditions for the sixth series. Both Hasselhoff and McIntyre were eventually replaced by comedian David Walliams, and singer and TV presenter Alesha Dixon, the latter having previously been a judge on BBC's Strictly Come Dancing. Owing to her pregnancy entering its late stages, Holden was forced to be absent from the London and Blackpool auditions. Therefore, the Blackpool auditions were a 3-judge panel with only Dixon, Cowell and Walliams. For the London auditions, the production team brought in American actress and model Carmen Electra as a guest judge to oversee London auditions in her place. Holden was cleared by doctors to return to overseeing the remainder of the auditions by the time the Edinburgh auditions rolled around. Apart from a change in the judging panel, the producers decided to increase the prize money offered to the winner of the series to £500,000, with Cowell pledging half of the prize money being offered to the winner.

Of the participants that took part, only forty five made it past this stage and into the five live semi-finals, with nine appearing in each one; this was a significant change after the last four series of the programme. In a change with the format, the live final featured ten acts that made it through the semi-finals, and one additional act dubbed "the Judges' wildcard" - if a semi-finalist was eliminated in their semi-final, they became eligible to be picked as a wildcard act for the final by the judges, with the choice made prior to the live final's broadcast. The wildcard for this series was boyband The Mend, after they lost out in the tied Judges' vote in the first semi-final. The following below lists the results of each participant's overall performance in this series:

Winner | Runner-up | Finalist
Semi-finalist | Judges' Wildcard Finalist

| Participant | Age(s) ^{1} | Genre | Performance Type | Semi-final | Result |
|---|---|---|---|---|---|
| Analiza Ching | 29 | Music | Violinist | 1 | Eliminated |
| Aquabatique ^{2} | 21–28 | Variety | Synchronised Swimmers | 5 | Finalist |
| Area 51 | 23–44 | Dance | Pyrotechnic Dance Group | 3 | Eliminated |
| Ashleigh and Pudsey | 17 & 6 ^{3} | Animals | Dog Act | 1 | Winner |
| Ashley Elliot | 16 | Music | Xylophonist | 3 | Eliminated |
| Be Minor | 13–14 | Singing | Girl Band | 4 | Eliminated |
| Beatrix von Bourbon | 27 | Dance | Burlesque Dancer | 4 | Eliminated |
| Billy George | 20 | Acrobatics | Cyr Wheel Acrobat | 5 | Eliminated |
| Brynolf & Ljung | 35 & 36 | Magic | Magic Duo | 4 | Eliminated |
| Callum Oakley | 16 | Comedy | Stand Up Comedian | 5 | Eliminated |
| Cascade | 22–35 | Acrobatics | Martial Arts Team | 2 | Eliminated |
| Chica Latina | 44 | Singing | Singer | 4 | Eliminated |
| Dennis Egel | 41 | Singing | Singer | 3 | Eliminated |
| Face Team | 19–28 | Acrobatics | Basketball Stunt Team | 5 | Eliminated |
| Fish on Percussion | 24 | Music | Percussionist | 2 | Eliminated |
| Four Corners | 17–25 | Dance | Dance Group | 2 | Eliminated |
| Gatis Kandis | 31 | Comedy | Stand Up Comedian | 4 | Eliminated |
| Graham Blackledge | 42 | Singing / Music | Singer & Organist | 2 | Eliminated |
| Greig Stewart | 27 | Music | Laser Harpist | 5 | Eliminated |
| Honey Shazad | 21 | Singing | Singer | 3 | Eliminated |
| Hope Murphy | 16 | Singing | Singer | 5 | Eliminated |
| Jonathan and Charlotte | 17 & 16 | Singing | Opera Singing Duo | 2 | Runner-Up |
| Kai & Natalia | 15 & 16 | Dance | Ballroom Dance Duo | 2 | Finalist |
| Karizma Krew | 14–38 | Dance | Street Dance Group | 2 | Eliminated |
| Lauren Thalia | 12 | Singing / Music | Singer & Guitarist | 1 | Eliminated |
| Loveable Rogues | 18–20 | Singing / Music | Acoustic Trio | 3 | Finalist |
| Lucky | 26 | Acrobatics | Contortionist | 3 | Eliminated |
| Malaki Paul | 9 | Singing | Singer | 4 | Eliminated |
| Martyn Crofts | 42 | Singing | Rapping Dalek Impersonator | 5 | Eliminated |
| Molly Rainford | 11 | Singing | Singer | 3 | Finalist |
| Nu Sxool | 10–17 | Dance | Dance Group | 4 | Finalist |
| Only Boys Aloud | 14–19 | Singing | Choir | 1 | Third Place |
| Paige Turley | 14 | Singing | Singer | 2 | Eliminated |
| Rachel Knowland | 25 | Singing | Singer | 1 | Eliminated |
| Ryan O'Shaughnessy | 19 | Singing / Music | Singer & Guitarist | 5 | Finalist |
| Sam Kelly | 19 | Singing / Music | Singer & Guitarist | 4 | Finalist |
| Strictly Wheels | 39 & 41 | Dance | Dance Duo | 5 | Eliminated |
| The Jive Aces | 34–49 | Music | Jazz Band | 1 | Eliminated |
| The Mend | 21–22 | Singing | Boy Band | 1 | Finalist |
| The Showbears | 34–53 | Singing | Entertainers | 2 | Eliminated |
| The Sugar Dandies | 40 & 40 | Dance | Ballroom Dance Duo | 4 | Eliminated |
| The Zimmers | 66–88 | Singing | Rap Group | 3 | Eliminated |
| Twist and Pulse Dance Company | 12–20 | Dance | Street Dance Group | 3 | Eliminated |
| United We Stand | 17–25 | Dance | Street Dance Group | 1 | Eliminated |
| Zipparah Tafari | 49 | Singing | Rapper | 1 | Eliminated |

- ^1 Ages denoted for a participant(s), pertain to their final performance for this series.
- ^2 Due to the nature of Aquabatique's performance, their live round performances had to be performed outside of the studio, with the judges and studio audience watching via screens.
- ^3 The latter value pertains to the age of the dog, as disclosed by its owner.

=== Semi-finals summary ===
Buzzed out | Judges' vote | Won the public vote
Won the judges' vote | Lost the judges' vote | Eliminated

==== Semi-final 1 (6 May) ====
- Guest performance: Tulisa ("Young")

| Semi-Finalist | Order | Performance Type | Buzzes and Judges' Vote | | | | Percentage | Result |
| Semi-Finalist | Order | Performance Type | Cowell | Holden | Dixon | Walliams | Percentage | Result |
|---|---|---|---|---|---|---|---|---|
| Zipparah Tafari | 1 | Rapper | | | | | 2.3% | 4th - Eliminated |
| The Jive Aces | 2 | Jazz Band | | | | | 1.0% | 7th - Eliminated |
| Lauren Thalia | 3 | Singer & Guitarist | | | | | 1.8% | 5th - Eliminated |
| United We Stand | 4 | Street Dance Group | | | | | 0.6% | 9th - Eliminated |
| Analiza Ching | 5 | Violinist | | | | | 0.9% | 8th - Eliminated |
| The Mend ^{4} | 6 | Boy Band | | | | | 11.8% | 3rd (Judges' vote tied - Lost on Public Vote) |
| Rachel Knowland | 7 | Singer | | | | | 1.2% | 6th - Eliminated |
| Ashleigh & Pudsey | 8 | Dog Act | | | | | 50.0% | 1st (Won Public vote) |
| Only Boys Aloud | 9 | Choir | | | | | 30.4% | 2nd (Judges' vote tied - Won on Public vote) |

- ^4 The Mend were later sent through to the final as the judges' wildcard.

==== Semi-final 2 (7 May) ====
- Guest performance: The Wanted ("Chasing The Sun")

| Semi-Finalist | Order | Performance Type | Buzzes and Judges' Vote | | | | Percentage | Result |
| Semi-Finalist | Order | Performance Type | Cowell | Holden | Dixon | Walliams | Percentage | Result |
|---|---|---|---|---|---|---|---|---|
| Cascade | 1 | Martial Arts Group | | | | | 1.6% | 8th - Eliminated |
| Paige Turley | 2 | Singer | | | | | 5.2% | 3rd (Lost Judges' vote) |
| Karizma Krew | 3 | Street Dance Group | | | | | 2.4% | 5th - Eliminated |
| The Showbears | 4 | Entertainers | | | | | 1.8% | 7th - Eliminated |
| Fish on Percussion | 5 | Percussionist | | | | | 0.9% | 9th - Eliminated |
| Graham Blackledge | 6 | Singer & Organist | | | | | 1.9% | 6th - Eliminated |
| Kai and Natalia | 7 | Ballroom Dance Duo | | | | | 6.2% | 2nd (Won Judges' vote) |
| Four Corners | 8 | Dance Group | | | | | 4.7% | 4th - Eliminated |
| Jonathan and Charlotte | 9 | Opera Singing Duo | | | | | 75.3% | 1st (Won Public vote) |

==== Semi-final 3 (8 May) ====
- Guest performance: LMFAO ("Party Rock Anthem"/"Sexy and I Know It")

| Semi-Finalist | Order | Performance Type | Buzzes and Judges' Vote | | | | Percentage | Result |
| Semi-Finalist | Order | Performance Type | Cowell | Holden | Dixon | Walliams | Percentage | Result |
|---|---|---|---|---|---|---|---|---|
| The Zimmers | 1 | Rap Group | | | | | 3.3% | 6th - Eliminated |
| Area 51 | 2 | Pyrotechnic Dance Group | | | | | 2.2% | 8th - Eliminated |
| Ashley Elliot | 3 | Xylophonist | | | | | 4.9% | 5th - Eliminated |
| Molly Rainford | 4 | Singer | | | | | 22.2% | 2nd (Judges' vote tied - Won on Public vote) |
| Lucky | 5 | Contortionist | | | | | 2.7% | 7th - Eliminated |
| Loveable Rogues | 6 | Acoustic Trio | | | | | 40.4% | 1st (Won Public vote) |
| Honey Shazad | 7 | Singer | | | | | 1.2% | 9th - Eliminated |
| Twist and Pulse Dance Company | 8 | Street Dance Group | | | | | 17.6% | 3rd (Judges' vote tied - Lost on Public vote) |
| Dennis Egel | 9 | Singer | | | | | 5.5% | 4th - Eliminated |

==== Semi-final 4 (9 May) ====
- Guest performance: Labrinth ("Express Yourself")

| Semi-Finalist | Order | Performance Type | Buzzes and Judges' Vote | | | | Percentage | Result |
| Semi-Finalist | Order | Performance Type | Cowell | Holden | Dixon | Walliams | Percentage | Result |
|---|---|---|---|---|---|---|---|---|
| Chica Latina | 1 | Singer | | | | | 0.6% | 9th - Eliminated |
| Brynolf and Ljung | 2 | Illusion Duo | | | | | 7.3% | 5th - Eliminated |
| Malaki Paul | 3 | Singer | | | | | 25.2% | 2nd (Lost Judges' vote) |
| Gatis Kandis | 4 | Stand Up Comedian | | | | | 6.5% | 6th - Eliminated |
| The Sugar Dandies | 5 | Ballroom Dance Duo | | | | | 2.8% | 7th - Eliminated |
| Nu Sxool | 6 | Dance Troupe | | | | | 20.0% | 3rd (Won Judges' vote) |
| Beatrix von Bourbon | 7 | Burlesque Dancer | | | | | 1.1% | 8th - Eliminated |
| Sam Kelly | 8 | Singer & Guitarist | | | | | 26.8% | 1st (Won Public vote) |
| Be Minor | 9 | Girl Band | | | | | 9.7% | 4th - Eliminated |

==== Semi-final 5 (10 May) ====
- Guest performance: Rebecca Ferguson ("Teach Me How to Be Loved")

| Semi-Finalist | Order | Performance Type | Buzzes and Judges' Vote | | | | Percentage | Result |
| Semi-Finalist | Order | Performance Type | Cowell | Holden | Dixon | Walliams | Percentage | Result |
|---|---|---|---|---|---|---|---|---|
| Face Team | 1 | Basketball Stunt Team | | | | | 7.4% | 6th - Eliminated |
| Greig Stewart | 2 | Laser Harpist | | | | | 1.6% | 9th - Eliminated |
| Billy George | 3 | Cyr Wheel Acrobat | | | | | 11.0% | 3rd (Lost Judges' vote) |
| Martyn Crofts | 4 | Dalek Voice Impersonator | | | | | 3.0% | 8th - Eliminated |
| Callum Oakley | 5 | Stand Up Comedian | | | | | 9.0% | 4th - Eliminated |
| Hope Murphy | 6 | Singer | | | | | 7.6% | 5th - Eliminated |
| Strictly Wheels | 7 | Dance Duo | | | | | 3.5% | 7th - Eliminated |
| Aquabatique | 8 | Synchronised Swimmers | | | | | 14.6% | 2nd (Won Judges' vote) |
| Ryan O'Shaughnessy | 9 | Singer & Guitarist | | | | | 42.3% | 1st (Won Public vote) |

=== Final (12 May) ===
Guest Performers, Results Show: Susan Boyle, Diversity & Paul Gbegbaje, and The Show Bears (featuring David Walliams)

Winner | Runner-up

| Finalist | Order | Performance Type | Percentage | Finished |
|---|---|---|---|---|
| The Mend | 1 | Boy Band | 2.6% | 7th |
| Sam Kelly | 2 | Singer & Guitarist | 1.0% | 9th |
| Nu Sxool | 3 | Dance Group | 1.2% | 8th |
| Molly Rainford | 4 | Singer | 2.8% | 6th |
| Loveable Rogues | 5 | Acoustic Trio | 5.7% | 4th |
| Kai and Natalia | 6 | Ballroom Dance Duo | 0.4% | 11th |
| Aquabatique | 7 | Synchronised Swimmers | 0.9% | 10th |
| Ryan O'Shaughnessy | 8 | Singer & Guitarist | 4.8% | 5th |
| Only Boys Aloud | 9 | Choir | 15.8% | 3rd |
| Ashleigh and Pudsey | 10 | Dog Act | 39.0% | 1st |
| Jonathan and Charlotte | 11 | Opera Singing Duo | 25.8% | 2nd |

== Ratings ==
| Episode | Air Date | Total viewers (millions) | ITV1 Weekly rank | Viewer Share (%) |
|---|---|---|---|---|
| Auditions 1 | 24 March | 11.57 | 3 | 39.2 |
| Auditions 2 | 31 March | 12.17 | 1 | 41.3 |
| Auditions 3 | 7 April | 11.95 | 1 | 38.7 |
| Auditions 4 | 14 April | 12.18 | 1 | 39.5 |
| Auditions 5 | 21 April | 11.60 | 1 | 38.2 |
| Auditions 6 | 28 April | 11.97 | 1 | 41.8 |
| Auditions 7 | 5 May | 11.27 | 1 | 38.9 |
| Semi-final 1 | 6 May | 11.01 | 2 | 35.5 |
| Semi-final 2 | 7 May | 10.77 | 2 | 35.6 |
| Semi-final 2 results | 7 May | 9.44 | 9 | 32.4 |
| Semi-final 3 | 8 May | 9.12 | 12 | 33.5 |
| Semi-final 3 results | 8 May | 7.91 | 15 | 27.8 |
| Semi-final 4 | 9 May | 10.15 | 3 | 37.6 |
| Semi-final 4 results | 9 May | 7.95 | 14 | 27.3 |
| Semi-final 5 | 10 May | 9.90 | 7 | 36.6 |
| Semi-final 5 results | 10 May | 8.83 | 13 | 30.2 |
| Live final | 12 May | 13.12 | 1 | 46.4 |

== Criticism, controversies & incidents ==
=== Beatrix Von Bourbon audition ===
On 23 April 2012, Ofcom launched an investigation into the programme after receiving complaints from viewers regarding the audition of burlesque performer Beatrix Von Bourbon. The complaints focused on the nature of her performance - which her stripping down until she wore only nipple tassels and a corset - and thus its suitability for a family audience and being aired before the 9pm watershed. The investigation lasted two months, and concluded on 23 July with the regulator ruling that ITV had not breached its broadcasting codes on protecting children from unsuitable material, stating that the broadcaster's measures to censor the footage of the audition had been within acceptable parameters.

=== Ryan O'Shaughnessy audition ===
Researchers for Britain's Got Talent were forced to inform production staff that the participation of Ryan O'Shaughnessy, who auditioned for the sixth series, was heavily controversial due to his failure to disclose information in his application form for the show. Per the programme's terms and conditions, O'Shaughnessy had not disclosed that his involvement would be ineligible, due to him signing a contract with Universal Music and securing a place on the first series of The Voice of Ireland that same year. Although the singer was confronted with this information and stated in his defence that he wished to express his own music, Simon Cowell had to make clear that his involvement on the programme was a direct conflict of interest. O'Shaughnessy was only able to continue his participation after dropping out of The Voice of Ireland and his contract with Universal Music before his semi-final appearance.

=== Voting app mishap ===
Although voting prior to the sixth series had been mainly conducted via phone votes, production staff decided to incorporate a second method of voting for viewers, in the form of a mobile app. The concept was that viewers could use the app to purchase a set of three votes for a small fee and use for any act within the semi-finals - if a viewers used two mobile votes in one semi-final, the third could be used in another, with viewers able to buy more votes after using up their initial set. However, the implementation of this voting method for the first semi-final saw technical difficulties arise, which could not be fixed and led to the app being discontinued for the rest of the series. Ofcom was forced to investigate the incident after viewers complained about the difficulty of making votes with the app. Although the regulator reprimanded ITV for the failures in the operation of the app, it acknowledged that the concept was an original idea and that the broadcaster was not at fault for the technical issues that occurred per the actions taken to deal with the resulting problems.
