= David Walliams bibliography =

List of works written by David Walliams

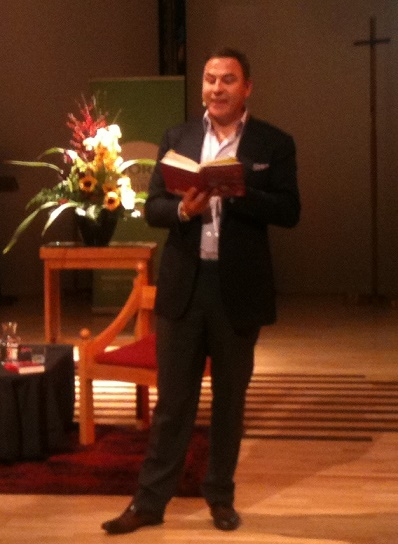
- Walliams at the WORD Christchurch Festival 2015, New Zealand
- Novels↙: 22
- Collections↙: 7
- Picture books↙: 10
- Non-fiction↙: 2
- Short novels↙: 1

David Walliams (born 1971) is a British writer of children's books, having sold more than 50 million copies worldwide.

Walliams began writing children's novels in 2008 after securing a contract with the publisher HarperCollins. His books have been translated into 53 languages, and he has been described as "the fastest-growing children's author in the UK", with a literary style compared to that of Roald Dahl.

Some of his books have been adapted into television films, which he has also appeared in, including Mr Stink (2012), Gangsta Granny (2013), The Boy in the Dress (2014), Billionaire Boy (2016), Ratburger (2017), Grandpa's Great Escape (2018), The Midnight Gang (also 2018) and Gangsta Granny Strikes Again! (2022).

== Novels ==
Walliams' novels
Title	Year of first publication	First edition publisher
The Boy in the Dress	2008	HarperCollins, London
Mr Stink	2009	HarperCollins, London
Billionaire Boy	2010	HarperCollins, London
Gangsta Granny	2011	HarperCollins, London
Ratburger	2012	HarperCollins, London
Demon Dentist	2013	HarperCollins, London
Awful Auntie	2014	HarperCollins, London
Grandpa's Great Escape	2015	HarperCollins, London
The Midnight Gang	2016	HarperCollins, London
Bad Dad	2017	HarperCollins, London
The Ice Monster	2018	HarperCollins, London
FING!	2019	HarperCollins, London
The Beast of Buckingham Palace	2019	HarperCollins, London
Slime	2020	HarperCollins, London
Code Name Bananas	2020	HarperCollins, London
Megamonster	2021	HarperCollins, London
Gangsta Granny Strikes Again!	2021	HarperCollins, London
Spaceboy	2022	HarperCollins, London
Robodog	2023	HarperCollins, London
The Blunders	2023	HarperCollins, London
Astrochimp	2024	HarperCollins, London
Super Sleuth	2024	HarperCollins, London
Santa And Son	2025	HarperCollins, London

== Short story collections ==
Walliams' short story collections
Title	Year of first publication	First edition publisher
The World's Worst Children	2016	HarperCollins, London
The World's Worst Children 2	2017	HarperCollins, London
The World's Worst Children 3	2018	HarperCollins, London
The World's Worst Teachers	2019	HarperCollins, London
The World's Worst Parents	2020	HarperCollins, London
The World's Worst Pets	2022	HarperCollins, London
The World's Worst Monsters	2023	HarperCollins, London

== Picture books ==
Walliams' picture books
Title	Year of first publication	First edition publisher
The Slightly Annoying Elephant	2013	HarperCollins, London
The First Hippo on the Moon	2014	HarperCollins, London
The Queen's Orang-utan	2015	HarperCollins, London
The Bear Who Went Boo!	2015	HarperCollins, London
There's a Snake in My School!	2016	HarperCollins, London
Boogie Bear	2018	HarperCollins, London
Geronimo	2018	HarperCollins, London
The Creature Choir	2019	HarperCollins, London
Little Monsters	2020	HarperCollins, London
Marmalade: The Orange Panda	2022	HarperCollins, London
Grannysaurus	2022	HarperCollins, London
Little Monsters Rule	2023	HarperCollins, London
Bot	2025	HarperCollins, London

== Non-fiction ==
Walliams' works of non-fiction
Title	Year of first publication	First edition publisher	Scope	Notes
Inside Little Britain	2006	Ebury Press, London	Autobiography	With Boyd Hilton and Matt Lucas
Camp David	2012	Michael Joseph, London	Autobiography	

== Short novels ==
Walliams' short novels
Title	Year of first publication	First edition publisher
Blob	2017	HarperCollins, London
