= David Walliams filmography =

This is a list of works and appearances by the English comedian, actor and television personality David Walliams.

== Film ==
Year	Title	Role	Notes	Ref(s)
1995	PJ & Duncan: U Krazy Katz	Sailor		
1997	Clancy's Kitchen	Awards show host		
1997	Dennis Pennis R.I.P.	Anthony Cream Jnr. / Merlin Boast		
1997	Seven Sins: Wrath	Himself		
1998	Fat Les: Vin-da-loo	Crowd member		
1998	Fat Les: Naughty Christmas	Office worker		
1999	Plunkett & Macleane	Viscount Bilston		
2000	The Bluetones: Mudslide	Record producer		
2003	Hello Friend	Friend	Short film	
2003	Coogan's Runner	Himself		
2004	Shaun of the Dead	News reporter	Voice role, uncredited	
2005	A Cock and Bull Story	Parson		
2005	Stoned	Accountant		
2005	Alan Partridge Presents: The Cream of British Comedy	Mr. Thomas		
2006	Marie Antoinette	Hairdresser	Uncredited	
2006	Pet Shop Boys: I'm with Stupid	Himself		
2007	Stardust	Sextus		
2007	Run Fatboy Run	Man in bakery		
2007	The Bluetones: Blue Movies	Record company boss		
2007	Virgin Territory	Cart pusher		
2008	The Chronicles of Narnia: Prince Caspian	Bulgy Bear	Voice role	
2010	Marmaduke	Anton Harrison		
2010	Dinner for Schmucks	Müeller		
2011	The Itch of the Golden Nit	Golden Nit	Voice role	
2012	Great Expectations	Mr. Pumblechook		
2013	Justin and the Knights of Valour	Melquiades and Karolius	Voice role	
2013	The Look of Love	Vicar Edwyn Young		
2014	Pudsey the Dog: The Movie	Pudsey	Voice role	
2017	And the Winner Isn't	Himself		
2019	Missing Link	Mr. Lemuel Lint	Voice role	
2019	Murder Mystery	Tobias Quince		
2021	Twist	Dr. Crispin Losberne		
2021	Rhythm of Life	Himself	Short film	
2023	My Happy Ending	Joey		
2026	Fing!	Headmaster		
TBA	The Liar	Hesketh-Harvey		
TBA	The Land of Sometimes	Guardian of the Electric Volcano	Voice role	

== Television ==
Year	Title	Role	Notes	Ref(s)
1994	Incredible Games	The Lift	14 episodes	
1994	Games World	Lesley, Professor, Mike, Barry	2 episodes	
1996	Mash and Peas	Gareth Peas	9 episodes	
1996	Asylum	Cockney film star	1 episode	
1997	It's Ulrika!	Various roles	Television film	
1998	Alexei Sayle's Merry-Go-Round	Newsagent	1 episode	
1998	Barking	Various roles	6 episodes	
1998	You Are Here	Murray Moffatt	Television film	
1999	Bang, Bang, It's Reeves and Mortimer	Various roles	5 episodes	
1999	Sir Bernard's Stately Homes	Anthony Rodgers	6 episodes	
1999	Coming Soon	Graeme Cunliffe	Television film	
1999	Spaced	Vulva	Episode: "Art"	
1999	The Web of Caves	Chief alien	Television short	
1999	The Pitch of Fear	Sydney Newman	Television short	
1999	The Kidnappers	David	Television short	
1999–2022	Rock Profile	Various roles		
2000	Full Mountie	Tony Rodgers	1 episode	
2000	The Strangerers	Rats	5 episodes	
2000	Attachments	Jake Plaskow	Episode: "Just Upgraded"	
2000	Black Books	Customer	Episode: "He's Leaving Home"	
2001	Fun at the Funeral Parlour	Cobra	Episode: "Dead Aid"	
2001	Baddiel's Syndrome	James Bourne	2 episodes	
2001	High Stakes	Stephen Clay	Episode: "Soulmates"	
2001	World of Pub	Dr. Seuss	Episode: "Drink"	
2001	Randall and Hopkirk (Deceased)	Browning	Episode: "Whatever Possessed You?"	
2002	Ted and Alice	Shane	3 episodes	
2002	Time Gentlemen Please	Marcel	Episode: "Entente Lime Cordial"	
2002	Nice Guy Eddie	Harry Lloyd	1 episode	
2002	The Bill	Ben Fletcher	Episode: "Protection"	
2002	George Eliot: A Scandalous Life	John Chapman	Television film	
2002	Cruise of the Gods	Jeff 'Lurky' Monks	Television film	
2002	Sport Relief	Co-host	One-off special	
2002–2005	Look Around You	Bournemouth / Man with 'The Bum'	2 episodes	
2003	Casualty	Jon Fielding	Episode: "Love Hurts"	
2003	EastEnders	Ray	2 episodes	
2003–2006	Little Britain	Various roles	36 episodes	
2004	Hustle	Dress shop manager	Episode: "Cops and Robbers"	
2004	Monkey Trousers	Various roles	Television film	
2004	French and Saunders	Various roles	1 episode	
2004	Agatha Christie's Marple	George Bartlett	Episode: "The Body in the Library"	
2004	Samantha oups!	Actor		
2005	Waking the Dead	Bell	Episode: "Towers of Silence"	
2007	Hotel Babylon	Adrian Tintagel	1 episode	
2007	Neighbours	Lou Todd	Episode: "British Bulldog"	
2007	Capturing Mary	Greville White	Television film	
2008	Frankie Howerd: Rather You Than Me	Frankie Howerd	Television film	
2008	Little Britain USA	Various roles	6 episodes	
2009–2011	Never Mind the Buzzcocks	Presenter	2 episodes	
2010	The One Ronnie	Various roles	One-off special	
2010–2011	Come Fly with Me	Various roles	6 episodes	
2011	David Walliams' Awfully Good	Presenter	3 episodes	
2011	Wall of Fame	Host	5 episodes	
2011	Doctor Who	Gibbis	Episode: "The God Complex"	
2012	The Royal Bodyguard	Sir Ambrose Hamilton	Episode: "The Royal Art of Blackmail"	
2012	The Greatest Footie Ads Ever	Lou	Television film	
2012	Top Dog Model	Narrator	6 episodes	
2012	Are You Having a Laugh? TV and Disability	Narrator	Television film	
2012	Perspectives	Presenter	Episode: "David Walliams: The Genius of Dahl"	
2012	Mr Stink	Steve the British Prime Minister	Television film	
2012	Room on the Broom	Frog (voice)	Television short	
2012, 2016	Royal Variety Performance	Compère	One-off special	
2012–2022	Britain's Got Talent	Himself, Judge	Series 6-15	
2013	Blandings	Rupert Baxter	2 episodes	
2013	Gangsta Granny	Mike	Television film	
2013–2014	Big School	Mr. Keith Church	12 episodes	
2013–present	Comic Relief	Co-host	One-off special	
2014	The Boy in the Dress	Football Referee	Television film	
2015	Partners in Crime	Tommy Beresford	6 episodes	
2015	The Nation's Favourite Bond Song	Narrator	One-off special	
2015–2016	Walliams & Friend	Himself	7 episodes	
2016	Some Mothers Do 'Ave 'Em	Himself	1 episode	
2016	Royal Variety Performance	Presenter	One-off special	
2016	Billionaire Boy	Mrs. Trafe	Television film	
2016	Blankety Blank	Presenter	1 episode	
2016	Revolting Rhymes	Various roles	Television film	
2016	David Walliams Celebrates Dame Shirley Bassey	Presenter	One-off special	
2017	Jack Whitehall at Large: Intro	Himself	Television short	
2017	The Nightly Show	Presenter	5 episodes	
2017	Ratburger	Burt	Television film	
2017–2018	Teletubbies	Voice Trumpet	Voice role	
2018	Elton John: The Nation's Favourite Song	Presenter	One-off special	
2018	Grandpa's Great Escape	Barry	Television film	
2018	The Queen and I	Jack Barker	Television film	
2018	The Midnight Gang	Headmaster	Television film	
2018	It'll Be Alright on the Night	Narrator	One-off special	
2019	Urban Myths	Monty	Episode: "The Trial of Joan Collins"	
2019	An Evening with Elton John	Himself	One-off special	
2019	Britain's Got Talent: The Champions	Himself, Judge	6 episodes	
2019	Not the Robbie Williams Christmas Show	Gillian Smith	One-off special	
2019	Cinderella: After Ever After	Prince Charming	Christmas special	
2020–2021	Sandylands	Derek Swallows	6 episodes	
2020	25th National Television Awards	Presenter	One-off special	
2020	The Big Night In	Himself, various roles	One-off special	
2020	Jack and the Beanstalk: After Ever After	The Giant	Christmas special	
2021	Chitty Flies Again with David Walliams	Himself	Television film	
2021	Saturday Knight Takeaway	Himself	Television film	
2021	Hansel & Gretel: After Ever After	Troll	Television film	
2021	Quentin Blake: The Drawing of My Life	Himself	Television film	
2022	Australia's Got Talent	Himself, Judge	Season 10	
2022	Gangsta Granny Strikes Again!	Mike	Television film	
2022	Red Riding Hood: After Ever After	Wolf	Television film	

=== Theatre ===
Year	Production	Role	Director	Venue
2005–2007	Little Britain Live	Various characters / wiriter	Jeremy Sams	UK, Ireland and Australian tours
2008	No Man's Land	Foster	Rupert Goold	Gate Theatre; Duke of York's Theatre
2013	A Midsummer Night's Dream	Nick Bottom	Michael Grandage	Noël Coward Theatre
