= Gangsta Granny =

Book by David Walliams

- First edition
- Author: David Walliams
- Illustrator: Tony Ross
- Language: English
- Genre: Children's fiction (8-12)
- Publisher: HarperCollins
- Publication date: 27 October 2011
- Publication place: United Kingdom
- ISBN: 978-0007371440
- Preceded by: Billionaire Boy
- Followed by: Ratburger

Gangsta Granny is a 2011 British children's comedy fiction book written by David Walliams, illustrated by Tony Ross and published by HarperCollins. A sequel, titled Gangsta Granny Strikes Again!, was published in 2021.

In 2026, the book was permanently taken out of print by HarperCollins as part of their announcement to stop selling and reprinting titles by Walliams after a joint Guardian and ITV News investigation into allegations of sexual misconduct involving him.

== Plot ==
Ben, an 11-year old, curious boy, hates having to stay with his old Granny every Friday because his parents go to see a dancing show named Strictly Stars Dancing which is a parody of Strictly Come Dancing. He finds it boring and repetitive as his Granny always feeds him cabbage-related dishes, most commonly cabbage soup and cabbage chocolate. They are constantly playing Scrabble, plus her television has not been working since the 1990s.

Ben loves plumbing and is a long-term subscriber to the magazine Plumbing Weekly, which he buys every week from Raj's newsagent. Ben's parents disapprove of him being a plumber, as their ambition for their only child was to be a professional ballroom dancer like the one they used to watch every Friday. Ben learns that his grandmother had been an international jewel thief, and joins her in a plot to steal the crown jewels.

== Adaptations ==
=== Television film adaptation ===
A 70-minute television film adaptation of Gangsta Granny premiered on BBC One on 26 December 2013. The television film was directed by Matt Lipsey, produced by Jo Sargent, Bert Productions and BBC Comedy Production, executive-produced by Mark Freeland and written by Kevin Cecil, Andy Riley and the book's author David Walliams.

Gangsta Granny starred:

- Reece Buttery as Ben
- Julia Mackenzie as Granny, Mike's mother and Ben's grandmother
- Joanna Lumley as Queen Elizabeth II
- David Walliams as Mike, Ben's father
- Miranda Hart as Linda, Ben's mother
- Rob Brydon as Mr Parker, a neighbour of Ben
- India Amarteifio as Florence
- Robbie Williams as Flavio Flavioli, a dancer on Strictly Come Dancing
- Jocelyn Jee Esien as Kelly, Florence's mother
- Harish Patel as Raj, the newsagent
- George Hill as Terrence, Mr Parker's son and assistant
- Claudia Winkleman as herself
- Leo Wringer as Doctor Long
- Tim Frances as Doctor Edwards
- Russell-Leighton Dixon as Judge
- Steve Speirs as PC McClintock
- Patrick Brennan as Beefeater
- Timothy Bentinck as Chief Inspector
- Max Olesker as Policeman

=== Theatre adaptation ===
The book has also been adapted into a 130-minute theatre performance by the Birmingham Stage Company. It toured the United Kingdom until July 2017. It then became a play at the Garrick Theatre in the West End from 26 July to 3 September 2017.

=== Ride adaptation ===
On 21 March 2020, Alton Towers Resort in Staffordshire, England launched The World of David Walliams, with the main theme of the area being focused on the Gangsta Granny book. The new area features a 4D dark ride titled Gangsta Granny: The Ride, where guests embark on a crown jewels tour, which is then sabotaged by Ben and Granny who persuade the guests to join them on a heist of a lifetime to steal the crown jewels. Gangsta Granny: The Ride opened on 17 May 2021.

On 3 November 2026, the ride is no longer operational, as it was announced that The World of David Walliams themed area had permanently closed.
