= Harish Patel =

Indian actor (born 1953)

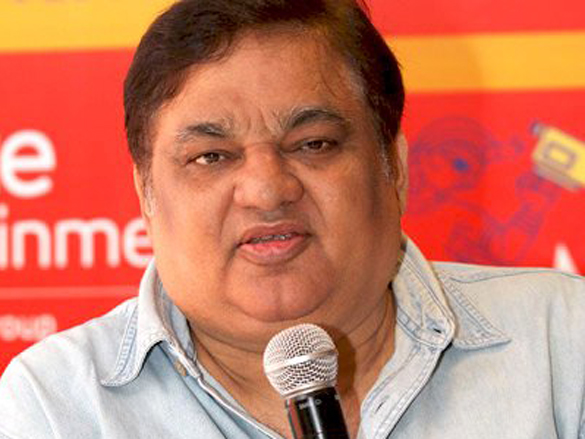
- Patel in 2009
- Born: 5 July 1953 (age 73); Bombay, Bombay State, India
- Occupation: Actor
- Years active: 1967, 1983–present
- Notable credits: Gunda; Eternals; Mr. India; Pratibandh; The Buddha of Suburbia; Mr Stink; Gangsta Granny; The No. 1 Ladies' Detective Agency
- Height: 1.65 m (5 ft 5 in)

Harish Patel (Gujarati: હરીશ પટેલ; born 5 July 1953) is an Indian character actor. He has appeared in a variety of Hindi films, but in recent years has begun to appear in American projects like reimagination of Four Weddings and a Funeral on Hulu and the MCU film Eternals. Although mainly associated with the stage, he has appeared in Indian and British films and television shows.

== Early life and background ==
Patel was born in Mumbai, Bombay State (now Maharashtra), India. He began performing at the age of seven, when he played male and female roles in the Hindu epic Ramayana.

== Acting career ==
He made his film debut in Mandi directed by Shyam Benegal in 1983. From 1994 to 2008, Patel worked with the Indian theatre director Satyadev Dubey. In 1995, he joined the Indian National Theatre and appeared in the play Neela Kamra. His repertoire has included classical and modern Indian plays as well as plays by Western writers, e.g., Pinter's The Caretaker, Sartre's No Exit, Camus' Cross Purpose, Ionesco's The Lesson, and Mrozek's Vatzlav.

In the spring of 2007, Patel took the lead role of Eeshwar Dutt in Rafta, Rafta..., a comedy written by Ayub Khan-Din and directed by Nicholas Hytner at the National Theatre in London to critical acclaim and sellout audiences.

His credits include The Buddha of Suburbia, China Gate, Mr India and Run Fatboy Run. In 2009 he appeared in Coronation Street playing the role of Umed, Dev Alahan's uncle. Patel also appeared in Mr Stink, Gangsta Granny, The Boy in the Dress and Billionaire Boy, the television film adaptations of children's books by David Walliams. He plays shopkeeper Raj in all the films, although they are set in different places.

His acting career has taken him all over India, and he has performed in the United Kingdom and abroad, in the United States and Dubai among other countries. Patel is a life member of the Cine & TV Artists Association of India.

He is well known for his catchphrase "gayee bhains paanee mein" (the buffalo entered the water), in the movie Mr. India. Additionally, he garnered international recognition after starring in Marvel Studios' Eternals as Karun. When interviewed regarding the film, Harish admitted to never watching a Marvel film before or even seeing Angelina Jolie or Salma Hayek films before.

== Filmography ==
=== Film ===
Year	Title	Role	Notes	Ref.
1967	Boond Jo Ban Gayee Moti	Child in classroom	Uncredited role	
1983	Mandi	Policeman		
1984	Utsav	Maitrey		
1985	Vivek			
1985	Aghaat	Laxman / Chotelai brother		
1985	Maa Kasam			
1986	Mirch Masala	Pandit / The priest		
1987	Dacait	Tolaram		
1987	Mr. India	Roopchand	Cameo appearance	
1987	Susman	Venkatesh		
1988	Rihaee	Narrator / Raojibhai		
1988	Qatil	Havaldar Hamid Rashid Khan		
1989	Billoo Badshah	Tikamdas Kundandas Mirchandani		
1989	Maine Pyar Kiya	Rahim chacha		
1990	Ek Number Ka Chor	Policeman		
1990	Police Public	CBI Assistant Ravi		
1990	Pratibandh	Katkar	Credited as Hrsh Patel	
1990	Thanedaar	Hawaldar Bechare		
1991	Ramgarh Ke Sholay	Inspector Himmat Singh		
1991	Izzat	Sultan		
1991	First Love Letter	Bahadur Singh		
1991	Great Target			
1991	Aag Laga Do Sawan Ko			
1992	Shola Aur Shabnam	Velji		
1992	Panaah	Lala Ranchod		
1992	Sarphira	Cop		
1992	Bol Radha Bol	Narag		
1993	Aankhen	Monto		
1993	Gurudev	Inspector		
1993	Sainik	Guddi's father		
1993	15th August	Secretary to Nagpal		
1993	Bedardi	Baburam		
1993	Chahoonga Main Tujhe			
1993	Main Phir Aaoongi			
1994	Andaz	Home Minister	Uncredited role	
1994	Jai Kishen	Putarmal		
1994	Mohra	Kranti Kumar		
1994	Fauj	Anokhe Lal		
1994	Andaz Apna Apna	Sevaram		
1994	Mr. Azaad	Havaldar Khare	Uncredited role	
1994	Ikke Pe Ikka	Bajrangi		
1994	Paramaatma	Munshi		
1994	Yuhi Kabhi	Kapoor		
1995	Aaj Ka Maseeha			
1995	God and Gun	Man at Railway Crossing		
1995	Ravan Raaj: A True Story	Shilpa's Father		
1995	Taaqat			
1995	Barsaat	Damru 'Danny'		
1995	Akele Hum Akele Tum	Amarji		
1995	Ab Insaf Hoga	Bansi		
1995	Vartmaan			
1996	Halo			
1996	Rajkumar			
1996	Tu Chor Main Sipahi	Home Minister		
1996	Mafia	Kalyanji Bhai Matke		
1996	Loafer	Pandit		
1996	Bhishma	Havaldar Ramdas		
1996	Dil Tera Diwana	Laxminarayan		
1996	Kama Sutra: A Tale of Love	Doctor Mani		
1996	Rangbaaz			
1996	Ghatak: Lethal	Katya's Brother-In-Law		
1996	Rakshak	Rokde		
1996	Ram Aur Shyam	Money Lender		
1996	Angaara	Dhaniram Koilewala		
1997	Aar Ya Paar	Gupta		
1997	Ziddi			
1997	Sanam	Balwant Sinha		
1997	My Son the Fanatic	Fizzy		
1997	Do Ankhen Barah Hath	Keshav Bapu Darwaza		
1997	Tarazu	Appa Rao's attorney		
1997	Gupt: The Hidden Truth	Phoolchand		
1997	Udaan	DCP Rawat	Uncredited role	
1997	Loha	Salim Chikna		
1997	Aflatoon	Police Commissioner		
1997	Mrityudand	MLA Durga Pandey		
1997	Suraj	Charandas		
1998	Purani Kabar			
1998	Vinashak - Destroyer	Convict		
1998	Salaakhen	Bhutaneshwar		
1998	Jab Pyaar Kisise Hota Hai	Mr. Sinha (Komal's uncle)		
1998	Pyaar To Hona Hi Tha	Rahul & Sanjana's Boss		
1998	Maut			
1998	Main Solah Baras Ki	Mofatlal		
1998	Gunda	Ibu Hatela		
1998	Jhooth Bole Kauwa Kaate	Dr. Narmada Prasad		
1998	China Gate	Devrug villager		
1999	Daag: The Fire	Bihari		
1999	Kaala Samrajya			
1999	Benaam	Bankhelal		
1999	Maa Kasam			
1999	Dillagi			
2000	Baaghi Aurat			
2000	Mela	Chandulal Popatlal		
2000	Badal	Daya Shanker		
2000	Krodh	Rambhau		
2000	Sabse Bada Be-Imaan			
2000	Dhaai Akshar Prem Ke	Sharan Grewal		
2000	Billa No. 786			
2001	Shola Aur Barood			
2001	Maut Ka Khel			
2001	Zubeidaa	Nandlal Seth		
2001	Pyaar Ishq Aur Mohabbat	Hassubhai		
2001	Master	Superintendent of Police Roshan Lal		
2002	Kuch Tum Kaho Kuch Hum Kahein			
2002	Ghaav: The Wound	Mamaji (Jog's maternal uncle)		
2003	Lady James Bond			
2003	Love at Times Square	Natvar		
2003	Khanjar	Pammi's maternal uncle		
2003	Calcutta Mail			
2003	Bokshu – The Myth			
2004	Mein Bikaaoo: On Sale			
2004	Pati Ho To Aisa			
2004	Thoda Tum Badlo Thoda Hum			
2004	Hatya	Chedulal		
2004	Mirchi: It's Hot	Ilyas Khan		
2004	Nevermind Nirvana	Dr. Arjun Mehta		
2005	Chicken Tikka Masala	Harishbhai Patel		
2005	Pyaar Mein Twist	Raj Loc		
2006	Quarter Life Crisis	Neil's Doctor		
2006	Vidhyaarthi: The Power of Students	Teacher Sharma		
2007	Khallas: The Beginning of End	Chhota Shetty		
2007	Run Fatboy Run	Mr. Goshdashtidar		
2009	Today's Special	Hakim		
2012	All in Good Time	Eeshwar		
2012	Keith Lemon: The Film	Kushvinder		
2013	Jadoo	Raja Chandana		
2017	Lies We Tell	Haji		
2021	Eternals	Karun Patel		
2023	Companion	Amit Oza		
2024	A Nice Indian Boy	Archit Gavaskar		

=== Television ===
Year	Title	Role	Notes
1986	Malgudi Days	Gopinath / Photographer	2 episodes
1986	Hum Hindustani		
1986	Katha Sagar		
1987	Chunni	Ghasita Ram	
1987–1988	Aa Bail Muje Maar		
1988	Wagle Ki Duniya	Joshi	Episode: "Landlord"
1988–1989	Mahanagar		
1988–1989	Bharat Ek Khoj	Lala Makhanlal, Todarmal, Buddhist Monk, Draha, Nai	5 episodes
1990–1991	Agar Aisa Ho To		
1992	Talaash		
1993	The Buddha of Suburbia	Changez	Mini-series, 3 episodes
1994–1995	Tajurbe		
1994–2000	Zara Hatke Zara Bachke		
2000	Noorjahan		
2009	The No. 1 Ladies' Detective Agency	Mr. Patel	3 episodes
2009	Coronation Street	Umed Alahan	42 episodes
2010	Nevermind Nirvana	Dr. Arjun Mattoo	TV film
2011	My Freakin' Family	Pradip	TV film
2012	Mr Stink	Raj	TV film
2013	Gangsta Granny	Raj	TV film
2014	Samvidhaan: The Making of the Constitution of India	M. Ananthasayanam Ayyangar	Mini-series; episode: "Independent India: Righting Fundamental Wrongs with Fundamental Rights"
2014	The Driver	Amjad	3 episodes
2014	Mapp & Lucia	Guru	Episode: "Episode #1.2"
2014	The Boy in the Dress	Raj	TV film
2016	Billionaire Boy	Raj	TV film
2017	Ratburger	Raj	TV film
2018	Grandpa's Great Escape	Raj	TV film
2018	The Midnight Gang	Raj	TV film
2019	Four Weddings and a Funeral	Haroon Khan	Main role, mini-series
2022	Gangsta Granny Strikes Again!	Raj	TV film
