= Fing! =

- American theatrical release poster
- Directed by: Jeffrey Walker
- Screenplay by: David Walliams; Kevin Cecil
- Based on: FING! by David Walliams
- Produced by: Jo Sargent; Todd Fellman; Craig McMahon
- Starring: Mia Wasikowska; Blake Harrison; Taika Waititi; Iona Bell; Penelope Wilton; Richard Roxburgh; Matt Lucas
- Cinematography: Mark Wareham
- Edited by: Geoff Lamb
- Music by: Anne Dudley
- Production companies: King Bert Productions; Story Bridge Films
- Distributed by: Transmission Films (Australia)
- Release dates: January 24, 2026 (Sundance Film Festival); January 14, 2027 (Australia)
- Running time: 96 minutes
- Countries: Australia; United Kingdom
- Language: English

Fing! is a 2026 fantasy adventure film directed by Jeffrey Walker and written by David Walliams and Kevin Cecil. It is based on the 2019 children's book by Walliams.

== Cast ==
- Mia Wasikowska as Mrs. Meek
- Blake Harrison as Mr. Meek
- Taika Waititi as The Viscount
- Iona Bell as Myrtle Meek
- Penelope Wilton as Nanny
- Richard Roxburgh as Mr. Dour
- Robyn Nevin as Chief Librarian
- Matt Lucas as the voice of Fing

== Production ==
In November 2024, an adaptation of Fing by David Walliams was in development, produced by King Bert Productions and Story Bridge Films, with Jeffrey Walker directing, a screenplay by Walliams and Kevin Cecil, and Taika Waititi in talks to star. In March 2025, Taika Waititi, Walliams, newcomer Iona Bell, Mia Wasikowska, Penelope Wilton, Richard Roxburgh, Blake Harrison, and Robyn Nevin joined the cast, as principal photography began at Screen Queensland Studios in Brisbane.

== Release ==
Fing! premiered in the Family Matinee section of the 2026 Sundance Film Festival on January 24, 2026. In May 2026, Angel Studios acquired the rights for distribution in the United States, setting it for release in 2027. The film is scheduled to be released in Australia on January 14, 2027, by Transmission Films. Originally acquired by Sky Cinema for the United Kingdom and Ireland with plans to release it in early 2027, the company dropped the film in November 2026 following sexual harassment allegations against its writer David Walliams. Angel Studios and Transmission Films both announced that in light of the allegations, Walliams' appearance in the film would be removed, as would his credits in the film's promotion and marketing. On 11 November 2026, Stan, the streaming service which co-commissioned the film, removed the title entirely from its content slate. On November 12, a day prior to its international festival premiere, the Doha Film Festival pulled the film from its gala lineup, with refunds being issued to attendees.
