= Awful Auntie =

Book by David Walliams

- First edition
- Author: David Walliams
- Illustrator: Tony Ross
- Language: English
- Genre: Children's fiction
- Publisher: HarperCollins
- Publication date: 26 September 2014
- Publication place: United Kingdom
- Media type: Print (hardcover)
- Pages: 369
- ISBN: 978-0-00745361-0

Awful Auntie is a children's book written by David Walliams and illustrated by Tony Ross. It was the seventh book by Walliams, a television comedian best known as an actor on the show Little Britain, and as a judge on Britain's Got Talent.

This book tells the story of Stella Saxby, the sole heir to Saxby Hall, who is plagued by her awful Aunt Alberta, who will stop at nothing to take her inheritance from her.

The book was discontinued and withdrawn from publication on 18 September 2026, following HarperCollins' decision to drop David Walliams' back catalogue.

== Synopsis ==
The book is set in December 1933. The central character is Stella Saxby, who is a very rich girl. Her parents, Lord and Lady Saxby, have died in a tragic car accident. In the wake of the tragedy, Stella's Aunt Alberta launches a plot to trick Stella out of her inheritance. Also featured are Wagner (Aunt Alberta's enormous owl that was found in a war), Soot (a ghost of a chimney sweep) and Gibbon (the Saxby's elderly butler who offers much comic relief).

Alberta lives up to her moniker as being awful. She lacks all sympathy and morals, having chosen to fight on the German side in World War I simply because she preferred their uniforms. Alberta was determined to have her niece, Stella, sign over the deeds of the house for her own selfish reasons. Alberta also tortures poor Stella in unimaginable ways so she would sign the house deeds.

She has tortured and killed people and loves vicious owls. Stella rightfully fears her, and has to use all her wits to overcome the antagonism. Stella also encounters a ghost named Soot who was her late uncle that she never knew. Soot and Stella become friends and decide to give Alberta a hard time so she would run away.

== Characters ==
=== Main ===
Stella Saxby- The protagonist of the book. The only child of Lord Chester Saxby and his wife, she lost her parents in a car accident she suspected Alberta to be involved in. She befriends the ghost of a chimney sweep, simply called "Soot".

Soot (real name Herbert Saxby)- The ghost of Herbert Saxby, the firstborn son of Stella's grandparents. Herbert went missing soon after his birth and ended up returning to Saxby Hall at the age of 10 as a chimney sweep, but died some time later. As a child, Soot was mistreated by the man who run the workhouse he grew up in and decided to run away after hearing from a gang of boys that he could get food and lodging if he worked as a chimney sweep.

Alberta Saxby- The titular character of the book and Stella's aunt. Growing up, she mistreated her younger brother Chester and gambled the family fortune away by playing Tiddlywinks at casinos. She also is obsessed with owls (having a lot of them stuffed in cases and even entering Wagner in owl-centered competitions and magazines), and wanted to have Saxby Hall burnt down to build an owl museum. She also has a greenhouse filled with deadly plants.

Wagner- The pet owl of Alberta Saxby, that she raised since he was an owlet and named after the German composer of the same name. It is mentioned that he is a "Great Bavarian Mountain Owl" and was adopted by Alberta when she stole the egg that would become Wagner and sat on it until it hatched.

== Reception ==
The book sold over 50,000 copies in a single week after its release, and has been met with high marks from reviewers. In October 2014, four weeks after its publication, Awful Auntie had become the top-selling children's book of the year. In January 2015, the book was confirmed as 2014's best-selling children's book.

Awful Auntie won the Specsavers National Book Awards "Children's Book of the Year" in 2014.

== Theatre adaptation ==
On 30 March 2015, while announcing the Billionaire Boy movie, Walliams also announced a film of Awful Auntie to air during December 2016. However, it did not air and Walliams instead announced it is being developed for a theatrical release.

On 17 March 2017, World of Walliams official page announced a theatre tour of Awful Auntie following the success of the 2016 theatre adaptation of Gangsta Granny. Adapted and directed by Neal Foster, the run started in September 2017 at the Theatre Royal, Glasgow, and finished in January 2019 at the Bloomsbury Theatre, London, and featured Georgina Leonidas as Stella, Timothy Speyer as Aunt Alberta, Ashley Cousins as Soot, and James Endears as Gibbon.

== Board Game ==
Publication of "Cluedo, Awful Auntie Edition," Winning Moves, UK
