= The Boy in the Dress =

The Boy in the Dress may refer to:

- The Boy in the Dress (novel), a 2008 novel by David Walliams
  - The Boy in the Dress (film), a 2014 film based on the novel
  - The Boy in the Dress (musical), a 2019 musical based on the novel
