= Isabella Blake-Thomas =

British actress (born 2002)

- Blake-Thomas in 2026
- Born: Isabella Rose M. Blake-Thomas; 21 September 2002 (age 24); London, England
- Occupation: Actress
- Years active: 2007–present
- Website: isabellablakethomas.com

Isabella Rose M. Blake-Thomas (born 21 September 2002) is an English actress, known for her roles as Princess January in Secret Society of Second-Born Royals, Young Zelena in Once Upon a Time, and Peggy Kendall in Game Shakers.

== Career ==
Blake-Thomas was born in London. Her first role was at the age of five, when she was selected to present the CBeebies television programme Green Balloon Club. This ran for one season between 2008 and 2009. Later in 2009, she had a minor role in the biographical television film Enid, In 2010, she was cast in an adaptation of the Just William series of books, playing Violet-Elizabeth Bott. Blake-Thomas had a role as 'Izzie', in the 2011 film Johnny English Reborn. Her first lead role was in the 2011 independent film Little Glory as Julie, alongside Cameron Bright. In 2012, Blake-Thomas played the part of Annabelle Crumb in the BBC One television film adaptation of the David Walliams book Mr Stink. She also appeared in the DreamWorks animation of Rise of the Guardians.

In 2013, she appeared in Midsomer Murders, Doctor Who and Dancing on the Edge alongside Chiwetel Ejiofor. In 2014, Blake-Thomas appeared in The Smoke on BBC and Da Vinci's Demons. She later appeared in the FX show Married, in 2015. The following year she appeared in Game Shakers, Shameless and ABC's Once Upon a Time as the recurring younger version of Rebecca Mader. In 2017, she re-appeared in Once Upon a Time and continued on as the lead role in Keplers' Dream with Holland Taylor, Kelly Lynch, Sean Patrick Flanery and Steven Michael Quezada. She also starred in The League of Legend Keepers: Shadows and Pretty Outrageous. In 2018 Blake-Thomas appeared in the leading role of Sam in Maybe I'm Fine alongside Kelly Sullivan, Rob Mayes, Flex Alexander and Daniela Alonso. She can be seen as Jon Voight's daughter in Orphan Horse and Pepper in Turnover. She also made her 1st AD debut on the film Running on Empty. In February 2018, Blake-Thomas released her debut single "Blame" which can be found on Spotify, iTunes, Amazon Music and more. Her music video is available for viewing on YouTube starring, Blake-Thomas and Matt Cornett. Blake-Thomas then went on to release two EP's and a remix in 2019. Her debut EP was Stronger and her second was Painless.

In 2017, Isabella Blake-Thomas and her mother, director Elizabeth Blake-Thomas, founded Mother & Daughter Entertainment, their production company whose slogan is "Making content that matters". Since it's creation, the company has produced over 20 feature films of a variety of genres.

== Personal life ==
Blake-Thomas was born in London, England, and was raised by her mother, filmmaker Elizabeth Blake-Thomas. She spent much of her childhood being homeschooled while working as a child actor. In a 2019 interview, Blake-Thomas said that she also attended several schools part-time, including St Wystans and Hampton Court House School, where she studied alongside her acting work. She has described her unconventional education as extending beyond the classroom, with her mother frequently taking her to museums and galleries while they traveled for work.

At the age of ten, Blake-Thomas moved with her mother from London to the United States as her acting career developed. The pair initially lived in the South Bay area of Los Angeles before later settling more permanently in Los Angeles. Blake-Thomas has described the move as an important transition in both her personal life and career, saying that growing up around the entertainment industry gave her greater exposure to filmmaking and production.

Blake-Thomas later attended Santa Monica College, where she earned three associate degrees in psychology, liberal arts and humanities, and social and behavioral sciences. She remained active in the entertainment industry while attending college and has continued to live in Los Angeles while running Mother Daughter Entertainment.

Outside of film and television, Blake-Thomas has spoken about interests including weightlifting, aerial arts and aviation, including flying Cessna aircraft. She has also discussed environmental sustainability and mental health advocacy as areas of personal interest.

== Filmography ==
=== Film ===
Year	Title	Role	Notes	Ref.
2011	Johnny English Reborn	Izzie		
2011	Little Glory	Julie		
2012	Rise of the Guardians	British Girl	Voice	
2013	Let Me Survive	Emily		
2014	We Are Monster	Little Girl		
2014	Scarlett Thread	Scarlett		
2015	Toxin: 700 Days Left on Earth	Young Sarah		
2016	Jean	Jean Sporkin		
2016	The Blimp Trap	Billie Campbell		
2016	Broken Wings	Jemima		
2016	Trust, Prey, Hope	Hope		
2016	Sand Angels	Esperanza		
2017	Clockmaker	Mia		
2017	Community Service	Felicity Tillman		
2017	Kepler's Dream	Ella		
2017	The League of Legend Keepers: Shadows	Sophie		
2017	Pretty Outrageous	Poppy		
2018	Sounds of Silence	Jaime		
2018	Orphan Horse	Young Caroline		
2018	Maybe I'm Fine	Sam		
2018	Running on Empty	1st AD		
2018	Turnover	Pepper		
2019	Evie-Rose	Charlotte		
2019	Unseen	Jenny		
2020	Secret Society of Second-Born Royals	Princess January	Disney+ film	
2021	Just Swipe	Producer	Pluto Original	
2022	Caralique	Caralique	Roku	
2022	Hashtag Blessed	Jessi		
2023	Et Tu	Margaret		
2023	Place of Bones	Lillith		
2024	Murder at Hollow Creek	Isabelle		
2024	Karma: Death at Latigo Springs	Charley		

=== Television ===
Year	Title	Role	Notes	Refs.
2008–09	Green Balloon Club	Lily-Rose	Presenter	
2009	Enid	Girl at Tea Party	TV film	
2010	Just William	Violet-Elizabeth Bott	2 episodes	
2011	Red Faction: Origins	Young Lyra	TV film	
2011	Jelly Jamm	Rita	52-episode series	
2012	Doctors	Ellie Wickens	Episode: "Follow That Star!"	
2012	Mr Stink	Annabelle Crumb	TV film	
2013	Midsomer Murders	Holly	Episode: "Schooled in Murder"	
2013	Dancing on the Edge	Emily	2 episodes	
2013	What's the Big Idea?	Lili	Voice	
2013	Doctor Who	Girl Reading Comic	Episode: "The Bells of St John"	
2013	The White Queen	Little Girl	Episode: "The Storm", uncredited	
2014	The Smoke	Nieve	1 episode	
2014	Da Vinci's Demons	Beatrice	2 episodes	
2014	Work in Progress	Madison Sterling	Episode: "It's a Play Date, Not a Real Date"	
2015	Married	Harper	2 episodes	
2016	Shameless	Pregnant Teenager	Episode: "I Only Miss Her When I'm Breathing"	
2016	Once Upon a Time	Young Zelena	2 episodes	
2016	Game Shakers	Peggy	Episode: "Party Crashers"	
2025	Ha Ha You Clowns	Agatha	2 Episodes	
