= Spoof =

Spoof, spoofs, spoofer, or spoofing may refer to:

- Forgery of goods or documents
- Semen, in Australian slang
- Spoof (game), a guessing game
- Spoofing (finance), a disruptive algorithmic-trading tactic designed to manipulate markets

== Culture ==
- A type of satire, specifically a parody, in which an original work is made fun of by creating a similar but altered work.
- Spoof film (a.k.a. parody film), a cinematographic genre
- Spoofing (anti-piracy measure), a technique to curb unlawful online downloading

== Science and technology ==
- Biometric spoofing, fooling a biometric identification device
- DLL spoofing, using an insecure DLL loading routine to load a malicious DLL file

=== Networking and communications ===
- Protocol spoofing, a technique to increase performance in data communications
- Spoofing attack, the falsifying of data on a telecommunications network
  - ARP spoofing
  - Caller ID spoofing
  - Email spoofing
  - GNSS spoofing, involving navigation satellites
  - IP address spoofing
  - MAC spoofing
  - Referrer spoofing
  - SMS spoofing
  - Spoofed URL
  - Website spoofing

== See also ==
- Meaconing, the interception and rebroadcast of navigation signals
- Replay attack, a network attack in which transmitted data is fraudulently repeated or delayed
