= Aag Laga Do Sawan Ko =

Hindi-language movie

- Directed by: Anup Malik
- Starring: Sargam, Kuldeep Malik, Reema Lagu, Ajit Vachhani, Harish Patel
- Cinematography: Madras
- Music by: Usha Khanna
- Distributed by: Great Shiva International
- Release date: 18 January 1991
- Country: India
- Language: Hindi

Aag Laga Do Sawan Ko (transl. Fire Up The Winter) is 1991 Hindi language movie directed by Anup Malik, starring Harish Patel, Kuldeep Malik, Sargam, Reema and Ajit Vachhani.

== Music ==
The lyrics are written by Anil Khanna.

1. "Ek To Mausam Bada Suhana" – Falguni Seth, Vinod Rathod
2. "Jis Mitti Mein Pyar Nahin" – Uttara Kelkar
3. "Mausam Sard Hai Raat Hai Jawan" – Falguni Seth
4. "Pani O Paani" – Asha Bhosle
5. "Tawaif Hoon Dil Sabka Bahelaungi" – Asha Bhosle
