= Chahoonga Main Tujhe =

Chahoonga Main Tujhe चाहूँगा मैं तुझे
- Promotional poster
- Directed by: Kamal
- Produced by: Asgar Hussain
- Starring: Irfan Kamal; Niloo Kapoor; Kiran Kumar; Kader Khan
- Cinematography: Radhu Karmakar
- Music by: Laxmikant–Pyarelal
- Release date: 1993
- Running time: 135 minutes
- Country: India
- Language: Hindi

Chahoonga Main Tujhe is a 1993 Indian Hindi-language film produced by Asgar Hussain and directed by Kamal, starring Irfan Kamal and Niloo Kapoor with Kiran Kumar and Kader Khan.

== Cast ==
- Irfan Kamal
- Niloo Kapoor
- Kiran Kumar
- Kader Khan
- Harish Patel
- Shafi Inamdar

== Soundtrack ==
1. "Chahunga Main Tujhe Lekin" – Mohammed Aziz
2. "Kar Mujhe Salaam" – Mohammed Aziz
3. "Jao Logon Jao" – Alka Yagnik
4. "Tera Badan Bhi Ek Shola" – Alka Yagnik, Amit Kumar
5. "I Love You I Hate You" – Alka Yagnik, Vinod Rathod
6. "Wah Wah Kare Yeh Sari Duniya" – Sudesh Bhosle, Vinod Rathod
