= Mr Stink =

Book by David Walliams

- Author: David Walliams
- Illustrator: Quentin Blake
- Language: English
- Genre: Children's fiction (8-12)
- Publisher: HarperCollins
- Publication date: 29 October 2009
- Publication place: United Kingdom
- Media type: Print
- Pages: 272 pp
- ISBN: 978-0007279050
- OCLC: 535490682
- LC Class: PZ7.W1593357 Mr 2010

Mr Stink is a children's book written by David Walliams and illustrated by Quentin Blake, first published in the United Kingdom in 2009 by HarperCollins. It was adapted into a 2011 stage musical and a 2012 television film broadcast by the BBC.

On 18 September 2026, it was permanently withdrawn from publication, along with all of David Walliams' older titles, due to allegations of sexual misconduct levied at Walliams.

== Plot ==
Chloe is a lonely 12-year-old girl who is bullied at school. Her mother, Caroline, prefers Chloe's academically successful and extra-curricularly ambitious younger sister, Annabelle, and is highly ambitious and running for parliament. Her father has lost his job but is afraid to tell his wife.

Chloe meets a smelly tramp known as Mr Stink, befriends him and hides him and his filthy dog Duchess in the garden shed. When he is discovered, Caroline, who advocates clearing homeless people off the streets, falsely claims to have invited him to stay with the family. She and Mr Stink appear together on the TV show Question Time, where Mr Stink is a great success with the audience and embarrasses Caroline by revealing the truth about who gave him shelter.

The TV appearance leads to an audience with Steve the British Prime Minister, who makes Mr Stink an offer to which Chloe says, "[S]tick it up your fat bum!". It is later revealed Mr Stink is a Lord who became a tramp after the death of his wife. Mr Stink declines to change his ways and resumes his travels.

== Publication and reception ==
Mr Stink was first published by HarperCollins in October 2009 in hardcover format. A list of notable formats is as follows:

Release date	Publisher	Format	Pages	ISBN
29 October 2009	HarperCollins	Hardcover	272pp	978-0007279050
27 May 2010	HarperCollins	Paperback	224pp	978-0007279067
27 May 2010	HarperCollins	Audio book	CD	978-0007333394
14 October 2010	RazorBill	Paperback	265pp	978-1595143327

Mr Stink was Walliams' second children's book, after The Boy in the Dress, also illustrated by Quentin Blake. It was a best-seller and generally well received. The reviewer in The Daily Express called it "a gentle book with plenty of jokes about bottoms ... and a message about the put upon coming out on top",

In The Guardian, a review of the stage musical called the book "a deliciously improbable romp" while a children's book reviewer called it "a really, really hilarious book, probably one of the best I have read in my life". However, the reviewer for Kirkus Reviews deemed most of the book "trite" and apparently a vehicle for the illustrations and for "a set of typecast characters".

== Adaptations ==
=== Stage musical adaptation ===
A stage musical adaptation of Mr Stink toured the UK in 2011.

=== Television film adaptation ===
A 60-minute television film adaptation of Mr Stink premiered on BBC One on 23 December 2012. The television film was directed by Declan Lowney, produced by Jo Sargent and the BBC, executive-produced by Mark Freeland and written by Simon Nye and the book's author David Walliams.

The main cast for Mr Stink includes Hugh Bonneville as the title character, Pudsey the Dog as the title character's dog Duchess, Nell Tiger Free as Chloe Crumb, Johnny Vegas as Chloe's father, Sheridan Smith as Chloe's mother, Isabella Blake-Thomas as Chloe's sister Anabelle, Walliams as Steve the British Prime Minister, Jemma Donovan as Chloe's nemesis Pippa and Harish Patel as Raj the Indian shopkeeper. It was the BBC's one and only television film to be filmed in stereoscopic 3D.
