= Leo Wringer =

British Shakespearean actor

Leo Wringer is a British Shakespearean actor who has also performed in many television and film roles.

== Early life and education ==
Wringer was born in Spanish Town, Jamaica to Aston Charles Wringer and Cynthia Wringer. The family lived in Tottenham. He was schooled in England. He went to the Guildhall School of Music and Drama. He graduated in 1978 and was awarded the Shakespeare Prize.

== Shakespeare ==
Wringer understudied Paul Rhys as Hamlet and performed in this role at the Globe Theater in Tokyo in 1999. He has performed in over 26 Shakespearean productions playing roles from Puck to Rosencrantz to Brutus to Othello. He occasionally plays these roles with a Jamaican or "broad Caribbean" accent, contrasting the classic characters with more modern-sounding dialogue.

In 2018 he performed in The Fantastic Follies of Mrs Rich, an adaptation by the Royal Shakespeare Company of the 18th-century comedy The Beau Deceived. Daily Mail columnist Quentin Letts suggested that Wringer was miscast as the nobleman and criticized what he called the company's "clunking approach to politically correct casting." The Company responded condemning Letts for his "ugly and prejudiced commentary." Wringer was supported in social media and by colleagues both for that specific performance but also his lengthy and impressive stage CV. Wringer responded with an essay in the Sunday Times headlined "And why shouldn't I play a country squire?" calling Letts' comments "an unforgiveable racial slur against me and my fellow actors of colour."

When asked about the concept of colorblind casting, Wringer replied, "I am on the side of the argument that says colourblind casting is another, albeit a subtle, form of suppression of our dreams and stories... Until more institutions and artistic organisations join in the work, already underway, to put Black talent in positions where they can create their own stories of how we got dislocated from our roots, the emphasis should be instead on colour-conscious casting."

Wringer teaches Shakespeare in Performance at the British American Drama Academy.

== Other credits ==
Wringer won a Time Out Award with Colin McFarlane for Best Actor in Two Horseman in 1994. His television credits include The Moonstone, Silent Witness and Gangsta Granny. His film credits include The Kitchen Toto and Max Loves Alice. He played the role of Marvin Gaye senior in Royal & Derngate theatre's dramatization of Gaye's life, called Soul.

He teaches at the British American Drama Academy's London Theatre Program, working there in the Greek Theatre, London Theatre, and Midsummer in Oxford programs.
