= Mr Stink (film) =

2012 film by Declan Lowney

- Genre: Children's fantasy comedy-drama
- Based on: Mr Stink by David Walliams
- Written by: David Walliams; Simon Nye
- Directed by: Declan Lowney
- Starring: Hugh Bonneville; Pudsey the Dog; Nell Tiger Free; Johnny Vegas; Sheridan Smith; Isabella Blake-Thomas; Harish Patel; David Walliams; Jemma Donovan
- Narrated by: Nell Tiger Free
- Music by: David Arnold; Michael Price
- Country of origin: United Kingdom
- Original language: English

Production
- Executive producer: Mark Freeland
- Producer: Jo Sargent
- Production locations: Hemel Hempstead, Hertfordshire, England, United Kingdom
- Cinematography: Philipp Blaubach
- Editor: Mark Everson
- Running time: 60 minutes
- Production company: BBC

Original release
- Network: BBC One
- Release: 23 December 2012

Mr Stink is a 2012 British 60-minute children's fantasy comedy-drama television film based on the 2009 David Walliams book of the same name. It was directed by Declan Lowney and written by Walliams and Simon Nye and it stars Hugh Bonneville, Pudsey the Dog, Nell Tiger Free, Johnny Vegas, Sheridan Smith, Isabella Blake-Thomas, Harish Patel, Walliams and Jemma Donovan. Mr Stink premiered on BBC One in the United Kingdom on 23 December 2012 and it became the first BBC television film to be filmed in stereoscopic 3D.

== Plot ==
A 12-year-old girl named Chloe Crumb is on the bus on the way to her school in Hemel Hempstead, Hertfordshire, England. Her nemesis Pippa throws a banana skin at a homeless man called Mr. Stink who is sitting on a park bench with his dog Duchess. She goes to apologize to Mr. Stink for Pippa's delinquency and offers him £5; Mr. Stink asks for some sausages for the Duchess. The following morning, she takes some sausages to give them to Mr. Stink. Chloe's mother, Caroline, is a candidate to be the local MP. She rips up the story that Chloe wrote, believing that homeless people should be run out of town. Chloe and Mr. Stink enter a local Starbucks, where everyone runs away due to Mr. Stink's stinky powers. Pippa and her gang enter Starbucks, where Mr. Stink burps on them. Chloe asks Mr. Stink if he would like to stay in her garden shed. Mr. Stink initially refuses, but accepts to stay for the night and then decides to move in permanently.

Chloe discovers her father was in a Heavy Metal band called “The Serpents of Doom” and finds a burned Stratocaster guitar. Chloe finds her father hiding in the closet while getting her coat, who tells her he lost his job the previous month and that Caroline burned his guitar. Chloe promises not to tell her mother about losing his job on the condition he doesn't tell Caroline that someone is living in the shed. While Chloe washes Mr. Stink's coat, her younger sister, Annabelle, catches Chloe doing it and reports it to their mother, who sends Chloe's father to check out the shed; he says no one is there, deciding he won't tell since Chloe didn't tell. During Caroline's interview, Mr. Stink bursts into anger over the washed coat, becoming an Internet sensation and leaves. Caroline is invited on Politics Tonight, which is a Question Time-esque show, but Caroline has one condition, and that is Mr. Stink must appear too, forcing them to search for Mr. Stink. Chloe finds Mr. Stink in Starbucks and reconciles with him.

On Politics Tonight, Caroline lies, saying that she invited Mr. Stink, but Mr. Stink tells the truth, that it was Chloe who invited him into their home. When a candidate from a rival party says he would invite Mr. Stink into his garden shed, Caroline bursts out and is subsequently disgraced and forced by the Prime Minister to withdraw her campaign. While Chloe's father admits losing his job to Caroline. Mr. Stink and Chloe go to 10 Downing Street and meet the Prime Minister, who is mean to Mr. Stink. Chloe tells him "to stick his job offer up his fat bum."

Mr. Stink then tells Chloe his story, telling her that he was once a rich man named Lord Darlington. He had a wife called Agatha. She became pregnant, but when she was eight months pregnant, Mr. Stink went to a party, leaving his wife at home and when he got back, the house was ablaze. Agatha died and Mr. Stink, who couldn't bear living in the house any more, walked and never came back. Mr. Stink tells Chloe she can't come with him, though Chloe insists and Mr. Stink decides to talk with her mother. As Chloe packs her bags, her mother arrives crying, pleading with Chloe not to leave. Chloe eventually reconciles with Caroline, who later gives Chloe back the ripped up story and gives Chloe's father a new guitar. While Chloe's father plays the guitar, Mr. Stink leaves. Chloe runs after him, where he tells her he has decided to wander on. He gives Chloe a present and says goodbye to Chloe. Chloe starts writing her journey with Mr. Stink, which starts by "Mr. Stink stank. He also stunk. He was the stinkiest stinker who ever lived."

== Cast ==
- Hugh Bonneville as Mr. Stink, a homeless man with stinky powers
- Pudsey the Dog as Duchess, Mr. Stink’s dog
- Nell Tiger Free as Chloe Crumb, a 12-year-old girl who befriends Mr. Stink
- Johnny Vegas as Mr. Crumb, Chloe’s father who is a former rock star in a band called “The Serpents of Doom”
- Sheridan Smith as Mrs. Caroline Crumb, Chloe’s mother who is a politician
- Isabella Blake-Thomas as Anabelle Crumb, Chloe’s younger sister
- Harish Patel as Raj, the Indian-born shopkeeper of the local newsagents
- David Walliams as Steve the British Prime Minister
- Jemma Donovan as Pippa, Chloe’s school nemesis
- Catherine Freeland as one of Pippa's three gang sidekicks
- Charlotte Timmons as one of Pippa's three gang sidekicks
- Thea Elmsley as one of Pippa's three gang sidekicks
- Golda Rosheuvel as a local Starbucks coffee shop server
- Alex Macqueen as a news reporter
- Steve Pemberton as Sir Derek Dimble
- John Warnaby as a male politician
- Di Botcher as a woman with a question
- Cesare Taurasi as a journalist of The Sun
- Danny Lee Wynter as Steve the British Prime Minister's aide
- Stephen Hawke as a television cameraman
