= Billionaire Boy =

Children's novel by David Walliams

- First edition
- Author: David Walliams
- Illustrator: Tony Ross
- Language: English
- Genre: Children's fiction (8-12)
- Publisher: HarperCollins Children's
- Publication date: 28 October 2010
- Publication place: United Kingdom
- Media type: Print & Film
- Pages: 288 pp
- ISBN: 978-0-00-737104-4

Billionaire Boy is a 2010 British children's fiction book written by David Walliams and illustrated by Tony Ross. It was published on 28 October 2010 by HarperCollins. The story follows Joe Spud, who is the richest boy in the country and has everything he could ever want, but wishes to have a friend and learns a lesson on what it's like to be a normal boy.

The book was adapted for BBC Television, broadcast on 1 January 2016. It was permanently withdrawn from publication on 18 September 2026, as part of HarperCollins' announcement to stop selling and reprinting titles by David Walliams.

== Plot ==
The story is about a 12-year-old billionaire, Joe Spud, who lives with his billionaire dad, who made money out of revolutionary Bumfresh toilet paper. The Spuds live in a very large country home with a large plot of land. The two of them have everything they could ever want, such as an orang-utan butler, a bowling alley, a cinema, and servants. Nevertheless, Joe is depressed and unhappy when he doesn't have any friends. He leaves a wealthy children's school to join a local comprehensive. There he meets 12-year-old, Bob, with whom he becomes friends.

After the cross-country run (where Bob and Joe come last and second to last, respectively), the two go to Raj's store, where Raj reveals Joe's secret. Bob is angry at Joe for not telling him but eventually he accepts it. Then they encounter Dave and Sue Grubb, two bullies whose main target is always Bob. The Grubbs dump Bob in the bin.

Joe then discovers that Bob's father died and offers the £50 note that he had offered him to come last in the race. Bob refuses, however. Joe later pays the Grubbs to not bully Bob without Bob knowing.

Later that day, in History class with Miss Spite (or The Witch) Joe realizes he has forgotten his History homework, and Miss Spite gives him 15 minutes to retrieve it, and Joe calls his father. Len Spud arrives in a Bum Air helicopter, unveiling Joe's secret to the entire school. Joe is chased by everyone, all wanting money from him, and ultimately arrives to Miss Spite five seconds late, and she puts him on litter duty; Joe tries to explain, but Miss Spite does not listen and puts him on litter duty for a month.

During his litter duty where Bob helps him, the Grubbs arrive to reveal Joe's money deal with them. Bob, angered, calls Joe a spoiled brat and leaves, ending their friendship.

After the half-term holidays, a new girl, Lauren, arrives at the school and all the boys have their eye on her, even Joe. Soon Joe and Lauren become best friends. Bob comes along to warn Joe that Lauren is a fake but Joe, suspecting that Bob was jealous of her, responds that he has no friends and felt sorry for him. Bob is enraged and ends his friendship with Joe for good, not before slapping the wad of £50 notes Joe tries to offer and states that he is the one people should feel sorry for.

Joe comes home one day and finds out that his Dad is holding a massive party. Sapphire (his Dad's horrid new girlfriend) blurts out that she had seen Lauren on television before. Soon enough, Joe found out that his dad had paid Lauren to be his friend, he then angrily blames his dad and his wealth for ruining his life, and decides to run away.

Raj, the kindly newsagent, finds Joe sleeping in a skip and talks over with Joe about his situation. Joe goes to Bob's home to apologize. Bob accepts but they soon find out on TV that Mr Spud had lost his fortune as everyone is suing him because Bumfresh is making everyone's bottom go purple. Joe returns to Bumfresh Towers, and his father suggests that he should save something from the house before the bailiffs take everything.

Mr Spud is surprised when Joe returns with a rocket made out of loo roll that he made before they became billionaires, because he says it was "made with love". Later, Joe's father marries Bob's mum so Joe and Bob become step-brothers and the story concludes.

== Characters ==
Joe Spud: The main character in the story. He is the son of a multi-billionaire. His best friend is Bob and his love interest is Lauren, who is revealed to be an actress. Joe is twelve years old at the beginning of the book. He was bullied at his last school because his father made his fortune by making loo rolls, he is very socially awkward.

Leonard Spud: The multi-billionaire who is the founder of Bumfresh. He is divorced and is 46 years old when he says that he and Sapphire have a 27-year age gap. He endlessly dates Page 3 type girls. In the end, he marries Bob's mum.

Bob: Joe's best friend and later stepbrother. His dad died of cancer and his family is poor. The Grubbs bully him and is made fun of by the rest of the class for being fat. He weighs twelve stones and weighed eight stones when he was a baby. He is Raj's favourite customer. He is nicknamed Blob by his classmates and the Grubbs.

Sapphire Stone: A Page 3 girl and a gold digger. It is revealed that she was only dating Mr. Spud because of his wealth. She later dated the entirety of a Premier League football team. She is 19 years old and has blonde hair. She is not very intelligent.

Lauren: An actress. Mr Spud has paid Lauren to be Joe's girlfriend. She stars in the Pot Noodle advert. She is 13 years old and has a boyfriend whose name is not mentioned. She is Joe's love interest and is remarkably pretty.

The Grubbs: The Grubbs are twins who are the school bullies. One of them is Dave and another is Sue, even though they have all the same features. Their parents can't tell them apart and they are sent to a boot camp in America for juvenile delinquents.

Raj: Raj is a very kind shopkeeper who is on occasion rather bizarre and sells newspapers, magazines and chocolates .

Miss Spite: Joe's strict teacher. When Joe gets litter duty, Len Spud (his dad) gets Miss Spite sacked.

Mrs Trafe: The disgusting Lunch lady who enjoys the company of Joe, Bob and Lauren, but not anyone else, and deliberately cooks disgusting food, like deep-fried Blu-Tack. She takes plastic surgery to look young again after Joe lends her money to 'fix' her limping posture.

== Reception ==
Billionaire Boy received positive praise from reviews by newspapers such as The Guardian and The Express. The story has mainly been described as hilarious yet touching, as have Walliams' other books.

== Adaptations ==
=== Television film adaptation ===
After the success of the TV film adaptations of Mr Stink and Gangsta Granny, Walliams announced that The Boy in the Dress and Billionaire Boy would be made into television films.

The adaptation aired on New Year's Day 2016 at 7pm on BBC One. It was seen by 6.34 million viewers, making it the 17th most watched programme on BBC One for the week ending 3 January 2016 and the 21st most watched across all UK TV channels.

The cast for the adaptation is as follows:

- David Walliams as Mrs Trafe
- John Thomson as Len Spud
- James Fleet as Mr Darrow
- Rebecca Front as Mrs Sharpe
- Anthony O'Donnell as Mr Bruise
- Warwick Davis as himself
- Bryn Terfel as himself
- Elliot Sprakes as Joe Spud
- Nathan Waight as Bob
- Catherine Tate as Sapphire Diamond
- Harish Patel as Raj
- Tupele Dorgu as Julie
- Connie Campbell as Maddie

=== Stage musical adaptation ===
A stage musical adaptation, based on the book, premiered lyrics by Miranda Cooper with songwriting partner Nick Coler.
