= India Amarteifio =

English actress (born 2001)

- Amarteifio at the 2026 Toronto International Film Festival.
- Born: 17 September 2001 (age 24); Kingston upon Thames, England
- Occupation: Actress
- Years active: 2013–present

India Ria Amarteifio (born 17 September 2001) is an English actress. She began her career as a child actress on the West End and in the Disney Channel series Evermoor (2015–2017). She gained prominence starring in the title role of the Netflix period drama Queen Charlotte: A Bridgerton Story (2023), winning a NAACP Image Award.

== Early life ==
Amarteifio was born in Kingston upon Thames on 17 September 2001 and brought up with her sister in Twickenham by a single mother, who had moved to London to pursue art before becoming a beautician "to make ends meet". She is of Ghanaian and German ancestry. Amarteifio joined the Richmond Academy of Dance in 2012, through which she auditioned for and earned a scholarship to attend the Sylvia Young Theatre School.

== Career ==
Initially credited as India Ria Amarteifio, she made her West End debut as young Nala in The Lion King at the Lyceum Theatre in 2011. She then appeared in Matilda the Musical at the Cambridge Theatre as Hortensia. Amarteifio was in the 2013 original cast of Charlie and the Chocolate Factory at the Theatre Royal, Drury Lane in the alternating role of Violet Beauregarde. That same year, she made her television debut in the BBC One film Gangsta Granny.

In 2015, Amarteifio appeared in the miniseries The Interceptor and guest starred in the Doctor Who series 9 episode "The Magician's Apprentice", both on BBC One, and began starring in the Disney Channel series The Evermoor Chronicles (also known as just Evermoor in some countries) as Lacie Fairburn, a role she would play for both series. She went on to have recurring roles as Roz Huntley's (Thandiwe Newton) daughter Sophie in the fourth series of Line of Duty and Maya Roebuck in the third series of the Sky Atlantic and Canal+ crime drama The Tunnel.

Amarteifio made her feature film debut in the 2019 comedy-drama Military Wives. In 2022, she played Nora Randall in the Sky Max science fiction series The Midwich Cuckoos. The following year, she starred in the leading role of a young version of Golda Rosheuvel's titular character in the Netflix period drama prequel Queen Charlotte: A Bridgerton Story. For her acting performance she was nominated at the NAACP Image Awards and Astra TV Awards. She appeared on the 2023 Variety list of 10 Brits to Watch and was named a Bright Young Thing by Tatler.

Amarteifio appears in the BBC drama series The Rapture, an adaptation of Liz Jensen’s bestselling novel, in which she plays Bethany Krall. The series premiered on 26 July 2026 on BBC One.

== Personal life ==
Amarteifio supported the Gaza, You'll Never Walk Alone charity initiative in 2024 and signed the Artists for Palestine letter to the BBC condemning "censorship of Palestine" after the documentary Gaza: How to Survive a Warzone (2025) was pulled.

In response to the April 2025 Supreme Court ruling on the definition of woman in the Equality Act and subsequent Equality and Human Rights Commission guidance, Amarteifio was one of over 400 film and television professionals to sign an open letter pledging "solidarity with the trans, non-binary and intersex communities" and condemning both actions.

== Filmography ==
=== Film ===
Year	Title	Role	Notes
2013	Gangsta Granny	Florence	
2019	Military Wives	Frankie	
2024	Early Twenties	Tash	Short film
2026	Clarissa	Young Clarissa	

=== Television ===
Year	Title	Role	Notes
2015	The Interceptor	Hannah / Chloe	TV Series, 7 Episodes
2015	Doctor Who	Alison	Season 9, Episode 1: "The Magician's Apprentice"
2015	Hank Zipzer	Simone Green	Season 2, Episode 7: "Ballot Box Blunder"
2015	Fungus the Bogeyman	Ella	TV Series, 3 Episodes
2015–2017	The Evermoor Chronicles	Lacie Fairburn	TV Series
2017	Line of Duty	Sophie Huntley	TV Series, 3 Episodes
2017–2018	The Tunnel	Maya Roebuck	TV Series, (Season 3)
2018	Unforgotten	Kaz	Season 3, Episode 1
2019	Sex Education	Lizzie Peach	Season 1, Episode 7
2022	The Midwich Cuckoos	Nora Randall	TV Series
2023	Queen Charlotte: A Bridgerton Story	Young Queen Charlotte	Miniseries
2026	The Rapture	Bethany Krall	TV Series

=== Music videos ===
Year	Title	Artist(s)	Ref.
2023	Mosquito	PinkPantheress	
2024	End Game	Cat Burns	

== Stage ==
Year	Title	Role	Notes
2009	Snow White and the Seven Dwarfs	Dancer	Richmond Theatre
2011–2012	The Lion King	Young Nala	Lyceum Theatre, London
2012–2013	Matilda the Musical	Hortensia	Cambridge Theatre, London
2013	Charlie and the Chocolate Factory	Violet Beauregarde	Theatre Royal, Drury Lane
