= The Midnight Gang =

2017 children's book written by David Walliams and illustrated by Tony Ross

- Author: David Walliams
- Illustrator: Tony Ross
- Language: English
- Genre: Children's fiction
- Publisher: HarperCollins
- Publication date: 3 November 2016
- Publication place: United Kingdom
- ISBN: 978-0-00-848759-1
- Preceded by: Grandpa's Great Escape
- Followed by: Bad Dad

The Midnight Gang is a children's book written by David Walliams and illustrated by Tony Ross. It was released by HarperCollins on 3 November 2016. The story follows a boy called Thomas "Tom" Charper going to a cruel hospital and joining a "midnight gang" consisting of the facility's other children and staff.

The book was discontinued and withdrawn on 18 September 2026 due to allegations against David Walliams and HarperCollins' decision to drop him entirely.

== Reception ==
Emily Bearn wrote in The Daily Telegraph, "it is a simple and touching story of children overcoming adversity with make-believe". Common Sense Media's Mary Eisenhart said, "British author David Walliams is in top form with this imaginative, poignant, often crude, and frequently hilarious tale of kids stuck in a London hospital. ... it's a heartstring-tugging, thought-provoking tale with unforgettable characters, relatable issues, and a determination to do better than the bad people in your life."

In a positive review for the School Library Journal, Caitlin Augusta stated, "Ross's numerous black-and-white illustrations mirror Walliams's lawless, uncontained revelry. ... Irreverent as Roald Dahl, Walliams is a unique author who's created a memorable world and cast of characters." In a mixed review, Kirkus Reviews said, "An entertaining tale that will definitely find an audience, but fans of icky, vicious comedy deserve better."

== Adaptations ==
The book was adapted for the theatre, and also for television, in 2018.
