= Gangsta Granny (film) =

2013 television film directed by Matt Lipsey

- Genre: Comedy; Drama
- Based on: Gangsta Granny by David Walliams
- Written by: Kevin Cecil; Andy Riley; David Walliams
- Directed by: Matt Lipsey
- Starring: Julia McKenzie; Reece Buttery; Miranda Hart; David Walliams; Rob Brydon; Robbie Williams; Joanna Lumley
- Theme music composer: David Arnold; Michael Price
- Country of origin: United Kingdom
- Original language: English

Production
- Producer: Jo Sargent
- Cinematography: Tim Palmer
- Editor: Joe Randall-Cutler
- Running time: 70 minutes
- Production companies: Bert Productions; BBC Comedy Production

Original release
- Network: BBC One
- Release: 26 December 2013

Related
- Gangsta Granny Strikes Again!

Gangsta Granny is a British crime comedy television film based on David Walliams' 2011 children's comedy fiction book of the same name. The adaptation is by Kevin Cecil and Andy Riley. The first broadcast was on BBC One on 26 December 2013 at 6.05 PM. A sequel was released in December 2022, with an almost entirely different cast.

== Plot ==
Ben (Reece Buttery), who is 11 years old and lives in Basildon, visits his paternal grandmother's (Julia McKenzie) house every Friday afternoon while his parents go out dancing. Granny has an obsession with meals made from cabbage. Ben initially finds her boring, until he comes across a large box of jewellery while looking for a biscuit. Granny reveals that she was once an international jewel thief, known as the "Black Cat", involved in many high-profile heists during her youth, but she tells Ben that she was never able to steal the Crown Jewels, kept in the Tower of London. This prompts Ben, who has a passion for plumbing, to devise a plan to raid the Tower. Granny agrees to go along with his plans.

At the same time, Ben's parents Mike (David Walliams) and Linda (Miranda Hart), who are dance fanatics and aware of Ben's passion for plumbing, are encouraged by his lie that the noises they heard when he returned home through his bedroom window (after sneaking out to see Granny) was actually him dancing, so decide to enter him into a ballroom dancing competition as a partner to Florence (India Ria Amarteifio). Granny's local neighbours, Mr Parker (Rob Brydon) and his son (George Hill), watch over Ben's movements to and from Granny's house and suspect that the duo are up to no good.

Granny suffers a fall and is found to be terminally ill. Ben helps her escape from the hospital and the plan for the heist continues. On the day of the heist, he forgets the competition and, not having practised once with Florence, who condemns him to dance alone at the last minute, Ben embarrasses himself on the dance floor and earns 0 points. Florence's mother Kelly (Jocelyn Jee Esien), enraged that Ben ruined the contest for her daughter, throws a shoe which hits Flavio (Robbie Williams) and knocks him out. Linda revives him with the kiss of life, after which a mob forms, chasing Ben and his family.

Following the ordeal, Ben returns to his grandmother's house to continue with the heist. After Mr Parker fails to thwart the heist by tipping off a policeman (Steve Speirs), Ben and Granny are escorted by the police to the Tower. They gain access to the White Tower in which the Crown Jewels are kept through the complex's sewerage system and a diversion which unsettles the patrols of the Tower's Yeoman Warders. Once inside the White Tower, the duo is met by Queen Elizabeth II (played by Joanna Lumley), who pardons them, in keeping with tradition, as the last person to attempt to steal the Crown Jewels was also pardoned. In front of the Queen, Granny claims that the jewellery in her box are plastic replicas Mike used to play with and that she had made up the story when she had realised how boring Ben thought she was. Ben and Granny are later met by the police, but they are let off the hook after Granny points out that they do not have the Crown Jewels with them. Back at Granny's house, she admits to Ben that she is dying.

After Granny dies, her jewellery box is donated to charity. Ben talks to Mike and mentions the jewels, which Mike has no memory of despite Granny's claim. Ben reads at his local newsagent's that the jewels were worth millions, meaning that Granny really was a thief. Granny's legacy is remembered at Christmas, when the Queen delivers a message saying that young people should be more caring towards the elderly, in which she indirectly mentions her meeting with Ben and Granny in the Tower of London, before unexpectedly performing a dance, leaving Ben and his parents stunned.

== Cast ==
- Reece Buttery as Ben
- Julia Mackenzie as Granny, Mike's mother and Ben's grandmother
- Joanna Lumley as Queen Elizabeth II
- David Walliams as Mike, Ben's father
- Miranda Hart as Linda, Ben's mother
- Rob Brydon as Mr Parker, a neighbour of Ben
- India Amarteifio as Florence
- Robbie Williams as Flavio Flavioli, a dancer on Strictly Come Dancing
- Jocelyn Jee Esien as Kelly, Florence's mother
- Harish Patel as Raj, the newsagent
- George Hill as Terrence, Mr Parker's son and assistant
- Claudia Winkleman as herself
- Leo Wringer as Doctor Long
- Tim Frances as Doctor Edwards
- Russell-Leighton Dixon as Judge
- Steve Speirs as PC McClintock
- Patrick Brennan as Beefeater
- Timothy Bentinck as Chief Inspector
- Max Olesker as Policeman

== Production ==
On 26 April 2013, the BBC announced that it had commissioned the adaptation for BBC One. It was commissioned by Danny Cohen, controller of BBC One, and Shane Allen, controller of comedy commissioning. Allen said, "The story delivers on David’s penchant for being outrageously funny, yet poignant and tender as well. This will be a wonderful family viewing treat for this Christmas and we’re thrilled about seeing it make the journey from page to screen."

Gangsta Granny began filming on 28 October 2013. David Walliams said: "I am thrilled that we have such a stellar cast of comedy legends for Gangsta Granny. I can only apologise that I am in it too!" Mark Freeland, the controller of BBC comedy production for the BBC, said: "David asked us not to muck up his massively popular book on TV. So we cast him and then added some of the most-loved and wonderful comedy actors in the country. I hope it will be a very special Special."
