= Perspectives (TV series) =

British TV series (2011–2016)

- Genre: Documentary series
- Country of origin: United Kingdom
- Original language: English
- No. of series: 6
- No. of episodes: 29

Production
- Running time: 60 minutes (including adverts)
- Production company: (see below)

Original release
- Network: ITV
- Release: 24 April 2011 – 18 October 2016

Perspectives is a British television arts documentary series for ITV. The show began airing on 24 April 2011 and aired its fifth series in 2015.

== Format ==
Each hour long programme saw well-known celebrities (including Ian McKellen, David Walliams, Sheila Hancock and Paul O'Grady) travel to various parts of the world to explore more about a person who has inspired them. Some subjects were books, such as Griff Rhys Jones, whose chosen subject was the novel The Wind in the Willows.

== Episodes ==
=== Series 1 ===
The first series of the show was announced on 31 March 2011 and began airing on 24 April 2011, starting with "Ian McKellen: Looking for Lowry".

Episode	Airdate	Presenter	Title
1	24 April 2011	Ian McKellen	"Looking for Lowry"
2	1 May 2011	Andrew Lloyd Webber	"A Passion for the Pre-Raphaelites"
3	8 May 2011	Robson Green	"The Pitmen Painters"
4	15 May 2011	Hugh Laurie	"Down by the River"

=== Series 2 ===
Episode	Airdate	Presenter	Title
1	25 March 2012	David Suchet	"People I Have Shot"
2	1 April 2012	Lenny Henry	"Finding Shakespeare"
3	8 April 2012	John Sergeant	"Sergeant on Spike"
4	22 April 2012	David Walliams	"The Genius of Dahl"
5	29 April 2012	Griff Rhys Jones	"Wind in the Willows"

=== Series 3 ===
Episode	Airdate	Presenter	Title	Production company
1	17 March 2013	David Suchet	"The Mystery of Agatha Christie"	Testimony Films
2	24 March 2013	Warwick Davis	"The Seven Dwarfs of Auschwitz"	Chameleon Television
3	31 March 2013	Sheila Hancock	"The Brilliant Brontë Sisters"	Blakeway North
4	7 April 2013	Michael Portillo	"Portillo on Picasso"	Plum Pictures
5	14 April 2013	Paul O'Grady	"Gypsy Rose Lee - The Queen of Burlesque"	Olga TV
6	21 April 2013	Jonathan Ross	"Alfred Hitchcock - Made in Britain"	Hot Sauce TV
7	5 May 2013	Hugh Laurie	"Copper Bottom Blues"	Plum Pictures

=== Series 4 ===
A fourth series of Perspectives was announced on 13 February 2014 and began airing on 20 April 2014, starting with "Alan Davies: The Magic of Houdini".

Episode	Airdate	Presenter	Title	Production company
1	20 April 2014	Alan Davies	"The Magic of Houdini"	What Larks!
2	27 April 2014	Gary Kemp	"Kick Out the Jams"	Snapper TV
3	4 May 2014	Will Young	"The Man in the Hat: Rene Magritte with Will Young"	Blakeway North
4	11 May 2014	Emeli Sande	"Emeli Sande on Frida Kahlo"	Blakeway North
5	18 May 2014	Alfie Boe	"Freddie Mercury Saved My Life"	Brook Lapping
6	25 May 2014	Bruce Forsyth	"Bruce Forsyth on Sammy Davis Junior"	Rain Media Entertainment

=== Series 5 ===
A fifth series of Perspectives began airing on 19 April 2015, starting with: "Michael Jackson's Thriller with Ashley Banjo".

Episode	Airdate	Presenter	Title	Production company
1	19 April 2015	Ashley Banjo	"Michael Jackson's Thriller"	Blakeway North
2	26 April 2015	Len Goodman	"For the Love of Fred Astaire"	Potato
3	3 May 2015	Rick Wakeman	"Vivaldi's Four Seasons"	The Interesting Film Company
4	10 May 2015	Terry Jones	"In Charlie Chaplin's Footsteps"	Wild Pictures
5	17 May 2015	Nicky Campbell	"The Great American Love Song"	Wingspan Productions
6	24 May 2015	Eddie Redmayne	"War Art"	Foxtrot Films

=== Series 6 ===
Series 6 began airing on 18 October 2016.

Episode	Airdate	Presenter	Title	Production company
1	18 October 2016	David Harewood	"In the Shadow of Mary Seacole"	Potato
