= Ratburger =

Book by David Walliams

- First edition
- Author: David Walliams
- Illustrator: Tony Ross
- Language: English
- Genre: Fiction
- Published: 2012
- Publisher: HarperCollins
- Pages: 316
- ISBN: 9780007453535
- OCLC: 811079064

Ratburger is a children's book written by David Walliams and illustrated by Tony Ross. The fifth book by Walliams, it won the Children's Book of the Year Award at the Specsavers National Book Awards in 2012. The book was permanently withdrawn from publication in September 2026 due to sexual misconduct allegations against Walliams.

== Plot ==
Zoe is a young girl whose mother died when she was a baby. Her father lost his job at an ice cream factory, and he and Zoe now live in a council flat with her large stepmother, Sheila, living off scant benefit money from the government. Zoe's father spends much of his time at a local pub, depressed after losing his job. Sheila loves prawn cocktail crisps and cigarettes, and is so lazy that she asks Zoe to pick her nose for her. Zoe is bullied daily by a classmate named Tina Trotts.

A couple of years prior, Zoe's father bought Zoe a hamster as a birthday present, and she named it Gingernut. Once Sheila moved in, she wanted the hamster out. Zoe taught it tricks and had ambitions to be a famous animal trainer, but the hamster dies in suspicious circumstances. Several months later, Zoe finds a baby rat that has sneaked into her room. She discovers that it is intelligent and can dance to music.

Zoe teaches the rat tricks, as she had done with Gingernut. She decides not to keep it at home, as Sheila hates rodents and would probably kill it. Zoe names the rat Armitage, after the name of a plumbing company which she finds on a toilet bowl, and hides it in her blazer, but he is seen by her headmaster and her history teacher Miss Midge, who insists that Zoe should be suspended, as the children are not allowed to bring pets into school.

Zoe goes to see Raj, the owner of her local newsagents, and tells him everything. Raj is shocked to learn of Zoe's suspension and is scared of Armitage, advising Zoe to set him free. Zoe does so, but Armitage comes back, convincing her that he wants to live with her.

Sheila learns of Zoe's suspension and tries to force her to give Armitage to the blind burger seller Burt, who is pretending to be a pest-control man. Zoe denies having a rat, but Burt sniffs him out, and Zoe is locked in her room. She tries to escape by digging a hole through the wall into the neighbouring flat, but this leads to Tina Trott's bedroom.

Escaping from Tina, Zoe follows and spies on Burt, discovering that his burgers are made out of rats he has captured, and his ketchup is made from cockroaches. Burt sniffs her out and eventually tells her why he hates rats: when he worked at a laboratory, he was bitten by a rat which made him jerk his hand upwards and spill acid onto his eyes, burning them out. Because of this, he has a highly acute sense of smell. He tries to run her over and make her into a burger, but Zoe escapes.

Zoe needs help, so she goes to find her father in his local pub, The Executioner & Axe. He accompanies her to the warehouse where Burt keeps his rats and burger-making machine. Since they cannot tell which of the captive rats is Armitage, they decide to free all of them. Burt and Sheila arrive with Armitage and threaten to throw him, Zoe and her father into the burger-making machine. Sheila reveals that she killed Gingernut by mixing rat poison in with his food.

While trying to make Zoe's father fall into the machine, Sheila's weight causes the ladder that she, Burt and Zoe's father are standing on, to topple over. Burt and Sheila fall in and are turned into burgers. Armitage only survives because Burt flicks his hand upward after being bitten by him, and Zoe's father grabs onto the machine with one hand. Zoe then pulls him up, and she can see the rats eating the Burt and Sheila burgers.

Taking Armitage with them, Zoe and her father escape in Burt's van. Her father subsequently converts the vehicle into an ice cream van and launches his own company, Armitage's Ices, so that he can pursue his dream of making and selling ice cream with new flavours that he has invented. These prove popular with the local schoolchildren, and the business is a success. Meanwhile, Zoe has discovered that Tina is being bullied by her father. Tina apologises to Zoe for bullying her in return, and the two become friends. The next day, Zoe's suspension is lifted, and she and Armitage perform at the school talent show with Tina.

== Television film adaptation ==
On 22 February 2017, British broadcaster Sky UK announced that Ratburger was being adapted for TV and would be screened across the UK at Christmas. It was broadcast on Sky One at 18:00 on 24 December 2017.

The film starred:

- Talia Barnett as Zoe
- David Walliams as Burt
- Sheridan Smith as Sheila
- Mark Benton as Gary
- Tillie Amartey as Tina Trotts
- Nigel Planer as Headmaster
- Ben Bailey Smith as Charlie Jacobs
- Sarah Hadland as DC Grey
- Harish Patel as Raj
- Sophie Thompson as Miss Maxwell
- George Kent as Harry
- Charlotte Marsh as Jemma
- Jocelyn Jee Esien as WPC Budd
- Sophie Riley as Jade
- Sally Plumb as Linda
- Andi Peters as Presenter
- Robyn Payne Cooper as Kayleigh
- Chris Ellison as Landlord
