= David Walliams =

English comedian, writer and actor (born 1971)

David Walliams OBE
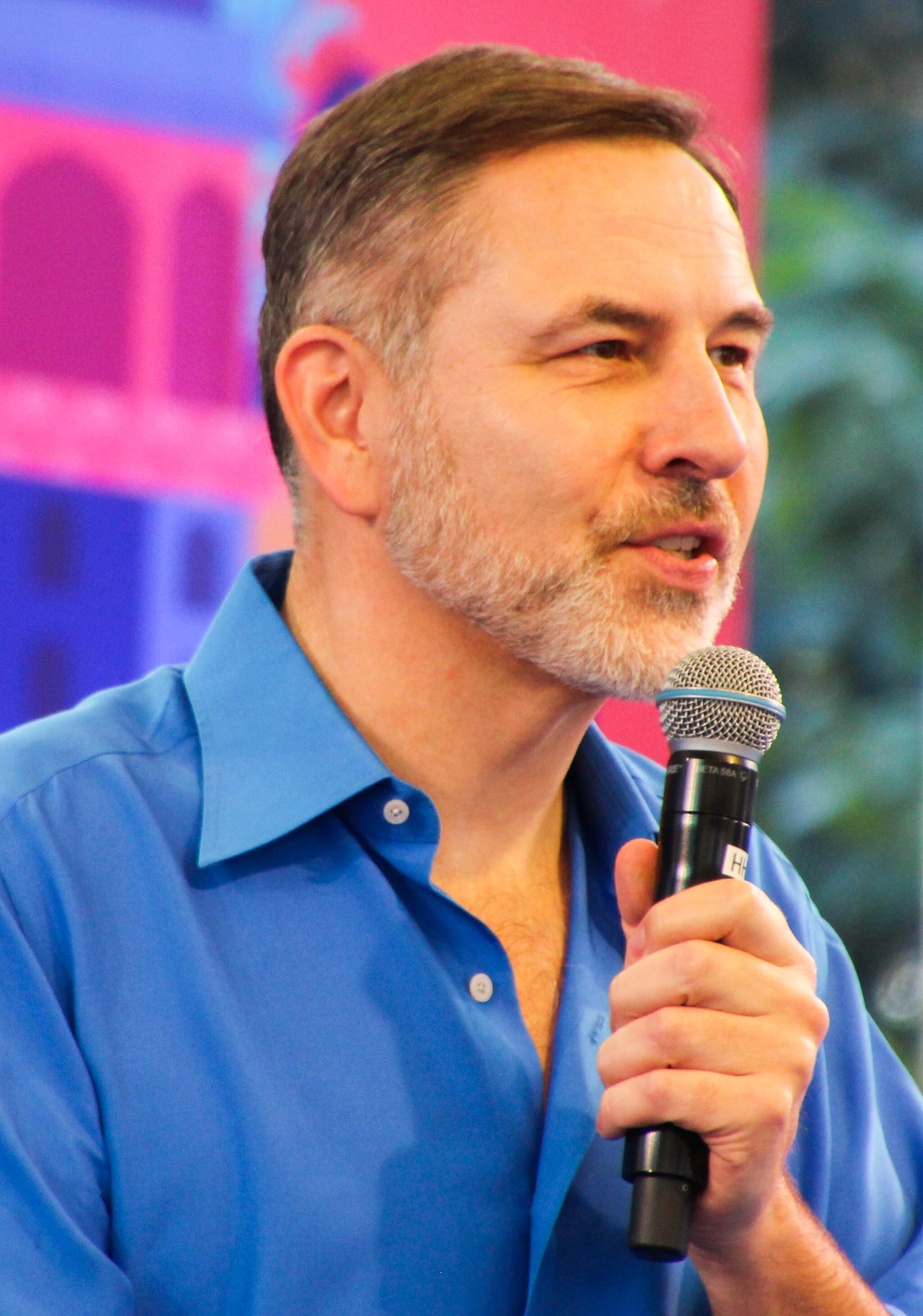
- Walliams in 2025
- Born: David Edward Williams; 20 August 1971 (age 55); Wimbledon, London, England
- Education: University of Bristol (BA)
- Occupations: Actor; comedian; writer; television personality
- Years active: 1995–present
- Works: Filmography; bibliography
- Spouse: Lara Stone (m. 2010; div. 2015)
- Children: 1

David Edward Williams (born 20 August 1971), known professionally as David Walliams (/ˈwæljəmz/), is an English actor, comedian, writer and television personality. He rose to prominence for his work with Matt Lucas on the BBC sketch comedy series Little Britain (2003–2006) and Come Fly with Me (2010–2011).

From 2012 to 2022, Walliams was a judge on the television talent competition Britain's Got Talent, for which he received multiple National Television Awards. In 2015, he starred as Tommy Beresford in the BBC drama series Partners in Crime, and wrote and starred in the BBC sketch comedy series Walliams & Friend. Walliams was appointed Officer of the Order of the British Empire (OBE) in the 2017 Birthday Honours for services to the arts and charity, which includes swimming the English Channel, Strait of Gibraltar and River Thames, raising millions of pounds for the BBC charity event Sport Relief.

Walliams began writing children's books in 2008 after securing a contract with the publisher HarperCollins. His books have been translated into 53 languages, and have sold 50 million copies worldwide. In 2018, he was described as "the fastest-growing children's author in the UK", with a literary style compared to that of Roald Dahl. Several of his books have been adapted for television, in which he has also appeared.

In the 2020s, Walliams has faced a series of allegations of inappropriate behaviour and sexual misconduct, including sexual harassment of staff at his then-publisher HarperCollins and sexually explicit remarks about contestants on Britain's Got Talent. In 2026, a joint investigation by The Guardian and ITV News reported allegations that he had groomed teenage girls and young women, including an allegation of sexual assault of a 15-year-old. Walliams unsuccessfully sought an injunction to prevent publication of the allegations. He has denied the allegations, and the Metropolitan Police is investigating separate allegations of sexual offences involving him.

== Early life and education ==
David Edward Williams was born on 20 August 1971 in Wimbledon, in the London Borough of Merton. He is the son of Peter Williams (1936–2007), a London Transport engineer, and Kathleen Williams (née Ellis), a laboratory technician. Walliams grew up in Nork, Surrey, with his mother, father, and sister Julie. He was educated at Collingwood Boys' School in Wallington, and Reigate Grammar School in Surrey, where he was a contemporary of writer Robert Shearman.

From 1989 to 1992, he studied at the University of Bristol, from which he graduated with a BA in drama. During university holidays in 1990, Walliams performed with the National Youth Theatre, where he met future comedy partner and friend Matt Lucas. He changed his stage name to David Walliams when he joined Equity, as there was already a member named David Williams.

== Television career ==
In 1999, Walliams performed in the Big Finish Productions Doctor Who audio play Phantasmagoria, written by Mark Gatiss. In 2005, Walliams, Simon Pegg, Lucy Davis and Lauren Laverne starred in the video for Charlotte Hatherley's single "Bastardo". Later in the year, Walliams presented a documentary on James Bond, entitled David Walliams: My Life with James Bond. In 2007, he returned to non-comedy television, garnering positive reviews for his portrayal of a suave and dangerous manipulator in Stephen Poliakoff's Capturing Mary.

He portrayed comedian Frankie Howerd in the BBC Four television film Rather You Than Me. In 2010, Walliams appeared with Paul Rudd and Steve Carell in the comedy Dinner for Schmucks. Walliams played the strange mole-like alien Gibbis in the sixth series of Doctor Who, in the episode "The God Complex", broadcast on BBC One in 2011. In April 2012 Walliams appeared in an episode of ITV's Perspectives programme entitled "David Walliams: The Genius of Dahl". Also in 2012, he narrated Are You Having a Laugh? TV and Disability on BBC Two, and the ITV2 series Top Dog Model.

In 2013, Walliams appeared in two episodes of the comedy series Blandings as Rupert Baxter, an efficiency expert hired to serve as Lord Emsworth's secretary. Also that year, and in 2014, Walliams starred as chemistry teacher Keith Church in the BBC One sitcom Big School, which he created and co-wrote. The series also starred Catherine Tate, Frances de la Tour and Philip Glenister.

For Comic Relief's Red Nose Day 2015, Walliams appeared as Lou Todd and Stephen Hawking in the Andy Pipkin role, along with Catherine Tate as a nun. In 2015, coinciding with the 125th anniversary of Agatha Christie's birth, Walliams played the role of Tommy Beresford in Partners in Crime, a six-part BBC series. In September 2015, Walliams began filming for his BBC sketch show Walliams & Friend, which also starred Joanna Lumley and Morgana Robinson and premiered on Christmas Eve in 2015. The show returned for a full series in November 2016.

In December 2016, Walliams hosted the final comedy show Thrills and Spills. The final was held in Louisville, Kentucky. In December 2016, Walliams presented the Royal Variety Performance and a Christmas special episode of Blankety Blank, both shows for ITV. In 2017, Walliams guest presented five episodes of The Nightly Show for ITV.

In 2017, Walliams, along with Rochelle Humes, were both confirmed as Voice Trumpets, joining the existing cast of Daniel Rigby, Antonia Thomas, Jim Broadbent, Fearne Cotton and Jane Horrocks in series 2 of the reboot of the British children's television series Teletubbies.

In October 2019, Walliams became the new National Television Awards host for 2020, taking over after Dermot O'Leary's ten-year presenting stint. He hosted the show for one year before being replaced by Joel Dommett.

Walliams reportedly performed two Nazi salutes during the recording of the BBC's 2025 Christmas special episode of Would I Lie to You?, drawing criticism. The BBC said the footage would not be broadcast.

=== Matt Lucas ===
Walliams and Matt Lucas first met at the National Youth Theatre. At their first meeting, Lucas did an impression of Jimmy Savile and Walliams an impression of Frankie Howerd. They did not meet again for another year. In the late 1990s, playing minor roles in sketches such as The Club, Walliams and Lucas played grotesque caricatures of various rock musicians in the series Rock Profile and in the spoof documentary series Sir Bernard's Stately Homes. They were also stars of the Paramount Comedy Channel show Mash and Peas, and it was in this guise that they appeared in the Fat Les video. Walliams and Lucas also had small roles in Plunkett & Macleane as prisoners.

In 2006, the duo appeared together in a music video for the Pet Shop Boys single "I'm with Stupid", in which the two are apparently auditioning their version of the song's video for Neil Tennant and Chris Lowe, who are tied up and appear to be hostages.

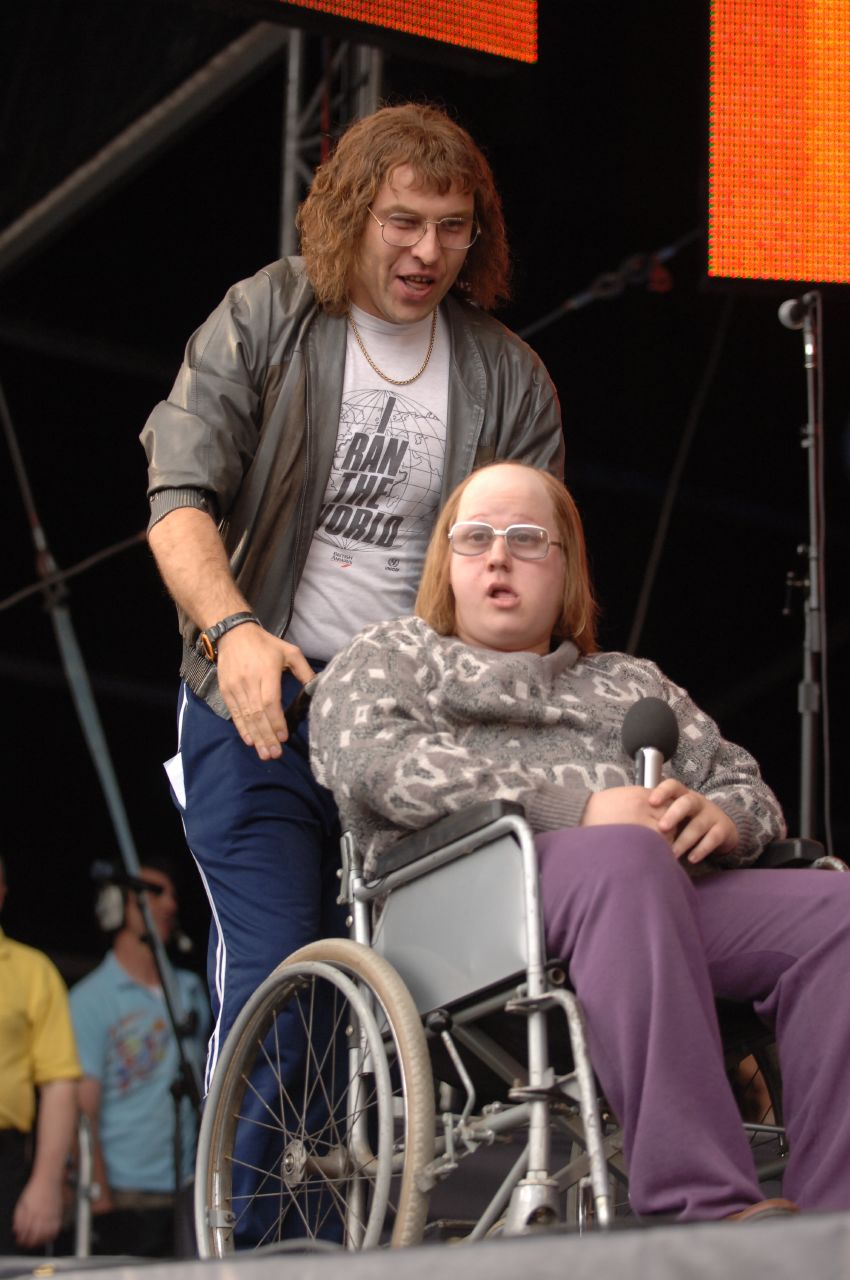
Walliams performing with Lucas as Little Britain characters Lou and Andy, at Live 8 in July 2005

The pair are best known for Little Britain, which ran from 2003 to 2006 on the BBC in the UK and in 2008 on HBO in the US. The programme first aired on BBC Three before moving to the more mainstream BBC One. Among the characters Walliams played were Emily Howard, a deluded "transvestite"; Ray McCooney, an insane Scottish hotel owner; and Sebastian Love, an aide de camp to the Prime Minister (portrayed by Anthony Head) on whom Love has a huge crush.

A successful live stage show of the series, Little Britain Live, was produced in 2006. A number of seasonal and charity specials followed, up to 2009. A spin-off series produced in the United States by HBO, Little Britain USA, aired in 2008. The characters from Little Britain played by Walliams and Lucas appeared in a 2010 UK television advertising campaign for the Nationwide Building Society. In January 2005 Walliams and Lucas were named the most powerful people in TV comedy by Radio Times.

Their later series was Come Fly with Me, a six-part series airing on BBC One. The first episode was the third most-watched programme of Christmas Day 2010, and the most watched comedy of the year. The duo have not worked or made any public appearances together since early 2011 (although they each make separate cameo appearances in Michael Winterbottom's 2013 film The Look of Love).

Little Britain returned to BBC Radio 4 on 31 October 2019, for a one-off special entitled Little Brexit.

In June 2020, Netflix, Britbox and BBC iPlayer dropped Walliams and Lucas' Little Britain, with the latter two services saying "times have changed". In Little Britain, both Walliams and Lucas use makeup to portray different races, with Walliams portraying a black health spa guest called Desiree DeVere. Variety magazine attributed the widespread removal of the series on streaming platforms to heightened awareness in the wake of the killing of George Floyd and the resulting Black Lives Matter protests. After the removal, Walliams and Lucas released identical apologies on their Twitter: "[We] have both spoken publicly in recent years of our regret that we played characters of other races. Once again we want to make it clear that it was wrong & we are very sorry."

=== Got Talent franchise ===
From 2012 to 2022, Walliams was a judge on the ITV1 talent show Britain's Got Talent with Amanda Holden, Alesha Dixon and Simon Cowell. In 2015, 2018 and 2019, he was recognised at the National Television Awards as Best Judge for his involvement in the series.

In 2022, Walliams joined Seven Network's Australia's Got Talent as a judge for the show's tenth season, alongside fellow Britain's Got Talent judge Alesha Dixon, and Australian actors Kate Ritchie and Shane Jacobson.

In November 2022, after controversy regarding leaked disparaging comments made by Walliams to contestants, Walliams left the show. He was replaced by Strictly Come Dancing judge Bruno Tonioli.

== Writing career ==
=== Children's novels ===
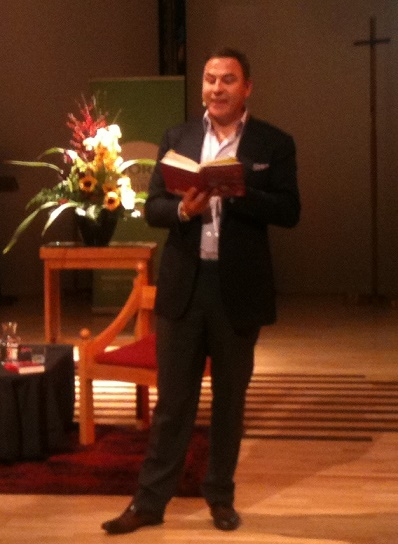
Walliams at the WORD Christchurch Festival 2015

In early 2008, Walliams signed a contract with HarperCollins to publish two children's books. The debut novel, The Boy in the Dress, illustrated by Quentin Blake, was released worldwide on 1 November 2008. It explores several of the themes of Little Britain from Walliams's own life on an emotional level, such as the camp humour of cross-dressing and effeminacy. The story recounts a neglected 12-year-old boy called Dennis' search for a female role model, his friendship with the popular girl in school, and the ways in which relationships develop along gender lines. The story has a strong resonance with Anne Fine's 1989 book Bill's New Frock. This book was adapted into a film for Christmas 2014.

In November 2009 came Mr Stink, again illustrated by Quentin Blake, about a 12-year-old girl who meets a homeless person and helps look after him. She keeps him hidden from her family. The book consists of 26 illustrated chapters full of jokes. It is aimed at teenagers and children over 9. It was the last of Walliams's books to be illustrated by Quentin Blake. The book was awarded the Children's Award in the inaugural People's Book Prize in 2010, and was made into a 60-minute film, which premiered on BBC One on 23 December 2012.

In October 2010, Walliams published his third book Billionaire Boy, telling the story of Joe Spud, the richest 12-year-old in the country. Joe's father is a famous inventor, and his wealth means that Joe has everything he could ever want: his own bowling alley, cinema and a trained orangutan who serves as his butler, but there is just one thing he really needs: a friend. This was the first of his books to be illustrated by Tony Ross.

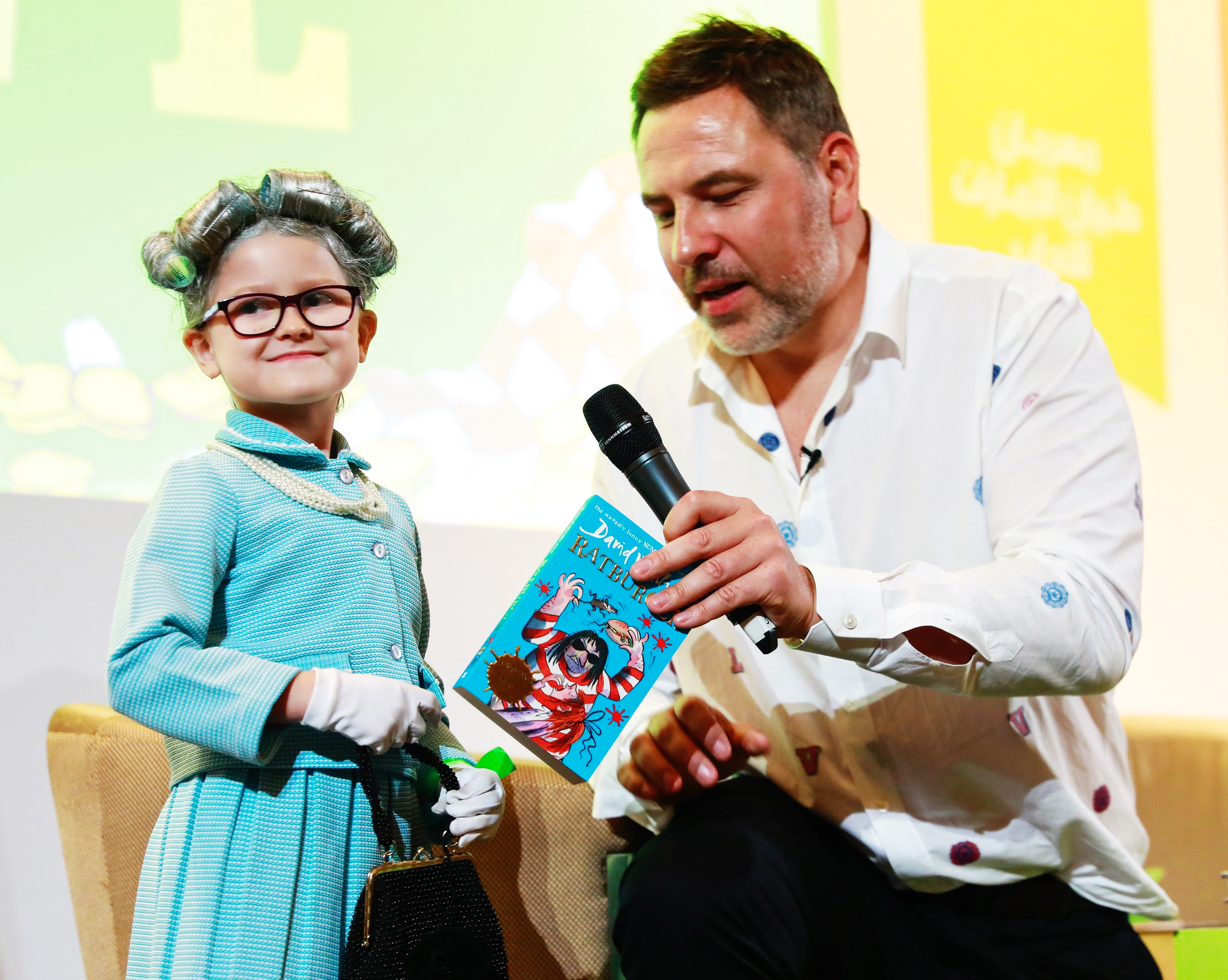
Walliams at Emirates Airline Festival of Literature in 2018

In October 2011, Walliams's fourth book, Gangsta Granny, was released and again illustrated by Tony Ross. It tells the story of Ben who is bored every time he is made to stay at his grandma's house as all she wants to do is to play board games and eat cabbage soup. Ben learns that she was once an international jewel thief and all her life she has wanted to steal the crown jewels. Ben is determined that they do it together. It won a Red House Children's Book Award and was adapted to be a 70-minute film for BBC One and shown on 26 December 2013.

In September 2012, Walliams released his fifth children's book, Ratburger, telling the story of a young girl named Zoe whose life is a misery as she has an evil stepmother. It was made into a one-off drama for Sky One.

In September 2013, Walliams's sixth book, Demon Dentist was published, relating the tale of a young boy named Alfie with no family except his dad whose world goes upside-down when a new dentist arrives in town. The book won the top prize in the Younger Readers category at the 2015 Red House Children's Book Awards.

In September 2014, Walliams's seventh children's book, Awful Auntie, was released. This was the story of a girl named Stella whose Auntie has moved into her house with her owl, Wagner. It is the first (and currently only) of Walliams's books to not include Raj the newsagent, due to the book being set in the 1930s before Raj was born.

In September 2015, he released Grandpa's Great Escape. The story follows a boy called Jack trying to rescue his Grandpa who suffers from Alzheimer's disease from a care home run by an evil matron. The book was adapted for BBC One, with the script written by Walliams and Kevin Cecil, and starring Tom Courtenay as Grandpa. This book, being set in the 1980s, sees the return of Raj the newsagent. The same year that Grandpa's Great Escape was published, Walliams backed children's fairytales app GivingTales in aid of UNICEF, together with Roger Moore, Stephen Fry, Ewan McGregor, Joan Collins, Joanna Lumley, Michael Caine, Charlotte Rampling and Paul McKenna.

In November 2016, The Midnight Gang was published. Bad Dad was published in November 2017. Walliams sold £16.57 million worth of books in 2017. The Ice Monster was published in November 2018, for which he was awarded the 2019 Nibbie for Children's Fiction Book of the Year. However, The British Book Awards withdrew the award in November 2026, following the publication of extensive allegations of sexual assault.

In 2018, Walliams's books constituted 44% of all sales of HarperCollins children's titles, generating revenue of £100 million by 2019; as of the summer of 2025, sales of his books had fallen by 60%. Former HarperCollins UK CEO Charlie Redmayne had departed the company in October 2025, under unexplained circumstances, with Kate Elton succeeding him.

In 2020, the book Code Name Bananas, which was set in World War II-era Britain was published, and was announced on Walliams's Instagram. Walliams's next children's novel, Spaceboy, was published in September 2022. On 5 April 2023, the children's novel Robodog was published. The story is about Robodog, the newest recruit at the police dog school, as he sets out to save his city from some evil criminals trying to destroy it.

In 2021, Alton Towers amusement park opened a "World of David Walliams" area, featuring references to Gangsta Granny, Raj and Flavio. The area was permanently closed at the end of the 2026 season. The park did not state a reason for the previously unannounced closure.

In December 2025, HarperCollins terminated their contract with Walliams following a year-long investigation into alleged inappropriate behaviour and harassment towards young women at the company, during which one employee was given a five-figure payoff and female staff were advised to only visit him in pairs.

=== Picture books ===
No.	Title	Release date	Illustrator	Pages
1	The Slightly Annoying Elephant	7 November 2013	Tony Ross	32
2	The First Hippo on the Moon	20 October 2014	Tony Ross	32
3	The Queen's Orang-utan	26 February 2015	Tony Ross	32
4	The Bear Who Went Boo!	5 November 2015	Tony Ross	32
5	There's a Snake in My School!	19 September 2016	Tony Ross	32
6	Boogie Bear	26 July 2018	Tony Ross	40
7	Geronimo	15 November 2018	Tony Ross	32
8	The Creature Choir	12 December 2019	Tony Ross	32
9	Little Monsters	15 October 2020	Adam Stower	32
10	Marmalade: The Orange Panda	17 February 2022	Adam Stower	32
11	Grannysaurus	8 December 2022	Adam Stower	32
11	Little Monsters Rule!	26 October 2023	Adam Stower	32

=== Short story collections ===
Illustrated in colour by Tony Ross, Walliams's three The World's Worst Children short story collections, centered around 'five beastly boys and five gruesome girls', were published in May 2016, May 2017 and May 2018, respectively. The World's Worst Teachers was published on 27 June. 2019.

In July 2020, tweets by author and activist Jack Monroe described Walliams's books as "like Little Britain for kids", with "horrific racism and classism and bodyshaming in a veneer of privileged deniability". HarperCollins issued a response, stating "David Walliams's books have a diverse readership which is reflected in their content". Also in July 2020, Walliams's next book, The World's Worst Parents was published, and the book followed the same structure as all of the previous short story collection books. HarperCollins' termination of their contract with Walliams in 2025 resulted in people looking at the themes in his books with "renewed scrutiny".

In September 2021, it was announced that one of the stories in The World's Worst Children would be removed after podcaster Georgie Ma made a complaint, saying Walliams's book was "normalising jokes on minorities from a young age." The story criticised by Ma earlier in the year is "about a Chinese boy called Brian Wong" who is "never, ever wrong". Ma, who also criticised the story for its "casual racism", spoke earlier in the year with representatives of HarperCollins, who agreed to remove the story in future editions of the book. The book was later republished in 2022, with a new story about Charlie the Chucker, who "delights in pelting people with snowballs".

On 28 April 2022, Walliams's next book in the short story collections, titled The World's Worst Pets, was published. This book was illustrated by Adam Stower, Walliams's new illustrator, whereas all the other books in the series were illustrated by Tony Ross. The next book of the series, The World's Worst Monsters, was published on 6 July 2023, followed by The World's Worst Superheroes on 22 May 2025.

== Other work ==
=== Theatre ===
On 26 August 2008, Walliams made his stage debut at the Gate Theatre in Dublin opposite Michael Gambon in Harold Pinter's No Man's Land, in front of an audience that included Pinter himself. The production transferred to London later in the year.

In 2013, he played the part of Bottom in a production of A Midsummer Night's Dream at the Noël Coward Theatre opposite Sheridan Smith as Titania.

In July 2014, Walliams appeared on stage with Monty Python during their live show Monty Python Live (Mostly) held at the O_{2} Arena, London. He was the special guest in their "Blackmail" sketch.

=== Screenwriting ===
In addition to his writing credits for his sketch shows and adaptions of his novels, he was set to co-write an animated film titled Shadows with filmmaker Edgar Wright for DreamWorks Animation. It was never made due to the staff changes at DreamWorks animation which left the film in limbo.

In 2018, Walliams also starred in a British Airways safety video, which was conducted in conjunction with Comic Relief for the airline's in-house charity.

=== Podcast ===
Walliams hosted a classical music podcast for children called David Walliams' Marvellous Musical Podcast. The show was produced by Classic FM and won a gold prize at the 2020 British Podcast Awards.

=== Charity work ===
==== Telethon hosting ====
Walliams co-hosted a segment of the Sport Relief telethon in 2012, co-hosting the 22:00–22:40 slot with Miranda Hart when the show moved over to BBC Two while the BBC News at Ten was aired.

Walliams also co-hosted the 2014 Sport Relief telethon. This time, he hosted the earlier slot between 19:00–22:00 with Gary Lineker and later Davina McCall.

==== Swimming the English Channel ====
On 4 July 2006, Walliams swam the English Channel for Sport Relief. It took him 10 hours and 34 minutes to swim the 22-mile (35 km) stretch of sea, equivalent to 700 lengths of an Olympic-size swimming pool. This was wrongly reported as one of the top 50 recorded times for an unaided Channel crossing; in reality Walliams placed 167th at the time of crossing in only the CSA listings, excluding the CSPF listings. He raised over £1 million in donations. Under the supervision of his trainer, he trained for nine months to prepare for the swim. The training had to coincide with Walliams and Lucas's Little Britain Live tour, so he daily had to train for several hours before performing on stage in the evening.

Walliams first swam from Lee-on-the-Solent near Portsmouth to the Isle of Wight in around two hours and also completed an eight-hour swim off the coast of Croatia before embarking on the cross-Channel attempt. Walliams has insisted that prior to his challenge he had never seriously taken part in any sport. The Bluetones' lead singer Mark Morriss wrote a song, "Fade In/Fade Out", in honour of Walliams's achievement; it can be found on their self-titled album, released on 9 October 2006.

==== Swimming the Strait of Gibraltar ====
On 7 March 2008, Walliams, along with James Cracknell, swam the 12-mile (19 km) Strait of Gibraltar from Spain to Morocco, again for Sport Relief. He successfully completed the swim in just over 4½ hours.

==== Cycling ====
In March 2010, Walliams and a group of celebrities cycled an end-to-end journey through the UK, raising over £1 million for Sport Relief. Walliams suffered a serious fall when tackling the Kirkstone Pass, a thousand-foot climb in the Lake District but was able to complete the ride.

==== 24 Hour Panel People ====
In March 2011, Walliams undertook 24 Hour Panel People, in which he took part in back-to-back recordings of various panel show formats over the course of 24 hours to raise money for Comic Relief. The recordings were streamed live on the BBC website. He took part in 19 episodes of "classic" TV panel shows.

Show	Show Name	Host	Walliams's role	Other participants & Notes
1	Would I Lie to You?	Rob Brydon regular	Panellist	Team captains: regulars David Mitchell and Lee Mack. Panellists: Shappi Khorsandi, Fay Ripley and Claudia Winkleman
2	8 Out of 10 Cats	Jimmy Carr regular	Captain	Other team captain: Sean Lock regular. Panellists: Jamelia, Josh Widdicombe, Jon Richardson and Victoria Coren
3	Just a Minute	Nicholas Parsons regular	Panellist	Panellists: Lee Mack, Sheila Hancock and Tony Hawks
4	It's Only TV...but I Like It	Jack Dee former team captain	Panellist	Team captains: Ulrika Jonsson and Charlie Brooker. Panellists: Danny Wallace, Tom Deacon and Penny Smith
5	The Generation Game	Vernon Kay	Team member	Team 1: Walliams with his mother Kathleen. Team 2: Miranda Hart and Patricia Hodge, who play mother and daughter in the sitcom Miranda
6	Through the Keyhole	David Frost regular	Panellist	Panellists: David Tennant and Patricia Hodge. Dawn Porter was the guide. The celebrity whose house was shown was Ann Widdecombe.
7	Blankety Blank	Paul O'Grady (this time as himself, having only done so before as Lily Savage)	Panellist	Panellists: Barbara Windsor, David Tennant, George Lamb, Keith Harris and Orville and Stacey Solomon, with Lee Ryan and Duncan James from Blue playing as contestants
8	Mock the Week	Dara Ó Briain regular	Panellist	Panellists: regular Andy Parsons with guests: Andrew Maxwell, Daniel Sloss, Doc Brown and Seann Walsh
9	Celebrity Juice	Keith Lemon regular	Panellist	Panellists: regulars Rufus Hound and Jedward with guests Germaine Greer and Lauren Laverne
10	Argumental	David Walliams	Host	Team captains: regulars Rufus Hound and Marcus Brigstocke. Guests: Dara Ó Briain and Jo Brand; During the show it was said that Walliams had done 12 hours.
11	QI	Stephen Fry regular	Panellist	Panellists: Russell Tovey, Jo Brand and Sue Perkins
12	They Think It's All Over	Nick Hancock original host	Panellist	Team captains: former regular Lee Hurst and Phil Tufnell. Panellists: Dave Berry, Gabby Logan and Richard Bacon
13	Call My Bluff	Angus Deayton	Panellist	Panellists: Alex Horne, Roisin Conaty, Russell Tovey, Tim Key and Sarah Cawood
14	Give Us a Clue	Sara Cox	Panellist	Guests: Christopher Biggins, Lionel Blair, Una Stubbs, Holly Walsh and Jenni Falconer
15	What's My Line?	Stephen K. Amos	Guest	Guests: Christopher Biggins and Holly Walsh
16	Mastermind	Griff Rhys Jones	Contestant	Contestants: Adam Woodyatt
17	Have I Got News for You	Patrick Kielty	Panellist	Panellists: Clive Anderson, Lembit Öpik and Holly Walsh
18	Whose Line Is It Anyway?	Clive Anderson regular	Panellist	Panellists: Humphrey Ker with regular members Josie Lawrence, Neil Mullarkey and Tony Slattery
19	Never Mind the Buzzcocks	David Walliams	Host	Panellists: Alexa Chung, Chris O'Dowd, Matt Edmondson, Robert Webb, Neil Tennant and Nick Grimshaw

==== Swimming the Thames ====
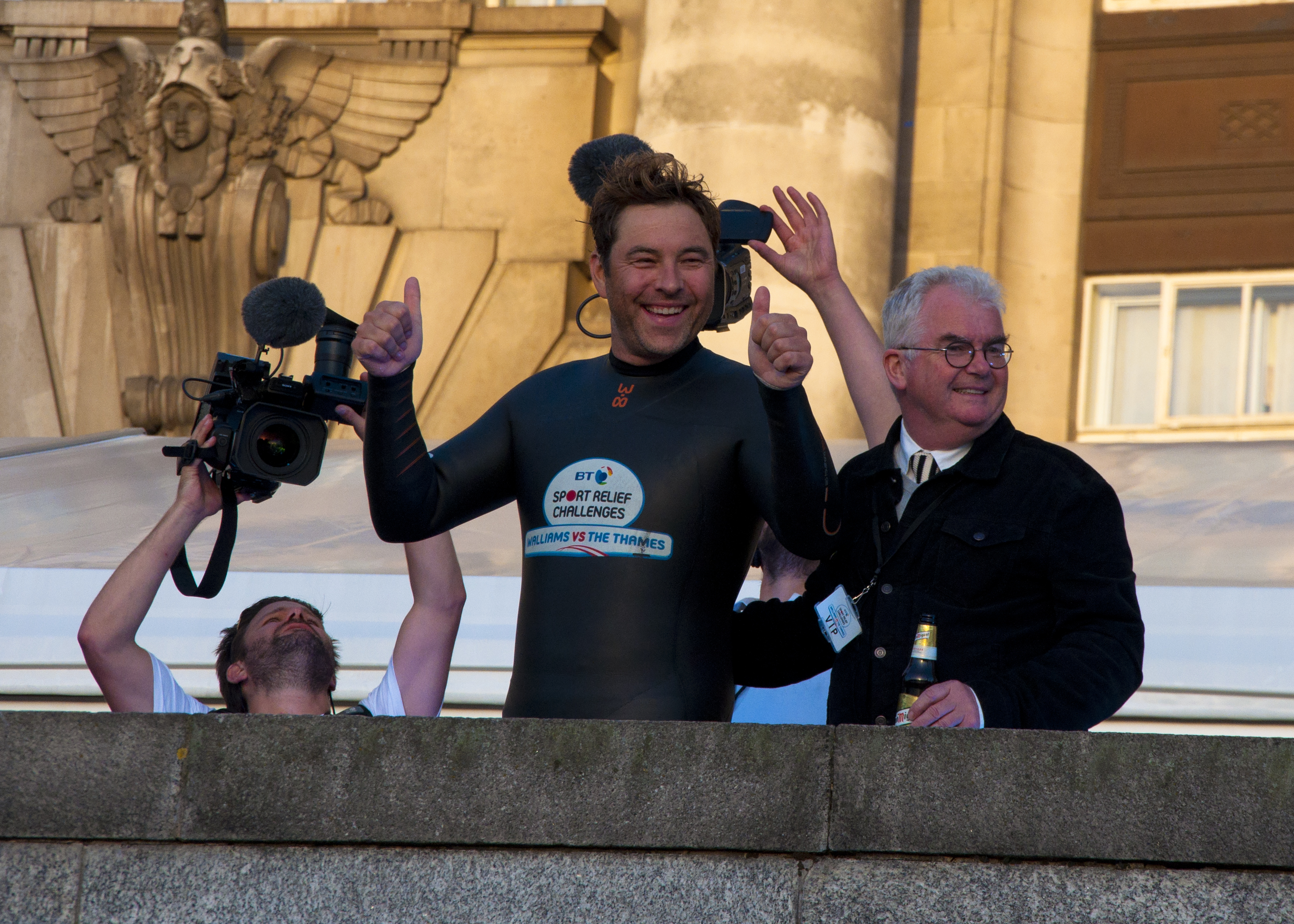
Walliams in 2011 after swimming the Thames for Sports Relief

From 5 to 12 September 2011 Walliams swam the River Thames from Lechlade to Westminster Bridge (140 miles [230 km]) and raised more than £2 million for Sport Relief. Once he had got out of the river Walliams said "I think a bath is the only water I will be seeing for a while." The swim resulted in him getting giardiasis and injuring an intervertebral disc. In late 2013, Walliams had emergency back surgery to alleviate issues caused by the swim.

== Personal life ==
In 2007, Walliams's father, Peter, died of an aggressive form of liver cancer.

In 2009, Walliams began dating Dutch model Lara Stone. On 20 January 2010, they got engaged after her parents had given their blessing to the relationship. On 16 May 2010, the couple were married at central London's Claridge's Hotel. On 6 May 2013, Stone gave birth to the couple's child.

Walliams and Stone lived in a house with a recording studio, formerly owned by Noel Gallagher, known as Supernova Heights in Belsize Park, North London. It was reported on 4 March 2015 that, following five years of marriage, the pair had decided to try a trial separation after "drifting apart". Walliams filed for divorce from Stone, citing "unreasonable behaviour", and the couple were granted a decree nisi on 10 September 2015; the marriage was formally dissolved six weeks after the date the conditional order was granted.

Walliams hinted about his sexuality in the 2007 book Inside Little Britain and provided more detail in an interview with Radio Times in 2013, stating:

I think it's all about falling in love with the person and that is overlooked, really. I hate it when people 'confess' or 'reveal' their sexuality and also things can change for people over the years. So it is about the person but I also think it goes beyond that. You don't just fall in love with someone's body, do you? You fall in love with someone's soul and heart and brain.

In 2024, Walliams said he would identify as non-binary if he were younger. Walliams has referred to himself as "Britain's most famous bi-curious comedian", and said he experimented with men in his youth. He has affirmed his love for gay culture.

Walliams has been diagnosed with bipolar disorder, and he described his 2006 swim of the English Channel as "some sort of redemption".

== Public image and legal issues ==
=== Kim Jong-un costume ===
In early November 2017, Walliams caused upset through his dressing as North Korean leader Kim Jong-un for Halloween and posting it online. He had shared the photograph on his Twitter account, in costume, wearing a black suit, wig, and artificial prosthetics that appeared to alter his eyelids and hairline. There was an immediate backlash online, with many Twitter users branding the outfit "racist" and accusing Walliams of "yellow-face". Others suggested that it was insensitive for Walliams to dress as Kim Jong-un given the North Korean leader's 'appalling' human rights record. Walliams responded to the backlash lightly, constructing a fake text message from Kim Jong-un which he posted to Twitter, reading: "Hi Dave, Loved the Halloween outfit mate! Wet meself laughing. Don't see what all the fuss is about. Kim x. PS Can't wait to read Bad Dad."

=== Britain's Got Talent ===
In November 2022, it emerged that Walliams had made sexually explicit and derogatory remarks about two contestants during breaks in recording of Britain's Got Talent at the London Palladium in January 2020. In a statement later, he acknowledged having made the comments in private conversation, but nevertheless apologised. In 2023, Walliams reached a settlement with the production company Fremantle after filing a lawsuit alleging that the release of the recording breached data protection regulations.

=== Allegations of sexual misconduct and grooming ===
In December 2025, Walliams was dropped as a client by HarperCollins UK following an investigation into alleged inappropriate behaviour and harassment towards junior female staff. Walliams was withdrawn from the line‑up of Waterstones' 2025 Children's Book Festival following the allegations. A spokesperson for Walliams said: "David strongly denies that he has behaved inappropriately and is taking legal advice." HarperCollins initially said it would continue publishing Walliams's existing titles, but on 18 September 2026, reversed that decision and withdrew his entire back catalogue. HarperCollins also removed Walliams's author page and biography from its website.

On 10 November 2026, The Guardian and ITV News published a joint investigation into allegations that Walliams had used his position in the media to pursue women and girls for sex. The allegations included the sexual assault of a girl aged 15 and the grooming of several other teenagers. Walliams denied the allegations. Walliams had unsuccessfully sought a permanent injunction to prevent publication, arguing that publication created a risk that he would take his own life. At the hearing, the judge noted that Walliams was being treated as an inpatient at a psychiatric hospital.

Following the publication of the allegations, the BBC announced that it would remove some programmes featuring Walliams from iPlayer, including episodes of Little Britain. Independent Talent Group also ended its representation of Walliams, while the Labour Party suspended his membership. The book industry also responded to the allegations. British retailers The Works and TG Jones stopped selling his books, while Waterstones, Europe's largest bookseller group, said it would return its remaining stock to HarperCollins.

On 13 November 2026, the Metropolitan Police announced that it had launched an investigation into Walliams over "alleged serious sexual offences". The allegations were separate from those reported by ITN and The Guardian, although "detectives are also proactively reviewing that reporting to establish whether there is any evidence of offences".

The "Hide the Sausage" sketch, performed during the Little Britain Live tour and at charity events, featured Walliams as a fictional former children's entertainer and sex offender who pulled down audience members' trousers and simulated sexual acts. The sketch was criticised by gay rights campaigners and others, particularly because some participants were teenagers as young as 16. On 15 November 2026, it was reported that actor Jeremy Edwards had said Walliams "sexually humiliated" him during a 2006 Comic Relief performance of the sketch by pulling down his trousers and underwear, exposing his genitals in front of the audience. Edwards said that he had only been told his trousers would be pulled down and that he had not consented to being exposed. He described the incident as abuse, saying, "I did not agree to it."

== Awards and honours ==
Walliams was given a special award in recognition of his sporting efforts for charity. Matt Lucas produced a documentary on the subject, entitled Little Britain's Big Swim. On 6 November 2006, Walliams won the Pride of Britain Award for "The Most Influential Public Figure" as he raised more than £1.5 million swimming the channel for the Sport Relief charity. Although initially tipped as a contender for the BBC's Sports Personality of the Year poll for 2006, Walliams failed to make the final shortlist of 10 contenders. Walliams was given a special award during the ceremony for his achievement. In July 2006, he became Patron of Cardiac Risk in the Young.

At the 2012 National Television Awards, Walliams won the 'Landmark Achievement Award', for his television career and achievements for Sport Relief. In December 2012, he won the Specsavers National Book Awards "Children's Book of the Year" for Ratburger. In December 2013, he won the Specsavers National Book Awards "Children's Book of the Year" for Demon Dentist. In December 2014, he won the Specsavers National Book Awards "Children's Book of the Year" for Awful Auntie. Awful Auntie also won the 2014 Specsavers National Book Awards "Audiobook of the Year".

Walliams has won the award for Best TV Judge at the 2015, 2018 and 2019 National Television Awards.

Walliams was appointed Officer of the Order of the British Empire (OBE) in the 2017 Birthday Honours for services to charity and the arts. He was invested with the honour by Princess Anne.
