= Grandpa's Great Escape =

2015 children's book written by David Walliams and illustrated by Tony Ross

- First edition
- Author: David Walliams
- Illustrator: Tony Ross
- Language: English
- Genre: Children's fiction
- Publisher: HarperCollins
- Publication date: 24 September 2015
- Publication place: United Kingdom
- Media type: Print (hardcover)
- Pages: 461
- ISBN: 0007494017

Grandpa's Great Escape is a children's book written by David Walliams and illustrated by Tony Ross. It was released by HarperCollins on 24 September 2015. The story follows a boy called Jack trying to rescue his confused Grandpa from a retirement home, Twilight Towers run by an evil matron, Miss Swine.

The book was adapted for BBC One, with the script written by Walliams and Kevin Cecil. It starred Tom Courtenay as Grandpa. Its British television premiere was on New Year's Day 2018.

The book was discontinued and withdrawn from publication with Walliams' entire back catalogue on 18 September 2026.

== Plot ==
Grandpa's Great Escape is set in London in 1983 and tells the tale of Grandpa, a World War II flying ace, who sadly is now confused due to Alzheimer's disease, and is still believing that World War II hasn't ended and longing to re-live his past. When his family can no longer look after him, Grandpa is moved to Twilight Towers, a prison-esque old people's home run by Miss Swine, where the latter abuses the residents of the home.

It soon becomes clear Miss Swine is running Twilight Towers for her own personal gain, and it is up to Grandpa and his 12-year-old grandson Jack, the only one who can understand his beliefs, to make a daring escape. Grandpa takes a final chance to relive his past and once again flies in his beloved Spitfire.

== Reception ==
Linda Lawlor from The Book Bag gave Grandpa's Great Escape a 4-and-a-half-star review, saying "Utterly silly from start to finish and yet it leaves the reader with a warm, cosy feeling. Forget about whether anything in the plot makes the slightest sense – just sit back and enjoy the ride" and "Tony Ross's superb illustrations add immeasurably to the carefree, slightly manic tone of the text."

== Adaptations ==
=== Television film adaptation ===
On 22 September 2017 it was announced that the book would be adapted for BBC One and be shown at Christmas 2017. The script was written by Walliams and Kevin Cecil and starred Tom Courtenay as Grandpa, Kit Connor as Jack and Jennifer Saunders as Miss Dandy, with Samantha Spiro and Walliams as Jack's parents, Patricia and Barry. The film was shown on New Year's Day 2018 to an overnight audience of around 5 million.

=== Arena stage adaptation ===
A stage adaptation opened at the Arena Birmingham on 23, 24 and 26 December 2019 and toured to The SSE Arena, Wembley on 27 and 28 December, FlyDSA Arena, Sheffield on 29 December, Motorpoint Arena Nottingham on 30 December, Manchester Arena on 1 January 2020, Utilita Arena Newcastle on 2 January, The SSE Hydro, Glasgow on 3 January and M&S Bank Arena, Liverpool on 4 January.

The production was adapted by Kevin Cecil and directed by Sean Foley and starred Nigel Planer as Grandpa.
