= Kevin Cecil =

British screenwriter

- Born: 1969 (age 56–57); London, England
- Education: University of Oxford
- Occupations: Screenwriter and television producer.
- Writing career
- Period: 1993–present
- Genres: Comedy, adventure, science fiction

Kevin Robert Cecil (born 1969 in London) is a British screenwriter.

Writing alongside Andy Riley (with whom he has been best friends since attending Aylesbury Grammar School), he has won two BAFTA awards, the first for writing the Comic Relief one-off special Robbie the Reindeer in 2000, and the second for Black Books in 2005.

He has also written for VEEP, The Armando Iannucci Shows, Armstrong & Miller, Little Britain, Trigger Happy TV, So Graham Norton, Smack the Pony and Spitting Image and on radio he co-created The 99p Challenge.

The second Robbie the Reindeer special, "Legend of the Lost Tribe", which Cecil and Riley co-wrote won an International Emmy for best children's programme in 2003.

Kevin also co-created and wrote a Sci-Fi comedy series for television entitled Hyperdrive. The first series aired on BBC2 in 2006, and the second series aired on the same channel in 2007. The programme starred Nick Frost, Kevin Eldon and Miranda Hart who was nominated for best newcomer in the British Comedy Awards in 2006 for her role in the programme.

An animated series Slacker Cats he and Andy Riley created was broadcast on the ABC Family Channel in 2007.

He has worked on a number of feature films including Gnomeo and Juliet, the Aardman adaptation of Gideon Defoe's The Pirates! in an Adventure with Scientists and The Corpse Bride (uncredited).

In 2013, he co-wrote Gangsta Granny.

In 2016 he won a Writers Guild of America award for his work on Veep.

He has also appeared in the episode of the IT crowd 'Something happened', where he starred as Norman the geeky keyboard player.

== Awards and nominations ==
Year	Award	Work	Category	Result	Reference
2012	Annie Award	Gnomeo & Juliet (shared with Kelly Asbury, Mark Burton, Andy Riley, Emily Cook, Kathy Greenberg, Steve Hamilton Shaw, John R. Smith and Rob Sprackling)	Writing in a Feature Production	Nominated	
2014	Online Film & Television Association Award	Veep	Best Writing in a Comedy Series	Won	
2015	Primetime Emmy Award	Veep	Outstanding Comedy Series	Won	
2015	Writers Guild of America Award	Veep	Comedy Series	Nominated	
2016	Writers Guild of America Award	Veep	Comedy Series	Won	
2016	Producers Guild of America Award	Veep, Season Four	Outstanding Producer of Episodic Television, Comedy	Nominated	
