= The Boy in the Dress (novel) =

Book by David Walliams

- First hardback edition
- Author: David Walliams
- Illustrator: Quentin Blake
- Language: English
- Genre: Children's fiction (8-12)
- Publisher: HarperCollins
- Publication date: 1 October 2008
- Publication place: United Kingdom
- Media type: Print
- Pages: 288
- ISBN: 0-00-727903-5
- OCLC: 233262822

The Boy In The Dress is a comedic children's book written by David Walliams and illustrated by Quentin Blake, published in October 2008. It is the first book by Walliams, a television comedian best known at the time for the BBC show Little Britain. It tells the story of a fourteen-year-old boy called John and a twelve-year-old boy called Dennis who is encouraged by a rebellious friend to cross-dress and the reactions of his family, friends and school.

It is aimed at readers aged eight to twelve, and has been adapted into a television film and a musical. It was permanently withdrawn on 18 September 2026 by HarperCollins along with all of David Walliams' other titles, as part of their decision to stop selling and reprinting any books by David Walliams.

== Background ==
David Walliams noted that The Boy In The Dress is personal to him as it draws on the experiences of his childhood. When he was a child, his sisters would dress him up and he played many female roles in school.

== Plot ==
The story follows a 12-year-old boy named Dennis, who lives in an ordinary house in an ordinary street in an ordinary town with his 14-year-old brother John. The boys remain with their father (referred to only as Dad), who resorts to comfort eating after his wife leaves, with Dennis and John driven apart. Dennis is talented in football and is one of the best on his team.

However, he deeply misses his mother, who left their family about five years ago, and finds comfort remembering his mother's yellow dress in an old picture. Dennis sees the same dress on the cover of a Vogue magazine and buys a copy from Raj, the local shop owner. But when Dad finds the magazine, he is furious and forces Dennis to throw it away, while John teases him by calling him "Denise".

At school that day, Dennis is given detention for kicking a football through an office window. While in detention, he talks to a girl named Lisa James, said to be the prettiest and most fashionable girl in the school. Lisa invites him over to her house the next day, showing Dennis her collection of Vogue magazines and dressing him up in girls' clothing.

The next week, the two decide to go out in public, with Dennis in an electric blue dress, under the alter ego of "Denise", a French exchange student who speaks very little English. They go to Raj's corner shop. Raj does not recognise Dennis, believing he is Denise. Later on, they meet a friend of Lisa's named Mac, and he is so impressed that he asks Denise on a date, not knowing that it was actually Dennis. Following their success in fooling Raj and Mac, Dennis goes to school with Lisa as Denise.

In French class, the teacher starts speaking to Dennis in French (which he does not understand), and he ends up criticizing her French accent as a last resort, upsetting her in the progress. At breaktime, Darvesh kicks a ball towards Dennis, who cannot help himself, and kicks it back, causing his wig to fall off. Mr. Hawtrey becomes furious and expels him from the school for cross-dressing, forcing Dennis to miss out on playing in an important football match.

Dad is enraged and sends Dennis to his room. Later, Dad sees him holding the half burned picture of Dennis, John, and his mother on the beach and demands he hand it over, which he reluctantly does. Darvesh, Dennis's best friend, comes over but is sent back home by Dad. After, Dennis spends the whole day holed up in his room hiding from his father, when Lisa climbs up to Dennis's window and promises him that she'll find a way to get him back in school.

Persuaded by Darvesh, Dennis attends the game anyway. Maudlin Street, the rival football team, has won the trophy for the past 3 years and holds a notorious reputation for playing rough and dirty. Dennis learns that without him— the "star striker"— around, Maudlin Street was able to get a huge lead with a score of 6-0, and defeat seems bound to happen. Right after the first half finishes, Lisa gets up, tells Mac she "needs a hand", and leaves with him.

As the second half starts, Lisa opens the changing room door to reveal all the boys on the school's team— including Dennis— wearing all the dresses from her wardrobe. The game starts, and the school's team starts playing in dresses. Dennis immediately scores 2 goals and is "a hundred times happier than he had ever been". With Dennis playing in the team, the score increases from 6-0 to 6-6, and victory seems near— until one of the Maudlin Street players intentionally injures Dennis, leaving him lying on the ground in pain.

Dennis' father appears, much to Dennis's surprise, and starts cheering Dennis on. The game ends with a win for the school's team, and everyone celebrates. Mr. Hawtrey is still adamant on having Dennis expelled, but Dennis's father steps up and defends him from Mr. Hawtrey.

Later that day, Dennis returns the dress to Lisa and thanks her for "opening his eyes". For a moment, he contemplates confessing his profound affection for Lisa, but in the end, he does not and leaves it at "I'll tell you when I'm older". On the way home, Raj informs Dennis that Mr Hawtrey's sister, Miss Doris, rather than Mr Hawtrey himself, now buys the Telegraph and adds that there is "something funny about her".

Lisa and Dennis go to Raj's shop the next morning and find out that Miss Doris is actually Mr Hawtrey cross-dressing in a skirt. The two threaten to tell everyone about Mr Hawtrey's cross-dressing habits, unless Dennis is readmitted to the school. Mr Hawtrey gives in and agrees to reinstate Dennis.

Dennis, his father, and his brother get over the pain of the loss of Dennis’ mother, Dennis and Lisa stay good friends, and John starts to look out for his younger brother more.

In the BBC adaptation, it is Christmas, and Darvesh and his mother come over to Dennis' house. They ring the doorbell and Dennis' dad opens the door and lets them both in, but only Darvesh goes through. Darvesh's mother, Jaspreet Kaur, flirts with Dennis' dad, after which they kiss each other. They all spend Christmas together happily, having a great time.

== Characters ==
- Dennis Sims - A 12-year-old boy who lives with his single father following his mum abandoning the family
- John Sims – Dennis' 14-year-old brother who is also a student at Elm Forest School.
- Dad – Dennis and John's father, whose name is not given in the book. He works as a long-distance lorry driver.
- Darvesh Singh – Dennis' best friend, is student at Elm Forest School and in the football team.
- Jaspreet Kaur – Darvesh's mother.
- Lisa James – A 14-year-old girl who is a pupil at Elm Forest School.
- Ms. Windsor – A French teacher at Elm Forest School.
- Mac – a unusually large boy in Lisa's class at Elm Forest School who tries to invite "Denise" on a date, not believing "she" is actually Dennis. He does not appear in the film adaptation.
- Raj – Owner of a local newspaper shop.
- Mr Hawtrey – The principal of Elm Forest School, and a member of the State Council.
- Mr Norris - A PE teacher at Elm Forest School.
- Gareth Small – A 14-year-old boy in Lisa's class who is the captain of the football team.

== Reception ==
Reviewers and the press noted the book's resonance with Walliams's own cross-dressing. As a child, his sisters would dress him up, and he would often act as a female character in school plays. Philip Ardagh in the Guardian noted the novelty of Walliams's light-hearted approach to the themes, compared with treatments in earlier children's books on the subject like Terence Blacker's 2004 title Boy 2 Girl. Nicolette Jones in the Times praised Blake's illustrations and, though she called Walliams' writing "not the finest", noted "Everyone is on the side of freedom and tolerance by the end, for which the book must be applauded."

In September 2017, during the Australian Marriage Law Postal Survey, retailer Aldi was criticised in Australia by some customers for selling the book, while some customers defended the retailer. Aldi said that they would not remove the book from sale.

== Allusions ==
Dennis's father tells him "No more Small England, or whatever it is": a reference to a television programme previously co-written and co-performed by Walliams. French teacher Miss Windsor cuts short a school detention, hoping to get home in time to watch Neighbours, although in America this reference is changed to The Young and the Restless. On page 104, it is mentioned that Lisa has a purple dress she had copied from one she'd seen Kylie Minogue wear at an awards show.

== Publication history ==
The book was published in hardcover by HarperCollins in October 2008, with a paperback release scheduled for May 2009. Walliams and his comedy partner Matt Lucas recorded an audiobook of the story, also for HarperCollins, which was released in November 2008. HarperCollins were reported to have signed Walliams for a two-book deal.

In December 2025, HarperCollins, the novel's original publisher, dropped Walliams after an internal investigation into allegations of inappropriate behaviour towards women, which he strongly denies.

== Translations ==
In Spain, the novel was translated into Spanish by Rita da Costa and published by Montena in 2014 as La increíble historia de… El mago del balón (The Incredible Story of… the Football Wizard). Another Spanish edition published in Mexico the same year by the same publisher used a literal translation of the original title, El niño de los vestidos, but left the rest of the translation the same. The Galician translation, by Moisés Barcia, was published by Sushi Books in 2018 as O rapaz do vestido (The Boy in the Dress).

In a 2020 study, translation scholar Beatriz María Rodríguez compared how the two translations handle the novel's references to gender. She noted that the Galician translation kept the original title and preserved nearly all of the novel's gender-related nuances. However, the Spanish translation altered or dropped several gender-related nuances without apparent justification. For example, in the original English version, when the headmaster refuses to let Dennis play for the school football team, he calls him a "dress-wearing disgrace of a boy." The Galician version keeps the reference to the dress, while the Spanish version drops it and calls Dennis simply a "clown" ("mamarracho"), so the insult no longer shows that Dennis is being punished for wearing a dress. She concluded that changes like this weaken the novel's message that children should be free to dress as they wish without gender labels.

== Adaptations ==
=== Television film adaptation ===
A television film adaptation was produced for BBC One, and aired on Boxing Day 2014 at 6:55 pm. It continues to be repeated regularly on the CBBC Channel.

Filming began on 19 October 2014, according to Walliams' Official Twitter page. Casting for the film was later announced on 21 October 2014.

=== Stage musical adaptation ===
A stage musical adaption of the book was produced by the Royal Shakespeare Company in Stratford-upon-Avon for in winter 2019. The musical is adapted by Mark Ravenhill, features music and lyrics by Guy Chambers and Robbie Williams, and is directed by RSC artistic director Gregory Doran.
