= Ethan Dizon =

American actor

- Born: Ethan C. Dizon; 2002 (age 24); Los Angeles, California
- Occupation: Actor
- Years active: 2008–Current
- Notable work: The Inevitable Defeat of Mister & Pete

Ethan C. Dizon is an American actor, best known for playing Pete in The Inevitable Defeat of Mister & Pete. His most recent role was the character Brian "Tiny" McKeever, Peter Parker's classmate in the Marvel Cinematic Universe films Spider-Man: Homecoming and Avengers: Infinity War.

== Early life ==
Ethan C. Dizon was born in 2002 in Los Angeles, California, to an American mother of Chinese descent and a Filipino father. He is the great-grandson of well-known World War II veteran and U.S. postmaster Lim Poon Lee, and the grand-nephew of Chinese actress Chow Kwun-Ling. His mother is actress Corinne Chooey, and his two younger brothers are also actors.

== Career ==
In 2008, Dizon made his acting debut in the CBS comedy series How I Met Your Mother. He played a guest role in the series 'Til Death in 2009, and in the medical drama Grey's Anatomy in 2012. He also played the title role in the short film Paulie.

In 2013, Dizon starred as Pete in The Inevitable Defeat of Mister & Pete, acting alongside Skylan Brooks, Anthony Mackie and Jennifer Hudson; the film, directed by George Tillman Jr., was released on October 11, 2013, by Lionsgate Entertainment. For his performance, Dizon was highly praised by media and film critics. That same year, he also played the role of Ricky Irvine in the comedy-drama Bad Words.

In 2016, Dizon played the role of Kwan in the comedy Get a Job. In 2018, he attended the intensive California State Summer School for the Arts (CSSSA) as both a theater major and a member of Studio 5. While he has not acted since, except for a new production of Sammy Joins the Mafia mounted via Zoom, he is still active in the industry and looking for new roles.

== Filmography ==
=== Film ===
Year	Title	Role	Notes
2011	Bad Mom	Rod	TV film, first roles
2012	Prodigy Bully	Hugo Kim	TV film
2012	Paulie	Paulie	Short film
2013	The Inevitable Defeat of Mister & Pete	Pete	
2013	Bad Words	Ricky Irvine	
2015	Table 58	Kid	TV film
2016	Get a Job	Kwan	
2017	Spider-Man: Homecoming	Brian "Tiny" McKeever	
2018	Avengers: Infinity War	Brian "Tiny" McKeever	Most recent role
2022	Spider-Man: No Way Home	Brian "Tiny" McKeever	Extended cut of 2021 film; archive footage: post-credits scene

=== Television ===
Year	Title	Role	Notes
2008–2009	How I Met Your Mother	Ben	2 episodes
2009	'Til Death	Chung He	1 episode
2012	Grey's Anatomy	Sean	1 episode
2013	Sullivan & Son	Quan	1 episode
2013	Awkward	The Accountant	2 episodes
2013	Jimmy Kimmel Live!	Himself – Guest	2 episodes
2013	Made in Hollywood	Himself	1 episode
2014	Gortimer Gibbon's Life on Normal Street	Zao	1 episode
2014	About a Boy	Boy #3	1 episode
2014	The League	Classmate #1	1 episode
2015	Nicky, Ricky, Dicky & Dawn	Dougie	1 episode
2018	American Housewife	Zhang Tao	1 episode
