= Skylan Brooks =

American actor

- Born: February 12, 1999 (age 27); Torrance, California, United States
- Occupation: Actor
- Years active: 2008–present
- Notable work: The Inevitable Defeat of Mister & Pete
- Height: 1.83 m (6 ft 0 in)

Skylan Brooks (born February 12, 1999) is an American actor, best known for playing Mister in The Inevitable Defeat of Mister & Pete.

== Early life ==
Brooks was born in Torrance, California.

== Career ==
In 2013, Brooks played the title role of Mister in the drama film The Inevitable Defeat of Mister & Pete, which also starred Ethan Dizon, Anthony Mackie and Jennifer Hudson. The film, directed by George Tillman, Jr., was released on October 11, 2013 by Lionsgate Entertainment. Brooks was highly praised by media and film critics for his performance. He later played the role of Ra-Ra in the 2016 Netflix musical series The Get Down. In 2018, Brooks played Charles "Chubs" Meriwether in The Darkest Minds.

== Filmography ==
=== Film ===
Year	Title	Role	Notes
2008	The Van Pelt Family	Boy with Steering Wheel	Short film
2008	Seven Pounds	Choir Kid	
2008	Who's Boo?	Evan	Short film
2010	Our Family Wedding	Buddy Boyd	
2010	Ships Wrecked Cove	Carlton	Short film
2010	Stanley	Casey	Short film
2011	Duck	Emmanuel	Short film
2012	A Beautiful Soul	Young Andre Stevens	
2012	Noobz	Chomomma	
2012	General Education	Charles	
2013	The Inevitable Defeat of Mister & Pete	Mister	
2014	Oliver, Stoned.	Thomas	
2015	Southpaw	Hoppy	
2015	Reveille	Boy	Short film
2015	Montford Point Marines Honor	Jamal	Short film
2018	The Darkest Minds	Chubs	
2018	Bloom		Short film
2019	Boy Genius	Luke	
2020	Archenemy	Hamster	
2022	Outsiders	Jaylen Brown	

=== Television ===
Year	Title	Role	Notes
2009	iCarly	Danny Peterson	1 episode
2011	Childrens Hospital	Boy	1 episode
2013	Revealed	Himself	1 episode
2013	Chelsea Lately	Himself	1 episode
2013	Made in Hollywood	Himself	1 episode
2013	Jimmy Kimmel Live!	Himself	1 episode
2013	FTS Kids Radio Show	Special Guest	1 episode
2016	The Get Down	Ra-Ra Kipling	Lead role
2018–2020	Empire	Quincy	Recurring role

== Awards and nominations ==
Year!	Award!	Category!	Work	Result!	Ref.(s)
2014	Young Artist Award	Best Leading Young Actor in a Feature Film	The Inevitable Defeat of Mister & Pete	Nominated	
