= Andy Riley =

British TV screenwriter, cartoonist (born 1970)

- Born: 1970 (age 55–56); Aylesbury, Buckinghamshire, England
- Education: Pembroke College, Oxford
- Occupations: Author, cartoonist, screenwriter and television producer
- Writing career
- Period: 1993–present
- Genres: Comedy, adventure, science fiction

Andy Riley (born 1970) is a British author, cartoonist, and Emmy-winning screenwriter for TV and film.

== Early life ==
Riley was educated at Aylesbury Grammar School and Pembroke College, Oxford, where he read Modern History.

== Career ==
Riley has written and drawn many best-selling cartoon books, including The Book of Bunny Suicides (2003) and its sequels, and Great Lies To Tell Small Kids (2005). From 2002 until February 2010 he drew a weekly comic strip called Roasted in The Observer Magazine, a collection of which was released in book form in 2007. Riley also publishes the King Flashypants series of children's books.

With Kevin Cecil, his best friend since they attended Aylesbury Grammar School, he created and wrote the sitcoms Year of the Rabbit for Channel 4 and IFC, The Great Outdoors for BBC Four, Hyperdrive for BBC Two and Slacker Cats for the ABC Family Channel. Their other television work includes Veep (for which they each won an Emmy in 2015 in the Outstanding Comedy Series category), Black Books, the Comic Relief one-off special Robbie the Reindeer, for which he and Cecil won a BAFTA in 2000, Little Britain, Tracey Ullman's Show, Trigger Happy TV, So Graham Norton, Smack the Pony, The Armando Iannucci Shows, Harry and Paul, Big Bad World, Come Fly With Me, and Spitting Image. The Radio Four panel game they wrote with Jon Holmes and Tony Roche, The 99p Challenge, ran for five series from 2000.

They wrote for the Touchstone animated feature Gnomeo and Juliet, and its sequel Sherlock Gnomes.

Riley has co-written two TV adaptations of David Walliams books: Gangsta Granny and The Boy in the Dress.

== Screenwriting credits ==
Production	Notes	Broadcaster
The Good Sex Guide	Unknown episodes (1993)	ITV
Smith & Jones: One Night Stand	Television film (co-written with Mark Burton, Kevin Cecil, Simon Godley, Rory McGrath, John O'Farrell, Griff Rhys Jones and Mel Smith, 1994)	N/A
The Friday Night Armistice	Unknown episodes (1995)	BBC Two
Jack and Jeremy's Real Lives	Unknown episodes (1996) (additional material)	Channel 4
The Armstrong and Miller Show	Unknown episodes (1997)	Paramount Comedy Channel
Alexei Sayle's Merry-Go-Round	6 episodes (1998)	BBC Two
Big Train	"Episode #1.1" (1998) (additional material)	BBC Two
The Morwenna Banks Show	Unknown episodes (1998)	Channel 5
Hooves of Fire	Short film (co-written with Kevin Cecil and Richard Curtis, 1999)	BBC One; Fox Family Channel
The Nearly Complete and Utter History of Everything	Television film (co-written with Mark Burton and Kim Fuller, 1999)	BBC One
Harry Enfield's Brand Spanking New Show	Unknown episodes (2000)	Sky 1
Smack the Pony	7 episodes (2000–2001) (additional material)	Channel 4
Slacker Cats	Television film (co-written with Kevin Cecil, 2001)	ABC Family
TV to Go	Unknown episodes (2001)	BBC One
The Armando Iannucci Shows	8 episodes (co-written with Kevin Cecil, 2001)	Channel 4
Robbie the Reindeer in Legend of the Lost Tribe	Short film (co-written with Kevin Cecil, 2002)	BBC One
Black Books	8 episodes (2002, 2004)	Channel 4
Man Stroke Woman	"Episode #1.3" (co-written with Kevin Cecil, 2005)	BBC Three
Little Britain	8 episodes (2005–2006) (additional material)	BBC One
Hyperdrive	12 episodes (co-written with Kevin Cecil, 2005–2006)	BBC Two
Katy Brand's Big Ass Show	"Episode #2.2" (co-written with Kevin Cecil, 2007); "Episode #2.4" (co-written with Kevin Cecil, 2007)	ITV2
Slacker Cats	7 episodes (co-written with Kevin Cecil, 2007, 2009)	ABC Family
The Great Outdoors	3 episodes (co-written with Kevin Cecil, 2010)	BBC Four
The Armstrong & Miller Show	"Episode #2.1" (co-written with Kevin Cecil, 2009); "Episode #3.1" (co-written with Kevin Cecil, 2010); "Episode #3.4" (co-written with Kevin Cecil, 2010); "Episode #3.6" (co-written with Kevin Cecil, 2010)	BBC One
Come Fly with Me	6 episodes (2010–2011) (additional material)	BBC One
Ruddy Hell! It's Harry and Paul	"Episode #3.1" (co-written with Kevin Cecil, 2010) (additional material); "Episode #4.2" (co-written with Kevin Cecil, 2012) (additional material); "Episode #4.4" (co-written with Kevin Cecil, 2012) (additional material)	BBC Two
Gnomeo & Juliet	Feature film (co-written with Kelly Asbury, Mark Burton, Kevin Cecil, Emily Cook, Kathy Greenberg, Steve Hamilton Shaw, John R. Smith and Rob Sprackling, 2011)	N/A
Big Bad World	"Episode #1.6" (co-written with Kevin Cecil, 2013)	Comedy Central
Gangsta Granny	Television film (co-written with Kevin Cecil and David Walliams, 2013)	BBC One
The Boy in the Dress	Television film (co-written with Kevin Cecil and David Walliams, 2014)	BBC One
Veep	"Clovis" (co-written with Kevin Cecil, 2014); "Detroit" (co-written with Kevin Cecil, 2014); "East Wing" (co-written with Kevin Cecil, 2015); "B/ill" (co-written with Kevin Cecil, 2015)	HBO
Tracey Ullman's Show	6 episodes (co-written with Kevin Cecil, 2016–)	BBC One
Sherlock Gnomes	Feature film (co-written with Kevin Cecil, 2018)	Paramount Pictures
Seize Them!	Feature film (2024)	TBA
Beyond Paradise	Series 4 Episode 5 (co-written with Kevin Cecil, 2026)	BBC One

== Bibliography ==
Standalone Cartoon Books

- Roasted (2007)
- D.I.Y. Dentistry and Other Alarming Inventions (2008)
- Selfish Pigs (2009)
- Wine Makes Mummy Clever (2011)
- Beer Makes Daddy Strong (2011)
- Puppy Versus Kitten (2017)

Bunny Suicides

- The Book of Bunny Suicides (2003)
- Return of the Bunny Suicides (2005)
- Dawn of the Bunny Suicides (2010)

Lies to Tell Small Kids

- Great Lies to Tell Small Kids (2006)
- Loads More Lies to Tell Small Kids (2007)

King Flashypants

- King Flashypants and the Evil Emperor (2017)
- King Flashypants and the Creature from Crong (2018)
- King Flashypants and the Toys of Terror (2018)
- King Flashypants and the Boo-Hoo Witches (2018)
- King Flashypants and the Snowball of Doom (2018)

== Awards and nominations ==
Year	Award	Work	Category	Result	Reference
2012	Annie Award	Gnomeo & Juliet (shared with Kelly Asbury, Mark Burton, Kevin Cecil, Emily Cook, Kathy Greenberg, Steve Hamilton Shaw, John R. Smith and Rob Sprackling)	Writing in a Feature Production	Nominated	
2014	Online Film & Television Association Award	Veep	Best Writing in a Comedy Series	Won	
2015	Primetime Emmy Award	Veep	Outstanding Comedy Series	Won	
2015	Writers Guild of America Award	Veep	Comedy Series	Nominated	
2016	Writers Guild of America Award	Veep	Comedy Series	Won	
2016	Producers Guild of America Award	Veep, Season Four	Outstanding Producer of Episodic Television, Comedy	Nominated	
