= Evil Penguins =

Book by Elia Anie

Evil Penguins: When Cute Penguins Go Bad
- Author: Elia Anie
- Language: English
- Genre: Humor
- Publisher: Simon Spotlight Entertainment
- Publication date: August 5, 2008
- Publication place: United States
- Media type: Paperback
- Pages: 96 pages
- ISBN: 978-1-4169-6115-4
- OCLC: 180756603

Evil Penguins: When Cute Penguins Go Bad (2008) is the first published work by author/illustrator Elia Anie. It is a collection of dark humor cartoons in the style of The Book of Bunny Suicides and The Far Side.

== Overview ==
The cartoons depict penguins, a normally innocent animal, performing various acts of harassment, mayhem and evil. There are drawings of penguins leading revolts, giving SpongeBob a swirly, causing plagues, clubbing baby seals, killing Inuit while dressed as ninjas, and wreaking havoc in dozens of other ways. Some popular culture references are used, such as borrowing a concept from the movie A Clockwork Orange, while others make reference to major historical events.

Evil Penguins is published in (at least) the United States, Canada, the United Kingdom, Sweden, Italy, and Australia. At least two different cover designs are used, depending on the publishing country. To date, there has been an aggressive marketing campaign in England, including humans dressed up in penguin costumes and causing trouble for locals at the park, on the street corner, and in a bookstore.

As a dark humor cartoon book, Evil Penguins shares similarities with The Far Side and The Book of Bunny Suicides, including the use of animals, offbeat humor, and a general format of mostly single box cartoons.

In 2008, Evil Penguins was a bestselling cartoon humor book in the United Kingdom.

In 2009, the author released a follow-up work entitled Evil Cats.
