= Kelly Asbury =

American film director (1960–2020)

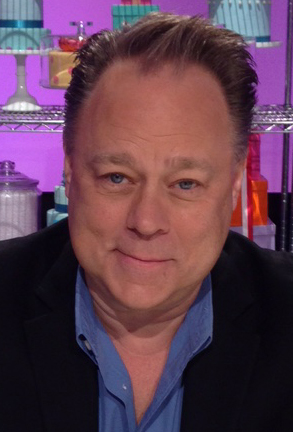
- Asbury in 2016
- Born: Kelly Adam Asbury; January 15, 1960; Beaumont, Texas, U.S.
- Died: June 26, 2020 (aged 60); Encino, California, U.S.
- Resting place: Forest Lawn Memorial Park, Hollywood Hills
- Education: Lamar University California Institute of the Arts
- Occupations: Film director; writer; voice actor; illustrator
- Years active: 1982–2019
- Employers: Walt Disney Animation Studios (1983–1995, 2009–2013); DreamWorks Animation (1995–2009)
- Notable work: Spirit: Stallion of the Cimarron; Shrek 2 Gnomeo & Juliet; Smurfs: The Lost Village; UglyDolls
- Spouses: Loretta Weeks (m. 1990; div. 2006) Jacquie Boggs (m. 2011)

Kelly Adam Asbury (January 15, 1960 – June 26, 2020) was an American film director, writer, voice actor, and illustrator. He was best known for directing the animated films Spirit: Stallion of the Cimarron (2002), Shrek 2 (2004), Gnomeo & Juliet (2011), Smurfs: The Lost Village (2017), and UglyDolls (2019).

== Early life ==
Asbury was born on January 15, 1960, in Beaumont, Texas, the son of Josephine Margaret (Lebeouf) and Donald Leslie Asbury. His father Donald died from cancer when Asbury was 12. He attended Lamar University for two years before transferring to the renowned California Institute of the Arts in 1980, where he studied animation and filmmaking.

== Career ==
Asbury got his start at Walt Disney Feature Animation from 1983 to 1995, and contributed storyboards for several animated films including The Little Mermaid and Beauty and the Beast, as well as Pixar's first feature film, Toy Story. In 1993, he was the assistant art director on Tim Burton's The Nightmare Before Christmas.

In 1995, he began working for DreamWorks Animation, and directed two Academy Award-nominated feature films, Spirit: Stallion of the Cimarron (2002) and Shrek 2 (2004). In addition to directing, he provided some of the extra voices in Shrek 2 and Shrek the Third.

He directed and co-wrote the animated film Gnomeo & Juliet (2011), for which he also provided the voices of the tiny Red Goon Gnomes. He was nominated for two Annie Awards for directing and co-writing that film.

In 2003, he wrote a non-fiction book, Dummy Days, a biography of five 20th-century ventriloquists. He wrote and illustrated twelve children's books, including Rusty's Red Vacation, Bonnie's Blue House, and Yolanda's Yellow School.

In mid-2011 to mid-2012, Asbury briefly returned to Disney to contribute storyboards to Wreck-It Ralph and Frozen. His final directing credits were Smurfs: The Lost Village for Sony Pictures Animation and UglyDolls for STX Entertainment.

=== Unrealized projects ===
- Shrek – In 1997, Dreamworks hired Asbury to co-direct the film adaptation of the children's book Shrek! alongside Andrew Adamson, which would have been his directorial debut. He left production of the film a year later in order to work on Spirit: Stallion of the Cimarron and was replaced by Vicky Jenson, but remained as a story artist and received special thanks on the finished film. He later co-directed its sequel, Shrek 2.
- The Thief of Always – In 2006, following the success of Shrek 2, it was announced that Asbury was hired to write and direct a live-action film based on Clive Barker's children's book The Thief of Always, for 20th Century Fox and Seraphim Films. The film would have been Asbury's first foray into live-action filmmaking, but the rights would revert to Barker.
- Pooch Café – In 2011, Asbury was appointed by Sony Pictures Animation to write a new draft for a film adaptation of the Pooch Café comic strip.
- Will Gallows and the Snake-Bellied Troll – In 2011, following the success of Gnomeo and Juliet, Asbury was hired by Rocket Pictures to write and direct a live-action/animated film based on the children's book Will Gallows and the Snake-Bellied Troll. The film would have been Asbury's first foray into live-action filmmaking after his attempt at The Thief of Always failed.
- Kazorn & The Unicorn – In 2012, Deadline reported that Asbury was in talks with Sony Pictures Animation to make an animated fantasy film titled Kazorn & The Unicorn. It would have followed the adventures of a young man and a unicorn as he seeks to locate a powerful weapon and prove his worth to his true love. Lloyd Taylor was writing the screenplay. Sam Raimi, Josh Donen, and Russell Hollander were producing the film. Troy Quane (Spies in Disguise, Nimona) was later hired to co-direct the film with Asbury, but production of the film was suspended and eventually canceled.
- Horacio 3D – In 2013, Asbury began writing a Brazilian animated film based on the Monica's Gang character Horacio, originally scheduled for a 2017 release. According to animator Fábio Mendes, Asbury was intended to direct the film. But at the time of Asbury's death, nothing was released about the project.

== Death ==
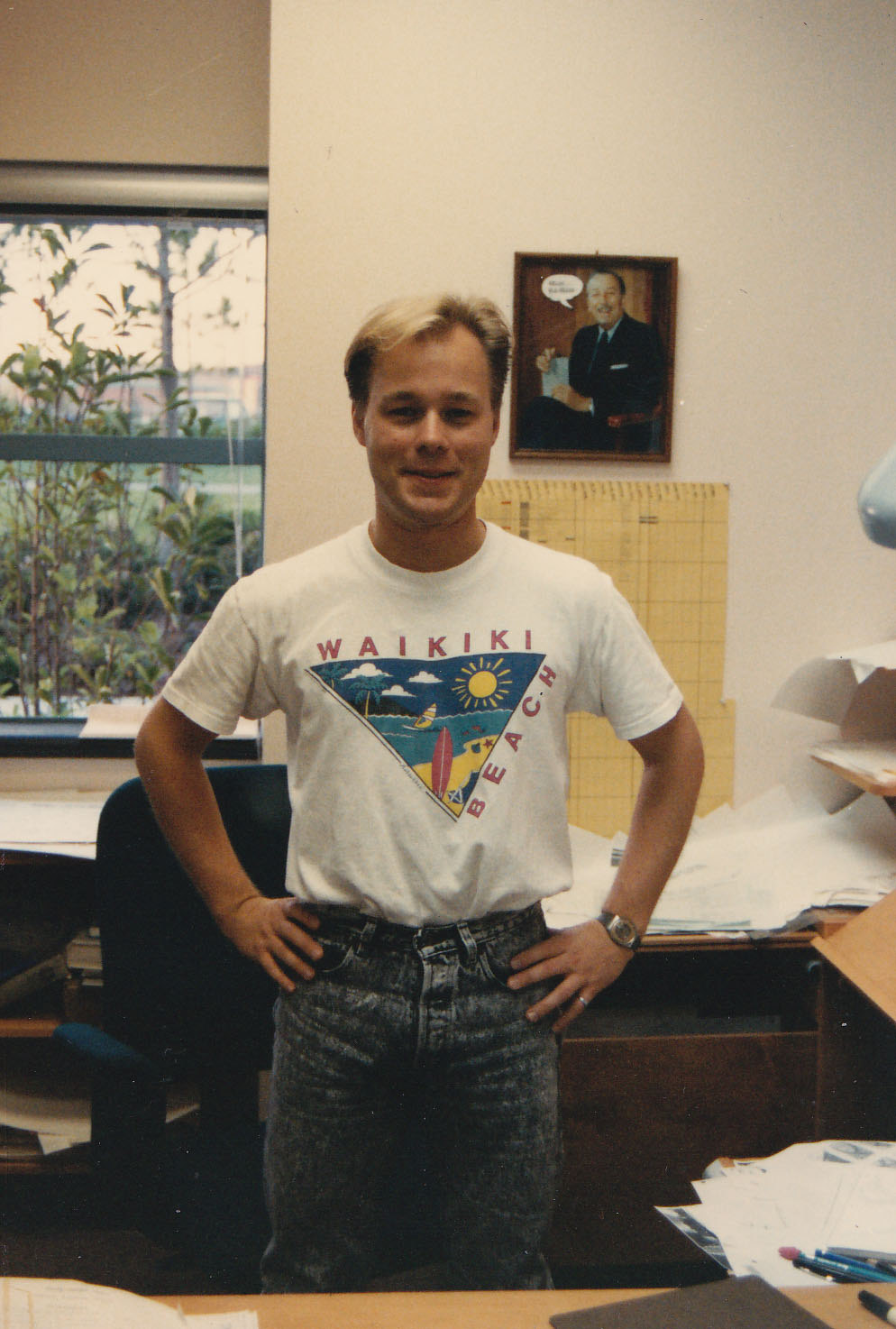
Kelly Asbury in Florida, Summer 1989

Asbury died of abdominal cancer on June 26, 2020, in his home, Encino, Los Angeles, at age 60. He was cremated, his ashes were buried at Forest Lawn Memorial Park, Hollywood Hills. He was featured in the In Memoriam section of the 93rd Academy Awards, and Spirit Untamed was dedicated to his memory.

== Filmography ==
Year	Title	Notes
1984	The Littles	Storyboards (8 episodes)
1985	The Black Cauldron	Inbetween artist
1987	Sport Goofy in Soccermania	Short; Layout Artist
1989	The Little Mermaid	Visual development artist
1990	The Rescuers Down Under	Character designer, storyboard artist, visual development
1990	Roller Coaster Rabbit	Short; Art Director
1991	Beauty and the Beast	Story, visual development artist
1993	The Nightmare Before Christmas	Assistant art director
1995	Toy Story	Story artist
1996	Quack Pack	Storyboard: Ducky Dearest
1996	James and the Giant Peach	Storyboard supervisor with Joe Ranft
1996	Disney's Animated Storybook: Toy Story	Video game Additional story and writing
1998	Histeria!	Storyboard artist: The American Revolution
1998	The Prince of Egypt	Artistic Supervisor: story with Lorna Cook and Ronnie del Carmen
2000	Chicken Run	Additional story artist
2001	Shrek	Story artist, special thanks
2002	Spirit: Stallion of the Cimarron	Director with Lorna Cook [directorial debut]
2004	Shrek 2	Director with Andrew Adamson and Conrad Vernon, voices: Page, Elf, and Nobleman, ADR group
2005	100 Greatest Cartoons	Documentary; Himself
2007	Shrek the Third	Voices: Master of Ceremonies and Fiddlesworth, special thanks
2008	Kung Fu Panda	Additional story artist
2008	Madagascar: Escape 2 Africa	Additional story artist
2009	I'm No Dummy	Documentary; Himself
2009	The BackStage Pass	TV special Himself
2011	Gnomeo and Juliet	Director, screenwriter, story, voices: Red Goon Gnomes
2011	Made in Hollywood	Himself (1 episode)
2011	Jeff Dunham: Birth of a Dummy	TV special Himself
2012	Made in Hollywood: Teen Edition	Himself (1 episode)
2012	Wreck-It Ralph	Story artist
2013	Frozen	Additional story artist
2014	Lennon or McCartney	Documentary short Himself
2014	Achmed Saves America	Original character designer
2017	Smurfs: The Lost Village	Director, voice: Nosey Smurf
2017	Cake Wars	Himself: guest judge
2018	Sherlock Gnomes	Based on characters, creative consultant, storyboard artist, voices: Goons
2019	UglyDolls	Director, voices: Gibberish Cat, Oliver, and Chef
2019	The Addams Family	Story consultant, special thanks
2021	Spirit Untamed	Dedicated

== Bibliography ==
- Rusty's Red Vacation (1997)
- Bonnie's Blue House (1997)
- Yolanda's Yellow School (1997)
- Thanksgiving Parade (2000; illustrations only)
- Turkey Time (2000; illustrations only)
- Where is Snowy's Nose (2000)
- Frankensquare (2001)
- Witch Dot (2001)
- Candy Corn (2001)
- Autumn Walk (2003; illustrations only)
- Winter Walk (2003; illustrations only)
- Dummy Days: America's Favorite Ventriloquists from Radio and Early TV (2003)
- Wild Witches' Ball (2004; illustration only)
