= Legends of Chamberlain Heights =

American animated television series

- Genre: Comedy
- Created by: Brad Ableson; Mike Clements; Quinn Hawking; Josiah Johnson; Michael Starrbury
- Written by: Issac Gonzalez; Quinn Hawking; Lee House; Joshua Krist; Eric Lev; Sarah Afkami; Malik S Megan Neuringer; Devon Shepard; Rodney Barnes; Grant DeKernion; Carl Jones; R.J. Barnes; Phillip Walker
- Directed by: Brad Ableson; Ashley J. Long; L. Todd Myers; Erik Kuska; Kevin Lofton; Stephen Reis
- Starring: Quinn Hawking; Josiah Johnson; Michael Starrbury; Tiffany Haddish
- Theme music composer: Brad Ableson; Erykah Badu; Frank Ciampi
- Composer: Frank Ciampi
- Country of origin: United States
- Original language: English
- No. of seasons: 2
- No. of episodes: 20

Production
- Executive producers: Brad Ableson; Quinn Hawking; Josiah Johnson; Michael Starrbury; Devon Shepard; Scott Greenberg; Joel Kuwahara
- Producers: Quinn Hawking; Josiah Johnson; Grant DeKernion
- Running time: 22 minutes
- Production companies: Comedy Partners; Bento Box Entertainment; Running with Scissors; TrueStarr Society of Ninjas Incorporated

Original release
- Network: Comedy Central
- Release: September 14, 2016 – August 20, 2017

Legends of Chamberlain Heights is an American adult animated sitcom created by Brad Ableson, Mike Clements, Quinn Hawking, Josiah Johnson, and Michael Starrbury. The series aired on Comedy Central from September 14, 2016, to August 20, 2017. On October 7, 2017, Comedy Central canceled the series after two seasons.

== Premise ==
The series focuses on three teenagers Jamal, Milk, and Grover. They are benchwarmers on the high school basketball team, but legends in their own minds.

== Cast ==
- Josiah Johnson as
  - Grover Cummings, one of the three main protagonists and brother of Malik and Montrel.
  - Milton "Milk" Chambers, one of the main protagonists and a black man in the body of a white man.
  - Shea Butta, Montrel's best friend, or at least the one he hangs out with the most, who usually tags along with him.
- Quinn Hawking as
  - Jamal Anderson, one of the main protagonists with an overweight look and a very high-pitched voice.
  - Shamal Anderson, Jamal's twin sister and equivalent who has a crush on Milk, but Milk finds her repulsive and calls her "a dickless version of Jamal".
  - Rodrigo, one of Malik's friends who helps him sell drugs to people.
- Michael Starrbury as
  - Malik Cummings, the intelligent younger brother of Grover and Montrel, and a father-like role in the family.
- Jay Pharoah as
  - Montrel Cummings, the older brother of Grover and Malik and a retired basketball player.
  - Randy, the leaders of the jocks and a bully to Grover, Milk and Jamal.
- Jamie Kennedy as
  - Dave "Uncle Joey" Couliers, Milk's step-dad
  - Officer Jaime Kennedy
- Carl Jones as
  - Coach Bundy, the short-tempered basketball coach and gym teacher at School.
- Tiffany Haddish as
  - Cindy, the head cheerleader, Randy's off-and-on girlfriend and Grover's love interest.
- Poochie Jackson as
  - Medina, an extremely overweight but aggressive girl and Jamal's on-and-off girlfriend.
    - Erykah Badu provides Medina's singing voice

=== Recurring characters ===
- Lavell Crawford as:
  - LeDante, a student at Duncan High School
  - Jarvis "Jank Eyed Jarvis" Mitchell, a student at Duncan High School
- Elise Marie Dubois as:
  - Hunny Chambers, the mother of Milk and the wife of Uncle Joey
  - Ms. Noble, one of the teachers at Duncan High
- Tisha Campbell-Martin as:
  - Patricia "Cracky" Sheldon, a student and cheerleader at Duncan High

=== Notable guest stars ===
- Tupaquia (voiced by Richie Loco) appears in S1's "The Legend of Tupaquia".
- Derek Fisher / Coach Fisher (voiced by Piotr Michael) appears in S2's "Coach Fishy".
- MC Eiht (voiced by himself) appears in S1's "Inspired by Isis".
- Brad Deekenmouf (voiced by Tom Kenny) appears in S1's "Inspired by Isis".

== Episodes ==
Season	Episodes	Originally released	
Season	Episodes	First released	Last released
1	10	September 14, 2016	December 7, 2016
2	10	June 18, 2017	August 20, 2017

=== Season 1 (2016) ===
No. overall	No. in season	Title	Directed by	Written by	Original release date	Prod. code	US viewers (millions)
1	1	"Jamallies"	Brad Ableson	Michael Starrbury	September 14, 2016	101	0.672
2	2	"Child Please"	L. Todd Myers	Quinn Hawking & Josiah Johnson	September 21, 2016	102	0.484
3	3	"Come out to Play"	Ashley J. Long	Isaac Gonzalez	September 28, 2016	103	0.615
4	4	"Inspired by Isis"	L. Todd Myers	Michael Starrbury	October 12, 2016	104	0.630
5	5	"The Legend of Tupaquia"	L. Todd Myers	Carl Jones	October 19, 2016	105	0.468
6	6	"Class President"	Ashley J. Long	Malik Sanon	October 26, 2016	106	0.438
7	7	"Cane and Disabled"	Ashley J. Long	Joshua Krist & Eric Lev	November 9, 2016	107	0.650
8	8	"End of Days"	L. Todd Myers	Grant DeKernion	November 16, 2016	108	0.577
9	9	"More Than a Video Game"	Ashley J. Long	Lee House	November 30, 2016	109	0.447
10	10	"25th Hour"	L. Todd Myers	Devon Shepard & Sarah Afkami	December 7, 2016	110	0.628

=== Season 2 (2017) ===
No. overall	No. in season	Title	Directed by	Written by	Original release date	Prod. code	US viewers (millions)
11	1	"The G-Word"	Erik Kuska	Joshua Krist & Eric Lev	June 18, 2017	201	0.191
12	2	"Chocolate Milk"	Kevin Lofton	Phillip Walker	June 25, 2017	202	0.173
13	3	"Coach Fishy"	Ashley J. Long	Quinn Hawking & Josiah Johnson	July 2, 2017	203	0.210
14	4	"Just Say No to Cracky"	Ashley J. Long	R.J. Barnes	July 9, 2017	204	0.168
15	5	"Hurricane Jermaine"	Erik Kuska & Brad Ableson	Quinn Hawking & Josiah Johnson	July 16, 2017	205	0.229
16	6	"Confederate Flags of Our Fathers"	Kevin Lofton	Devon Shepard, Joshua Krist & Eric Lev	July 23, 2017	206	0.195
17	7	"My Father the Zero"	Erik Kuska	Devon Shepard, Rodney Barnes & Issac Gonalez	July 30, 2017	207	0.252
18	8	"Party Over Here, Fuck You Over There"	Stephen Reis	Devon K. Shepard & Rodney Barnes	August 6, 2017	208	0.236
19	9	"Hom-coming"	Kevin Lofton	Issac Gonzalez	August 13, 2017	209	0.262
20	10	"Legends of Lock-Up"	Ashley J. Long	Lee House	August 20, 2017	210	0.162

== Kobe Bryant helicopter crash ==
The series gained mainstream attention in early 2020 due to the episode "End of Days" which included a scene that depicted NBA star Kobe Bryant crawling out of a crashed helicopter before it explodes. After the real Bryant was killed in a helicopter crash in January 2020, the episode was removed from the Comedy Central website, and the creators of the show asked people to refrain from sharing the clip on social media out of respect for Bryant.
