= The Inevitable Defeat of Mister & Pete =

2013 film by George Tillman Jr.

- Theatrical release poster
- Directed by: George Tillman Jr.
- Written by: Michael Starrbury
- Produced by: Jana Edelbaum; Rachel Cohen; George Tillman Jr.; Robert Teitel
- Starring: Skylan Brooks; Ethan Dizon; Jordin Sparks; Jeffrey Wright; Adewale Akinnuoye-Agbaje; Anthony Mackie; Jennifer Hudson
- Cinematography: Reed Morano
- Edited by: Jamie Kirkpatrick
- Music by: Alicia Keys; Mark Isham
- Production companies: iDeal Partners; State Street Pictures; Floren Shieh Productions; Archer Gray Productions; Cherry Sky Films; Whitest Pouring Films; AKW Productions; Aldamisa International
- Distributed by: Codeblack Films
- Release dates: January 25, 2013 (Sundance); October 11, 2013 (United States)
- Running time: 108 minutes
- Country: United States
- Language: English
- Box office: $506,303

The Inevitable Defeat of Mister & Pete is a 2013 American drama film directed and co-produced by George Tillman Jr. and written by Michael Starrbury. It stars Skylan Brooks and Ethan Dizon in the title roles, with Jordin Sparks, Jeffrey Wright, Adewale Akinnuoye-Agbaje, Anthony Mackie, and Jennifer Hudson in supporting roles. It follows two inner city boys who are left to fend for themselves over the summer after their mothers are taken away by the authorities.

The film had its world premiere at the Sundance Film Festival on January 25, 2013, and was theatrically released in the United States on October 11, 2013, by Codeblack Films and Lionsgate. It received positive reviews from critics, who praised Tillman's direction, Starrbury's screenplay, and the performances of Brooks and Dizon. It was nominated for Outstanding Independent Motion Picture at the 45th NAACP Image Awards and for Best First Screenplay (for Starrbury) at the 29th Independent Spirit Awards. The film also garnered nominations for Best Director, Best Screenplay, Adapted or Original, and Best Breakthrough Performance, Male (for Brooks) at the 14th Black Reel Awards.

== Plot ==
Set in a gritty Brooklyn housing project, the film follows 13-year-old Mister (Skylan Brooks), a smart, tough, and fiercely independent boy with dreams of becoming an actor. He lives with his mother, Gloria (Jennifer Hudson), a heroin-addicted sex worker who often neglects and abuses him. One day, during a police raid, Gloria is arrested, leaving Mister to fend for himself for what he assumes is only a couple weeks, given her track record, but presumes she’s dead after hearing that she got out after being held for 2 weeks, and then not seeing her for 3 weeks.

Alongside Mister is 9-year-old Pete (Ethan Dizon), a shy Korean-American boy whose mother is also a heroin addicted sex worker. After Pete's mother disappears, Mister reluctantly takes him in. The two boys, both neglected by the adults in their lives, are suddenly left alone for the summer—with no money, no electricity, and no food.

Fearful of being taken to a group home or foster care, Mister avoids the authorities and keeps their situation a secret. The boys struggle to survive day-to-day: searching for food, dodging Child Protective Services, and navigating dangerous neighbors, street criminals, and heatwaves. Throughout it all, Mister keeps his sights on an upcoming audition for a TV acting role—his potential escape from poverty.

As the summer drags on, their situation becomes more dire. They face theft, humiliation, and hunger. Pete soon becomes sick. Despite his anger and bravado, Mister begins to show real care for Pete, forming a bond that becomes the emotional core of the story. Pete, in turn, looks up to Mister as his only protector.

Eventually, Pete is caught by the police and sent to a juvenile detention center. Mister gets so desperate he ends up trying to work for Kris, his mom's local drug dealer, only to be turned away, though with surprising sympathy. Mister is soon attacked by the convenience store clerk he'd had multiple hostile encounters with, but is rescued by police and incarcerated soon after when CPS determines he's been abandoned.

At the juvenile detention center, Mister reunites with Pete, and starts protecting him from the other juveniles there. A few weeks pass and Gloria is seen alive and through rehab for the past months without his knowledge, where she goes to try and retrieve her son. She finds out that he was never retrieved by CPS until a few weeks ago, assuming that they collected him after she was arrested since she never checked with the detention center, which left her finding out by the agent she spoke to that he had been fending for himself, claiming that she couldn’t face him again until she got clean. Heartbroken by this additional failure as his mother, she expenses a nuisance of determination to finally be able to be a mother to him.

Mister and Pete see Gloria talking to the agent, whereupon they both realize that they’re gonna be separated again. Mister tells Pete to be strong and look after himself with the promise that they’ll see each other again (left ambiguous for the audience). Mister reunites with his mother. She twice apologizes to him, and he reluctantly forgives her. The film ends with Mister starting the new school year with renewed determination, and writes a paper about his entire summer experience.

In a deleted scene, Mister and Gloria return to the juvenile detention center to pick up Pete. When Pete sees Mister, they embrace each other, happy to be reunited.

== Cast ==
- Skylan Brooks as Mister
- Ethan Dizon as Pete
- Jennifer Hudson as Gloria
- Adewale Akinnuoye-Agbaje as Sergeant Pike
- Jordin Sparks as Alice
- Anthony Mackie as Kris
- Jeffrey Wright as Henry
- Julito McCullum as Dip Stick
- Joseph Adams as Mr. Carey
- Nikkieli DeMone as Officer Redd
- Joey Auzenne as Officer Duckworth
- Kate Buddeke as Neighbor Lady
- Adriane Lenox as Group Home Lady
- Marcus Carl Franklin as College Kid
- Rob Morgan as Cuffed Man Curtis
- Rege Lewis as B-Ball
- Martha Millan as Pete's Mom
- Adam Trese as Alice's Boyfriend

== Production ==
In July 2012, it was announced that Jennifer Hudson, Jordin Sparks, Jeffrey Wright, and Anthony Mackie had been cast in The Inevitable Defeat of Mister and Pete. George Tillman Jr. would direct the film from a screenplay by Michael Starrbury, with iDeal Partners' Rachel Cohen and Jana Edelbaum producing alongside State Street Pictures' Robert Teitel and Tillman. Principal photography began on July 23, 2012, in Brooklyn, New York.

== Release ==
The Inevitable Defeat of Mister & Pete premiered at the Sundance Film Festival on January 25, and Lionsgate's Codeblack Films acquired U.S. distribution rights to the film in May 2013. It was given a limited theatrical release in the United States on October 11, 2013. It was then released on DVD on February 4, 2014, by Lionsgate Home Entertainment.

== Reception ==
=== Box office ===
The Inevitable Defeat of Mister & Pete made $260,000 from 147 theaters in its opening weekend, an average of $1,769 per venue. The film ultimately grossed $494,608 in the United States and Canada, and $11,695 in other territories, for a worldwide total of $506,303.

=== Critical response ===
On the review aggregator website Rotten Tomatoes, 84% of 38 critics' reviews are positive, with an average rating of 6.9/10. The website's consensus reads: "The Inevitable Defeat of Mister & Pete uses its compelling streetwise setting — and powerful performances from its young leads — to offer a refreshing twist on the coming-of-age formula." Metacritic, which uses a weighted average, assigned the film a score of 61 out of 100, based on 16 critics, indicating "generally favorable" reviews.

Manohla Dargis of The New York Times wrote, "There are times in The Inevitable Defeat of Mister & Pete when the emotions it stirs up are so naked and unembarrassed that it feels as if you've entered a cinematic time machine back to the silent era." Dargis also commented that Tillman "does lovely work here, particularly with the actors, even if his insistent ebullience can feel like a sales pitch."

Michael O'Sullivan of The Washington Post highlighted the performances of Brooks and Dizon, feeling that they "outshine their older colleagues" and "carry the weight of the film on their bony shoulders, with Brooks bearing the lion's share of the acting challenges."

Betsy Sharkey of the Los Angeles Times called the film "a moving bit of mischief and mayhem that will break your heart, give you hope, make you laugh, possibly cry" and opined, "Mister and Pete are the film's secret weapon, richly drawn characters so well acted that they go a long way to overshadow its failings."

John Anderson of Variety remarked, "A pair of precociously charming perfs and a gritty sense of street can't prevent The Inevitable Defeat of Mister and Pete from wading into soggy sentiment. […] The pic simply moves from one strife-filled episode to another."

David Rooney of The Hollywood Reporter stated, "The big problem here is that not much happens in the protracted midsection. Tillman and Starrbury fail to instill dramatic forward motion, so the film idles for much of its running time, relying on the not inconsiderable charms of young actors Brooks and Dizon."

Nathan Rabin of The Dissolve wrote, "The Inevitable Defeat Of Mister & Pete is on sure footing when it focuses on the sorrowful plight of its protagonists, particularly Brooks, who delivers a performance rich in anger, sadness, and confusion, but devoid of sentimentality. […] But even though the grubby street melodrama on the periphery sometimes rings false, and the filmmakers sometime overreach, the film's core feels true."

Peter Sobczynski of RogerEbert.com gave the film 2 out of 4 stars and noted, "For the most part, however, the film is just never quite as powerful or moving as it clearly wants to be, and though it tries to avoid mawkishness throughout, it winds up succumbing to it."

Eric Kohn of IndieWire gave the film a grade of "C+" and opined, "Starrbury's screenplay lacks a cohesive means of channeling their conundrum into an involving dramatic arc, so that by the time the movie arrives at the apex of its dramatic incidents, they've been anticipated for so long that the finale comes across as an afterthought. While not without its touching moments, Mister and Pete is inevitably defeated by its own good intentions."

=== Accolades ===
Year	Award	Category	Recipient(s)	Result	Ref.
2014	Young Artist Award	Best Leading Young Actor in a Feature Film	Skylan Brooks	Nominated	

== See also ==
- List of hood films
