= Colin in Black & White =

2021 television series

- Promotional poster
- Genre: Drama
- Created by: Ava DuVernay; Colin Kaepernick
- Starring: Jaden Michael; Nick Offerman; Mary-Louise Parker
- Narrated by: Colin Kaepernick
- Country of origin: United States
- Original language: English
- No. of episodes: 6

Production
- Executive producers: Ava DuVernay; Colin Kaepernick; Paul Garnes
- Cinematography: Matthew J. Lloyd
- Editor: Jessica Hernández
- Running time: 27–35 minutes
- Production company: ARRAY Filmworks

Original release
- Network: Netflix
- Release: October 29, 2021

Colin in Black & White is an American drama television limited series that premiered on Netflix on October 29, 2021.

In advance of the series premiere, the pilot episode received a preview screening in the Primetime program at the 2021 Toronto International Film Festival.

== Premise ==
The show is a dramatization of athlete Colin Kaepernick's teenage years and the experiences that led him to become an activist.

== Cast ==
- Colin Kaepernick as Narrator (Voice)
- Jaden Michael as Colin Kaepernick
- Mary-Louise Parker as Teresa Kaepernick
- Nick Offerman as Rick Kaepernick
- Mace Coronel as Jake

== Episodes ==
No.	Title	Directed by	Written by	Original release date
1	"Cornrows"	Ava DuVernay	Teleplay by : Michael Starrbury; Story by : Ava DuVernay & Colin Kaepernick	October 29, 2021
2	"Quarterbackin'"	Sheldon Candis	Evan Ball	October 29, 2021
3	"Road Trip"	Robert Townsend	Teleplay by : Teri Schaffer & Raynelle Swilling; Story by : Natasha R. Trotter	October 29, 2021
4	"The Decision"	Robert Townsend	Josiah Johnson	October 29, 2021
5	"Crystal"	Angel Kristi Williams	Teri Schaffer & Raynelle Swilling	October 29, 2021
6	"Dear Colin"	Kenny Leon	Teleplay by : Michael Starrbury; Story by : Josiah Johnson & Michael Starrbury	October 29, 2021

== Reception ==
The review aggregator website Rotten Tomatoes reported a 79% based on 39 critic reviews. The website's critics consensus reads, "Black & White's clunky format fumbles the fundamentals of storytelling, but this hybrid series nonetheless scores a touchdown in conveying Colin Kaepernick's truth, even if the reality is absent." Metacritic, which uses a weighted average, assigned a score of 71 out of 100 based on 18 critics, indicating "generally favorable reviews".

Kristen Baldwin of Entertainment Weekly gave the series a B and described the series as "an uneven but ultimately edifying portrayal of the young athlete's coming of age as a biracial boy growing up in a predominantly white world."

=== Accolades ===
It was nominated for a Peabody Award in 2022.
