= Blade (unproduced film) =

Unproduced Marvel Studios film

Blade is an unproduced American superhero film based on the Marvel Comics character Blade, in development at Marvel Studios from 2019 to 2026. It was intended to be distributed by Walt Disney Studios Motion Pictures as an installment in the Marvel Cinematic Universe (MCU), and a reboot of the Blade film series. Mahershala Ali was attached to star as the title character.

Marvel Studios regained the film rights for Blade by July 2011, following the earlier film series from New Line Cinema. Ali approached Marvel Studios about the character in February 2019, and the film and his casting were announced at San Diego Comic-Con that July; Ali first made a voice-only cameo as Blade in the MCU film Eternals (2021). Active development began in 2020, but the film soon entered development hell. Bassam Tariq and Yann Demange were attached as directors at different times over the years, while Stacy Osei-Kuffour, Beau DeMayo, Ben Sokolowski, Michael Starrbury, Nic Pizzolatto, Michael Green, and Eric Pearson all worked on different versions of the script. The film's release date was pushed back numerous times before Disney removed Blade from its release calendar in October 2024. The delays were attributed to the 2023 Hollywood labor disputes, creative differences between the studio and Ali, and shifting priorities at Disney and Marvel. By July 2026, Ali had moved on from the role and the film was believed to have been canceled.

During the course of the film's development, two alternate versions of Blade appeared in the MCU via the multiverse: Wesley Snipes reprised his role from the New Line series in the film Deadpool & Wolverine (2024); and Blade Knight, combining the character with Moon Knight, was voiced by Todd Williams and animated with the likeness of Ali in the first season of the animated series Marvel Zombies (2025).

== Early development and announcement ==
At San Diego Comic-Con (SDCC) in July 2011, Marvel Entertainment's chief creative officer (CCO) Joe Quesada confirmed that Marvel Studios had re-acquired the film rights to the Marvel Comics character Blade from New Line Cinema, which produced a film trilogy starring Wesley Snipes as the character from 1998 to 2004. Marvel had a working script for a new Blade film from its in-house writing program by May 2013.

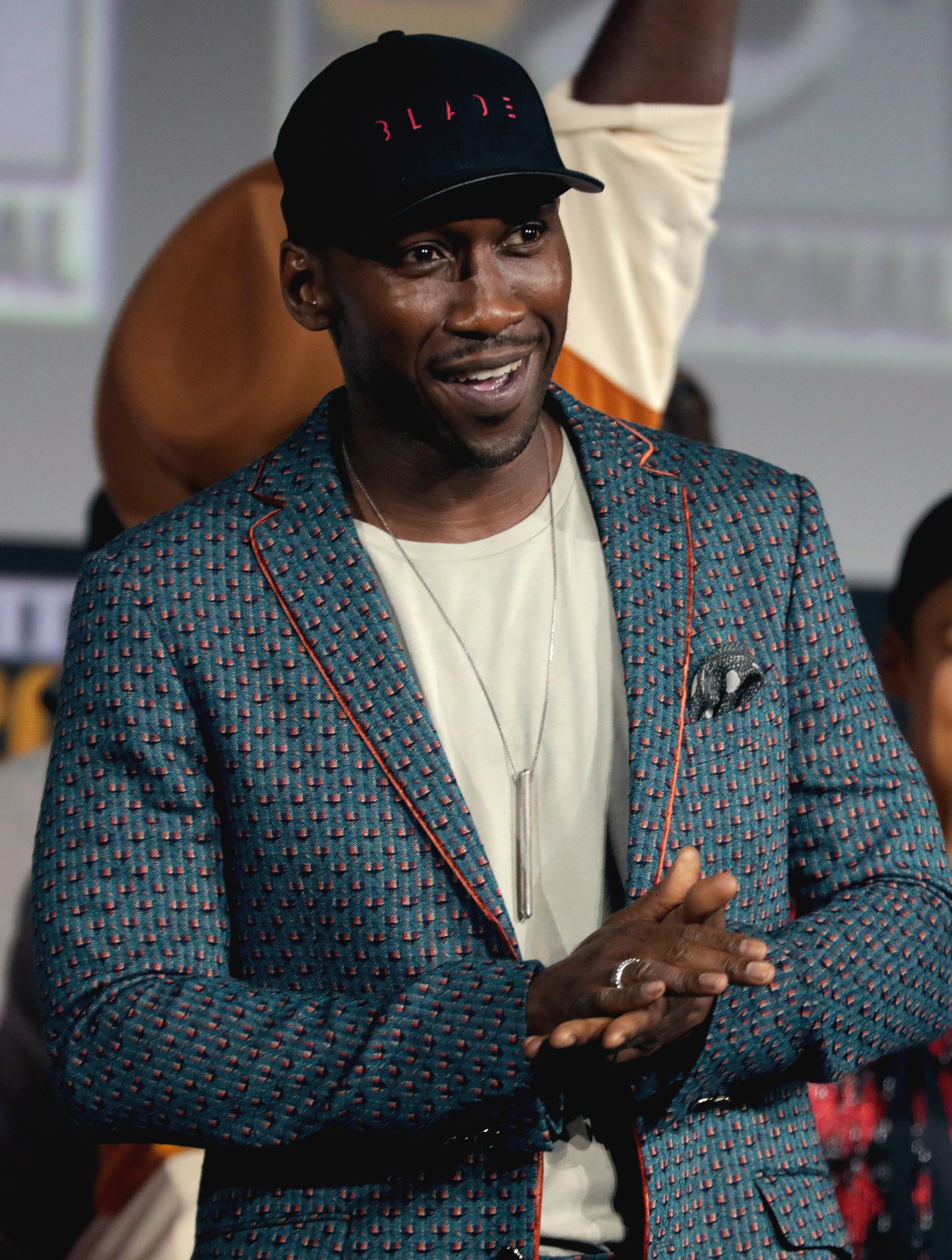
Mahershala Ali announcing Blade at the 2019 San Diego Comic-Con

In July 2015, Snipes said he hoped to reprise the role in any future film and had discussed this with Marvel. After hearing of a potential Blade reboot, actor Mahershala Ali had discussions about it with Marvel starting at the end of September 2016, on the same day that the first season of Marvel's Netflix series Luke Cage (2016) was released; Ali portrayed Cornell "Cottonmouth" Stokes in that season. Marvel Television wanted to develop a new series featuring Blade, but Ali was interested in moving from Marvel's television side to a film. He was drawn to Blade because of Snipes's portrayal and was interested in exploring the role's darker side, in contrast to the lighter tone of more recent superhero films. The following month, Marvel Studios president Kevin Feige said there were opportunities for Blade to appear in a Marvel Cinematic Universe (MCU) film or television series, similar to the character Ghost Rider being added to the Marvel Television series Agents of S.H.I.E.L.D. (2013–2020). In June 2017, he described Blade as a "legacy character" and said "it would be fun to do something with him one day". In August 2018, Snipes said he had continued to have discussions with Marvel for over two years, and there were two potential projects in development for the character.

Shortly after Ali won Best Supporting Actor at the 91st Academy Awards in February 2019 for the film Green Book (2018), he contacted Marvel Studios and pitched a new Blade film that he would star in. Ali envisioned it as his version of the MCU film Black Panther (2018). Feige announced Blade, with Ali attached to star, at Marvel Studios' SDCC panel that July. Feige said the project was moving forward because of Ali's interest and would be part of a future "phase" of the MCU, rather than the just announced Phase Four. Snipes was surprised by the announcement but said, "Such is the 'business' of 'entertainment!'" He congratulated Ali and said he would always be a fan of Marvel Studios and the MCU.

Active development began in mid-2020, and the studio began searching for a writer-director to lead the project. Marvel Studios executive Eric Carroll was producing the film alongside Feige. At the end of September, Ali confirmed that it would have a darker tone than previous MCU films. By October, Marvel Studios was looking to hire a separate writer and director, and began looking for a writer first. The studio hoped to assemble a primarily Black cast and crew. Stacy Osei-Kuffour was hired to write the screenplay in February 2021 after a six-month "meticulous search" that Ali was directly involved in. Only Black writers were seriously considered. Borys Kit of The Hollywood Reporter felt this reflected Marvel Studios' commitment to diversity, especially for projects featuring non-white characters. Later that month, Feige said the studio did not plan for any of its future films to be R-rated other than Deadpool & Wolverine (2024), concerning some Blade fans who hoped this film could be R-rated instead of PG-13. Filming was set to begin in September 2021, to occur at Trilith Studios in Atlanta, but by May 2021 the start of filming was pushed back to July 2022 while work continued on the script.

== Work under director Bassam Tariq and production delays ==
From March to June 2021, Marvel Studios met with a shortlist of possible directors, focusing their search on Black filmmakers such as Steven Caple Jr., J. D. Dillard, Regina King, and Shaka King. Albert Hughes discussed directing the film with Marvel Studios but disagreed with their approach. Several directors were chosen to give final presentations, and Bassam Tariq "won all parties over" with his vision for the film. Tariq was in final talks to direct by the end of July, and had been hired by the start of September. Tariq said the film would not be "boxed in" by adapting comic book elements since the character has an evolving canon. Ali made an uncredited voice-only cameo as Blade in the post-credits scene of the Phase Four film Eternals, which was released in November 2021. In the scene, he contacts Kit Harington's Dane Whitman about the Ebony Blade.

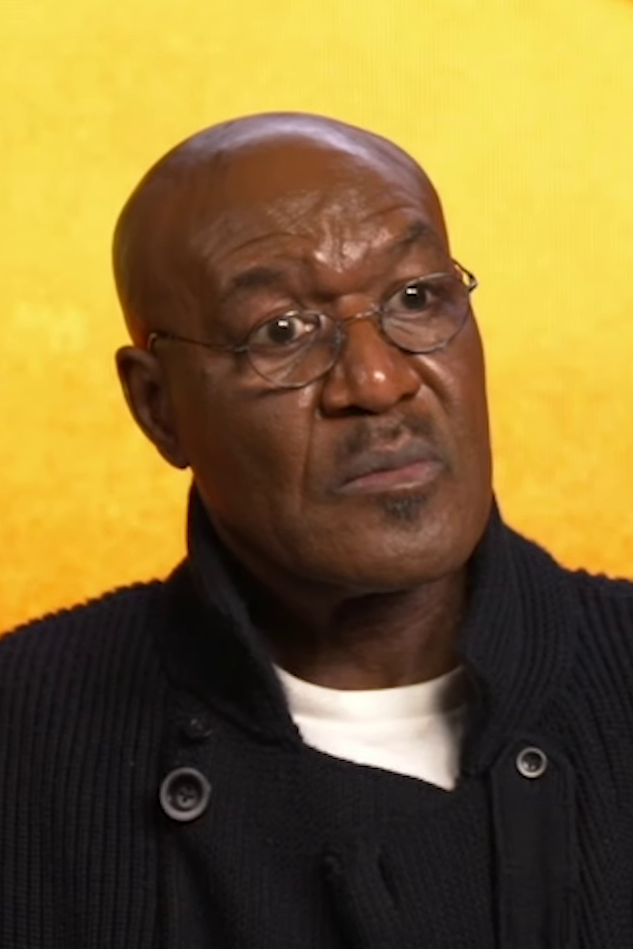
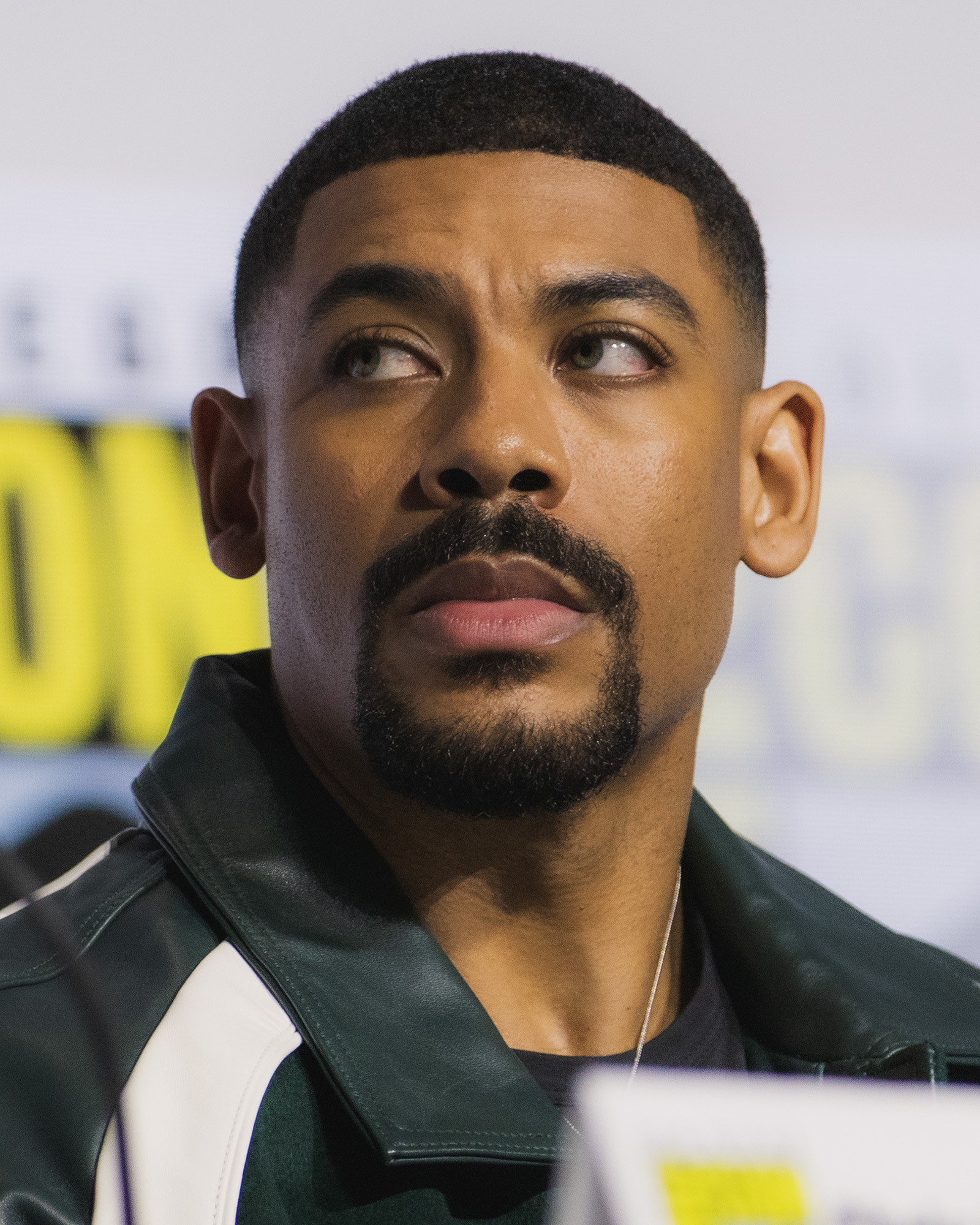
Delroy Lindo (left) and Aaron Pierre (right) joined the cast of Blade by early 2022, before the departure of original director Bassam Tariq.

Delroy Lindo was cast in late November 2021, as the head of a Black community whose philosophy and ethos are similar to those of political activist Marcus Garvey. Lindo was excited about the inclusivity of the project from early conversations with the creative team. He was previously cast as the Marvel Comics character Dominic Fortune for Marvel Television's Marvel's Most Wanted (2016), an unaired television pilot. Blade's producers wanted to cast Lindo in his film role from the start of the casting process, but they took their time casting a different major role which became "one of the more highly coveted parts in Hollywood". Feige, Tariq, and other executives met with "dozens of up-and-coming actors" for that role, and Aaron Pierre became the frontrunner in February 2022. Pierre joined the cast by the end of the month. In May, Beau DeMayo—a writer for the MCU miniseries Moon Knight (2022) and the head writer for the first season of the Marvel Studios Animation series X-Men '97 (2024)—was hired to rewrite the script and asked Marvel to hire Ben Sokolowski to assist him. The version of the film that they were working on was said to be a period piece.

Pre-production started in Atlanta between mid-June and mid-July 2022, using the working title Perfect Imprints. Principal photography was slated to last from October 2022 to January 2023, at Trilith and Tyler Perry Studios, with location shooting in Cleveland during November 2022. Ali was training for over a year to perform his own stunts, including learning to wield a sword. Several crew members from previous MCU projects were attached to the film, including Mårten Larsson as visual effects supervisor, Stefania Cella as production designer, and Ruth E. Carter as costume designer, while Damián García was hired as cinematographer. A major train set was built. Larsson was provided the Ebony Blade design by Eternals visual effects supervisor Stephane Ceretti to use in Blade. By the end of June, Milan Ray was reportedly cast as Blade's daughter. At SDCC the next month, a release date of November 3, 2023, was announced, making the film part of Phase Five. Flying Lotus had signed on to write music for the film, while Saul Williams was also cast in an undisclosed role.

After he was fired from X-Men '97, DeMayo alleged that he had been removed from Blade by September 2022 after raising concerns about the production's workplace culture, such as some Marvel executives comparing his appearance to Snipes's and other racially motivated comments. At the end of that month, Tariq stepped down as director due to further production delays, and creative differences with Marvel Studios; the studio reportedly no longer believed Tariq to be the best fit for the film. In separate statements, Marvel Studios and Tariq said they both appreciated their work together and added that Tariq would remain an executive producer. The studio was searching for a new director and filming was set to begin in November. Journalist Jeff Sneider reported that Ali was frustrated with the film's development, including the state of the script and the fact that Feige was said to be "spread too thin" with his commitments to the wider MCU. Tariq later stated that conversations with actors and the building of the sets were occurring without the script being finished, which he felt was "very dangerous" because if the script would have deviated from what he was telling actors and creatives the film would be about, he felt it would have affected his credibility as the director. In October, Marvel Studios temporarily suspended production work that was happening in Atlanta while they continued to search for a new director. Production was expected to resume in early 2023. This resulted in the film's release date being delayed to September 6, 2024, making it the last film in Phase Five at that point.

== Work under director Yann Demange and strike delays ==
Ali was reported in October 2022 to have a major involvement in the film's direction moving forward, with the potential for further rewrites to occur at his request. Marvel Studios met with filmmakers for several weeks, and presented Ali with a list of director candidates. The actor chose to search for a new director himself after being concerned that the studio's choices were largely "untested" at the major studio level. Yann Demange was handpicked by Ali for the position, and his pitch for the film excited executives. Demange was hired to direct in November, while Ali was also involved in hiring Michael Starrbury to perform a page-one rewrite. Demange was working on pre-production in Atlanta by February 2023, and filming was set to begin that May, with Matthew Libatique now hired as cinematographer. In March, Sneider reported that the new script was "leaner" and dropped elements that were deemed extraneous, such as a planned Eternals tie-in with Harington's Dane Whitman. Harington later said a misunderstanding led to rumors about his involvement in the film and this had never been planned. Sneider also reported that some roles were potentially being recast, including Blade's daughter. Starrbury's script was reported to be darker than most MCU films.

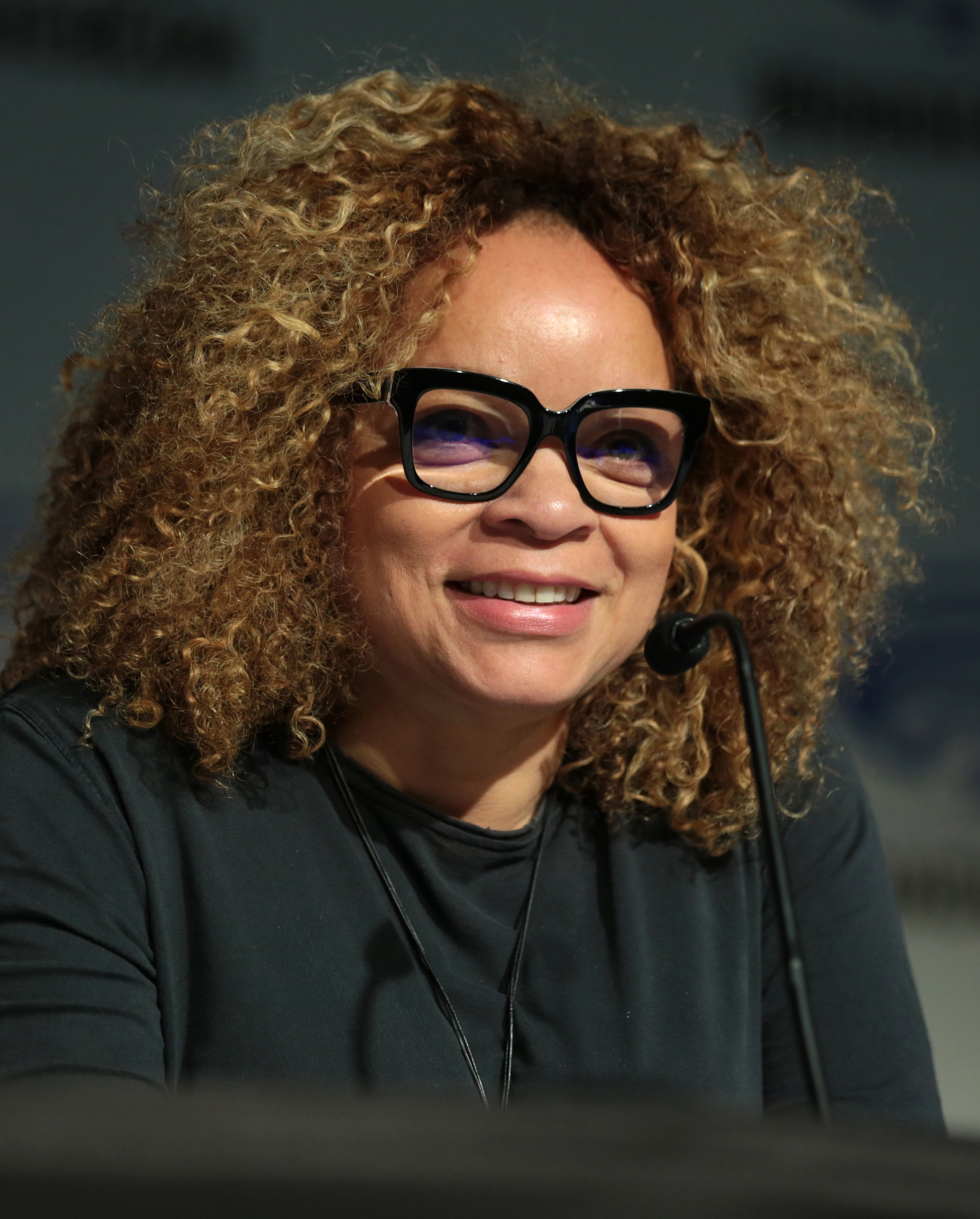
After Blade was delayed and changed to a modern setting, costume designer Ruth E. Carter re-used her costumes for a different period piece vampire film, Sinners (2025).

Mia Goth joined the cast in April as Lilith, and Nic Pizzolatto joined later that month to work on the script from Starrbury's draft. Ali chose Pizzolatto after working with him on the third season of the series True Detective (2019). The script was set in the 1920s and featured Lilith trying to obtain the blood of Blade's daughter. Goth flew to the Atlanta set for a chemistry test with Ali and to have costume and wig fittings. She was excited about the project's direction and Ali's take on his character. Carter was prepping for production and filming was set to begin in June, before Marvel shut down pre-production in early May because Pizzolatto did not have adequate time to work on the script before the 2023 Writers Guild of America strike. They planned to resume production after the strike concluded. This delay left Carter "in limbo" before she was approached by director Ryan Coogler, who she worked with on Black Panther and its sequel Black Panther: Wakanda Forever (2022), to instead work on his film Sinners (2025), another vampire film set during the Prohibition era. Carter was able to repurpose some of her research on Blade for Sinners, and Marvel allowed Sinners's production company to purchase costumes that Carter made for Blade. Feige said the studio no longer needed the costumes after deciding to move away from a period setting and were happy for Carter to use them on Sinners. Tariq was equally happy that Sinners was able to use the costumes, calling that film "so much bolder than what we could have accomplished" with Blade. In June 2023, the film's release date was pushed back to February 14, 2025.

The writers' strike ended in late September 2023. Michael Green was hired to write a new draft by November, following reports that Ali was prepared to exit over issues with the script. Tatiana Siegel at Variety reported that a prior version of the script focused on a female lead and included "life lessons", with Blade being relegated to the fourth lead role. Starrbury said this report was not reflective of the draft he worked on before the strike, explaining that Blade had been in "almost every scene". Siegel also noted speculation that Marvel Studios was looking to have a budget under $100 million for the film, which would be a deviation from the studio's typically higher spending, but Sneider soon reported that the film would have a similar budget to other MCU films. Sneider also reported that the Marvel Studios executive overseeing Blade was no longer involved with the film, or the studio, due to issues with the film's production and script, including a draft by Osei-Kuffour. Demange said Marvel now planned for the film to receive an R-rating. He was excited to show Ali's "ruthlessness", feeling the actor "usually keeps [that] under the surface". When the 2023 SAG-AFTRA strike ended in early November, the film's release date was pushed back to November 7, 2025, making it part of the franchise's Phase Six slate.

Ali said in December 2023 that he felt encouraged by the film's direction and creative team, and believed they would resume work shortly. After the SAG-AFTRA strike ended, most of the previously known actors were let go from the film, including Lindo and Pierre, though Goth remained attached; Pierre soon confirmed his departure, citing the film's creative changes since his casting, while Lindo said the project "just went off the rails". Chad Stahelski, who previously worked on several MCU films as a stuntman and second-unit director, said in January 2024 that he had discussed directing the film with Marvel. He said they had "the right people involved", but he was open to joining the project in the future if the current version did not work out. The next month, Sneider reported that the script had come to fruition and Ali was comfortable moving forward, debunking rumors that he had exited the film. Sneider later said the script had been revised to feature Ali "just killing vampires". Demange amicably exited the film in mid-March, after the director and studio had grown frustrated with the film's long development. Ali had also become increasingly frustrated with the delays and the director. Filming was expected to begin in Mexico in mid-2024 and also take place in the United Kingdom later that year. Marvel Studios began searching for a new writer and director. Demange's exit was publicly revealed in mid-June.

== Search for a third director and changing priorities ==
Shortly after Demange's exit was publicly revealed in June 2024, the film was considered unlikely to begin production in time to meet the November 2025 release date. A release delay had been expected as early as February 2024, amidst Disney's larger plans to scale back content. Disney CEO Bob Iger did not mention the film during an earnings call where he discussed Marvel's three other 2025 releases, and he said Disney would only release two or three Marvel films a year moving forward. Marvel Studios was reportedly no longer feeling pressure to get the film released following these efforts to reduce content output, and was prioritizing getting the film right. It was felt that the project had not received enough attention from studio executives due to Disney's mandate for them to overdevelop their production slate. Eric Pearson was rewriting the script by mid-June. A frequent writer for Marvel Studios, Pearson was internally seen as a "closer" who could "bring scripts over the finish line". He was expected to work on the script through the following months before it was shown to potential directors. The film's setting was changed to the present day. David S. Goyer contacted Marvel about writing the script, after previously working on the New Line trilogy, but the studio turned down his offer.

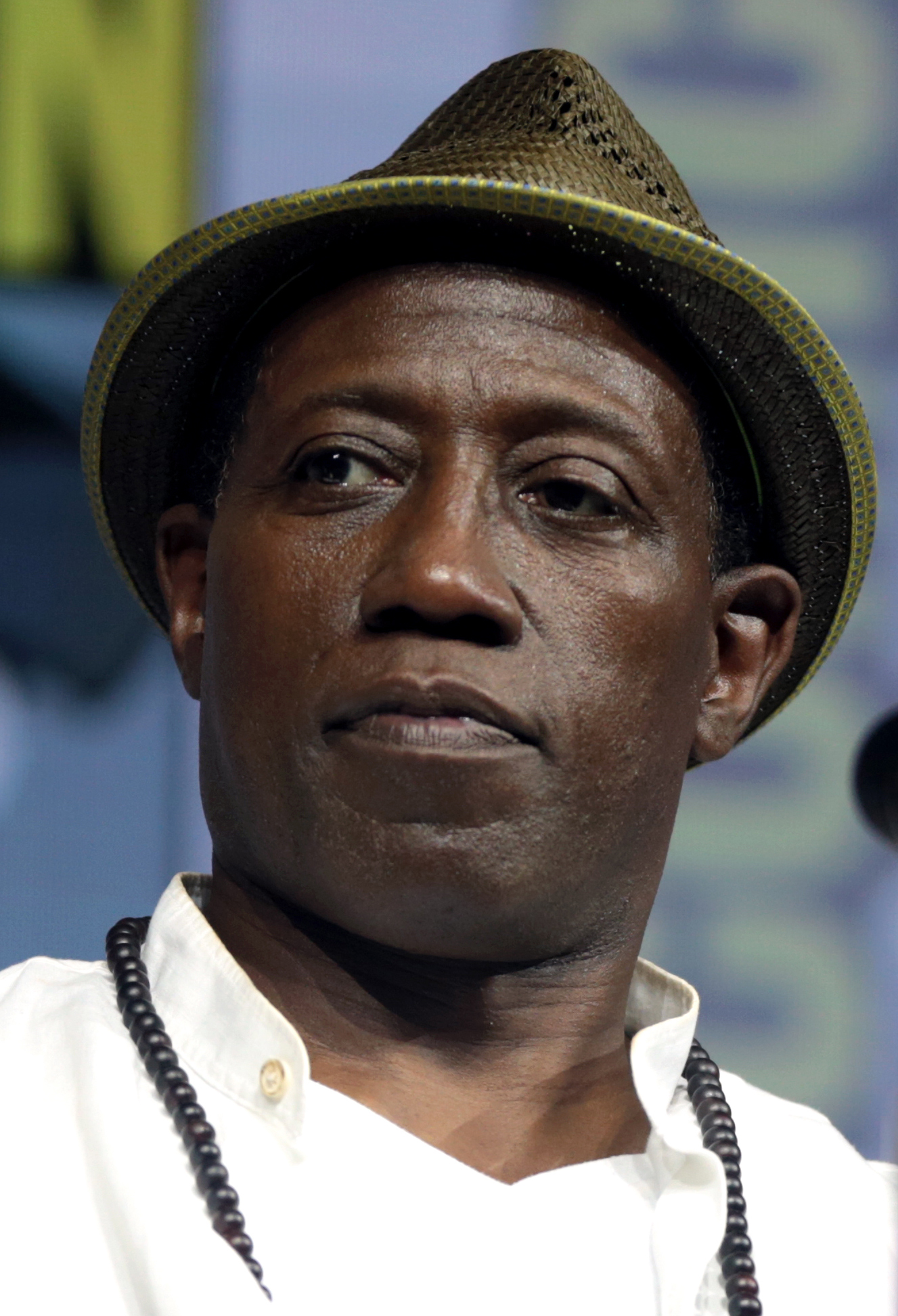
During the delayed development of Blade, Wesley Snipes returned as his version of the character for the MCU film Deadpool & Wolverine (2024)

In July 2024, Feige confirmed that Marvel intended for Blade to receive an R-rating like the New Line films, similar to how Deadpool & Wolverine was made to receive an R-rating to align with the previous Deadpool films. Feige said the studio was committed to making the film right and admitted their frustrations with the development process. He had read half of Pearson's new draft and felt positive about it. Also that month, Snipes was revealed to have reprised his role as Blade in the multiverse-based Deadpool & Wolverine. He did not think a return to the role would have been possible because Marvel Studios was moving ahead with Ali in the role. The film includes a meta joke, delivered by Snipes, that states "There's only been one Blade! Only ever gonna be one Blade." Following its release, Snipes jokingly acknowledged fans who called for Ali's Blade to be canceled and for Snipes's version to be officially integrated with the MCU. In August, Disney updated its calendar and reaffirmed Blade's November 2025 release. Commentators were surprised that it was not removed from that date, but anticipated it would be eventually; Disney removed Blade from its release calendar in October. Feige reaffirmed a month later that the film was still in development and Ali's version of the character would appear in the MCU.

Sneider reported in March 2025 that Cary Joji Fukunaga was poised to direct Blade by late 2024, but negotiations fell through because Marvel wanted a "studio-friendly" director. He said Marvel was considering Stahelski instead. In June, Adam B. Vary at Variety reported that the film was still in development, while Ali said he was unsure "where Marvel [was] at" with it. The next month, Feige said the film was still in development and Ali was still attached. He expressed regret that it had not come to fruition so long after its announcement and said the studio only wanted to move forward if it was going to be "insanely great" with a script they were confident in. They did not want to "just put a leather outfit on [Ali] and have him start killing vampires", and executives reportedly did not feel a sense of urgency in making the film amidst a wider "pullback" of the superhero genre. Feige confirmed that three or four iterations of the film had been developed, two being period pieces, and the studio had settled on a contemporary setting. Following calls for Coogler to direct the film after his work on Sinners, Feige said this would not happen and noted that Coogler was already set to direct Black Panther III (2028) for the studio.

Blade Knight, an alternate version of the character incorporating elements of Moon Knight, appears in the first season of the animated series Marvel Zombies (2025). This version features Ali's likeness but was voiced by Todd Williams, as scheduling issues prevented Ali from reprising his role. Marvel Studios executive Brad Winderbaum said Marvel Zombies was developed concurrently with Blade and was originally expected to be released after the film. The series' creative team decided to create new "lore" for the character so they did not have to align with the film's changing plans. In October 2025, Goth said she was still attached to the film and she felt the delays were "for the best", allowing Marvel Studios to ensure they got it right.

== Mahershala Ali's departure ==
Rodrigo Perez at The Playlist reported in March 2025 that development on Blade had been paused and the film was "essentially nixed", with Marvel looking to feature Ali's Blade as a supporting character in another project such as the crossover film Avengers: Secret Wars (2027) or a rumored team-up Midnight Sons film. Sneider similarly reported in January 2026 that Blade was "dead" and Marvel Studios was instead looking to include the character in a Midnight Sons film. Oscar Isaac, who portrays Moon Knight in the MCU, confirmed in April that there had been discussions about a Midnight Sons project.

In July 2026, Feige said he felt like a failure for not being able to get a Blade film made with Ali, although he was pleased to have Snipes reprise his role for Deadpool & Wolverine. Dais Johnston at Inverse interpreted Feige's comments as confirmation that Blade, or at least Ali's version of it, was "dead". When asked about Feige's comments, Ali said he had moved on from the role and stated, "For whatever reason, that project is not for me. If [Marvel] wanted to do it, we would've done it." He had since starred in the film Your Mother Your Mother Your Mother (2026), which was written and directed by Tariq and made use of Ali's stunt training and sword skills from Blade. The actor said that film only happened because he and Tariq did not make Blade, and later said "I'm done. I'm doing [Your Mother Your Mother Your Mother] and anything else moving forward. I'm over [Blade], I'm done with that." Multiple commentators described the film as being officially "dead" or canceled following Ali's comments.

== See also ==
- List of unproduced film projects based on Marvel Comics
  - List of Marvel Cinematic Universe films § Repurposed and abandoned projects
  - Gambit (unproduced film) — another unproduced Marvel Comics film with a prolonged development history
  - Silver & Black (unproduced film) — another unproduced Marvel Comics film with a prolonged development history
