= Gnomeo & Juliet =

2011 animated film

- American theatrical release poster
- Directed by: Kelly Asbury
- Screenplay by: Andy Riley; Kevin Cecil; Mark Burton; Emily Cook; Kathy Greenberg; Steve Hamilton Shaw; Kelly Asbury
- Story by: Rob Sprackling; John Smith; Andy Riley; Kevin Cecil; Kelly Asbury; Steve Hamilton Shaw
- Based on: Romeo and Juliet by William Shakespeare
- Produced by: Baker Bloodworth; Steve Hamilton Shaw; David Furnish; Elton John
- Starring: James McAvoy; Emily Blunt; Michael Caine; Maggie Smith; Jason Statham; Patrick Stewart; Ashley Jensen; Stephen Merchant; Matt Lucas; Jim Cummings; Julie Walters; Richard Wilson; Ozzy Osbourne; Dolly Parton; Hulk Hogan
- Edited by: Catherine Apple
- Music by: James Newton Howard; Chris Bacon
- Production company: Rocket Pictures
- Distributed by: Walt Disney Studios Motion Pictures (Note: Distributed by Walt Disney Studios Motion Pictures under the Touchstone Pictures banner.) (United States); Entertainment One Films (United Kingdom)
- Release dates: January 23, 2011 (El Capitan Theatre); February 11, 2011 (United States and United Kingdom)
- Running time: 83 minutes
- Countries: United States; United Kingdom
- Language: English
- Budget: $36 million
- Box office: $194 million

Gnomeo & Juliet is a 2011 animated musical fantasy romantic comedy film directed by Kelly Asbury. It is loosely based on the play Romeo and Juliet, and features the voices of James McAvoy, Emily Blunt, Michael Caine, Maggie Smith, Jason Statham, Patrick Stewart, Ashley Jensen, Stephen Merchant, Matt Lucas, Jim Cummings, Julie Walters, Richard Wilson, Ozzy Osbourne, Dolly Parton, and Hulk Hogan in his final film role before his death in July 2025. The story follows Gnomeo and Juliet, a pair of garden gnomes who fall in love, but due to the feud between their respective families, they must find a way to keep their blossoming romance a secret.

Gnomeo & Juliet premiered at the El Capitan Theatre in Hollywood on January 23, 2011, and was theatrically released on February 11 by Walt Disney Studios Motion Pictures under the Touchstone Pictures label. The film received mixed reviews from critics and was a box-office success, grossing $194 million on a $36 million budget. It received nominations for four Annie Awards. The song "Hello Hello" by Elton John and Lady Gaga was nominated for the Golden Globe award, the Satellite Award, and the Critics' Choice Award for Best Original Song. A sequel, Sherlock Gnomes, was released in 2018.

== Plot ==
In the British town of Stratford-upon-Avon, two elderly neighbours, Miss Montague and Mr. Capulet despise each other. When they leave their backyards, their garden gnomes and other lawn ornaments come to life. The Montague garden is inhabited by blue-hatted gnomes led by Lady Blueberry, while the Capulet's is home to red-hatted gnomes led by Lord Redbrick. The feud between the human owners is mirrored by the rivalry of their respective gnome factions.

One day, during a lawnmower race in an alleyway, Lady Blueberry's son, Gnomeo, competes against Tybalt, a Red gnome, who destroys Gnomeo's lawnmower and gets very angry. That night, Gnomeo and his friend, Benny, infiltrate the Red garden to sabotage Tybalt's lawnmower, only for Benny to paint a wishing well, and trigger a security alarm instead which caused them to run. During the escape, Gnomeo stumbles into an abandoned greenhouse and meets Juliet, the daughter of Lord Redbrick, who is retrieving a unique Cupid's Arrow orchid. Since they were in black outfits and paint they didn't know they were blue and red. They become infatuated until they fall into a pond and their disguises get washed away, leading them to discover that they belong to rival gardens. Juliet flees, later confiding in her water spout frog friend, Nanette.

Despite the rivalry, Gnomeo and Juliet continue to meet secretly in the abandoned grenhouse garden. They explore the garden and find a storage room in the backyard. They encounter Featherstone, a plastic flamingo who was locked in a garden shed for 20 years and encourages their relationship. Meanwhile, Lord Redbrick arranges Juliet's pairing with Paris, a nerdy Red gnome, though Juliet diverts his attention to Nanette. After the Reds destroy the Blue's prized wisteria, Gnomeo retaliates by attempting to spray the Reds' tulips with poison, but Juliet catches him in the act. The two argue, but reconcile after Featherstone shares his story of how he lost his mate due to their human owners divorcing.

Benny witnesses Gnomeo and Juliet together and runs off, encountering Tybalt, who shatters Benny's hat. A confrontation between Gnomeo and Tybalt ensues, resulting in the latter's death when his mower runs into a ditch and sends him flying into a wall. The Reds retaliate, and Gnomeo is pushed into a busy road and seemingly gets run over by a truck carrying a bunch of teapots. A shattered blue teapot that fell off said truck leads everyone to believe Gnomeo has been killed. Lord Redbrick sadly confines Juliet by gluing her feet to her tower, while the Blues gather to mourn the loss of Gnomeo, unaware that he survived by jumping onto the truck's grille just before he got run over.

Gnomeo ends up in a park and recounts his story to a statue of William Shakespeare, who predicts a tragic ending. Meanwhile, Benny, using Mrs. Montague's computer, orders a powerful lawnmower called the Terrafirminator for revenge. Once activated, the Terrafirminator goes haywire seconds later and starts destroying both gardens as the gnomes engage in battle. After learning of Juliet's peril from his blue mushroom pet named Shroom, Gnomeo, Featherstone and Shroom hurry back to the chaos to save Juliet. As the Terrafirminator targets Juliet's tower, Gnomeo and Juliet reunite and share a kiss before the machine crashes into the tower and explodes, presumably killing them both.

Believing the couple to have been killed, Lady Blueberry and Lord Redbrick reconcile and end their feud until Lord Redbrick accidentally steps on a switch the same way Gnomeo did earlier in the film; this clears some of the rubble. Gnomeo and Juliet emerge unharmed from the debris and share a kiss, and the two families celebrate. Suddenly, Miss Montague and Mr. Capulet return home, only to find their gardens destroyed. Later, Gnomeo and Juliet get married, Tybalt is glued back together, Featherstone reunites with his mate, and the gnomes gather to watch Gnomeo and Juliet depart together on a purple lawnmower, symbolizing the union of the two gardens.

== Voice cast ==
- James McAvoy as Gnomeo, Lady Bluebury's son and Juliet's love interest. He is based on Romeo Montague.
- Emily Blunt as Juliet, Lord Redbrick's daughter and Gnomeo's love interest. She is based on Juliet Capulet.
- Matt Lucas as Benny, Gnomeo's best friend. He is based on both Mercutio and Benvolio, though the fate of his hat being smashed by Tybalt before the film's climax is similar to the former's.
- Ashley Jensen as Nanette, a Scottish plastic pond spitter frog, Paris' love interest and Juliet's best friend. She is based on Nurse.
- Michael Caine as Lord Redbrick, leader of the Red gnomes and Juliet's widowed father. He is based on Lord Capulet.
- Maggie Smith as Lady Bluebury, leader of the Blue gnomes and Gnomeo's widowed mother. She is based on Lord and Lady Montague.
- Jim Cummings as Featherstone, a lonely plastic flamingo with an Italian accent. He is based on Friar Laurence.
- Stephen Merchant as Paris, a nerdy red gnome who was arranged to marry Juliet, and Nanette's love interest. He is based on Count Paris.
- Jason Statham as Tybalt, Gnomeo and Benny's nemesis and Juliet's cousin. He is based on the character of the same name.
- Kelly Asbury as Red Goon Gnomes, a group of miniature gnomes who act as servants to Lord Redbrick and the other Red gnomes. They are based on Gregory, Sampson, Anthony, and Potpan.
- Ozzy Osbourne as Fawn, a miniature deer statue and Tybalt's best friend.
- Julie Walters as Ms. Montague, the elderly owner of the Blue garden.
- Richard Wilson as Mr. Capulet, the elderly owner of the Red garden.
- Patrick Stewart as a statue of William Shakespeare, the author of Romeo and Juliet.
- Dolly Parton as Dolly Gnome, a country girl gnome who is the lawnmower race announcer.
- Hulk Hogan as Terrafirminator V.O., the voiceover of the Terrafirminator lawnmower advert.
- James Daniel Wilson as Fishing Gnome, a red gnome.
- Tim Bentinck and Neil McCaul as Conjoined Gnomes, two red-hatted gnomes who are conjoined by the stand.
- Julio Bonet as Mankini Gnome, Dolly Gnome's love interest.
- Julia Braams as a stone fish attached to the fishing line of the Fishing Gnome.
- Maurissa Horwitz as an unnamed Porcelain doll, Benny's love interest.

== Production ==
The film was the original idea of Rob Sprackling and John Smith, who sold the spec script to Disney through Rocket Pictures. Disney studio chairman Dick Cook greenlit the film, under then Disney-owned Miramax Films in 2006, after turning it down previously as Walt Disney Animation Studios project. Miramax was later sold by Disney in 2010, but the latter studio retained the rights to the film. Starz Animation produced and animated the film. After first sitting on the film as it was an animated film not by a Disney animation unit, Disney Studios then opted to release the film through its Touchstone Pictures banner. Australian director Adam Elliot was approached and asked to direct the film, but he rejected the offer due to the film's incompatibility with his style, as well as his lack of experience with CGI.

Asbury got on board in 2006, and was attracted to the movie in order to work with Elton John. Asbury and Hamilton Shaw then rewrote the film "sort of from scratch", A particular challenge, according to Asbury was how to differentiate the ending between the original play and the movie in order to "keep daggers and poison and suicide out". Asbury had free range of the casting and conducted the process only through listening to voices, not knowing which actor was auditioning until he felt they were right for the character. Prior to the casting of James McAvoy and Emily Blunt, the roles of Gnomeo and Juliet were originally to be voiced by Ewan McGregor and Kate Winslet, respectively.

== Music ==
Gnomeo & Juliet: Original Soundtrack is the soundtrack album and was released by Buena Vista Records on February 1, 2011. It features music by Elton John (who was also the film's executive producer), Nelly Furtado, Kiki Dee, and selections from the score composed by Chris Bacon and James Newton Howard (who played keyboards for Elton John and arranged strings on many previous projects).

The duet of John and Lady Gaga for "Hello, Hello" was featured in the film, released on February 11, 2011, but the soundtrack version only features John. Additionally, on May 4, 2011, the duet was leaked online and available for download on most sharing websites.

== Release ==
Gnomeo & Juliet's worldwide premiere was at El Capitan Theatre in Hollywood on January 23, 2011. The film was released by Walt Disney Studios Motion Pictures under the Touchstone Pictures banner on February 11, 2011. The film was Touchstone's first animated film since 1993's The Nightmare Before Christmas and also Touchstone's first and only film to receive a G rating from the MPAA. The film was distributed by Disney worldwide except for selected territories such as the UK and Ireland, where Entertainment One Films released the movie. Pathé International handled international sales for the film. Elton John and director Asbury presented 10 minutes of the film at the Cannes Film Festival.

=== Home media ===
Gnomeo & Juliet was released by Touchstone Home Entertainment on Blu-ray 3D, Blu-ray, and DVD on May 24, 2011. The film was produced as three different packages: a 1-disc DVD, a 2-disc Blu-ray/DVD combo pack, and a 3-disc Blu-ray 3D, Blu-ray, and DVD combo pack. The 3-disc package also includes access to a digital download of the film. Both the DVD and Blu-ray versions of the release include the music video for Elton John and Nelly Furtado's version of John's "Crocodile Rock", as well as the extras "Elton Builds a Garden" and "Frog Talk" with Ashley Jensen. In addition, the Blu-ray version also has several deleted and alternate scenes, as well as a feature with Ozzy Osbourne called "The Fawn of Darkness".

== Reception ==
=== Critical response ===
On Rotten Tomatoes, Gnomeo & Juliet holds an approval rating of 55% based on reviews from 126 critics, with an average rating of 5.6/10. The site's consensus reads: "While it has moments of inspiration, Gnomeo & Juliet is often too self-referential for its own good." On Metacritic, it has a score of 53 out of 100, based on 28 reviews, indicating "mixed or average reviews". Audiences polled by CinemaScore gave the film a grade of "B+" on an A+ to F scale.

Joe Morgenstern of The Wall Street Journal gave it a positive review, saying "This lively little film, a comic take on Shakespeare's tragedy, is really entertaining". Ty Burr of The Boston Globe says "It has its own bizarre charms and a breezy confidence that renders it the very definition of a simple pleasure." Justin Chang of Variety writes "A welcome dose of honest silliness at a time when most family-oriented toons settle for smart-alecky."

In a mixed review, Tasha Robinson from The A.V. Club criticizes the film: "Far too much of the film is devoted to eye-rolling pop-culture gags and long montages set to recycled Elton John songs."

=== Box office ===
Gnomeo & Juliet grossed approximately $100 million in North America and $94 million internationally, for a worldwide total of $193.9 million. It outperformed Mars Needs Moms, a more expensive Disney release that followed a month later.

The film opened in 2,994 theaters in North America on February 11, 2011, earning $6.2 million on its first day and $25.4 million over its opening weekend, finishing third behind Just Go with It and Justin Bieber: Never Say Never. Despite not debuting at number one, it set a record for the largest opening weekend for an animated feature released during the winter months (January–February) and for a minor animated title with little pre-release anticipation, according to Box Office Mojo.

During its second weekend—Presidents' Day weekend—Gnomeo & Juliet topped the global box office with $29.8 million, despite ranking second domestically and internationally behind other films. It became the highest-grossing winter-released animated film at the time, a title it held until The Lego Movie surpassed it in 2014.

In the United Kingdom, Ireland, and Malta, it opened at number one with £2.9 million ($4.7 million) and eventually grossed $25.3 million in the UK, making it the second-highest market for the film after North America.

=== Accolades ===
Award	Category	Recipients	Result
Annie Awards	Directing in a Feature Production	Kelly Asbury	Nominated
Annie Awards	Storyboarding in a Feature Production	Nelson Yokota	Nominated
Annie Awards	Voice Acting in a Feature Production	Jim Cummings	Nominated
Annie Awards	Writing in a Feature Production	Andy Riley, Kevin Cecil, Mark Burton, Kathy Greenburg, Emily Cook, Rob Sprackling, John Smith, Kelly Asbury, Steve Hamilton Shaw	Nominated
Critics' Choice Movie Awards	Best Song	"Hello Hello", performed by Elton John and Lady Gaga/written by Elton John and Bernie Taupin	Nominated
Golden Globe Awards	Best Original Song	"Hello Hello", performed by Elton John and Lady Gaga/written by Elton John and Bernie Taupin	Nominated
Satellite Awards	Best Original Song	"Hello Hello", performed by Elton John and Lady Gaga/written by Elton John and Bernie Taupin	Nominated

== Sequel ==
In March 2012, it was reported that a sequel titled Sherlock Gnomes was in development at Rocket Pictures. Andy Riley and Kevin Cecil, two of the nine writers on the first film, were writing the script for the sequel. Steve Hamilton Shaw and David Furnish produced the film, and Elton John was an executive producer, and again composed songs for the film. The film featured Sherlock Gnomes, "the greatest ornamental detective" hired by the characters from the first film, to solve the mystery of disappearing gnomes. John Stevenson, director of Kung Fu Panda, directed the sequel, and Johnny Depp voiced Sherlock Gnomes. The film was released March 23, 2018. Unlike the original, it was released by Paramount Pictures and Metro-Goldwyn-Mayer.
