= .EDU Film Festival =

School film festival in Minnesota, United States

The .EDU Film Festival is Minnesota's only school-sponsored, statewide, high school film festival. The two-day event puts Minnesota's young filmmakers together with film industry professionals and provides them with an authentic festival experience. The festival features student film screenings, equipment demos; roundtables with film directors, writers, and producers; and meet-and-greets with post secondary institutions that feature strong film/video production programs.

In 2009, young filmmakers representing 25 schools from around the state of Minnesota submitted 125 short films to the festival. Films are categorized as narrative, documentary, animation, or experimental film and must be student-made and without violence, profanity or drug use.

The festival takes place in Minneapolis, Minnesota and is housed in several venues such as the Riverview Theater in South Minneapolis, St. Anthony Main Theater on the Mississippi Riverfront in Northeast Minneapolis, and the Parkway Theater also in South Minneapolis.

A long list of notable Minnesota filmmakers support the .EDU Film Festival by serving as panelists during both days of the event. In 2009 panelists included: documentarian Melody Gilbert, documentarian Matt Ehling, film reviewer and novelist Peter Schilling, film critic Colin Covert, film writer Jim Brunzell III, news editor Euan Kerr, filmmaker and animator Tom Schroeder, screenwriter Michael Starrbury, producer/filmmaker Bobby Marsden, production manager Deena Graf, and creative director Jeffrey Bair.

== Mission statement ==
As the only school-sponsored, statewide, student film festival in the state of Minnesota, The .EDU Film Festival serves an important role in the development of young filmmakers in our state. .EDU aims to provide young filmmakers with an authentic film festival experience, a valuable understanding of the film industry, and an opportunity to screen their movies on "the big screen".

By putting students together with Minnesota filmmakers, industry professionals, and post high school educational institutions, the .EDU Film Festival also introduces the young people of Minnesota to the variety of film industry options available right here in our state.

Lastly, The .EDU Film Festival provides a time and place for young filmmakers from all over the state to interact with each other, form friendships and partnerships, and to create a professional network of peers.
