= The Ark and the Aardvark =

Upcoming American animated film

- Directed by: John Stevenson
- Screenplay by: Philip LaZebnik; Glen Dolman
- Story by: Richie Chavez; Chris Jenkins; Larry Leker
- Produced by: Keith Kjarval; Kurt Rauer
- Starring: Miles Teller; Aubrey Plaza; Jenny Slate; Rob Riggle; Craig Robinson; Stephen Merchant
- Production companies: Unified Pictures; ReDefine Animation
- Country: United States
- Language: English
- Budget: $35 million

The Ark and the Aardvark is an American upcoming animated adventure comedy film directed by John Stevenson and written by Philip LaZebnik and Glen Dolman. Produced by Unified Pictures and ReDefine Animation, it features the voices of Miles Teller, Aubrey Plaza, Jenny Slate, Rob Riggle, Craig Robinson, and Stephen Merchant. The story follows an aardvark named Gilbert who becomes the leader of a group of misfit animals in order to bring all the animals onto Noah's Ark.

Development on the animated film began in October 2007 with Unified Pictures set to produce the film, and John Stevenson announced as director in 2013. During pre-production, the title was originally Noah's Ark, before eventually being changed to its current title. Much of the cast were revealed in September 2017, after Teller joined the cast in October 2016.

== Premise ==
The story follows an outcast aardvark by the name of Gilbert, who becomes the reluctant leader of a ragtag group of misfit animals that need to be led to the mighty ark before the impending flood. Along their journey, they band together to conquer unforeseen obstacles, and ultimately, Gilbert discovers within himself the inner strength and ingenuity to prove that in a world of "twos", he was truly destined to be "the one".

== Voice cast ==
- Miles Teller as Gilbert, an aardvark
- Aubrey Plaza as Brain, an intelligent spider
- Jenny Slate as Mitzy, a clumsy ostrich
- Rob Riggle as Todd, a short-tempered elephant who is the captain of the ark
- Craig Robinson as Clyde, an arrogant bullfrog
- Stephen Merchant as Croc, a villainous crocodile

== Production ==
On October 1, 2007, it was revealed that Philip LaZebnik would write the screenplay for the animated movie Noah's Ark, which Unified Pictures would produce. In March 2013, it was announced that ElectroAge would handle the animation and John Stevenson would direct.

On October 3, 2016, Miles Teller signed on to star in the retitled The Ark and the Aardvark, which had officially entered production. In September 2017, it was reported that Aubrey Plaza, Jenny Slate, Craig Robinson, Rob Riggle, and Stephen Merchant had joined the voice cast.

In August 2024, ReDefine, a Montreal-based animation studio owned by DNEG, came onboard to help complete the film after being in development hell.
