= Michael Starrbury =

American screenwriter and producer

- Occupations: Screenwriter; producer
- Years active: 2009–present
- Notable work: The Inevitable Defeat of Mister & Pete; Legends of Chamberlain Heights; When They See Us; Colin in Black & White

Michael Starrbury is an American screenwriter and producer known for his work on the film The Inevitable Defeat of Mister & Pete, and the television series Legends of Chamberlain Heights, When They See Us, and Colin in Black & White.

== Career ==
In 2009, Starrbury served as a panelist for .EDU Film Festival. In July 2013, he wrote the Lionsgate film The Inevitable Defeat of Mister & Pete. By May 2015, he scripted the Comedy Central series Legends of Chamberlain Heights. In July 2018, he was writing the series When They See Us, the first in three projects for Netflix. In August 2021, the second Netflix collaboration occurred when they hired Starrbury to write the screenplay for Colin in Black & White. In December 2021, the third Netflix project was revealed when Starrbury was hired to script their film adaptation of David F. Walker's comic, The Hated. In November 2022, Deadline Hollywood reported that Starrbury would be collaborating with Marvel Studios, having been set to script the reboot of Blade.

== Filmography ==
Key
†	Denotes productions that have not yet been released

Year	Title	Credited as		Notes
Year	Title	Writer	Producer	Notes
2013	The Inevitable Defeat of Mister & Pete	Yes	Co-producer	Film
2016–17	Legends of Chamberlain Heights	Yes	Executive	20 episodes Also actor Role: Malik Cummings
2019	When They See Us	Yes	No	Episode: "Part Four"
2021	Colin in Black & White	Yes	Executive	Episodes: "Cornrows" and "Dear Colin"

== Accolades ==
List of awards and nominations
Award	Date of ceremony	Category	Series	Result	Ref.
Black Reel Awards	February 13, 2014	Best Screenplay, Adapted or Original	The Inevitable Defeat of Mister & Pete	Nominated	
Independent Spirit Awards	March 1, 2014	Outstanding Best First Screenplay	The Inevitable Defeat of Mister & Pete	Nominated	
Black Reel Awards	February 7, 2019	Outstanding Writing, TV Movie/Limited Series	When They See Us	Nominated	
Primetime Emmy Award	September 14–15, 2019	Outstanding Writing for a Limited Series, Movie, or Dramatic Special	When They See Us	Nominated	
African-American Film Critics Association	December 10, 2019	Best Writing	When They See Us	Won	
Humanitas Prize	January 24, 2020	Limited Series, TV Movie, or Special	When They See Us	Won	
NAACP Image Awards	February 22, 2020	Outstanding Writing in a Drama Series	When They See Us	Nominated	
Black Reel Awards	February 28, 2022	Outstanding Television Movie or Limited Series	Colin in Black & White	Nominated	
Black Reel Awards	February 28, 2022	Outstanding Writing, TV Movie/Limited Series	Colin in Black & White	Nominated	
