= Slacker Cats =

American adult animated sitcom produced in 2007–09

- Genre: Adult animation; Animated sitcom
- Created by: Andy Riley; Kevin Cecil
- Starring: Harland Williams; Sinbad; Nicole Sullivan; Allen Covert; Kiersten Warren; Emo Philips
- Opening theme: Jason Frederick
- Country of origin: United States
- Original language: English
- No. of seasons: 2
- No. of episodes: 12

Production
- Executive producers: Kevin Cecil; Andy Riley; Seth Kearsley
- Running time: 30 minutes
- Production companies: Film Roman; Laika

Original release
- Network: ABC Family (season 1); ABC Family website (season 2)
- Release: August 13, 2007 – January 23, 2009

Slacker Cats is an adult animated sitcom created by British writers Andy Riley and Kevin Cecil for ABC Family. The series premiered on August 13, 2007 and features the voice talents of comedians Harland Williams and Sinbad as slacker cats Buckley and Eddie who live in the fictional city of Wendell, California. The series is produced by Film Roman and Laika. Riley and Cecil served as executive producers for the series, along with animation director Seth Kearsley, who designed the characters. 12 episodes were produced.

When the show was first announced, despite an initial lack of information, and its presence on ABC Family, many outlets erroneously believed Slacker Cats was aimed towards kids, but in later advertising and in press kits issued to the media, it was clearly indicated that the show aims towards more of an adult tone and themes. The show's 10PM broadcast time further illustrated that its target was an adult audience. It was the fourth adult animated series produced by Disney, the other three being The PJs, which aired on Fox, Clerks: The Animated Series, which aired on ABC, and Clone High, which was a co-production of MTV, Teletoon and Nelvana, and is the only adult animated show from them at the time to not be produced at Touchstone Television, now known as ABC Signature.

Slacker Cats was canceled on September 17, 2007, after six episodes. A second season premiered on the ABC Family website on December 19, 2008, and was released on iTunes and Xbox Live Marketplace. The second season was numbered as a continuation of the first season, episodes 7 through 12.

== Plot ==
The series is about the adventures of Buckley and Eddie, respectively, as the slacker cats go on their quotidian, strange and outrageous lives. Most plots of the show revolve around Buckley and Eddie's schemes to escape the everyday monotony of being slacker cats by taking advantage of humans (as well as other cats) to freewheel themselves in the fictional city of Wendell, California.

== Cast and characters ==
Buckley and Eddie.

=== Buckley ===
Buckley is a brave, young Maine Coon who has indigo fur, a white V-shaped mark on the chest, black eyes and a pink snout, and this is clever by cat standards, but he thinks he is much more clever than he really is, which causes him and Eddie to encounter a lot of trouble. He secretly wants to be human, feeling that life is limited as a cat. His best friend is Eddie, who is often the cause of his mishaps. Buckley is also the constant nemesis of Mrs. Boots for reasons that remain unknown. He is in love with his owner Louise and plans on marrying her, but she doesn't return his feelings. Despite his unreturned feelings, he still addresses her as if she were his girlfriend. Buckley's personality fluctuates from being lazy and uncaring to being remotely active and feeling guilty. He is notably more ethical than Eddie. Buckley also shows an aggressive side, attacking his friend Tabitha and removing her remaining ear, though it was later reattached. Buckley is one of the two main protagonists of the series alongside Eddie, and he is voiced by Harland Williams.

=== Eddie ===
Eddie is an adventurous, but cute tabby cat with orange fur who looks surprisingly like him. Eddie is Buckley's best friend but he rarely acts like it. Eddie is extremely egotistical about himself, even to the point of kissing a dummy replica of himself. Eddie often speaks of his way with lady cats and past events that involve numerous lady cats at one time, although there is no evidence of this. However, he's stated by other characters to be more of a "tough alley cat" than a normal house cat, hinting Eddie could actually be somewhat of a ladies man. Yet at the same time is also shown to be very desperate, including going far out of his way and hurting himself/friends to get attention from female cats. He resides with his owner, Dan. He knows Buckley is in love with his owner, Louise, and often makes fun of him for it, calling him a "sicko" or an "ownerphile" whenever he looks at something human-related. However, he will still stand up for Buckley, normally against Mrs. Boots asking "Where is Mr. Boots?" which causes her run off angrily every time. He is one of the two main protagonists alongside Buckley, and he is voiced by Sinbad.

=== Tabitha ===
Tabitha is a light pink Munchkin cat and her owner is currently unknown. He is implied she may be a stray because of her neglected appearance. However, in episode 5 she admits to have once have had an owner but since then had forgotten who it was. She has one ear, which has a bow on it and the other seems to have been mostly bitten off. She is also often shown carrying a small green purse. She is not too bright, but she is cheery and believes she is everyone's friend. Of all the people in Wendell, she enjoys spending time with Buckley and Eddie, much to their annoyance. Whenever she sees them and tries to talk she is given an excuse by Eddie why they are too busy or tells her to wait somewhere for them, often somewhere dangerous. She is willing to forgive anything, including being left in the middle of a highway or having her ear ripped off by Buckley. She often shows characteristics of bipolar disorder, going from cheery to standing over Louise (whom she duct-taped to her bed) with a scalpel and directions on how to perform a "reverse conjoined twin separation" on her. She is voiced by Kiersten Warren.

=== Dooper ===
Dooper is a spoiled and pampered, but selfish cream-colored, male stray cat that lives in a cardboard box in an alley near Louise's apartment. He is afraid of almost everything and is quite nervous. As a result of this he is constantly coming up with outlandish conspiracy theories and rushes to warn everyone. The closest things to friends he has are Buckley and Eddie, whom he normally tells his theories to first. They usually ignore him, but sometimes use his conspiracy theories to trick him into doing their dirty work. He will often find small, everyday things like a crack in the pavement and use it as proof of his theories. Also it is said that Dooper doesn't have any testicles, suggesting that he once had an owner who had him neutered. He is voiced by Emo Philips.

=== Mrs. Boots ===
Mrs. Boots is an attractive light purple Persian cat. The owner is rare, and her owner's family is shown to be wealthy as she lives in a mansion. She is Buckley's nemesis and tries to thwart his plans in any way she can. The reason why she hates Buckley remains unknown. Her name derives from the difference in color of her body and her paws. The entire body is all light purple, except for her paws, which are dark brown. She is very self-conscious about them, calling them "deformities" and hiding them in her fur when she sits. She is also self-conscious about her name, always becoming aggravated when Eddie asks "Where's Mr. Boots?". She shows herself as a classy cat, but has a short temper and when angry starts to yell and her voice becomes a little bit hoarse. She is voiced by Niecy Nash.

=== Ingrid and Latoyah ===
Ingrid and Latoyah are two grey British Shorthairs, who Eddie thinks are hot. They are voiced by Masasa Moyo and Alex Borstein, respectively.

=== Louise ===
She is one of two main human characters. She is Buckley's owner and can speak to and understand Buckley, but she still treats him as a pet most of the time. Buckley has a romantic infatuation with Louise and hopes to one day consummate their relationship, although she is oblivious to the fact. Buckley even said that he once proposed to her. She is voiced by Nicole Sullivan.

=== Dan ===
He is one of two only main human characters. He is Eddie's owner, and is voiced by Greg Pitts.

== Production ==
The original 2001 pilot was animated in claymation by Laika's predecessor, Will Vinton Studios at Portland, done in the same model and animation style as Gary & Mike, which Harland Williams voiced Mike. The series was pitched to The WB, who turned it down. The pilot has a different art style from the final version. It also has a different voice cast, except for Tabitha.

The series was animated using Adobe Flash, with the animation being a split between Boulder Media in Ireland, Big Star Enterprise in South Korea and Renegade Animation in Glendale.

== Episodes ==
Season	Episodes	Originally released		
Season	Episodes	First released	Last released	Network
1	6	August 13, 2007	September 17, 2007	ABC Family
2	6	December 19, 2008	January 23, 2009	abcfamily.com

=== Season 1 (2007) ===
No. overall	No. in season	Title	Directed by	Written by	Original release date
1	1	"Mexico"	Seth Kearsley	Kevin Cecil and Andy Riley	August 13, 2007
Buckley and Eddie want to take a vacation in Mexico, but when they are unsuccessful in boarding the airplane, they decide to simply pretend that they are in Mexico. Meanwhile, ignored and in search of a friend, Tabitha brings home the corpse of a cat that died on the freeway.
2	2	"The Wood"	Perry Zombolas	Kevin Cecil and Andy Riley	August 20, 2007
Buckley tries to organize the neighborhood against a developer who is going to despoil the natural beauty of the woods. The main problem is that Trevor, the developer, is Louise's new boyfriend. Buckley also tries to find a way to re-attach Tabitha's ear, which he accidentally ripped off in a fight.
3	3	"Big Guy"	Niki Yang	Robin French and Kieron Quirke	August 27, 2007
Louise asks Buckley to clear the basement of rats. Buckley is too chicken to do so until he meets 'The Big Guy' (who turns out to be a tiger) and tries to copy everything the tiger does.
4	4	"Ozymandias"	Seth Kearsley	Andy Bodle	September 3, 2007
Buckley assumes an alias and opts to relocate after finding a man in Louise's bed.
5	5	"Casino Miaow"	Jennifer Coyle	Gideon Defoe	September 10, 2007
Buckley needs money to get Louise a birthday present, so he decides to sell Tabitha to a lab and tries to win big in Mrs. Boots's poker game.
6	6	"Buckley and Eddie Deceased"	Jennifer Coyle	Gideon Defoe	September 17, 2007
Buckley may regret his hasty course of action when he incorrectly believes that he killed Eddie.

=== Season 2 (2008–2009) ===
No. overall	No. in season	Title	Directed by	Written by	Original release date
7	1	"Dolenz1b559e"	Perry Zombolas	Roger Drew and Will Smith	December 19, 2008
Dolenz gets out of prison and forces Buckley, Eddie, and Tabitha into a crime spree.
8	2	"Sex and the Kitties"	Niki Yang	Sara Smith	December 26, 2008
Dooper becomes possessed by the ghosts of his severed testicles and Eddie is sent to the Vet to be neutered.
9	3	"Buckley on the Run"	Nathan Chew	Robin French and Kieron Quirke	January 2, 2009
Trevor comes back into Louise's life and frames Buckley the cat for killing a rabbit named Buckley. This episode guest stars Stephen Root, Dave Foley, Bobcat Goldthwait, Vanessa Ruiz and Tom Kenny.
10	4	"Garage a Trois"	Perry Zombolas	Andy Bodle	January 9, 2009
Buckley, Eddie, and Tabitha get trapped in a garage and go insane.
11	5	"Work Work Work"	Jennifer Coyle	David Quantick, Kevin Cecil, and Andy Riley	January 16, 2009
Louise loses her job, and when Buckley goes to get her job back, he actually gets her job.
12	6	"Buckley Versus the Future"	Niki Yang	Kevin Cecil and Andy Riley	January 23, 2009
Buckley turns off the internet to make the world a better place.
