= Will Gallows and the Snake-Bellied Troll =

- Author: Derek Keilty
- Illustrator: Jonny Duddle
- Cover artist: Jonny Duddle
- Language: English
- Series: Will Gallows
- Genre: Children's fiction, western, fantasy
- Published: 2011, Andersen Press
- Publication place: United Kingdom
- Media type: Print, e-book, audiobook
- Pages: 256
- ISBN: 1849392366
- Followed by: Will Gallows & the Thunder Dragon's Roar

Will Gallows and the Snake-Bellied Troll is a 2011 fantasy/western children's book by Northern Irish author Derek Keilty and the first book in the ongoing Will Gallows series. The book is illustrated by Jonny Duddle, who also illustrated the 2014 Bloomsbury editions of the Harry Potter series. The book was first published on 3 February 2011 through Andersen Press and follows the adventures of Will Gallows, a young elfling sky cowboy. It was followed by three entries, Will Gallows and the Thunder Dragon’s Roar (2012), Will Gallows and the Rock Demon’s Blood (2013), and Will Gallows and the Wolfer’s Deadly Magic (2015).

Will Gallows and the Snake Bellied Troll was selected to be part of the Richard and Judy book club.

== Synopsis ==
Will Gallows, a young elfling sky cowboy, rides out on a perilous quest to bring the evil snake-bellied troll bandit, Noose Wormworx, to justice. Noose is wanted for the murder of Will's pa - the former deputy sheriff of Oretown. Will's journey takes him deep into the heart of the West-Rock, to the dark underground city of Deadrock, where he soon uncovers a deadly secret that could spell disaster not only for Oretown, but for the whole of the West-Rock.

== Reception ==
Critical reception for Will Gallows and the Snake Bellied Troll has been positive, and Richard and Judy have praised the book as "A well-written, fast-paced story that’s ‘wild west’ meets fantasy" and had "clever characters". A reviewer for The Times also gave a favourable review for the work, which they deemed "Extremely funny and utterly bonkers”. School Librarian also reviewed Will Gallows and the Snake Bellied Troll favourably, commenting that the book would appeal to "readers from about eight to twelve, particularly those who like their fiction quirky" and also praised the book for its "ingenious amalgam of western and fantasy with a whole lot of humour added in".

=== Awards ===
- Children's Books Ireland Book of the Year (2012, shortlisted)

== Film adaptation ==
Film rights to Will Gallows and the Snake Bellied Troll have been optioned by Elton John's Rocket Pictures and Shrek 2 director Kelly Asbury was set to both write and direct the film, which will be a mixture of live-action and CGI.
