= Return of the Bunny Suicides =

Sequel collection of black comedy cartoons by Andy Riley

- First edition cover
- Author: Andy Riley
- Language: English
- Series: (Bunny Suicides)
- Genre: Humour
- Publisher: Hodder & Stoughton, Ltd
- Publication date: October 11, 2004
- Publication place: United Kingdom
- Media type: Hardcover, paperback
- Pages: 96 pages
- ISBN: 0-340-83403-X (hardcover)
- OCLC: 57318024
- Dewey Decimal: 741.5941 22
- LC Class: NC1479.R55 A4 2004a
- Preceded by: The Book of Bunny Suicides

Return of the Bunny Suicides (2004) is the second bestselling book of black comedy cartoons by Andy Riley that depict the various ways bunnies attempt to kill themselves.

== Overview ==
Like its predecessor The Book of Bunny Suicides, it features mostly one-image cartoons, although there are some two- and three-image cartoons.

This book features more Rube Goldberg machines than the first one. However, Riley was drawing more from the British cartoonist W. Heath Robinson, a British contemporary of Goldberg's with a similar interest in implausible machinery. The term "Heath Robinson contraption" is used in Britain, in exactly the way "Rube Goldberg machine" is used in the U.S.

This book also contains more parodies of various recent cultural and historical events of the time. For example, there is one image of a bunny tying himself to Gollum, seeking the ring at the top of the hill, and also a bunny pouring pepper into Sauron's eye from The Lord of the Rings, and an image of the falling Saddam Hussein statue, and a scene with the Doctor (from Doctor Who). The book proved so popular that pirate scans started to circulate heavily online as "Bunnies Suicide" prompting the publisher to send a DMCA request to Google, which was indexing the site and its images.
