= Sherlock Gnomes =

2018 film by John Stevenson

- Theatrical release poster
- Directed by: John Stevenson
- Screenplay by: Ben Zazove
- Story by: Andy Riley; Kevin Cecil; Emily Cook; Kathy Greenberg
- Based on: Sherlock Holmes by Arthur Conan Doyle; Characters by; Rob Sprackling; John Smith; Andy Riley; Kevin Cecil; Kelly Asbury; Steve Hamilton Shaw
- Produced by: Steve Hamilton Shaw; David Furnish; Carolyn Soper
- Starring: James McAvoy; Emily Blunt; Chiwetel Ejiofor; Maggie Smith; Michael Caine; Ashley Jensen; Matt Lucas; Stephen Merchant; Ozzy Osbourne; Mary J. Blige; Jamie Demetriou; Johnny Depp
- Edited by: Prakash Patel; Mark Solomon
- Music by: Chris Bacon
- Production companies: Paramount Animation; Metro-Goldwyn-Mayer Pictures; Rocket Pictures
- Distributed by: Paramount Pictures
- Release dates: March 23, 2018 (United States); May 11, 2018 (United Kingdom)
- Running time: 87 minutes
- Countries: United States; United Kingdom
- Language: English
- Budget: $59 million
- Box office: $97.5 million

Sherlock Gnomes is a 2018 animated mystery comedy film directed by John Stevenson. A sequel to Gnomeo & Juliet (2011), it is based on the detective character Sherlock Holmes. James McAvoy, Emily Blunt, Maggie Smith, Michael Caine, Ashley Jensen, Matt Lucas, Stephen Merchant, and Ozzy Osbourne reprise their roles from the first film, with Johnny Depp, Chiwetel Ejiofor, Mary J. Blige, and Jamie Demetriou joining the cast. The film follows garden gnomes, Gnomeo and Juliet, recruiting gnome detective Sherlock Gnomes to find the missing ornaments from their new garden in London.

The film was released in the United States on March 23, 2018, and in the United Kingdom on May 11, 2018. The film received generally mixed to negative reviews from critics, and nearly underperformed at the box-office, grossing $97.5 million against a production budget of $59 million.

== Plot ==
At London's Natural History Museum, detective gnome Sherlock Gnomes and his assistant, Dr. Gnome Watson, foil their longtime nemesis Moriarty, a pie mascot, who appears to be killed when he is crushed by a dinosaur skeleton. Meanwhile, the garden gnome families, including Miss Montague and Mr. Capulet, relocate from Stratford-upon-Avon to a neglected garden in London. Lady Bluebury and Lord Redbrick appoint Gnomeo and Juliet as new leaders, but the relationship between the gnome couple becomes strained as Juliet ignores Gnomeo in her efforts to repair the garden. While Gnomeo and Juliet are away from the garden, Gnomeo's friend Benny calls him on a walkie-talkie, stating that there is a monster in their garden. The two race back only to find everyone gone. Sherlock and Watson arrive and find a clue card. Juliet and Gnomeo urge the duo to tell them what is going on, and Sherlock reluctantly agrees to let them tag along.

A clue from Moriarty, whom Sherlock believes survived their last encounter, leads them to Chinatown. They find the next clue at Curly Fu's Emporium, and escape a group of guards whom Sherlock had previously offended. They arrive back at the Natural History Museum, where Gnomeo suggests they look inside but Sherlock decides to visit an art gallery instead, as it helps him think. Gnomeo tries to convince him otherwise, but is shocked and hurt when Juliet sides with Sherlock. The couple argue and Gnomeo storms off to the museum with Watson in pursuit. Gnomeo realises that he should not have left Juliet; before he can get back to her, he is kidnapped by a stone gargoyle, who apparently kills Watson. Gnomeo is brought to the rest of the gnomes and informed they will be killed during a fireworks celebration the following evening. Meanwhile, Sherlock figures out the next clue is at the royal park. He and Juliet disguise themselves as a squirrel to get the clue from a pug, and manage to evade the dog on a lawnmower.

Gnomeo attempts to free the gnomes, but only he and the Red Goon Gnomes are able to escape before the gargoyles arrive. The next clue leads Juliet and Sherlock to a doll shop where they meet his resentful former fiancée, Irene, who kicks them out, but allows Juliet back in after she distances herself from Sherlock. Irene gives Juliet the clue, which leads her and Sherlock to Traitor's Gate at the Tower of London. They discover Watson, apparently the true mastermind, who reveals that he pretended to be Moriarty to get through to Sherlock, who never showed respect or appreciation for him, and supposedly has the gnomes in custody, only to find them all missing.

Moriarty is revealed to have survived and plans to crush the gnomes by trapping them in the towers of Tower Bridge, and raising the bridge during a fireworks display. Sherlock, Juliet, and Watson race to the bridge, where they reunite with Gnomeo and thwart Moriarity's plan. Sherlock throws himself at Moriarty, knocking them both over the bridge. Watson narrowly saves Sherlock with his cane grappling hook, where upon Moriarty lands in the water and helplessly floats away.

In the aftermath, the gnomes celebrate their restored garden the following spring, and Sherlock and Watson set off on their next case, having reconciled.

== Voice cast ==
- Johnny Depp as Sherlock Gnomes, a gnome who is Dr. Gnome Watson's friend, and Irene's ex-fiancé. He is the counterpart to Sherlock Holmes.
- Chiwetel Ejiofor as Dr. Gnome Watson, a gnome who is Sherlock Gnomes' friend and assistant. He is the counterpart to Dr. John Watson.
- James McAvoy as Gnomeo, a blue gnome who is Lady Bluebury's son, Juliet's husband, and Benny's best friend. He is the counterpart to Romeo Montague.
- Emily Blunt as Juliet, a red gnome who is Lord Redbrick's daughter, Gnomeo's wife, and Nanette's best friend. She is the counterpart to Juliet Capulet.
- Jamie Demetriou as Moriarty, a pie mascot and Sherlock Gnomes' nemesis. He is the counterpart to Professor James Moriarty.
- Michael Caine as Lord Redbrick, the leader of the red garden gnomes and Juliet's widowed father, who is overprotective of her. He is the counterpart to Lord Capulet.
- Maggie Smith as Lady Bluebury, the leader of the blue garden gnomes and Gnomeo's widowed mother. She is the counterpart to Lady Montague.
- Ashley Jensen as Nanette, a plastic garden frog who is Juliet's best friend, Paris' former girlfriend, and Benny's current girlfriend. She is the counterpart to Nurse.
- Matt Lucas as Benny, an impulsive gnome who is Gnomeo's best friend, Call Me Doll's former boyfriend, and Nanette's current boyfriend. He is the counterpart to Mercutio and Benvolio.
- Stephen Merchant as Paris, a nerdy red gnome who was arranged to marry Juliet. He is the counterpart to Count Paris.
- Mary J. Blige as Irene, a plastic doll who is Sherlock Gnomes' ex-fiancé. She is the counterpart to Irene Adler.
- Ozzy Osbourne as Fawn, a garden deer and counterpart to Peter.
- Julie Walters as Mrs. Montague, the elderly owner of the garden.
- Richard Wilson as Mr. Capulet, the elderly owner of the garden.
- Julio Bonet as Mankini Gnome, a red gnome who wears a mankini.
- Gary Bradbury as Barry, a gnome who sits on a toilet.
- Kelly Asbury as Red Goon Gnomes. They are counterparts to Gregory, Sampson, Anthony, and Potpan.
- Dan Starkey as Teddy Gregson, the counterpart to Tobias Gregson.
- Dexter Fletcher as Reggie, a gargoyle.
- Javone Prince as Ronnie, a gargoyle.
- James Hong as Salt Shaker
- John Stevenson as Big Boy Gorilla
- Stephen Wight as Bridge Operator
- Eve Webster as Mrs. Udderson, Sherlock Gnomes' cow

== Production ==
=== Development ===
In March 2012, it was reported that a sequel to Gnomeo & Juliet was in development at Rocket Pictures. Emily Cook, Kathy Greenberg, Andy Riley and Kevin Cecil—four of the nine writers of the original film—were attached to write the script. Steve Hamilton Shaw and David Furnish returned as producers, with Elton John serving again as executive producer and composing new songs. The sequel would introduce Sherlock Gnomes, described as "the greatest ornamental detective", hired to investigate the mysterious disappearance of gnomes.

In September 2012, John Stevenson, co-director of Kung Fu Panda (2008), was announced as the director. Kelly Asbury, who directed the original film, was unavailable due to his commitments on Smurfs: The Lost Village (2017) for Sony Pictures Animation. However, he remained involved as a creative consultant and voiced the Red Goon Gnomes.

=== Casting ===
In November 2015, Johnny Depp was announced as the voice of Sherlock Gnomes, with the film scheduled for release on January 12, 2018. James McAvoy and Emily Blunt reprised their roles as Gnomeo and Juliet, respectively.

=== Animation ===
Unlike its predecessor, which was animated by Arc Productions, Sherlock Gnomes was animated by Mikros Animation in London and Paris, with additional work by Reel FX Animation in Dallas, Los Angeles, and Montreal. The animation was produced using Autodesk Maya, and character models from the first film were reused. Approximately 60% of the animation crew was in London, with the remainder in Paris. At peak production, the film employed between 80 and 100 animators. Animation director Eric Leighton cited George Pal's Puppetoons as an inspiration of the gnome animation style. Human characters were animated using motion capture, while the end credits sequence was produced by Studio AKA in London.

=== Music ===
Chris Bacon returned to compose the score, as he had on the first film. James Newton Howard, who co-composed the original score, did not return due to his work on Fantastic Beasts: The Crimes of Grindelwald (2018), though he contributed as a music consultant. The film's soundtrack was released by Virgin EMI Records.

== Release ==
Sherlock Gnomes was initially scheduled for release in the United States on January 12, 2018, but in May 2017, it was delayed to March 23, 2018. In the United Kingdom, the film was released on May 11, 2018.

=== Marketing ===
On November 3, 2017, seven teaser posters were released, coinciding with the official shortening of the film's title from Gnomeo & Juliet 2: Sherlock Gnomes to Sherlock Gnomes. The first trailer was released on November 7, 2017. To promote the film, several parody posters were also released spoofing notable 2017 films such as Darkest Hour, The Disaster Artist, The Greatest Showman, The Post, I, Tonya, Guardians of the Galaxy Vol. 2, All the Money in the World, Wonder Woman, and The Shape of Water, each reimagined with gnome-themed titles and characters.

=== Home media ===
Sherlock Gnomes was released on Digital HD on June 5, 2018, followed by Blu-ray and DVD on June 12, 2018.

== Reception ==
=== Box office ===
Sherlock Gnomes grossed $43.2 million in the United States and Canada, and $54.2 million in other territories, for a worldwide total of $97.5 million, against a production budget of $59 million.

In the United States and Canada, the film was released alongside Pacific Rim Uprising, Midnight Sun, Unsane, and Paul, Apostle of Christ. It was projected to gross $13–18 million from 3,600 theaters during its opening weekend, but debuted with a lower-than-expected $10.6 million, finishing fourth at the box office.

=== Critical response ===
On Rotten Tomatoes, Sherlock Gnomes holds an approval rating of 27% based on 67 reviews with an average rating of 4.5/10. The site's critical consensus reads: "Sherlock Gnomes is sadly, utterly stumped by the mystery of the reason of its own existence." On Metacritic, the film has a weighted average score of 36 out of 100 based on 14 critics, indicating "generally unfavorable reviews". Audiences surveyed by CinemaScore gave it an average grade of "B+" on an A+ to F scale.

=== Accolades ===
Award	Date of the ceremony	Category	Recipients	Result	Ref.
Hollywood Music in Media Awards	14 November 2018	Best Original Song in an Animated Film	"Stronger Than I Ever Was" – Elton John and Bernie Taupin	Won	
Golden Raspberry Awards	23 February 2019	Worst Actor	Johnny Depp	Nominated	
Golden Raspberry Awards	23 February 2019	Worst Screen Combo	Johnny Depp & his fast-fading film career	Nominated	

== See also ==
- Gnome Alone, another garden gnome film that was released in 2017
