= The Book of Bunny Suicides =

Collection of black comedy cartoons by Andy Riley

The Book of Bunny Suicides: Little Fluffy Rabbits Who Just Don't Want to Live Any More
- First edition cover
- Author: Andy Riley
- Language: English
- Series: Bunny Suicides
- Genre: Humour
- Publisher: Hodder & Stoughton, Ltd
- Publication date: October 27, 2003
- Publication place: United Kingdom
- Media type: Hardcover
- Pages: 96 pages
- ISBN: 0-340-82899-4 (hardcover)
- OCLC: 59290437
- Followed by: Return of the Bunny Suicides

The Book of Bunny Suicides: Little Fluffy Rabbits Who Just Don't Want to Live Any More (2003) is a collection of mostly one-image black comedy cartoons drawn by author Andy Riley.

== Overview ==
Each cartoon shows one or more white rabbits in their creative attempts to end their lives using a variety of items. Revolving doors, a toaster, a cricket ball, a boomerang, a hand-grenade, the shining sun, a magnifying glass, smoking of several cigarettes, bowling balls and any combination of these are all featured as suicidal tools. The book features a few cultural references, most notably a parody of a scene from The Wicker Man, where the rabbit is atop the burning figure. A reference to the Terminator movies is included, as well as one to the scene from Stanley Kubrick's Dr. Strangelove where the captain of the bomber rides the atomic bomb as it drops and explodes. Noah's Ark is also featured: while all the other animals are boarding the ark, two bunnies stay behind suntanning on the beach. There are also several references to The Lord of the Rings, including a bunny shaking pepper into the eye of Sauron, and a bunny tied between a nail and Gollum reaching for a ring.

The cartoons are often drawn in such a way that the bunny's exact method is not immediately obvious, leaving the reader to work out exactly how the bunnies plan to end their lives.

In 2004 a sequel was published, under the title Return of the Bunny Suicides. The book proved so popular that pirate scans started to circulate heavily online as "Bunnies Suicide" or "Bunny Suicide", facilitating DMCA notices of cease and desist. Cartoonist Liu Gang was inspired by the book to create his Suicide Rabbit. Riley published a third book, Dawn of the Bunny Suicides, in 2010.

The book drew controversy in 2008 at Central Linn High School in Oregon, when a mother refused to return a copy to her son's library, claiming she was going to burn it instead.

In September 2010 the Bunnycides app was released, an iPhone app of the Bunny Suicides series. A series of T-shirts was also begun in 2011.
