= Gordon Berry =

American children's television advisor

Dr. Gordon L. Berry is an American professor and educational consultant on children's television programs. He is a professor emeritus in the Graduate School of Education and Information Studies, as well as the Department of Communication Studies at the University of California, Los Angeles (UCLA). He has been an advisor on numerous children's television programs and animated television series. He was a consultant to CBS for over 20 years, and advised on series such as Fat Albert and the Cosby Kids, Barney & Friends, That's So Raven, and Liberty's Kids.

In the early 1970s, he was hired by CBS as a consultant on children's television content. He assembled a panel of experts for Fat Albert and the Cosby Kids which developed "pro-social" messages in every episode. He also worked with the Children’s Television Workshop, producers of Sesame Street and The Electric Company.
