= Rocket Pictures =

UK film company founded by Elton John

- Logo used since 2018
- Type: Private company
- Industry: Motion pictures
- Founded: 1996; 30 years ago
- Founder: Elton John
- Headquarters: London, England, UK
- Key people: Elton John; David Furnish; Steve Hamilton Shaw
- Website: rocketpictures.co.uk

Rocket Pictures is a British film company founded in 1996 by Elton John to produce family and music-themed film and TV projects.

The company was established in 1996 with a ten-year first-look deal with The Walt Disney Company, a three-year deal with Paramount Pictures and with a current deal with STX Entertainment.

== Filmography ==
=== Universal Pictures ===
- Elton John: Tantrums & Tiaras (1997)
- Women Talking Dirty (1999)

=== Icon Productions ===
- It's a Boy Girl Thing (2006)

=== Walt Disney Studios Motion Pictures ===
- Gnomeo & Juliet (2011)
- Elton John: Never Too Late (2024)

=== Paramount Pictures ===
- Sherlock Gnomes (2018)
- Rocketman (2019)

=== In production ===
- Will Gallows and the Snake-Bellied Troll (TBA)
- N.E.R.D.S. (TBA)
- Joseph and the Amazing Technicolor Dreamcoat (TBA)
