= Made in Hollywood =

- Also known as: Made in Hollywood: Teen Edition
- Genre: Talk show
- Starring: Kylie Erica Mar; Julie Harkness
- Country of origin: United States
- No. of seasons: 21; 20 (Teen Edition)

Production
- Production companies: Connection III Entertainment; Watch Next Media

Original release
- Release: September 30, 2005 – present

Made in Hollywood and its youth-aimed spin-off Made in Hollywood: Teen Edition, are syndicated television series about the entertainment industry produced by Cleveland's company Connection III Entertainment. Both shows feature interviews with actors, directors, and other production team members promoting current and upcoming films. The original Made in Hollywood first aired on September 30, 2005. As of 2026, it has continued for 21 seasons for over 20 years. Teen Edition launched in September 2006.

The Teen Edition has a more educational focus, incorporating information about the technical skills and creative artistry required in the fields of film, television, home entertainment, and music. It complies with FCC guidelines for educational and informative (E/I) content. The education advisor was Dr. Gordon Berry.
