= Michael Cumming =

British director and filmmaker

Michael Cumming is a British director and filmmaker. He is best known for directing comedy shows such as Brass Eye, Toast of London, Toast of Tinseltown, The Mark Thomas Product, Snuff Box, The Mark Steel Lectures and Rock Profile.

After graduating from the Royal College of Art film school in the late 1980s, Cumming began directing at the BBC on Tomorrow's World and then as a freelance director on shows including Lonely Planet, The Word & The Sunday Show before moving into comedy. Brass Eye was his first comedy directing credit.

Alongside comedy directing, Cumming also makes independent films. His 2017 cinema only release – Oxide Ghosts: The Brass Eye Tapes - played to sell out audiences throughout the UK. Cumming's 2021 feature film documentary King Rocker - made with & fronted by Stewart Lee - was praised by Film Critic Mark Kermode as: 'One of my all-time favourite rock docs'. The Observer described it as 'Charming & Experimental' whilst MOJO hailed it as 'Ferociously Entertaining'.

In 2017 Cumming was awarded an honorary doctorate for his outstanding contribution to television & film production. He is a member of BAFTA, Directors UK and the Performing Rights Society.

== Biography ==
=== Early life ===
Cumming was born in Kendal in the county of Westmorland (now Cumbria) and lived in Windermere for the first 19 years of his life. He developed an early interest in music, playing drums in a cabaret duo, jazz trio, punk and post punk bands from the age of 14. He also played bass, guitar and sang lead vocals in several bands between 1976 and 1984. As part of The True Believers, he recorded the single Spider-Man, Spider-Man b/w Spider-Man Meets The Green Goblin at the legendary Strawberry Studios, in Stockport.

His interest in filmmaking started at school in The Lakes School Cine Club, where he made his first films on Super 8. In 2015 Cumming returned to The Lakes School, one of the first purpose-built comprehensive schools in the UK, to make a short film for the 50th Anniversary entitled 'Across A Lake, Below The Hill'.

After a foundation course in Art & Design from Cumbria College of Art and a degree in Fine Art from The University of Wolverhampton, he studied for a Master of Arts degree at the Royal College of Art film school. He graduated, with distinction, in 1987. Whilst at the RCA Cumming made films based on the work of Kurt Vonnegut Jr., John Cage & Eric Wallace who all gave their blessing to his films.

=== Early TV career ===
On graduating from the Royal College Of Art, Cumming began his directing career at the BBC making films for the science show Tomorrows World. This was followed by making kids TV at the Children's Channel with ex Magpie presenter Mick Robertson and running a production company with presenter Gareth Jones, called Better Television. In 1994, Better Television were commissioned to make an afternoon of children's TV for BBC1 to celebrate the 25th anniversary of the Moon landings called An Afternoon On The Moon. In the same year, Better Television also made the space special Over The Moon for Channel 4. Both shows featured Gareth Jones and comedian and impressionist Phil Cornwell.

In 1995, Cumming directed one of the first shows in the long running Lonely Planet travel series, travelling to Brazil with presenter Ian Wright. This was followed by a stint directing the film inserts for the final series of The Word on Channel 4.

=== TV comedy directing ===
Between 1995 and 1997 Cumming directed Chris Morris' satire on current affairs: Brass Eye for Channel 4 and its pilot Torque TV, originally commissioned by the BBC. Cumming has said that, disillusioned with TV, he was considering moving back into more fine-art oriented work until he met Chris Morris: “What Chris did was reassure me there was a way of making something on television that had wider merit. That restored my faith in television”. After Brass Eye, he worked for many years with comedian Mark Thomas, directing five series of his Mark Thomas Product series. Cumming worked with Matt Lucas & David Williams, directing their BBC series Rock Profile as well as directing specials for Bremner, Bird and Fortune, Jack Dee and Kevin Eldon.

In 2000, Cumming directed the award-winning BBC1 comedy Alistair McGowan's Big Impression and the following year, the Tony Roach sitcom World of Pub for BBC 2 starring Phil Cornwell, Kevin Eldon & Peter Serafinowicz.

In 2003, for the newly launched BBC 3, Cumming directed the first series of Three Non Blondes starring Jocelyn Jee Eisen, Tameka Empson and Ninia Benjamin. From 2004 to 2005 he directed 2 series of the BAFTA nominated Mark Steel Lectures as well as two series of The Lenny Henry Show for BBC 1.

Cumming teamed up with Rich Fulcher (The Mighty Boosh) and Matt Berry to make the cult BBC 3 series Snuff Box in 2006. The Guardian described the show as "fantastically dark and cynical". From 2007 to 2009 he directed the Omid Djalili Show for BBC 1, as well as writing material for the series with writing partner Rich Fulcher. During this period Cumming also directed the pilots for several successful series, including: Touch Me, I'm Karen Taylor, The Peter Serafinowicz Show & Stewart Lee's Comedy Vehicle.

Between 2012 and 2015, Cumming was back working with Matt Berry again directing the pilot and all 18 episodes of the multi award-winning Toast of London. As well as winning a Comedy Award and The Rose d'Or, Berry won the best male comedy performer BAFTA for Toast Of London, in 2015. The Independent said of the series: "Berry and co deserve to be celebrated, as this is one of the very few genuinely funny comedy series on TV right now"

In 2016, Cumming Directed the improvised BBC4 comedy series Going Forward starring Jo Brand and Omid Djalili. After a period making independent films, commercials & music videos he returned to TV comedy in 2019/20 & 2021 with Sandylands - a seaside set comedy with a cast including David Walliams, Sophie Thompson, Sanjeev Bhaskar, Hugh Bonneville, Simon Bird & Craig Parkinson. 2022 saw Cumming helm the return of Matt Berry's Toast in a new series – Toast of Tinseltown, described by the Guardian as "an incredibly welcome return for one of the best comic creations of the last 10 years".

=== Filmmaking ===
Cumming has made a number of films for art galleries, exhibiting at the Whitworth Young Contemporaries and the Bracknell, Brighton and Sheffield video festivals. A compilation of his early video artworks is held in the BFI archive and was regularly broadcast on American Cable TV show Here Comes Everybody. His short film Beachcomber, about the Sellafield nuclear re processing plant and made with artist Kevin Carr, was selected for the Sedition show in 2010, the Sea Change exhibition in 2014, Kevin Carr's memorial retrospective at the Florence Mine gallery in 2019 and the Signal Media curated West Coast Retrospective shows at Barrow (2019) & Whitehaven (2020).

In 2017 he made a film to celebrate the 20th anniversary of Brass Eye. Oxide Ghosts:The Brass Eye Tapes featured unseen material from the director's personal archive and played to over 100 sold out cinemas all over the UK and Ireland. The shows featured an introduction and Q&A session from Cumming. The film continues to have occasional screenings and Cumming has made it clear that these live events will be the only way to see the film.

In 2019 Cumming directed the video for the George Ezra track "Pretty Shining People". The promo - featuring a cast of very young record company executives and hipsters - took a gentle swipe at the music business and its marketing of Ezra's image.

Cumming's independent film - King Rocker - in collaboration with comedian & writer Stewart Lee tells the story of Robert Lloyd and the ups and downs of his bands of 40 years The Prefects and The Nightingales. The feature-length documentary premiered on Sky Arts in February 2021, at the Sheffield Documentary Festival and was released in cinemas later that year. Cumming & Lee showed the film at various festivals, including Blue Dot & Glastonbury. In 2024 Cumming announced a director's cut of the film.
