= Saint Monday =

Tradition of absenteeism on a Monday

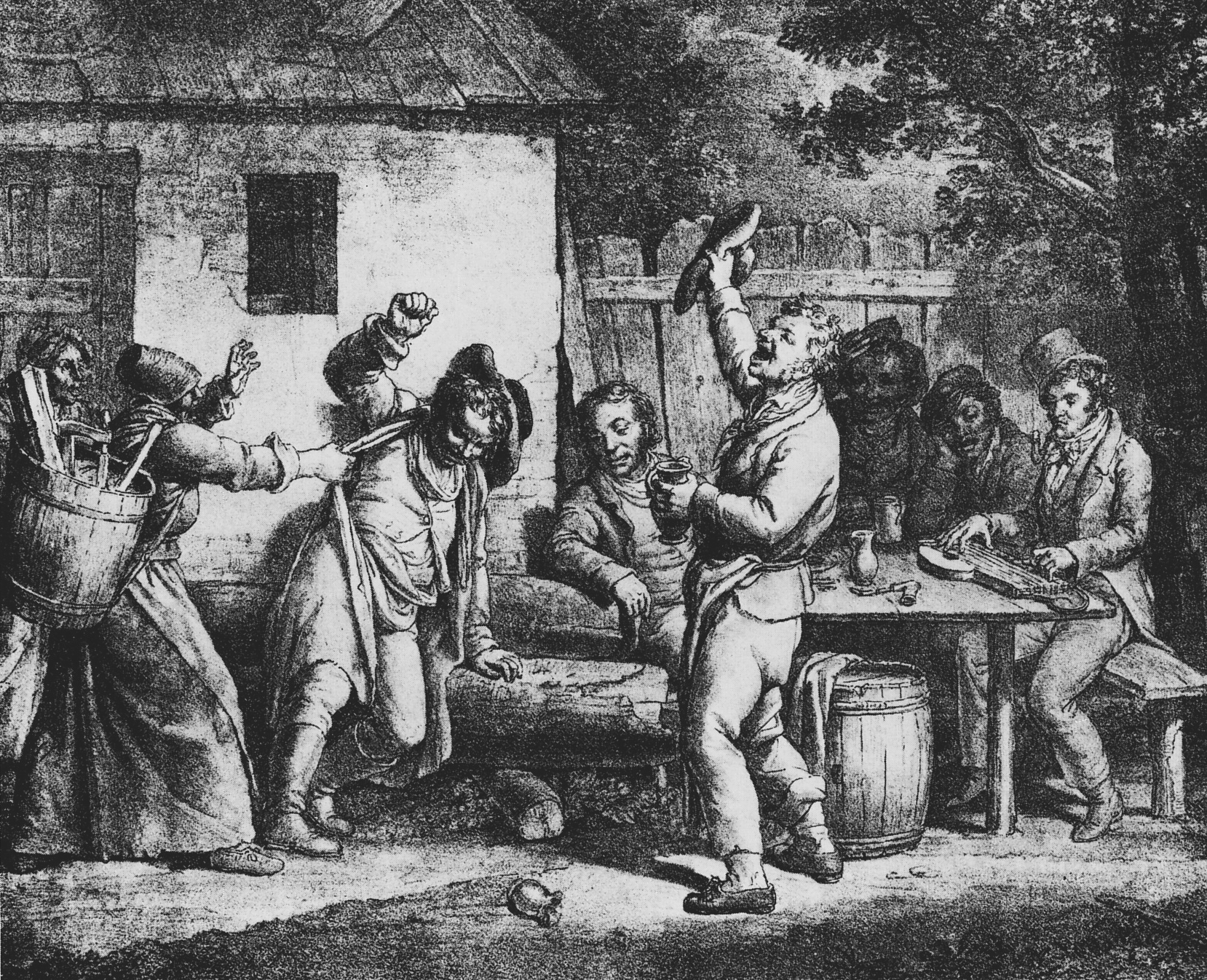
Workers drunkenly celebrate Saint Monday in a tavern in Vienna. Lithograph by Joseph Lanzedelly the Elder, 1818.

Saint Monday is the tradition of absenteeism on a Monday. Saint Tuesday is the less common extension of this to a Tuesday. The tradition of taking Monday off has been common among craft workers since at least the seventeenth century, when the workweek ran from Monday to Saturday as had been the custom and expectation for centuries.

In his autobiography, Benjamin Franklin refers to the practice, saying of his youthful employment in a London printing house, "My constant attendance (I never making a St. Monday) recommended me to the master".

Later writers often ascribed Saint Monday to the organisation and improvement of working class life which occurred with industrialisation. Pay day was typically Saturday, and therefore workers often had spare money on Monday. In other industries, business owners had become accustomed to workers not showing up on Mondays and were prepared to put up with it. Food would commonly be left over from the weekend, thus workers did not need to visit the works canteen, and since many workers were taking the day off, there was often company to be had.

The tradition declined during the nineteenth century, but the provision of entertainments, such as railway excursions, was initially common on Saturday and Monday, and it was not until the middle of the century that workers were able to enjoy a weekend. In part, the decline can be attributed to the adoption of half-day working on Saturdays, which legitimated leisure time for workers.

Saint Monday remained in place longest among the better-off workers, including the self-employed who retained some say in their hours and were not economically compelled to work long hours.

== Cultural references ==
An 18th-century folk song from Sheffield, England, "The Jovial Cutler", portrays a craftsman enjoying a lazy Saint Monday, much to the dismay of his wife:

Brother workmen, cease your labour,
Lay your files and hammers by.
Listen while a brother neighbour
Sings a cutler's destiny:
How upon a good Saint Monday,
Sitting by the smithy fire,
We tell what's been done o't Sunday,
And in cheerful mirth conspire.

Soon I hear the trap-door rise up,
On the ladder stands my wife:
"Damn thee, Jack, I'll dust thy eyes up,
Thou leads a plaguy drunken life;
Here thou sits instead of working
Wi' thy pitcher on thy knee;
Curse thee, thou'd be always lurking
And I may slave myself for thee."

"Ah, the bright, fat, idle devil
Now I see thy goings on,
Here thou sits all day to revel
Ne'er a stroke o' work thou'st done.
See thee, look what stays I've gotten,
See thee, what a pair o' shoes;
Gown and petticoat half rotten,
Ne'er a whole stitch in my hose.

"Pray thee, look here, all the forenoon
Thou's wasted with thy idle way;
When does t'a mean to get thy sours done?
Thy mester wants 'em in to-day.
Thou knows I hate to broil and quarrel,
But I've neither soap nor tea;
Od burn thee, Jack, forsake thy barrel,
Or nevermore thou'st lie wi' me."

Arnold Bennett, in his book Clayhanger, writes, “His master was not a bad man at heart, it was said, but on Tuesdays, after Sunday and Saint Monday, masters were apt to be capricious.”

Magpie Lane recorded a version of "The Jovial Cutler" on their album Six For Gold.

Billy Bragg wrote and recorded a song entitled "St. Monday" on his album England, Half-English, which was also released as a double A-side along with the album's title track.

Mark Thomas supported a call for a return of Saint Monday during an episode of Mark Thomas: The Manifesto.

== See also ==
- Blue Monday (term)
- "I Don't Like Mondays"
- "Manic Monday"
- "Monday, Monday"
