= Eric Wallace (disambiguation) =

Eric Wallace (1938–2004), British reporter, presenter, and film director.

Eric Wallace may refer to:

- Eric Wallace (comics), Final Crisis: Ink, Teen Titans, and Mr. Terrific comic book writer
- Eric Wallace, writer of The Wicked and the Dead
- Eric Wallace (musician) in Black Breath (band)
- Eric Wallace, fictional character in The Closer played by Kyle Gallner
- Eric Wallace, showrunner of The Flash
