= 3 Non-Blondes =

British hidden camera television series

- DVD cover
- Directed by: Michael Cumming
- Starring: Ninia Benjamin; Tameka Empson; Jocelyn Jee Esien
- Country of origin: United Kingdom
- Original language: English
- No. of seasons: 2
- No. of episodes: 19

Production
- Editors: Paul Machliss; Huw Jenkins
- Running time: 30 mins. (approx)

Original release
- Network: BBC Three
- Release: 9 February – 21 December 2003

3 Non-Blondes is a British hidden camera comedy show (and the group name given to the three comedians who star in it), distributed by the British Broadcasting Corporation on the BBC Three digital network channel, first aired in 2003. It also airs on BBC America and Comedy Channel in Australia.

Ninia Benjamin, Tameka Empson and Jocelyn Jee Esien play a range of comical characters to the unsuspecting public, varying from a fictional celebrity named Marcia Brown to a charity worker who only wants a kiss or a hug instead of a cash donation.

Two series of the comedy have been broadcast. Both were released as a DVD box set on 22 November 2004, distributed by Paramount Home Entertainment. In an interview concerning her own sketch show, Little Miss Jocelyn, Jocelyn hinted a third series would probably not be filmed, as the cast had become too well known. The public would either identify them or play along with the sketches, much to the stars' embarrassment.

In 2003, they were listed in The Observer as one of the 50 funniest British comedy acts.

In 2007, Trouble TV picked up the series and showed it on Mondays at 9 pm until the channel got axed.

In 2010, Jocelyn Jee Esien starred in her own spin-off to the show called One Non-Blonde: Down Under, which began to air on 21 September. In it she takes three of her characters on a tour of New Zealand.

In 2023, the series was re-aired on BBC Two.

== Cast and crew ==
- Ninia Benjamin – Herself
- Tameka Empson – Herself
- Jocelyn Jee Esien – Herself
- Gary Reich – Producer
- Michael Cumming – Director (Season 1)
- John F.D. Northover – Director (Season 2)
- Jane Wong – Hidden camera operator
- Lisa Thomson – Hidden camera operator
- Kate York – Hidden camera operator
- Frances Callier – Hidden camera operator
- Kyra Groves – Hidden camera operator
- Angela V. Shelton – Hidden camera operator
- Huw Jenkins – Film editor
- Paul Machliss – Film editor
