= Danny Kushlick =

British political activist

- Born: Southampton, England
- Occupation: Political activist
- Known for: Founder of the Transform Drug Policy Foundation
- Partner: Fi Hance (1999–2020)
- Children: 2

Danny Kushlick is a British political activist and founder of the Transform Drug Policy Foundation (TDPF). He has appeared in British media on many occasions advocating for the legalisation of drug use and the legal regulation of supply. He stood in the 2010 United Kingdom general election for The People's Manifesto.

== Career ==
Kushlick founded the Transform Drug Policy Foundation in 1994, and was the organisation's head of external affairs and director. He left in 2019. He has previously worked with various support organisations, covering learning difficulties, unemployed ex-offenders, drug counselling, and homelessness.

In 2004, he co-authored the report After the War on Drugs: Options for Control, a critique of current drug policy in the UK and recommendations for reform. He is a regular commentator on drug policy in print and broadcast media – including BBC, Guardian, Observer, OpenDemocracy, Chatham House Magazine (World Today).

=== The People's Manifesto ===
In 2010, Kushlick was chosen to stand for Mark Thomas's The People's Manifesto in the 2010 general election in the Bristol West constituency. Kushlick only stood on policy – the legalisation and regulation of drugs – which was drawn from the original manifesto.

At Mark Thomas's show at the Royal National Theatre on 7 April 2010, a selection of policies were directly put forward to Kushlick by members of the audience. In his party platform, Kushlick said he would avoid taking the UK to war, and stated that "the most important 'special relationship' isn't with the US, but with your mum".

Kushlick has also been interviewed and cited by many authors on the subject of drug policy reform.
