= The Mark Thomas Comedy Product =

- Starring: Mark Thomas
- Country of origin: United Kingdom
- Original language: English
- No. of series: 6
- No. of episodes: 45

Production
- Producer: Geoff Atkinson
- Running time: 30 minutes
- Production company: Vera Productions Ltd.

Original release
- Network: Channel 4
- Release: 23 February 1996 – 22 October 2003

The Mark Thomas Comedy Product (from series 2 onwards - known as The Mark Thomas Product) is a television show fronted by the English comedian, presenter, political activist and reporter, Mark Thomas and directed by Michael Cumming. It was broadcast in the UK on Channel 4 from 23 February 1996 to 22 October 2003.

The show, described as "a brilliantly ludicrous alternative to Watchdog", was a hybrid of comedy and serious politics, with Thomas often using silly or surreal methods to gain interviews with politicians and corporations and to highlight issues.

== Episode guide ==
Series	Episode	Broadcast Date	Title	Synopsis
1	1	23/02/1996	"Bear Necessities"	Interviews several MPs dressed as a bear, MTV presenter, bumrush of LiveTV's News Bunny, Jerry Hayes dresses up as a blokes knob.
1	2	01/03/1996	"McDonalds and Mad Saddam"	McFun at McDonald's (in which Thomas purchases 100 50p burgers then sets a burger van up outside to resell them, then turns up in a clown car, with clowns, then a tank and eventually a lorry with a rock band on the back (and gets banned)). Also features ECGD bad debts in Iraq and Nigeria.
1	3	08/03/1996	"Parliament!"	Mark stands for parliament at Hemsworth by-election, gives Malcolm Rifkind some fashion tips.
1	4	15/03/1996	"Tours of London"	Conditionally Exempt Art, phones Tory party central office and upsets them.
1	5	22/03/1996	"MI6 and Birching Young Offenders"	Mark visits MI6, phones the Colombian embassy, loses a few footballs and videos the video voyeur.
1	6	29/03/1996	"Show in a flat"	Mark bets the production budget for the last show on a horse in the 2:30 from Doncaster, loses and has to make the last show of series one in his mate's living room, tries to give cash away at the Bank of England and raises money at the Torython.

Series	Episode	Broadcast Date	Title	Synopsis
2	1	21/01/1998	"Campbell, Fayed and Straw"	Cannabis surgery with Jack Straw, Alistair Campbell's porn past, Mohammed Al Fayed draws his own todger.
2	2	28/01/1998	"Church Money"	Mark probes the ethics of the Church of England's investments and runs a float at the Lord Mayor's show.
2	3	04/02/1998	"Sellafield and Mice"	The friendly face of genetic engineering, DuPont's Onco mouse, radioactive pigeon guano at Sellafield, Burston Marsteller and Mark does his impression of Lord Simon.
2	4	11/02/1998	"Virgin Trains"	Mark runs a promotion on the concourse, relabels a few Virgin trains and gets a song played on Virgin radio.
2	5	18/02/1998	"Lottery"	
2	6	25/02/1998	"New Deal"	Mark investigates the government's "new deal", delivers Pizzas and discusses abortion with the pro-lifers here and abroad.
2	7	04/03/1998	"Number Stations"	Investigates why one of the Rothschilds never paid inheritance tax on their inherited art, Santa goes to the Dome and Mark reveals what the series 2 backdrops are all about.

Series	Episode	Broadcast Date	Title	Synopsis
3	1	13/01/1999	"Arms Fair"	Mark sets up a PR company at an arms fair in Greece and interviews Major General Widjojo from Indonesia. "After discussing with the Major General the Army`s involvement in the massacre of 271 innocent civilians in a churchyard, I spent the afternoon with an Iranian arms dealer talking through whether a mortar bomb could be the solution to moles on my back lawn."
3	2	20/01/1999	"Indonesian Torture"	Mark pitches for PR training for the Indonesian army and has a look at the UK arms export industry and what the DTI lets it get away with.
3	3	27/01/1999	"Geoffrey Robinson"	"Weirder than a goat milkshake" - All about Geoffrey Robinson!
3	4	03/02/1999	"Local Referendums"	Organise your own local referendum, PFI, the NHS and the Air Traffic Control service.
3	5	10/02/1999	"Nuclear Trains"	After the residents of Cricklewood find out they will be getting nuclear waste in their back yard, Mark goes to Dungeness to guard a train carrying nuclear waste and add a little bit of information to the visitors' centre.
3	6	17/02/1999	"Company Directors"	Company directors' home addresses, strikers and electrician safety on the Jubilee line extension.
3	7	24/02/1999	"The Menwith Hill tours"	Mark has a scare whilst hot-air ballooning over RAF Menwith Hill, a US-run listening station in Yorkshire.
3	8	03/03/1999	"Updates"	"a bit of a rag bag of a show" - William Hague at Loughbough University, Mark organises a Labour conference standing ovation, House of Lords attendance, the nutty John Battle, updates on nuclear trains, the DTI and "The showgirls of truth"!
3	9		"Special Report: Asylum and Immigration Bill"	

Series	Episode	Broadcast Date	Title	Synopsis
4	1	21/09/1999	"Burma & Premier Oil"	Human rights in Burma, Premier Oil and Robin Cook.
4	2	28/09/1999	"Iraqi Sanctions"	Mark tried to take a sanctions busting teddy bear to Iraq, a beanie baby to the Whitehouse and featured a woman with a price on her head for saving lives.
4	3	05/10/1999	"Nestle"	Nestle and baby milk action !
4	4	12/10/1999	"Aldermaston AWE"	In this show Mark Thomas cast his critical all-seeing eye on things nuclear, and took a peek over the fence at the Atomic Weapons Establishment at Aldermaston, and unexpectedly became the first programme since the 1970s to be invited to film an interview from within the base.
4	5	19/10/1999	"ECGD"	The Export Credit Guarantee Department and their role in arms dealing.
4	6	06/01/2000	"David Shayler"	Mark met David Shayler, found out about his own MI5 file, enlisted some acrobatic mailmen, came face to face with Jack Straw, investigated the lack of accountability of the intelligence services, and the lunacy of the Official Secrets Act.
4	7	13/01/2000	"PPL human Milk Production"	Human milk from cows and more Nestle baby milk action.
4	8	20/01/2000	"Xenotransplantation"	Pig's heart or pig's ear? This week, Mark looked at the wacky world of xenotransplantation and found out how politicians may be playing God.
4	9	27/01/2000	"ECGD (Ilisu Dam)"	ECGD spending out of control and the Ilisu dam in Turkey.
4	10	03/02/2000	"Government Accountability"	Law enforcement under Jack Straw, freedom of information, visiting Pinochet and the Cambridge 2, imprisoned for 5 years under section 8 of the misuse of drugs act.
4	11	10/02/2000	"Series Updates"	Series round up and a day out at the Millennium Dome.

Series	Episode	Broadcast Date	Title	Synopsis
5	1	08/01/2001	"CCTV & the Data Protection Act"	The data protection act and the CCTV competition.
5	2	15/01/2001	"MEP's Interests"	The register of MEPs interests and how they are lobbied.
5	3	22/01/2001	"Michael Meacher"	THE UK MP's register of interests.
5	4	29/01/2001	"Pester Power"	In this show Mark investigated corporate advertising and arranged a debate about conditions in clothing factories in Indonesia between the global affairs director of Adidas, union activists from Jakarta and Richard Howitt MEP in a school where Year 9 students were able to ask questions of the senior Adidas representative in charge of global marketing.
5	5	05/02/2001	"Balfour Beatty"	ECGD Revisited and The Ilisu dam.
5	6	12/02/2001	"Tube Privatisation"	PPP and the London Underground.
5	7	19/02/2001	"Series Updates"	Series updates and William Hague's speaking fees.

Series	Episode	Broadcast Date	Title	Synopsis
6	1	27/03/2002	"Organophosphates"	Illegal pesticides used in UK via legal loophole.
6	2	03/04/2002	"Drug Dumping"	Corporations dumping expired drugs in poor countries for tax breaks.
6	3	10/04/2002	"Corporate Killing"	Corporate killing and the Simon Jones case.
6	4	17/04/2002	"Yusufeli Dam"	More dams, Ilisu and Yusefeli, Balfour Beatty and AMEC.
6	5	24/04/2002	"Quango State"	Quangos, transparency, accountability and the select committee.
6	6	01/05/2002	"Arms Dealing"	How to become an arms dealer in 8 days.

Specials	Broadcast Date	Title	Synopsis
	06/03/1999	"Thomas Country"	Mark poses as a right-wing farmer who infiltrated genuine farming conferences to investigate the true aims and ambitions of the Countryside lobby.
	29/05/2002	"Mark Thomas' Secret Map of Britain"	Mark Thomas draws up a map of Britain that reveals the places the government and the establishment do not want the public to know about, disproves the claim that the government is an 'open' institution, and looks at the secret democracy that Britain really is.
	31/01/2003	"Mark Thomas, Weapons Inspector"	Mark assumes the role of a weapons inspector and attempts to uncover British and American weapons of mass destruction.
	22/10/2003	"Mark Thomas, Debt Collector"	Post war Iraq is bust. The country owes $383,000,000,000 to various companies, banks and countries from loans/credit which it took to build palaces, buy weapons and such. Mark Thomas decides to try to help out by taking it onto himself to try to raise money to help them out.
