= The Omid Djalili Show =

- Genre: Sketch comedy; Stand-up comedy
- Directed by: Michael Cumming
- Starring: Omid Djalili
- Theme music composer: Afro-Cuban All Stars
- Country of origin: United Kingdom
- Original language: English
- No. of series: 2
- No. of episodes: 12 (list of episodes)

Production
- Executive producer: Kenton Allen
- Running time: 30 minutes
- Production company: Hat Trick Productions

Original release
- Network: BBC One
- Release: 17 November 2007 – 25 May 2009

The Omid Djalili Show is a British sketch comedy/stand-up comedy television show produced by the BBC and directed by Michael Cumming. Writing by Omid Djalili, Will Smith, Roger Drew, Ian Stone, Ricky Grover Michael Cumming, Rich Fulcher and Ivor Dembina (series one) with script editor Steve Punt. The theme tune is a piece of Salsa music called "Amor Verdadero", performed by the Afro-Cuban All Stars.

It was first broadcast on 17 November 2007 in the network's primetime Saturday night slot.

It is also broadcast in Australia on ABC1, in Denmark on DR2, in Estonia on ETV2 in 2010, in Israel on yes stars Comedy, in Germany on WDR and in Portugal on RTP2.

The second series was recorded late 2008 and was first broadcast on 20 April 2009 on BBC One.

== Episode list ==
=== Series 1 ===
| # | Title | Airdate |
|---|---|---|
| 1 | Episode 1 | 17 November 2007 |
| 2 | Episode 2 | 24 November 2007 |
| 3 | Episode 3 | 1 December 2007 |
| 4 | Episode 4 | 8 December 2007 |
| 5 | Episode 5 | 15 December 2007 |
| 6 | Episode 6 | 28 December 2007 |

=== Series 2 ===
| # | Title | Airdate |
|---|---|---|
| 1 | Episode 1 | 20 April 2009 |
| 2 | Episode 2 | 27 April 2009 |
| 3 | Episode 3 | 4 May 2009 |
| 4 | Episode 4 | 11 May 2009 |
| 5 | Episode 5 | 18 May 2009 |
| 6 | Episode 6 | 25 May 2009 |
