= Eric Wallace =

English news reporter, presenter, and independent director

Eric Wallace (16 July 1938 – 28 April 2004) was a reporter and presenter for Border Television and an independent film director in Cumbria, England. He was born in Carlisle and spent his whole life there. For over twenty years, he was the main anchor of the regional news programme, Lookaround.

== Broadcasting career ==
At the age of 27, Wallace left his first job at McVitie's biscuit factory in Carlisle (where he had worked for ten years) to take a three-year course in Film and Television at the College of the Venerable Bede at Durham University. On graduating, he joined Border Television on 9 September 1968 as a news reporter - he would remain at Border for the next 30 years, presenting Lookaround and many of the station's regional programmes, including his own chat show Wallace.

After his retirement, he returned to make a number of guest and cover stints as a Lookaround presenter and reporter, until illness prevented him from doing so in 2002. Upon leaving Border, Wallace freelanced at BBC Radio Cumbria, presenting a Saturday morning show.

== Independent film career ==
Whilst working for Border TV, Wallace - an ardent film enthusiast - directed, produced and funded several independent films including Strange Company (1972 - a portrait of Lindsay Kemp and Jack Birkett), I Can Lick Any Girl in the House (1976 - a pseudo-biography of female wrestler Mitzi Mueller) and Stimmung (1987 - a homage of German expressionism films).

For Border, he also wrote and presented a profile of director Ken Russell, and as an arts enthusiast, he played the role of a newsreader for Ian Breakwell's video work, The News, in 1980. Wallace himself was the subject of a 1986 film, The One and Only, produced by Michael Cumming, (Brass Eye, King Rocker, Toast Of London) then a film student at the Royal College of Art, London.

== Death ==
Eric Wallace died at Carlisle's Eden Valley Hospice on 28 April 2004 from cancer. He was 65 and had been married for 40 years with two children, five grandchildren and two great-grandchildren.

That night's edition of Lookaround broke the news of Wallace's death and featured an extensive tribute. Following the tribute, anchorwoman and close friend Fiona Armstrong wept openly on air.
