= Paul Machliss =

Australian film and television editor (born 1972)

- Born: 1972 (age 53–54); Melbourne, Victoria, Australia
- Education: Brighton Secondary College
- Occupations: Film editor; television editor
- Years active: 1990–present

Paul Machliss (born 1972) is an Australian film and television editor. He has worked on TV series such as Black Books and The IT Crowd, as well as on Edgar Wright's television series Spaced and feature films Scott Pilgrim vs. the World (2010), The World's End (2013), and Baby Driver (2017).

== Early life ==
Machliss was born in Melbourne, Victoria, Australia, and is a graduate of Brighton Secondary College.

== Career ==
He got his start working as a gofer on Fast Forward, an Australian sketch comedy series. He went to work in a post-production facility, serving as a videotape librarian and operator. While at this job, Machliss taught himself how to use the company's editing suite, allowing him to get a job editing advertisements and corporate videos. He then worked freelance on a trade show in Amsterdam, after which he relocated to the UK and worked as an online editor for several post-production facilities. From there, he was hired as a freelance editor to work on British television series, including Spaced and Black Books. His work on these series got him a job editing Scott Pilgrim vs. the World, directed by Edgar Wright, in 2010. In 2013, he served as the editor for The World's End, also directed by Wright. In July 2023 Machliss was awarded an Honorary Doctorate of Arts by Solent University.

== Filmography ==
Credits adapted from Machliss' agency website.

=== Film ===
Year	Title	Notes
2004	Rabbit Fever	
2006	The It To The Fishes	Short Film
2010	Scott Pilgrim vs. the World	With Jonathan Amos; Won - San Diego Film Critics Society Award for Best Editing; Nominated – Eddie Award for Best Edited Feature Film – Comedy or Musical; Nominated – Online Film Critics Society Award for Best Editing; Nominated - International Cinephile Society Awards; Nominated - International Online Cinema Awards; Nominated - Online Film & Television Association; Nominated - Gold Derby Awards
2013	The World's End	
2015	Man Up	
2017	Baby Driver	With Jonathan Amos; Won - BAFTA Award for Best Editing; Won - Chicago Film Critics Association Award for Best Editing; Won - San Diego Film Critics Society Award for Best Editing; Won - San Francisco Film Critics Circle Awards 2017; Won - Washington D.C. Area Film Critics Association Awards 2017; Won - Critics' Choice Movie Award for Best Editing (tied with Lee Smith (film editor) for Dunkirk (2017 film)); Won - St. Louis Gateway Film Critics Association Awards 2017; Won - Los Angeles Online Film Critics Society Awards; Won - Las Vegas Film Critics Society Awards; Won - Phoenix Film Critics Society Awards; Won - International Online Cinema Awards; Won - Columbus Film Critics Association; Won - Online Film & Television Association; Nominated - Satellite Award for Best Editing; Nominated – Academy Award for Best Film Editing; Nominated - Alliance of Women Film Journalists; Nominated – Eddie Award for Best Edited Feature Film – Comedy or Musical; Nominated - Seattle Film Critics Society; Nominated - Awards Circuit Community Awards; Nominated - Gold Derby Awards (2018 for Film Editing & 2020 for Film Editing Of The Decade); Nominated - Hawaii Film Critics Society
2019	The Kid Who Would Be King	With Jonathan Amos
2020	The Gentlemen	With James Herbert
2021	Last Night in Soho	Won - 5th Hollywood Critics Association Film Awards; Won - St. Louis Gateway Film Critics Association Awards 2021; Won - Hawaii Film Critics Society; Nominated - BFE Cut Above Awards; Nominated - Music City Film Critics Association
2023	The Flash	With Jason Ballantine
2025	The Running Man	
2026	The Sheep Detectives	With Martin Walsh and Al LeVine
2027	How To Train Your Dragon 2	
TBA	The Collaboration	

=== Television ===
Year	Title	Notes
1997	Dispatches (TV programme)	One episode
2000	The Junkies	Pilot
2000	The David Beckham Story	Documentary
2001	Live in Paris (Diana Krall album)	Live Concert
2000–03	Comedy Lab	Four episodes
2001	Noble and Silver	Two episodes
2001	Spaced	Four episodes
2002	New Order 511	Concert
2002	Cancun	Pilot
2002–04	Black Books	12 episodes
2003	Led Zeppelin DVD	Madison Square Garden co-editor
2003	The Real Nasser Hussain	Documentary
2003	3 Non-Blondes	Nine episodes
2003	Grass	Eight episodes
2005	Look Around You	Six episodes
2005	The Smoking Room	Four episodes
2005	Mike Bassett: Manager	Six episodes
2006–08	The IT Crowd	18 episodes
2006	Life Begins	Three episodes
2007	Fear, Stress & Anger	Six episodes
2007	City Lights	Three episodes
2007	The Peter Serafinowicz Show	Six episodes
2008	Whites	Pilot
2008	Peep Show	Three episodes
2008	How Not to Live Your Life	Six episodes
2011	Come Fly on the Wall	Documentary
2011	Deeper Understanding	Music Video
2011	Comedy Showcase	Episode: "Chickens"
2011	Yeah Yeah - Dylan Moran Live At The Apollo	Also as Director
2011–12	Threesome	14 episodes
2012	Live at the Electric	Three episodes
2012	The Hour	Two episodes Nominated - Online Film & Television Association (Shared with Gareth C. Scales, Xavier Russell and Nick Arthurs)
2014	Friday Night Dinner	Six episodes
2015	Brotherhood	Eight episodes
2015	Fungus the Bogeyman	Three episodes
2016	Fleabag	First episode
