= List of Rock Profile episodes =

Here is a list of episodes in Matt Lucas and David Walliams' comedy show Rock Profile.

== Series one (1999–2000) ==
| No. overall | No. in series | Title | Original release date |
|---|---|---|---|
| 1 | 1 | "Wham!" | 25 December 1999 |
George Michael, played by Lucas, discusses his upcoming single called 'A Finger Of Fudge', and talks of how it represents a difficult time in his life. Andrew Ridgeley turns up, played by Walliams, and still believes Wham! are musically active and asks George why he has not returned any of his calls. He thinks George's only solo hit is Careless Whisper. Andrew talks about Wham! despite the fact that the group finished years ago.
| 2 | 2 | "Steps" | 1 January 2000 |
Lee (Walliams) and 'H' (Lucas) are opening an art exhibit, however Theakston discovers that they have not asked for permission and have just turned up with their pictures and blu-tack. Their art consists of a Steps poster with the three girls scribbled out. The two appear to have childish mentalities, and claim to live with their parents.
| 3 | 3 | "Michael Jackson" | 8 January 2000 |
Michael Jackson, played by Walliams, is interviewed in his home and wants to convince Theakston that he is a normal person. He also shows his dancing to the host, and talks about his time with the Jackson 5. Elizabeth Taylor (Lucas) turns up and defends Michael Jackson. They both appear to have strange habits, such as sitting on bread and simultaneously lifting their legs up and shouting religious buildings at Theakston.
| 4 | 4 | "Kula Shaker" | 15 January 2000 |
Crispian Mills (Walliams) is portrayed as a schoolboy, being interviewed in his classroom. He claims that Kula Shaker was started as a school project. His teacher, Ratty Paxton (Lucas), continually interrupts the interview, and is infuriated by the fact that Theakston has not done his homework.
| 5 | 5 | "Simon and Garfunkel" | 22 January 2000 |
Paul Simon (Lucas) and Art Garfunkel (Walliams) are reunited for a final time. However, their differences seem uncontrollable as they soon resort to calling each other names and use curtains and walls to separate each other.
| 6 | 6 | "The Prodigy" | 29 January 2000 |
The Prodigy do not actually appear in this episode. Instead, Theakston meets a couple outside his house who are stalking Keith Flint. The couple end up splitting when the wife (Walliams) spends a ludicrous amount of money on a gift for Keith, causing the husband (Lucas) to leave.
| 7 | 7 | "Boy George & Marilyn" | 5 February 2000 |
Both Boy George (Lucas) and Marilyn (Walliams) believe that they are really women and behave like bored teenagers, enticing Jamie to shop lift, and make up lies about him having sex with Marilyn and making her pregnant. Boy George bears a marked similarity to Little Britain's Vicky Pollard.
| 8 | 8 | "Eurythmics" | 12 February 2000 |
Dave Stewart (Lucas) is portrayed as a mad scientist who claims to have created Annie Lennox (Walliams) —a creature similar to that from Mary Shelley's Frankenstein — from parts of corpses.
| 9 | 9 | "Gary Barlow" | 19 February 2000 |
Gary Barlow (Lucas) and Howard Donald (Walliams) from boy band Take That dream of reforming the band. Gary is portrayed as a mean-spirited bully, upon whom the childlike Howard waits hand and foot.
| 10 | 10 | "Kylie and Dannii Minogue" | 26 February 2000 |
Kylie (Walliams) is tricked into having her first interview alongside her sister Dannii (Lucas). The pair show an obvious dislike and jealousy towards each other.
| 11 | 11 | "The Beatles" | 4 March 2000 |
Paul McCartney (Lucas) is portrayed as a meat-eater, George Harrison (Lucas) speaks with an Indian accent and talks about his bizarre political views and movie ideas, and Ringo Starr (Walliams) believes he is Thomas the Tank Engine's representative on Earth.
| 12 | 12 | "Prince" | 11 March 2000 |
Prince's (Lucas) career has collapsed, and he is now homeless, living on the streets of Glasgow, although the episode is very obviously set in Shepherd's Bush in London.
| 13 | 13 | "Oasis" | 18 March 2000 |
The meek Liam Gallagher (Walliams) is kept under the thumb of ultra-posh housewife Patsy Kensit (Lucas).

== Series two (2000–2001) ==
| No. overall | No. in series | Title | Original release date |
|---|---|---|---|
| 14 | 1 | "Happy Mondays" | 24 December 2000 |
Drugged-out Shaun Ryder (Walliams) and classically trained dancer and musical star Bez (Lucas) discuss their roots, daily living routine and a rather nice package holiday they went on.
| 15 | 2 | "Take That" | 31 December 2000 |
A Take That reunion is planned at Gary Barlow's room at the YMCA. While waiting for the others, Barlow, Theakston and Howard Donald play the Take That board game. It seems only Barlow and Howard Donald will attend until Robbie Williams (Paul Putner) arrives at the party, prompting a game of Pass the Parcel. The party is a let down and ends with Gary shouting at Theakston and Williams.
| 16 | 3 | "Tom Jones and Shirley Bassey" | |
| 17 | 4 | "Elton John" | 14 January 2001 |
Elton (Lucas) is self-centred and abusive towards Theakston and David Furnish (Walliams). He appears to be unaware of world events, guessing the price of a loaf of bread is £80. His catchphrase is a petulant "Right! I'm leaving!". Lucas later went on to interview Sir Elton in a sketch for a Comic Relief episode of Little Britain.
| 18 | 5 | "Duran Duran" | 21 January 2001 |
The band lose and change members with every new scene between the music played in the episode. They highlight their rivalry with Spandau Ballet, while correctly claiming they had no hits in the 1990s unlike themselves. Jamie however cannot recall "Ordinary World", despite all three members of the band singing it together, with Simon Le Bon (played by David Walliams), saying "Guitar solo" etc. for the instrumental parts of the song and "Repeat chorus". They even sing the fade-out, by repeating the last line over and over getting quieter each time they sing it. Simon Le Bon even says "Fade-out" before they sing the line, only for Jaimie to say he still does not know it. The version of "Ordinary World" they perform sounds like it is sung in an a cappella style.
| 19 | 6 | "Steps" | 28 January 2001 |
The male members of Steps are again portrayed as children. They plan to launch a range of Steps merchandise including the 'Steps Knife'. They talk of their showbiz party in McDonald's and seemingly mock Theakston throughout the interview, referring to him as 'Jamie Squeakston'.
| 20 | 7 | "Bucks Fizz" | |
| 21 | 8 | "The Chemical Brothers and Air" | 11 February 2001 |
The Chemical Brothers appear as desperately lonely figures, sitting mutated and socially incapable in their caravan, picking out which novelty LPs to put on at their next show. Air, meanwhile, are displayed as mysterious French philosophers living in a bizarre never-never land.
| 22 | 9 | "ABBA" | 18 February 2001 |
Benny and Björn believe their songs were very political, like that Dancing Queen was actually about communism. They get confused who was married to which and there is a short lived reunion.
| 23 | 10 | "George Michael and Geri Halliwell" | 25 February 2001 |
George ( Walliams) returns for an interview after his first was hijacked by Andrew Ridgely. However, Geri Halliwell (Lucas) consistently interrupts and expresses her love for George, despite his assertions that he is gay.
| 24 | 11 | "U2" | |
| 25 | 12 | "Blur" | 11 March 2001 |
Damon Albarn (Lucas) attempts to portray himself as a cockney with a working-class background; however it is clear that the interests he professes are unfounded, such as his nominal knowledge of football. Alex James is shown as confused about a lot of things, such as his sexuality and alcoholism. Graham Coxon (Walliams) is a terrifyingly deranged firestarter and Theakston cannot think of anything interesting about Dave Rowntree (Lucas). At the end of the episode the band perform their "new single", which parodies the low-key Blur sound while Damon sings about his former girlfriend Justine Frischmann from the band Elastica, saying they are "crap" at the end of the chorus, before then going into an upbeat Blur style song, with Graham blocking his ears. The song then ends with a rendition of the Chitty Chitty Bang Bang theme song.
| 26 | 13 | "The Bee Gees" | 18 March 2001 |
In allusions to the band's infamous appearance on the Clive Anderson show, the Bee Gees conduct a steely interview, whereby Barry (Walliams) is in charge and the others will only speak with his permission. Barry Gibb appears to resemble the Cowardly Lion from The Wizard of Oz.

== Series three (2009) ==
| No. overall | No. in series | Title | Original release date |
|---|---|---|---|
| 27 | 1 | "Peter Andre and Jordan" | 4 February 2009 |
Dermot O'Leary interviews Peter Andre about his new Greatest Hits album and accompanying tour, which has one date in Crawley. Peter's wife, Jordan, then arrives asking why he's being interviewed without her, and spends the duration of the interview making fun of the size of his penis. Dermot then talks to Jordan about her new autobiography, which she then reads in its entirety. Peter and Jordan then discuss what they would ask the Queen, before Jordan proclaims she's written another book - this one a very risque children's book about a pony.
| 28 | 2 | "Amy Winehouse and Pete Doherty" | 11 February 2009 |
Dermot interviews Amy Winehouse and Pete Doherty about teaming up to release a new charity single together. Once he finally gets them talking, Amy can only call out for her husband, Blake, and Pete seems oblivious to his break-up with Kate Moss. They then spend the remainder of the part boasting about their drug taking exploits. Pete and Amy then appear to be in some confusion as to what an Anti-Drug campaign is, and the two perform their new single, which is revealed to be a cover of Grange Hill's 'Just Say No'.
| 29 | 3 | "Chris Martin and Gwyneth Paltrow" | 18 February 2009 |
| 30 | 4 | "Kerry Katona and Mark Croft" | 25 February 2009 |
| 31 | 5 | "Ronnie Wood and Mick Jagger" | 4 March 2009 |
| 32 | 6 | "Cheryl Cole and Nicola Roberts" | 11 March 2009 |
Miquita Oliver stands in for Dermot to talk with the Girls Aloud members. Miquita talks to Cheryl about her past year, including climbing Mount Kilimanjaro for Comic Relief and her success on The X Factor. They discuss the other X Factor judges, and address Cheryl's supposed rivalry with Dannii Minogue, with Cheryl defending Dannii by saying "People forget that she had a top 20 hit in 1991, and she has Kylie Minogue's phone number".
