= King Rocker =

2020 film

- Film poster
- Directed by: Michael Cumming
- Written by: Stewart Lee
- Produced by: James Nicholls
- Release dates: June 2020 (Sheffield Doc/Fest); 6 February 2021
- Running time: 90 minutes
- Country: United Kingdom
- Language: English

King Rocker is a 2020 British documentary film directed by Michael Cumming and written by Stewart Lee about the singer Robert Lloyd and his bands, The Prefects and The Nightingales. It premiered at the 2020 Sheffield Doc/Fest, before being shown on Sky Arts, with its premiere on the network being on 6 February 2021.

King Rocker features Frank Skinner, Kevin Eldon, Marc Riley, Robin Askwith, and Paul Morley, with archive footage included of John Peel, Ted Chippington and We've Got a Fuzzbox and We're Gonna Use It. The latter two appeared with Lloyd/The Nightingales on the British Children's pop programme Razzmatazz, performing the single credited to The Vindaloo Summer Special in 1986.

The film was produced by James Nicholls, who was one of the people behind music documentary The Ballad of Shirley Collins (which also featured Lee). The film also features a statue of King Kong by Nicholas Monro.
