= The People's Manifesto =

Political satire book by Mark Thomas

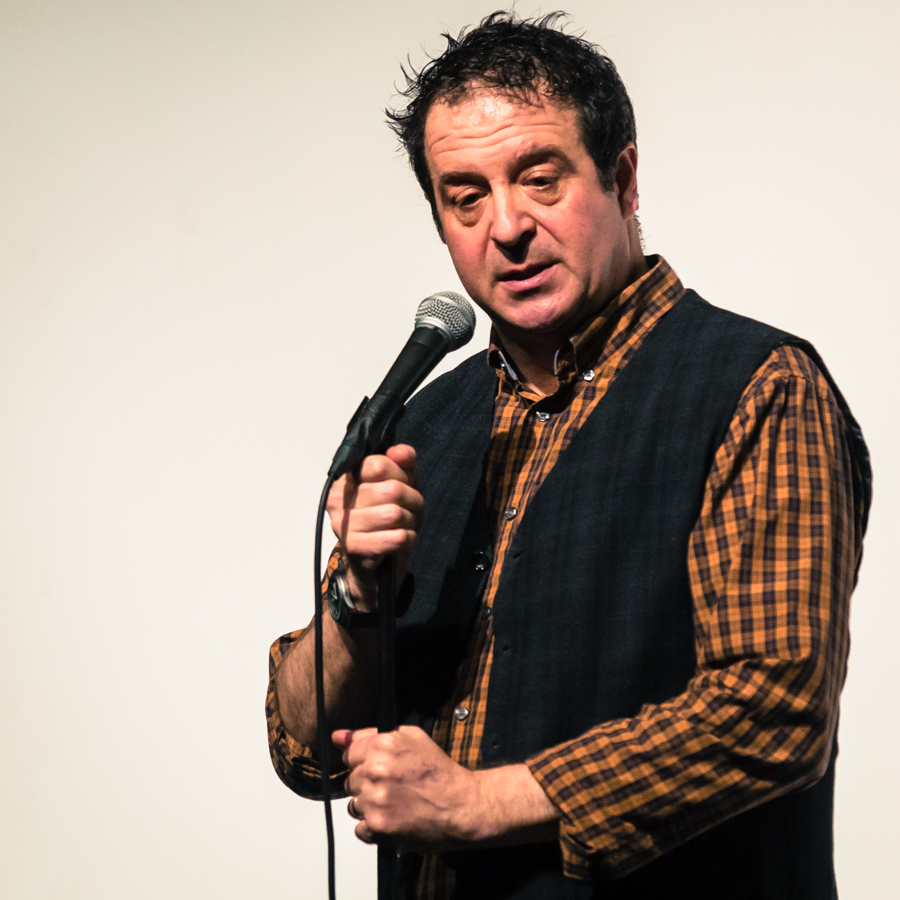
Mark Thomas

The People's Manifesto is a comedic and satirical political manifesto, based on an idea by the British satirist and political activist Mark Thomas, and created by his audiences. The manifesto is made up of policies suggested and voted for by members of the public who attended Thomas's stand-up performances. Thomas himself would then go and campaign on the winning policies. As well as forming part of his stand-up shows, the idea transferred to radio, being broadcast as Mark Thomas: The Manifesto on BBC Radio 4. A book of the best policies was published on 28 January 2010, entitled Mark Thomas Presents The Manifesto. Thomas then announced a contest to find someone to stand in the 2010 UK General Election based on the manifesto policies. The winner of the competition, Danny Kushlick, stood in Bristol West and finished sixth out of seven candidates, winning 343 votes, which was 0.6% of the vote.

== Tour ==
The Manifesto formed a part of Thomas stand-up tour entitled It's The Stupid Economy. Before the show and during the interval people wrote down their ideas for policies, with help from the campaign group NO2ID. Thomas would then go through the policies, deciding which ones would be considered for the manifesto and which ones should be immediately rejected. At the end of the show, the public were asked to vote for the best policy by shouting out loudly in support of the policies, the winning one being formed as part of the manifesto.

Thomas said in an interview with The List: "People innately have lots of solutions. It sounds like an obvious thing, but everyone thinks that they can be Prime Minister; everyone thinks that they can do a better job. They certainly think they can do a better job than their MP. Everyone has opinions, and that was how the manifesto show was born. Instead of politicians telling us what we should do, it should be the other way round."

The tour began on 27 March 2009 and finished after the 2010 General Election. Amongst the policies included in the manifesto are:

- "Margaret Thatcher should pay for her own funeral."
- "The introduction of a maximum wage."
- "Introduce a USA-style 1st Amendment, to protect free speech."
- "Party political manifestos should be legally binding."
- "Anyone in favour of banning immigration should sign a register and they will be banned from travelling abroad."
- "On the voting card there should be a box that says 'None of the above.'"
- "That Windsor be renamed Lower Slough."
- "We should build 100,000 council houses a year."
- "The Daily Mail should have to declare on the masthead 'The newspaper that supported Hitler!'"
- "There should be a public referendum before going to war."

In August 2009, Thomas performed his show at the Edinburgh Festival Fringe, in which the winning policies during the Fringe were debated before a selection of Members of the Scottish Parliament.

== Radio show ==
A two-part radio series based on the People's Manifesto, entitled Mark Thomas: The Manifesto was broadcast on BBC Radio 4 on 25 June and 2 July 2009. The winning policies in these shows were, "Reform the role of Whips in parliament", and, "Banning bottled water and making drinking fountains etc more wide-spread via standpipes." A second series began on 4 February 2010. Winning policies so far include "Re-instate Saint Monday". By 2013, there had been five series.

== Book ==
A book containing a selection of the policies, entitled Mark Thomas Presents The People's Manifesto, was published by Ebury Press on 28 January 2010, ISBN 978-0091937966.

== 2010 UK general election ==
To promote Mark Thomas Presents The People's Manifesto, a competition was organised by Thomas and Ebury Press to find a person to stand in the 2010 general election as an independent candidate, based on the policies listed in manifesto. The person selected as the candidate would be paid their £500 deposit to stand in the election, in addition to £500 to cover campaign expenses, and would be supported by Thomas during the campaign.

It was announced on 1 April 2010 that the winner was Danny Kushlick, the founder and director of Transform Drug Policy Foundation. He stood in the constituency of Bristol West. The policies that Kushlick campaigned on were:

- "Drugs will be legalised and their production will be nationalised (and Mark Thomas will become the 'Drug Tsar')."
- "If it pisses down with rain on a bank holiday, it will be considered a rollover."
- "Trident will be scrapped."
- "Newspaper retractions will be printed in the same font size and on the same page as the offending article."
- "A cap will be put on house prices, relative to the average wage in the area (and more council houses will be built in these areas)."
- "People who complain there are too many immigrants will be banned from restaurants serving anything other than British food."
- "The railways will be re-nationalised."
- "The introduction of a 'maximum wage'."
- "The introduction of a Tobin tax on all currency transactions."
- "All ministers will have had experience of their ministry prior to taking office."

Kushlick finished sixth out of seven candidates, losing to Stephen Williams MP of the Liberal Democrats, Paul Smith of Labour Party, Nick Yarker of the Conservative Party, Ricky Knight of the Green Party and Christopher Lees of UK Independence Party. Kushlick received a total of 343 votes, winning 0.6% of the share of the vote. He defeated one candidate: Jon Baker of the English Democrats Party.
