= Rock Profile =

British television comedy show

- DVD cover of the Rock Profile series 1-2
- Genre: Satire
- Created by: Matt Lucas; David Walliams
- Written by: Matt Lucas; David Walliams
- Directed by: Michael Cumming
- Presented by: Jamie Theakston (Series 1–2); Dermot O'Leary (Series 3); Miquita Oliver (Series 3); Vernon Kay (2022 special)
- Starring: Matt Lucas; David Walliams
- Country of origin: United Kingdom
- Original language: English
- No. of seasons: 3
- No. of episodes: 31 (list of episodes)

Production
- Running time: 10-45 mins

Original release
- Network: UK Play (series 1); BBC Two (series 2); Funny or Die UK (series 3); BBC One (2022 special)
- Release: 25 December 1999 – 18 March 2022

Related
- Little Britain; Come Fly with Me

Rock Profile is a British television comedy show written by and starring comedy partnership Matt Lucas and David Walliams, both later widely known for the sketch show Little Britain. Directed by Michael Cumming, Rock Profile first appeared on the channel UK Play in 1999, before moving to BBC Two in 2000. The show was revived for a one-off special for Comic Relief in 2022.

The show comprises a series of spoof interviews, involving Jamie Theakston questioning Lucas and Walliams who play famous musicians. The interviews are often bizarre and involve broad, unflattering caricatures or fictional characteristics. They are often interspersed with videos by the featured artist, including humorous captions and congratulations from other impersonated celebrities.

== Broadcast history ==
The first series was broadcast in 1999, comprising 13 episodes, on digital channel UK Play. The series was then picked up by BBC Two, with a second series of 13 episodes following in 2000. Series one was later shown on BBC Two. In November 2001, a special 45-minute episode of the series was broadcast, entitled Rock the Blind. The episode followed Gary Barlow (Lucas) and Ronan Keating (Walliams) as they recorded a charity single. Ted Robbins appeared as Pete Waterman, and Sara Cox as herself. Following the episode, the series saw a break of two years.

In October 2001, several sketches were featured in the re-launch of Top of the Pops, entitled The All-New Top of the Pops. All of the sketches were filmed backstage, featuring characters which had appeared in the previous two series. People who were unaware of the show at the time did not understand the segments and complaints were made regarding the sketch with Lucas as Elton John, where he was verbally harassed by an audience member. The sketch was subsequently cut from all future repeat screenings of the episode, it now can only be seen as an extra on the DVD release. Due to recent events regarding Walliams, it is now likely all the segments will be cut from any repeat of the episode.

In 2009, a third series was recorded by Walliams and Lucas and was made available on the website Funny or Die for free viewing. The third series replaced host Jamie Theakston with new host Dermot O'Leary. The first episode aired virally on 11 May 2009, and featured a mock interview with Jordan and Peter Andre. A one-off special aired as part of Comic Relief Red Nose Day 2022, with Vernon Kay as host interviewing Lucas and Walliams portraying Michael Ball and Alfie Boe, Adele, Billie Eilish, Lady Gaga, Lewis Capaldi, Miley and Billy Ray Cyrus, and Post Malone.

== Examples of musicians parodied ==
- Shirley Bassey (Lucas) and Tom Jones (Walliams) – Shirley Bassey is portrayed as claiming to have more hits than she actually does. Jones is portrayed as a befuddled has-been who confuses the names of other artists who have told him he was "the greatest singer of his generation."
- ABBA are reluctantly reunited after interviews with Benny Andersson & Björn Ulvaeus.
- Boy George (Lucas) and Marilyn (Walliams) – Both characters are portrayed as thinking they are female and Marilyn claims interviewer Jamie Theakston has made him pregnant and that he needs to provide for his baby.
- Ringo Starr (Walliams) – Ringo Starr is portrayed as believing himself to be Thomas the Tank Engine's representative on Earth. He claims that Thomas has asked him to do both good and bad things.
- Simon & Garfunkel – Simon (Lucas) and Garfunkel (Walliams) are portrayed as hating each other, and both try to prove that they are more successful than the other. They use a curtain and even a brick wall to separate themselves.
- Bono (Walliams) – Bono is portrayed as an irritating Englishman who loves to phone Salman Rushdie and can't understand why his fellow U2 bandmates persist in speaking with an Irish accent. The Edge (Lucas) points out that it is because they are Irish.
- Elton John (Lucas) – Elton John is portrayed as a moody, temperamental prima donna.
- George Harrison (Lucas) – George Harrison is portrayed as speaking with a strong Indian accent and keeps a poppadum in his top pocket, yet cannot understand why people keep talking about his Indian influences. He also produces bizarre films plots; for example: one man's love for his sandal.
- Lee and H from Steps (Walliams and Lucas respectively) are portrayed as five-year-olds.
- Liam Gallagher (Walliams) – Liam Gallagher is portrayed as a foul-mouthed house husband whose wife, Patsy Kensit (Lucas), constantly embarrasses him and ruins his 'hard-man' image by exposing him as a friend of Mary and Jeffrey Archer.
- Barry Gibb of the Bee Gees is portrayed as a bully who bosses his brothers Maurice (Lucas) and Robin around. In the episode, Barry resembles the Cowardly Lion from The Wizard of Oz. He even has a tail.
- Blur – Damon Albarn (Lucas) is portrayed as a Cockney working-class hero, who says his life is like the musical Oliver. Alex James (Walliams) is portrayed as being very confused about many things, such as his sexuality.
- Geri Halliwell (Lucas) – Geri Halliwell is portrayed as a patronising moron who stalks and has delusions about marrying George Michael (played by both Lucas and Walliams on separate occasions). According to Geri, everything is "Girl Power". "All base metals, Girl Power. The River Nile, Girl Power. Clive Anderson, dictionary definition of Girl Power".
- Paul McCartney (Lucas) – Paul McCartney is portrayed as fed up with people asking about his solo career. He announces "People keep asking me... what's the hidden message at the end of 'Simply Having a Wonderful Christmas Time'?... Y'know, 30 years ago I was in a band called The Beatles... but no one ever wants to talk about that!" When Theakston, overjoyed at Paul's apparent willingness to talk about the Beatles, questions him on John Lennon, McCartney soberingly muses "Y'know the saddest thing? No one ever mentions him."
- Eurythmics – Dave Stewart (Lucas) is portrayed as a mad scientist who claims to have created Annie Lennox (Walliams) – who is portrayed as a creature similar to that from Mary Shelley's 'Frankenstein' – from parts of corpses.
- Happy Mondays – Bez (Walliams) is portrayed as a professionally trained dancer who went to the Ramhurst School, claiming that he was in the year above Darcey Bussell. Shaun Ryder (Lucas) is portrayed as mumbling, incoherent and an unenthusiastic interviewee.
- Gary Barlow (Lucas) and Howard Donald (Walliams) from boy band Take That – Gary Barlow and Howard Donald are portrayed as constantly thinking about reforming the band. Gary is portrayed as a mean-spirited bully and Howard portrayed as childlike. When Theakston asks Gary if he still speaks to Robbie Williams, Gary responds "Yeah, I phone Robbie up every week – don't tell him it's me though".
- Graham Coxon (Walliams) – Graham Coxon (of Blur) is portrayed as a musically inept, paranoid pyromaniac who speaks in hushed tones until he categorically states he didn't "start the fire".
- Andy Warhol (Lucas) – Andy Warhol is portrayed as living in a flat with Lou Reed (Williams). Reed asks Warhol what he wants for his tea, to which Warhol replies "chippy". Reed then goes into a long explanation about how he had chippy for his lunch and can't have it twice. Warhol replies "Yeah, I know", and a catchphrase was born. "So what do you want then?", to which Warhol replies: "Chippy". This sketch evolved into the characters Lou and Andy in Little Britain.
- Kylie Minogue (Walliams) and her sister Dannii Minogue (Lucas) – The sisters are portrayed as being extremely jealous of each other and during their interview take great pride in pointing out each other's failures. Dannii tells Kylie, "the whole family was so proud when your last single went to number 27 in the charts".
- Prince (Lucas) – Prince is portrayed as an alcoholic Glaswegian tramp, performing his hits on acoustic guitar and harmonica as a busker. Although the introduction to the episode claims he is living in Glasgow, he is busking on the Uxbridge Road in London's Shepherd's Bush.

== Reception ==
Rock Profile has been well received by critics. Radio Times described the show as "truly silly and truly inspired". Sunday Mirror described it as "excellent comedy".

== DVD release ==
Both original series of Rock Profile was released on DVD in 2005, which also included Rock the Blind and the sketches made for TOTP and The Ralf Little Show; all commercial music was excised from the DVD version of the series.
