= Ilısu Dam Campaign =

The Ilısu Dam Campaign was a UK-based campaign working to stop the construction of the Ilısu Dam on the river Tigris in south east Turkey. The construction plans for the dam would lead to the flooding of about 300 square kilometers and would displace up to 78,000 people from the Hasankeyf district of the Batman province.

== Initial plans for the dam ==
The main purpose of the dam is the production of hydroelectric power, but it's also supposed to provide better irrigation for local agriculture. Those who oppose the dam claim that human rights and environmental issues have been disregarded in the planning. The dam would also lead to the drowning of hundreds of archeological sites, including the ancient town of Hasankeyf.

The Swedish based Skanska, withdrew from the project in September 2000. In November 2001 the campaign won an important victory when it achieved that the UK based company Balfour Beatty decided to withdraw from the Ilısu Dam project due to ethical, environmental and economical concerns. The companies involved in the project had applied for Export Credit Guarantees from their home governments, which meant that taxpayers money would be used to finance the project.

== Current plans ==
The plans for the dam were not scrapped however, and in 2005 the project resurfaced. This time one of the main contractors of the dam was Austria-based VA TECH, a subsidiary of Siemens AG. According to the Turkish government, new resettlement plans were planned and a large fund was supposed to be set up to rescue some parts of the town of Hasankeyf by moving them elsewhere. According to the opponents of the dam, these new plans do not adequately address their original concerns.

Construction of the dam began in 2006 and was completed in 2018.

== See also ==
- Mark Thomas British comedian and journalist, Chairman of the campaign
- Three Gorges Dam a controversial dam project in China
- Southeastern Anatolia Project
- Aswan High Dam a dam that caused a comparable loss of archaeological sites
