= Berardo Collection Museum =

Museum of art in Portugal

- Museu Colecção Berardo
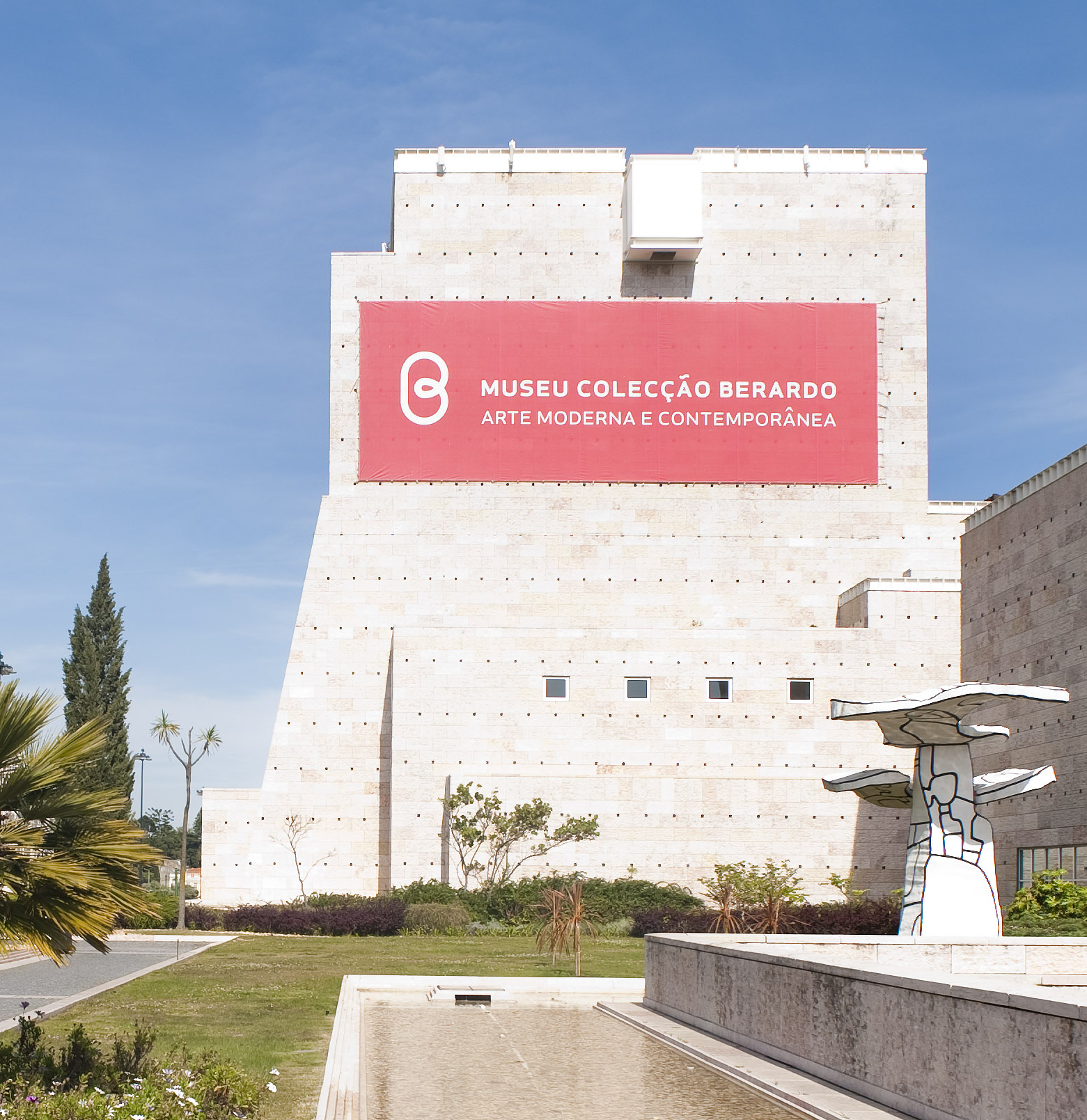
- Outside view of the museum
- Interactive fullscreen map
- Established: 2007
- Dissolved: 2022
- Location: Praça do Império, Belém, Lisbon
- Coordinates: 38°41′44″N 9°12′30″W
- Type: Modern and contemporary art
- Visitors: 1,006,145 (2016)
- Director: Pedro Lapa
- Curator: Rita Maria de Figueiredo Sales Lougares
- Website: museuberardo.com

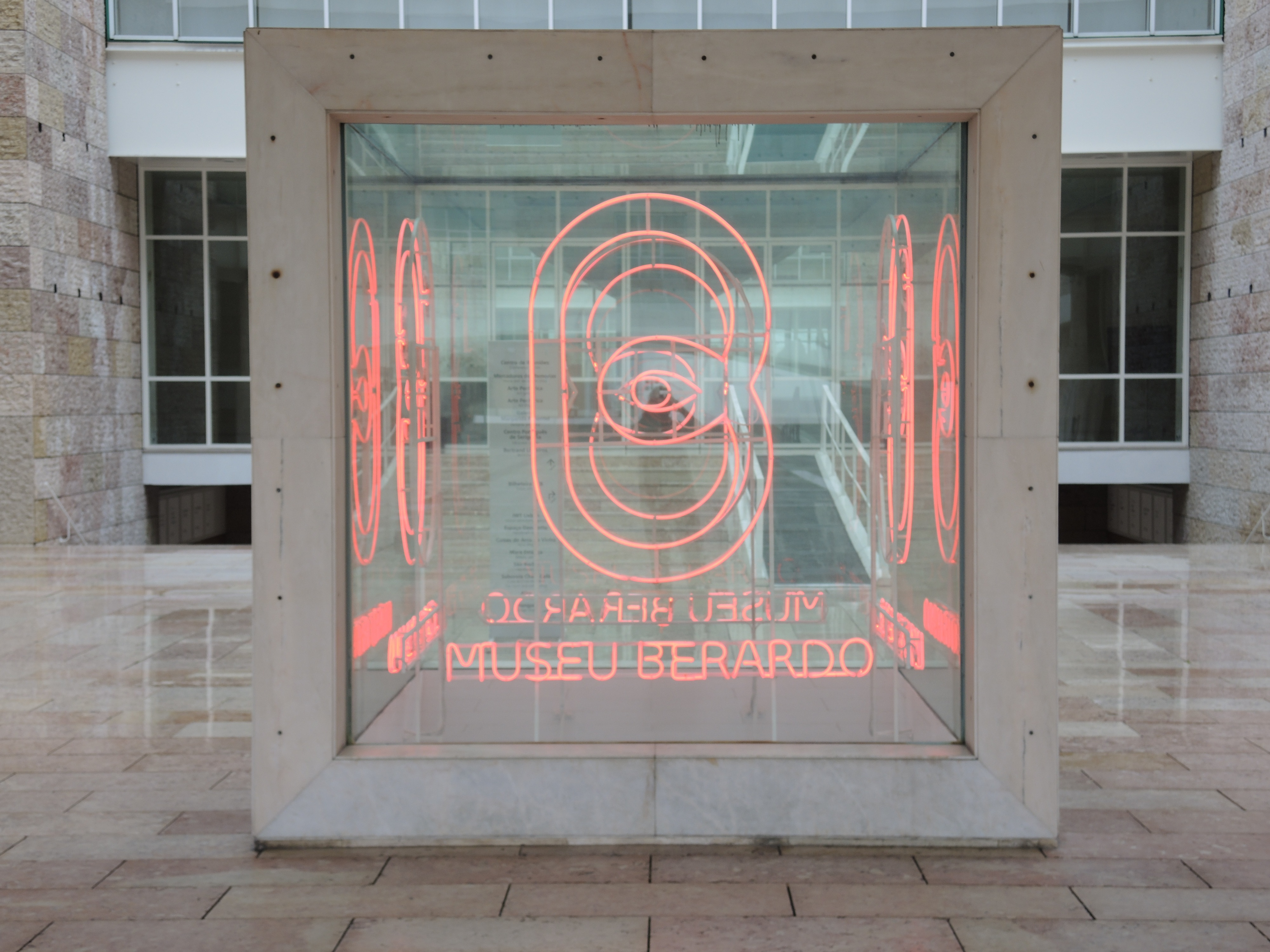

The Berardo Collection Museum (in Portuguese: Museu Colecção Berardo) was a museum of modern and contemporary art in Belém, a district of Lisbon, Portugal. It was replaced by the Contemporary Art Museum - Centro Cultural de Belém in January 2023.

== History ==
In 2006, after 10 years of negotiations, José Berardo signed an agreement with the Portuguese government to loan art from his collection on a long-term basis to the Centro Cultural de Belém in Lisbon. Under the partnership agreement the Portuguese state incurs the costs of displaying Berardo's collection. The art holdings themselves are owned and managed by a company known as the Berardo Collection Association. The museum was formally initiated as the Foundation of Modern and Contemporary Art on August 9, 2006 (Decree-Law 164/2006). It was inaugurated on June 25, 2007 and is named after Berardo and his collection. At the time, auction house Christie's valued the exhibited works at around 316 million euros ( million). While the contract is still in force, however, the Berardo Collection Association may not sell cultural goods. The agreement was renewed in 2017 giving the Portuguese government the option to purchase works from the collection until the agreements ends in late 2022.

Since its opening, the collection was located at the Exhibition Center of the Centro Cultural de Belém, with over 1,000 works of art on permanent display and temporary exhibitions. From its opening until April 2011, the museum's art director was Jean-François Chougnet, who was then replaced by Pedro Lapa.

The Berardo Collection was seized by the Portuguese state in 2019 after Berardo failed to pay three Portuguese banks the more than $1 billion debt that he owed. The artworks were placed as collateral for the bank loans. From 2023, parts of the collection became part of the inaugural presentation at the Museum of Contemporary Art in the Belém Cultural Center (CCB).

== Collection ==
The collection was arranged in strictly linear fashion, leading visitors though a line of line of rooms with austere white walls on which are displayed examples of notable works of modern art with explanatory text offering a textbook-like survey of modern Western art from surrealism to pop art, hyper-realism, minimalist art to conceptual art in chronological order.

The museum had an extensive permanent collection and also hosts temporary exhibitions that change on a regular basis. The permanent collection is valued by the auction house Christie's at €316 million.

=== List of important movements and artists ===
==== Abstract Expressionism ====
- Philip Guston, Untitled, 1957
- Joan Mitchell, Lucky Seven, 1962
- Lee Krasner, Visitation, 1973
- Sam Francis, Untitled, 1979
- Willem de Kooning, Untitled, c. 1976
- Lee Krasner, Visitation, 1957

==== Abstraction-Création ====
- Georges Vantongerloo, SXR/3, 1936

==== Action Painting ====
- Jackson Pollock, Head, 1941
- Franz Kline, Sabro, 1956

==== Body Art ====
- Cindy Sherman, Untitled (Film Still Nº37), 1979

==== Constructivism ====
- El Lissitzky, Kestnermappe Proun, Rob. Levnis and Chapman GmbH Hannover, 1923
- Aleksandr Rodtsjenko, Portrait V. Majakowski, 1924

==== Cubism ====
- Albert Gleizes, Woman and Child, 1927
- Pablo Picasso, Tête de Femme, c.1909

==== De Stijl ====
Piet Mondrian, Tableau (yellow, black, blue, red and grey), 1923

- Vilmos Huszár, Untitled, 1924
- Georges Vantongerloo, Studies I, 1918

==== Digital Art ====
- Robert Silvers, JFK, 5/6, 2002

==== Experimental Art ====
- Ana Hatherly, O Pavão Negro, 1999

==== Geometric Abstraction ====
- Nadir Afonso, Marcoule, 1962

==== Kinetic Art ====
- Pol Bury, Mélangeur, 1961
- Alexander Calder, Black Spray, 1956
- Jean Tinguely, Indian Chief, 1961

==== Minimal art ====
- Carl Andre, 144th Travertine Integer, 1985
- Richard Artschwager, Trunk, 1964
- Larry Bell, Vertical Gradient on the Long Length, 1995
- Anthony Caro, Fleet, 1971
- Dan Flavin, Untitled (Monument to Vladimir Tatlin), 1964
- Ellsworth Kelly, Yellow Relief with Blue, 1991
- Sol LeWitt, Eight Sided Pyramid, 1992
- Richard Serra, Point Load, 1988
- Frank Stella, Hagamatana II, 1967
- Agnes Martin, Untitled #5, 1989

==== Neo-Expressionism ====
- Georg Baselitz, Blonde ohne Stahlhelm- Otto D. (Blonde Without Helmet - Otto D.), 1987
- Anselm Kiefer, Elisabeth von Österreich, 1991
- Gerhard Ritchter, Abstraktes Bild, 1987

==== Neo-Plasticism ====
- Piet Mondrian, Composition of Yellow, Black, Bleu and Grey, 1923

==== Neo-Realism ====
- Mário Dionísio, O Músico, 1948

==== Op art ====
- Bridget Riley, Orient IV, 1970
- Victor Vasarely, Bellatrix II, 1957

==== Photography ====
- Pepe Diniz, various works
- Jemima Stehli, various works
- Manuel Casimiro, Cidade 1, 1972
- Victor Palla, various works

==== Photorealism ====
- Tom Blackwell, Gary's Hustler, 1972
- Robert Cottingham, Dr. Gibson, 1971
- Don Eddy, Toyota Showroom Window I, 1972

==== Pop art ====
- Clive Barker, Fridge, 1999
- Peter Blake, Captain Webb Matchbox, 1962
- Jim Dine, Black Child's Room, 1962
- Richard Hamilton, Epiphany, 1989
- David Hockney, Picture Emphasizing Stillness, 1962
- Edward Kienholz, Drawing for the Soup Course at The She She Cafe, 1982
- Phillip King, Through, 1965
- Roy Lichtenstein, Interior with Restful Paintings, 1991
- Tom Wesselmann, Great American Nude #52, 1963
- Nicholas Monro, ???
- Claes Oldenburg, Soft Light Switches 'Ghost' Version, 1963
- Sigmar Polke, Bildnis Helmut Klinker, 1965
- Mel Ramos, Virnaburger, 1965
- James Rosenquist, F-111, 1974
- George Segal, Flesh Nude behind Brown Door, 1978
- Andy Warhol, Campbell's Soup en various other works, 1965
- Evelyne Axell, L'Oeil de la Tigresse, 1964
- Mark Lancaster, various works

==== Realism ====
- Philip Pearlstein, Two Figures, 1963

==== Suprematism ====
- Kasimir Malevich, Suprematism: 34 Drawings, 1920
- Ljoebov Popova, various compositions

==== Surrealism ====
- Eileen Agar, Snake Charmer, 1936
- Hans Bellmer, La Toupie, 1956
- Gerardo Chávez, Vogteren Fro Fortides Kaos, 1979
- Salvador Dalí, White Aphrodisiac Telephone, 1936
- Julio González, Femme au Miroir Rouge, Vert et Jaune, 1936
- André Masson, Eleusis, 1963
- Pablo Picasso, Femme dans un Fauteuil, 1929
- Man Ray, Café Man Ray, 1948
- Paule Vézelay, Les Ballons et les Vases, 1934
- Paul Delvaux, Le Bain des Dames chez George Grard (S. Idesbald), 1947
- Fernando Lemos, various works

== Fees ==
Admission was €5, visits to some of the temporary exhibitions may have an additional charge.

== Location, access and facilities ==
The museum was located in the Belém Cultural Center, being the center of the modern cultural life of Lisbon. Across the street, is the Mosteiro dos Jerónimos.

== Sources ==
- Museu Colecção Berardo, Portuguese Wikipedia.
