= King Kong statue =

Sculpture by Nicholas Monro

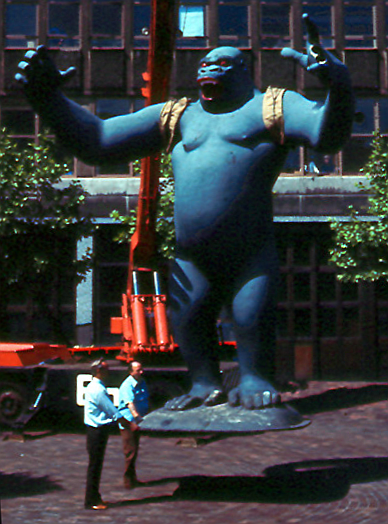
- The statue, in its original colours, being temporarily exhibited at Gosta Green in Birmingham in 1975
- Artist: Nicholas Monro
- Year: 1972
- Type: Statue
- Medium: Fibreglass
- Subject: King Kong
- Dimensions: 550 cm (220 in)
- Weight: 890 kg (1,960 lb)
- Owner: Lesley Maby

A statue of King Kong by Nicholas Monro was commissioned in 1972 for display in Manzoni Gardens in The Bull Ring, in the centre of Birmingham, England. It was later displayed elsewhere in Birmingham, then at markets in Edinburgh, Penrith (where it was subsequently stored), at the Henry Moore Institute in Leeds, and now in the owner's garden in Cumbria.

The Arnolfini Gallery in Bristol owned a maquette of the statue which is now in the collection of Wolverhampton Art Gallery.

== History ==
=== Birmingham ===
Modelled on the fictional giant gorilla King Kong, the fibreglass statue was commissioned for display in Birmingham from March to November 1972, by the Peter Stuyvesant Foundation for the Sculpture for Public Places Scheme "City Sculpture", in partnership with the Arts Council of Great Britain.

The statue is 5.5 metres (18 ft) tall and weighs 890 kg (1,960 lb). It was constructed at the artist's studio at Hungerford. Monro's brief was to make something "city orientated" and he said that he "immediately thought of King Kong".

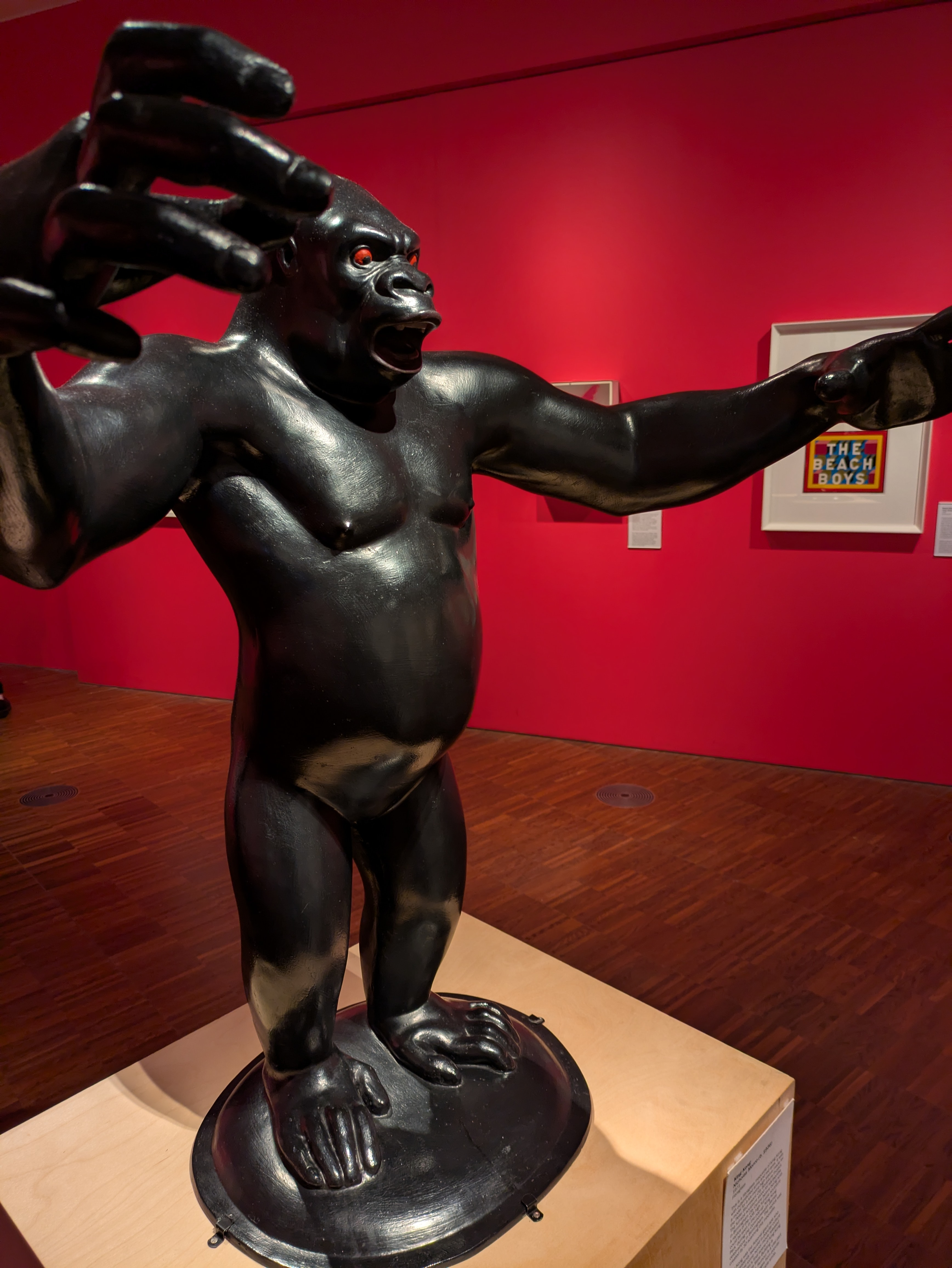
The maquette in Wolverhampton Art Gallery in 2024

The statue was displayed in Manzoni Gardens (previously the site of Birmingham Market Hall; now subsumed beneath the Bullring shopping mall). On 14 July 1972 it was "occupied" by two flying pickets, who were protesting about low wages in the building industry as part of the national builders' strike. They sat on its shoulders and hung from its neck a banner reading "King Kong says nothing less than £30 for 35 hours and up your T.P.I."

After the statue had been on display for four months, Birmingham City Council was offered the opportunity to purchase the work at a reduced rate of £2,000, but decided not to retain it, and so in September 1972, it was sold for £3,000 to a local used-car dealer, Mike Shanley, who changed the name of his dealership to King Kong Car Co. and displayed the statue at his sales lot on the A34 Stratford Road, next to the former Holy Trinity church in the Camp Hill area of the city. While there, it was dressed up as Father Christmas in season, and it also survived a fire in June 1974.

During 1975 it was loaned to Birmingham School of Architecture, between 30 June and 3 July, as a symbol for the 'City of the Future' symposium which took part at the Gosta Green campus.

By 1976, the statue had moved to a new location on Ladypool Road, Sparkbrook, close to the Clifton Road junction. It stood at the rear face of the Clifton public house. It was still being used to advertise a King Kong cars dealership at this location and Mike Shanley was still the owner of this business.

=== Edinburgh ===
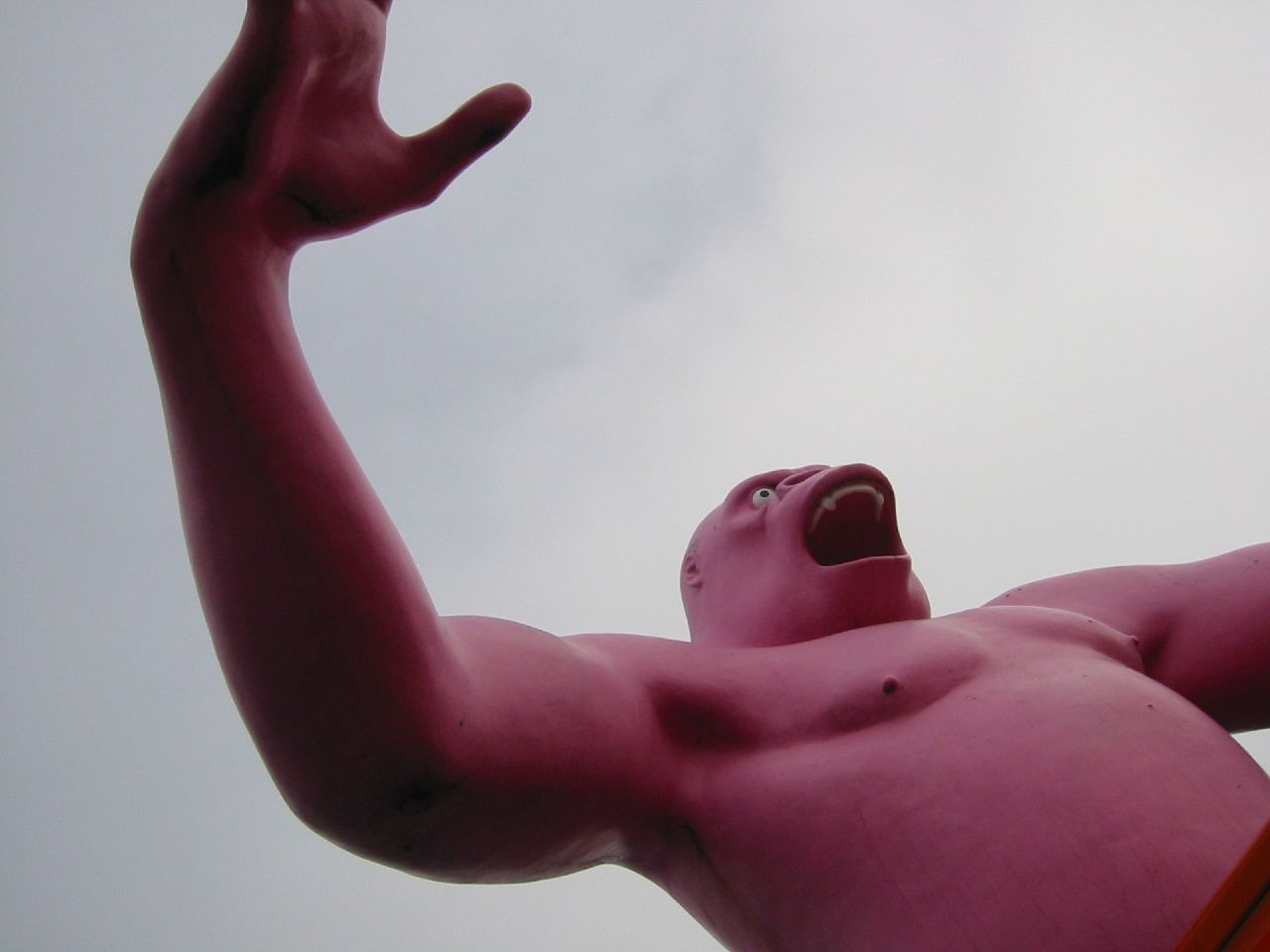
The statue in Edinburgh in March 2005, painted pink

In 1976, it was sold for £12,700 to Nigel Maby's Scottish company Spook Erection Ltd and displayed at Ingliston Market in Edinburgh. During that period, it was falsely reported destroyed, and repainted several times, including once in tartan, and, in 2001, in shocking pink. Before removal from Edinburgh on the closure of that market in 2005, the statue suffered damage by vandals to its back, and a broken arm, requiring repair.

=== Penrith ===
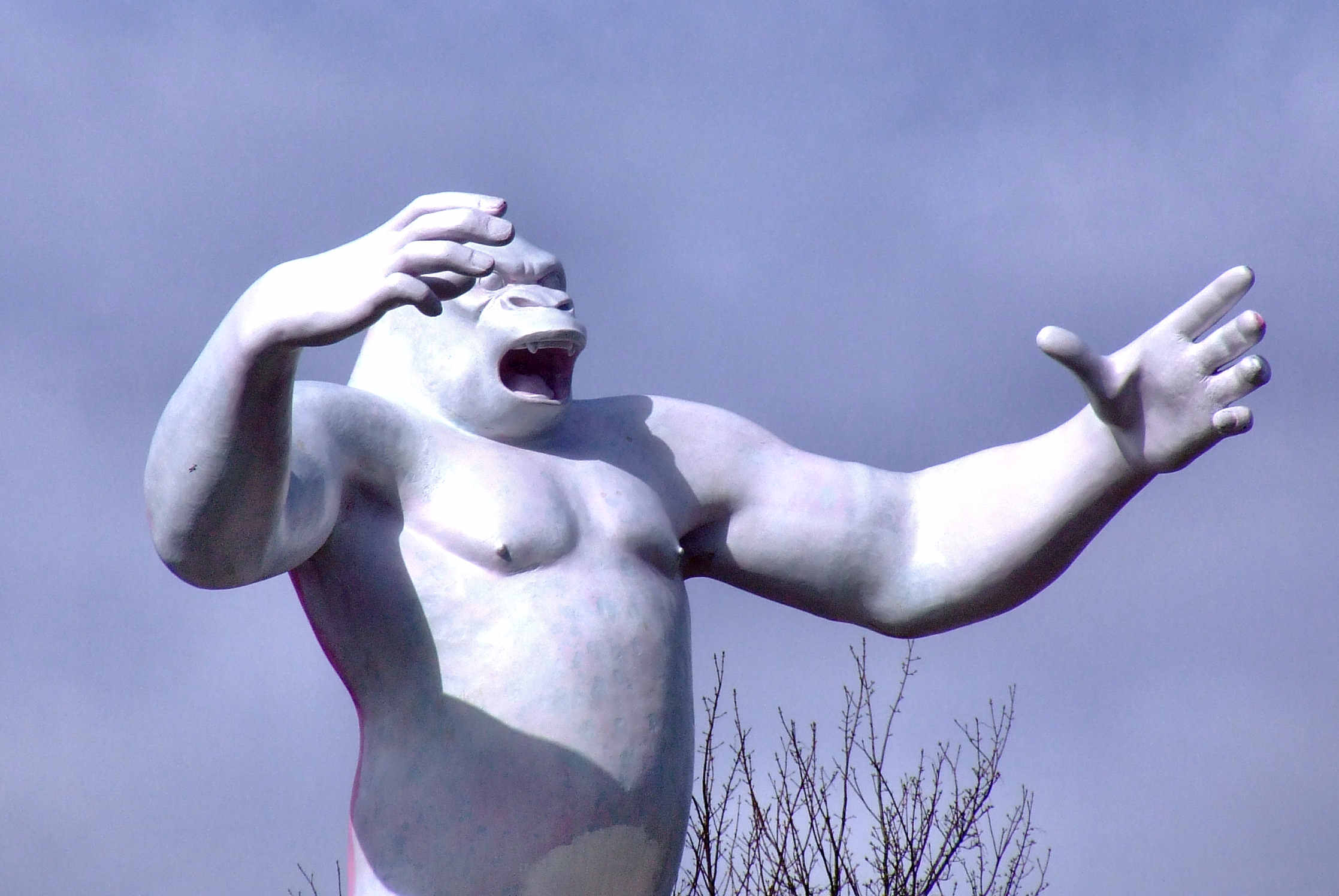
The repaired and repainted statue, at Penrith, in April 2008

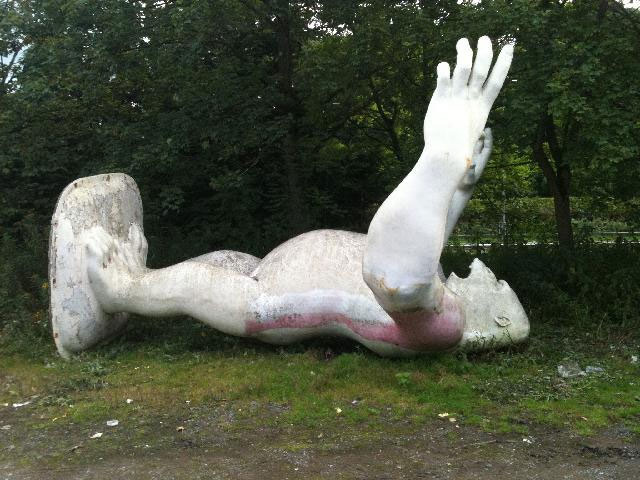
The recumbent statue at Penrith, in August 2011

It was subsequently displayed at Skirsgill Auction Mart, a market site in Penrith, and was still there in January 2011 albeit lying down, in a car park near its former position. There were calls for it to be returned to Birmingham, but the owner, Lesley Maby (wife of the late Nigel), refused to sell it.

=== Leeds ===
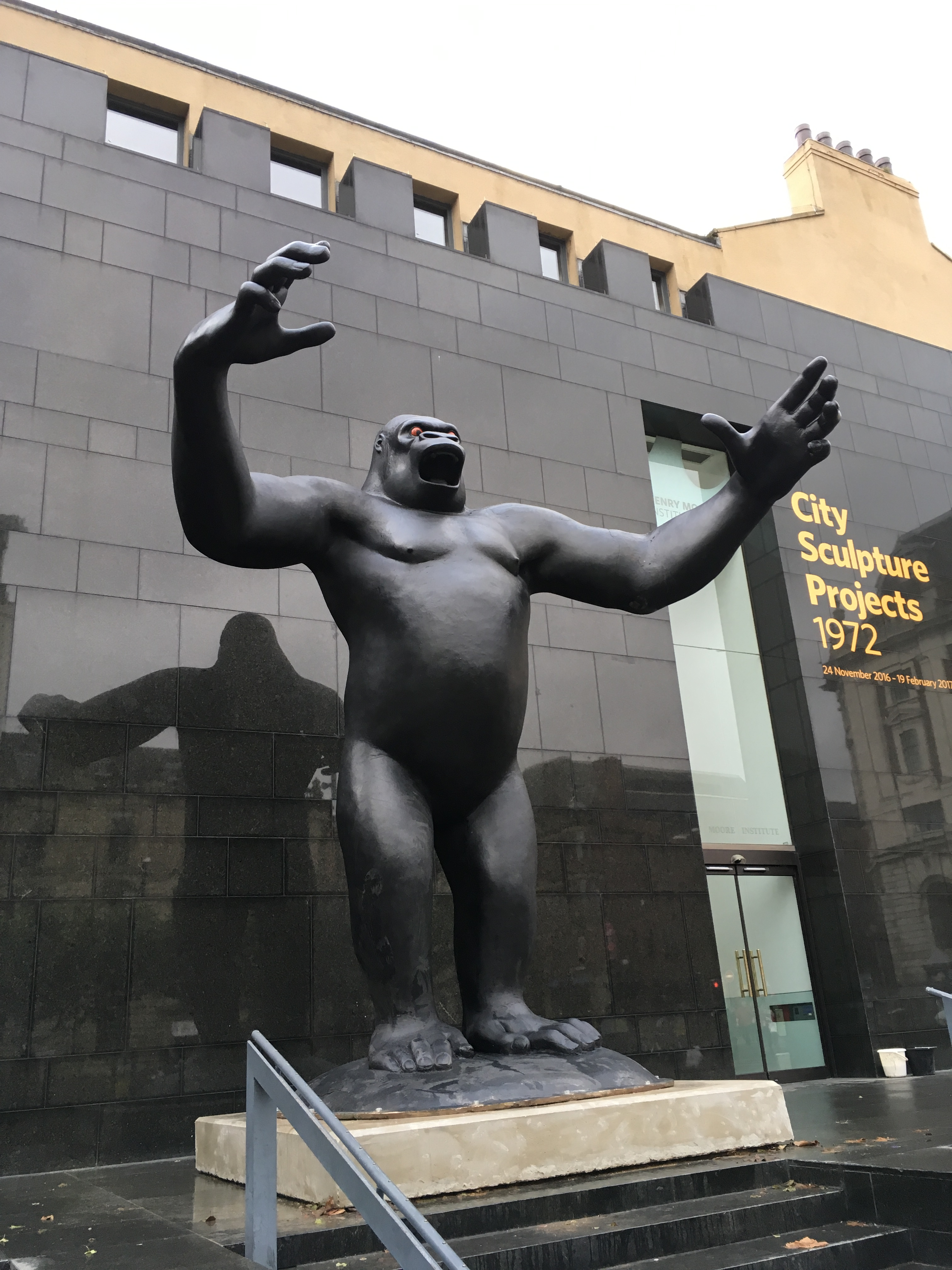
The restored statue, on the day of its installation in Leeds, 14 November 2016

In November 2016 the statue, which had been repainted in its original colours, was moved to the Henry Moore Institute in Leeds, to be exhibited at the City Sculpture Projects 1972 exhibition, commemorating the original "City Sculpture" programme, which was held from 24 November 2016 to 19 February 2017, and where Monro spoke on 23 November. The statue's maquette, on loan from Wolverhampton Art Gallery, was also part of the exhibition.

=== Cumbria ===
The statue left Leeds on 28 February 2017 and was returned to owner Lesley Maby's garden in Cumbria where it has remained ever since.

=== 2022 recreation ===
In 2022, a second, 7-metre (23 ft) tall version of the statue was created, with the blessing of members of Monro's family. It was unveiled in a pop-up park on Great Hampton Row in Birmingham's Jewellery Quarter in July, to coincide with the Commonwealth Games held in the city. Plans have been submitted for it to be relocated to the Chung Ying Plaza development on Thorp Street in Birmingham's Southside quarter, at a later date.

== In media ==
The statue featured in the television series Gangsters, which was set in Birmingham.

The comedian and entertainer Victoria Wood wrote a song about the statue, in 1973, as part of her studies at the University of Birmingham. Part of it was broadcast in a 2020 BBC programme about her career.

The music journalist Peter Paphides wrote in his 2020 autobiographical work Broken Greek that his childhood phobias included:

worms, biting into mushrooms, insects, the fibreglass King Kong which stood next to a ring road in Birmingham city centre...

Images of the statue feature extensively in the 2020 documentary film King Rocker.

== Locations ==
| Point | Coordinates (links to map & photo sources) | Notes |
|---|---|---|
| Manzoni Gardens | 52.477682°N 1.895131°W | 10 May 1972 |
| King Kong Car Co. (Camp Hill) | 52.471475°N 1.877836°W | September 1972 |
| Birmingham School of Architecture | 52.4874156°N 1.8883999°W | On Loan - June 1975 |
| King Kong Car Co. (Ladypool Road, Sparkbrook) | 52.454989°N 1.877578°W | 1976 |
| Ingliston Market | 55.942555°N 3.382936°W | 1976 |
| Skirsgill Auction Mart, Penrith | 54.653538°N 2.766318°W | standing location - April 2008 |
| Skirsgill Auction Mart, Penrith | 54.651820°N 2.766822°W | recumbent location - January 2011 |
| Henry Moore Institute, Leeds | 53.7999301°N 1.5475642°W | November 2016 |
| Cumbria | | February 2017 |
