= Ninia Benjamin =

British actress

Ninia Benjamin is a British comedian who makes frequent appearances at the Edinburgh Festival. Benjamin has also appeared on the TV shows 3 Non-Blondes and Twisted Tales.

She appeared on the Sky One show Cirque de Celebrité and was voted out in the sixth week. However, she remained as a personal trainer for Kenzie. She won the 2007 series of Celebrity Scissorhands, beating Aled Haydn Jones to the trophy. She was one of the contestants in Celebrity MasterChef 2008. She appeared on the British version of Hole in the Wall on 22 November 2008, on Anton du Beke's team, and again on 31 October 2009 on Joe Swash's team and also on the Celebrity Special version of Total Wipeout, where she was the slowest celebrity ever to cross the course with a time of 11:11.

She provides the voices for the characters Eagle and Mosquito in BBC children's programme Tinga Tinga Tales.
