= Nicholas Monro =

British artist (1936–2022)

- Born: 1936
- Died: 2022 (aged 85–86)
- Education: Chelsea School of Art
- Occupations: Sculptor; Print-maker; Art teacher
- Employer: Chelsea School of Art
- Style: Pop art

Nicholas Monro (1936 – 2022) was an English pop art sculptor, print-maker and art teacher. He is known for being one of the few British pop artists to work in sculpture and is known for his use of fibreglass.

== Life and work ==
Monro studied art at the Chelsea School of Art from 1958 to 1961. After graduating he began teaching at Swindon School of Art, then returned to Chelsea School of Art in 1968.

In 1969 he received an Arts Council Award and was included in the exhibition Pop Art Re-Assessed at the Hayward Gallery.

In the early 1970s, he had a studio at Hungerford.

His work was included in the 2004 pop art retrospective "Art and the 60s: This Was Tomorrow" at Tate Britain, and Birmingham Gas Hall and, in the same year, "British Pop Art 1956–1972" at the Galleria Civica di Modena.

== Public collections ==
Monro's works are in the collections of the Berardo Collection Museum, Tate Modern and Wolverhampton Art Gallery.

== Key works ==
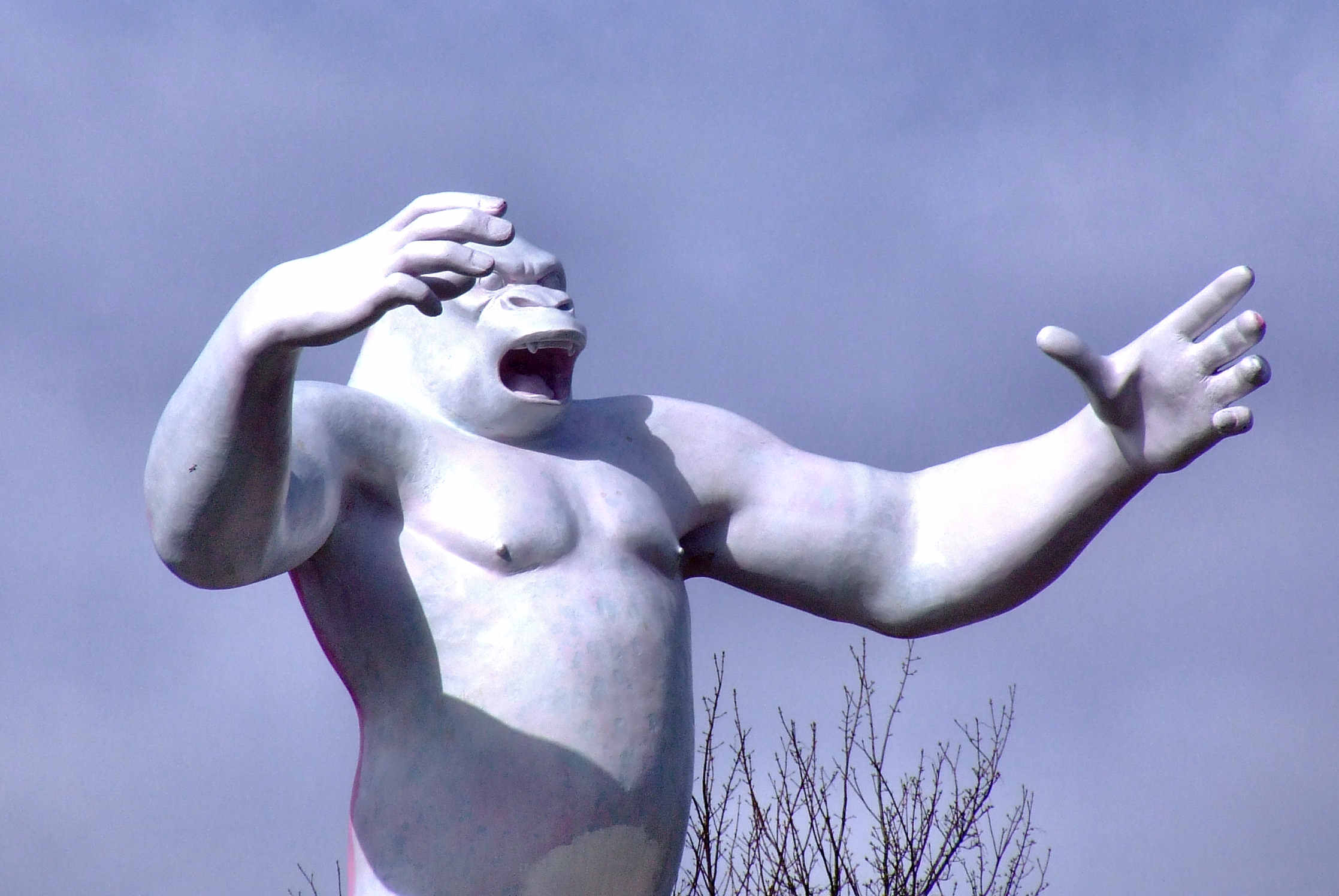
The repaired and repainted Statue of King Kong, at Penrith, in April 2008

- Money Bags, painted fibreglass (1965)
- Flock of Sheep, painted fibreglass, (1968) – now in a private collection in Wuppertal, Germany
- Statue of King Kong, painted fibreglass, (1972)
- The Sand Dancers (a statue of Wilson, Keppel and Betty), made for the Sands Hotel, Edinburgh, now part of the Treadwell Collection.
- Bust of Max Wall, painted fibreglass, sold for £6,875 ($11,323) at Christie's, London, on 23 August 2011
- Statue of Eric Morecambe & Ernie Wise, in painted fibreglass, commissioned in 1977 by the Arts Council, this statue was to form part of the British Genius exhibition at Battersea Park, London
