= Jocelyn Jee Esien =

British actress (born 1974)

- Born: 7 May 1974 (age 52); Hackney, London, England
- Television: 3 Non-Blondes; Little Miss Jocelyn

Jocelyn Jee Esien (born 7 May 1974) is a British comedian, actress and writer of Nigerian origin. She stars in the hidden-camera show 3 Non-Blondes, her own comedy sketch show series, Little Miss Jocelyn, and the comedy-drama series Beauty of Britain.

== Life and career ==
Esien was born on 7 May 1974 in Hackney, London, to Nigerian parents. She attended Raine's Foundation School, and initially studied law before giving up to study drama, graduating from Guildhall School of Music and Drama.

In 2000, Esien won the Best Newcomer award at the Black International Comedy Awards, and went on to win a New Talent Award in the Women in Film and Television Awards 2006.

In 2003, Esien came to prominence as one of the 3 Non-Blondes in the BBC hidden-camera comedy show, having also appeared in other television series such as sketch comedy The Fast Show and the police procedural series, The Bill.

In 2006, she wrote and starred in her own comedy sketch show called Little Miss Jocelyn, a second series of which aired in January 2008. This show marks the first time in the history of television – in either the US or the UK – that a black woman has been given her own solo comedy sketch show. In 2007, Esien featured in Girls Aloud and Sugababes' Comic Relief video for "Walk This Way", where she puts a parking ticket on Ewen Macintosh, a reference to the character Jiffy from the show Little Miss Jocelyn. On 11 June 2009, it was stated that Little Miss Jocelyn would not be brought back for a third series.

From 2009 to 2012, Esien starred in all three series of Beauty of Britain, a comedy-drama on BBC Radio 4 written by Christopher Douglas and Nicola Sanderson, portraying a Nigerian-born agency careworker, Beauty Olonga, newly arrived in the UK and coming to grips with the country while working in the decrepit British care system.

In November 2009, Esien played the part of waitress Cindie Smith in the ITV series Collision. She appeared in the second series of The Sarah Jane Adventures as Clyde Langer's mother, Carla. In 2010, Esien reprised the role in two further episodes of the show, titled The Empty Planet and aired on 1 and 2 November 2010, as well as in the fifth series story, The Curse of Clyde Langer, which aired on 10 and 11 October 2011.

Esien appeared in the 2010 film StreetDance 3D and wrote an episode of the American reality TV show Jon & Kate Plus 8.

On 22 September 2010, Esien returned to BBC Three for One Non-Blonde: Down Under, an eight-part comedy stunt show with new character creations. She plays characters such as a hermaphrodite rapper and a socialite, touring New Zealand. She also appeared alongside famous British comedians in BBC One's Ronnie Corbett Christmas special, The One Ronnie.

In 2011, Esien appeared as Tasha in British comedy Anuvahood. and also in the BBC Three coming-of-age comedy series Some Girls.

She has also made numerous stage appearances. In January and February 2013, she appeared in One Monkey Don't Stop No Show by the American playwright Don Evans, at the Tricycle Theatre, a London premiere for the play, and thereafter toured with the play nationally.

In 2013, Esien appeared in Gangsta Granny as Kelly. She also appeared in the BBC comedy Big School as Daphne, the personal assistant and secretary to headmistress Ms Baron (Frances de la Tour) from 2013 to 2014.

Esien's other television appearances include:

- Autumn Leaves, a BBC comedy-drama
- Some Girls
- Uncle Max
- After You've Gone
- Holby City
- The Lenny Henry Show
- Ed Stone is Dead
- Comedy Nation
- Douglas
- In The Name of Love (television film).

Esien appeared in a cameo role as a PCSO in the long running BBC sitcom "Not Going Out" on 15 April 2022.

== Filmography ==
=== Film ===
Title	Role	Year
Absolutely Fabulous: The Movie	Nigerian TV Presenter	2016
Anuvahood	Tasha	2011
StreetDance 3D	Delilah (Shawna's boss)	2010
The Hustle	Other Chloe (a pub girl)	(2019)

=== TV ===
Title	Role	Year	Notes
Mr Big Stuff	Jazmine	2024	
Not Going Out	Police Woman	2022	
Death in Paradise	Zelda Moncrief	2021	Christmas special episode
Turn Up Charlie	Aunty Lydia	2019	
The Midnight Gang	Tootsie	2018	BBC adaptation of David Walliams's book of the same name.
Upstart Crow	Lucy	2017-2018	series regular
Big School	Daphne	2013-2014	series regular
Gangsta Granny	Kelly	2013	television film
The Revolting World of Stanley Brown	Olivia	2012	series regular
Some Girls	Martine	2012, 2014	series 1, episode 5; series 3, episode 1
The Sarah Jane Adventures	Carla Langer	2008-2011	5 episodes
The One Ronnie	Restaurant Diner	2010	television film
1 Non Blonde	Didio/Titchy/Pammy	2010	Writer/director/producer
Collision	Cindie Smith	2009	television mini-series
Uncle Max	Diva	2008	episode: "Uncle Max Goes to the Opera"
Jon & Kate Plus 8	Herself	2008	Writer, episode: "Potty Training the Boys"
Little Miss Jocelyn	Various	2006-2008	Writer
After You've Gone	Lucy	2007	episode: "Stuck in the Middle with You"
Strictly Confidential	Chantelle Rimmington	2006	series 1, episode 2
Holby City	Trace Smith	2005	episode: "No Pain No Gain"
The Lenny Henry Show	Herself	2004	Writer
3 Non-Blondes	Various	2003	Series 1 (only series)
In the Name of Love	Rachel	1999	television film
Babymother	Yvette	1998	
The Bill	Millie Densmore	1998	episode: "One of the Gang"
The Fast Show	Jocelyn Esien	1997	series 3, episode 6
