= Mark Thomas =

English comedian (born 1963)

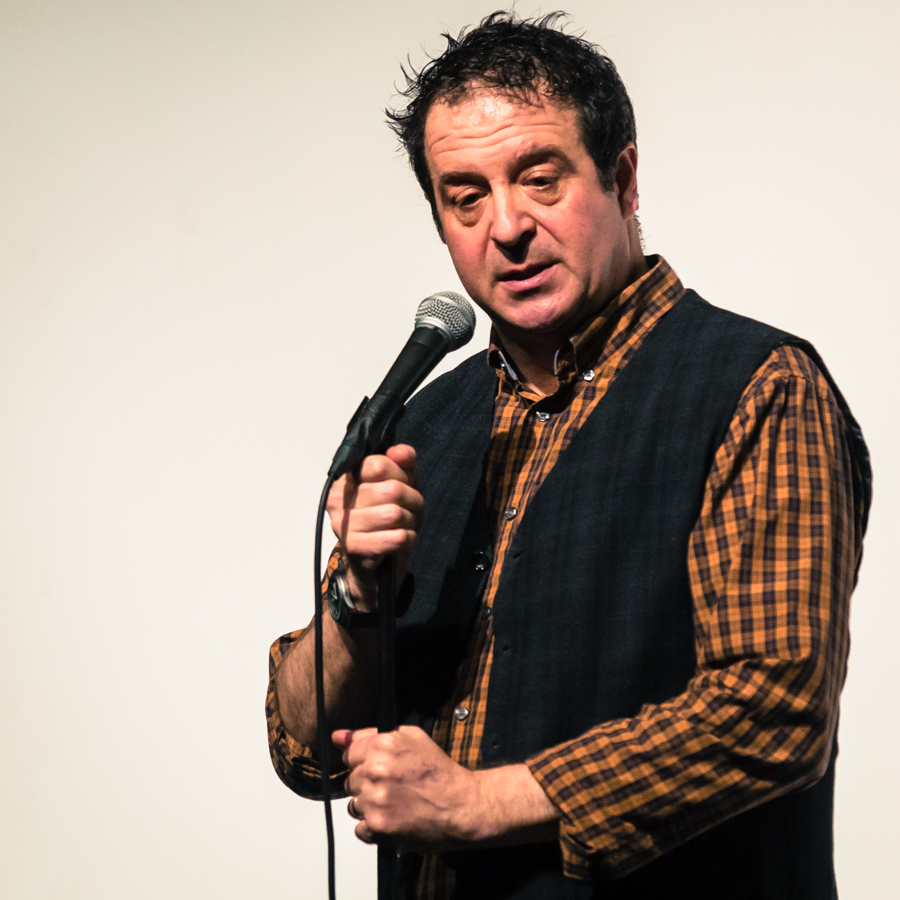
- Thomas performing in 2016
- Born: 11 April 1963 (age 63); London, England
- Education: Christ's Hospital
- Occupations: Comedian; Activist; Presenter; Journalist; Columnist
- Known for: Political activism
- Spouse(s): Jenny Landreth, m. 1991, div. 2020
- Children: 2
- Father: Colin Alec Todd Thomas
- Website: MarkThomasInfo.co.uk

Mark Clifford Thomas (born 11 April 1963) is an English comedian, best known for the political stunts that he performs on his show, The Mark Thomas Comedy Product on Channel 4. Thomas first became known as a guest comic on the BBC Radio 1 comedy show The Mary Whitehouse Experience first broadcast in March 1989. He describes himself as a "libertarian anarchist".

== Biography ==
=== Early life and education ===
Mark Thomas was born in South London. His mother was a midwife and his father a self-employed builder (and ex-lay preacher). Thomas was educated at Macaulay Church of England Primary School, Victoria Rise, Clapham until 1974, where his party trick was to recite the first verses of the four gospels from memory. He then won a scholarship to attend the independent Christ's Hospital School, where he attained O-levels and A-levels in English, history, and politics and economics. At school, Thomas was influenced by his drama teacher, Duncan Noel-Paton, and by Bertolt Brecht's play The Caucasian Chalk Circle, in which the audience's sympathies are swayed from one view of a political argument to the other; speaking of this to The Guardian in 1999, he said "I was amazed that a play could make you change your mind". In a 2016 interview, he stated that he became an atheist at the age of 12, and subsequently developed an interest in radical politics during his teenage years, including Anarchism, Marxism and Trotskyism. He went on to be awarded a degree in Theatre Arts at Bretton Hall College. During his time at Bretton Hall, he made his debut as a performer, co-writing and performing satirical sketches at Wakefield Labour Club.

=== Career ===
After graduating, Thomas subsequently embarked on his comedy career, initially supporting himself through working on building sites with his father. Thomas' early exposure to comedy was through watching and listening to Dave Allen, Steptoe and Son, The Goon Show and Tony Hancock; his biggest influence was hearing a recording of Alexei Sayle: "It was like someone had kicked the door in – just listening to that tape and thinking that someone could do this stuff". He also cited the playwright Trevor Griffiths as an early influence, describing him as "an absolute genius". He went on to write material for Dave Allen.

Prior to his most renowned vehicle, The Mark Thomas Comedy Product, Thomas was a frequent guest comic on the BBC Radio 1 show The Mary Whitehouse Experience, where he would do a routine about a specific topic of the week and involve studio audience members in the discussions. He would also occasionally play parts in sketches written by the show's main performers. He then became the resident stand-up comic on Saturday Zoo, a Channel 4 comedy series first screened in 1993 and appeared on an episode of Have I Got News for You. He co-presented the highly successful Radio 1 comedy talk show Loose Talk with Kevin Day, and is a founder member of the London Comedy Store's hard hitting Cutting Edge show.

His political comedy show, The Mark Thomas Comedy Product (later renamed as simply The Mark Thomas Product, to reflect its increasing political agenda) on Channel 4 earned him criticism from politicians but was seen by critics as a crucial investigative tool. In one edition, Thomas investigated the practice of avoiding inheritance tax by declaring art, furniture, homes and land available for public viewing. After discovering that Conservative Member of Parliament (MP) Nicholas Soames was claiming tax relief on a "three-tier mahogany buffet with partially reeded slender balustrade upright supports" on this basis, but without making any arrangements for the furniture to be inspected by the public, Thomas invented a 'National Soames Day' on which hundreds of people made appointments to see the furniture. Soames subsequently decided to pay the tax on the item and Gordon Brown, then Chancellor of the Exchequer, changed the law. In 2015, Thomas told The Independent's Adam Jacques: "I try to find the good in my enemies. It's not unusual to be able to get on with people despite what they are doing being awful. The only person I have met who I considered to be without any redeeming features was [...] Nicholas Soames. [...] He was such a pantomime baddie."

Leaving Channel 4 was a mutual decision, following a series of disputes over how far the channel would go in its broadcasting, one of which concerned the channel's reluctance to support actions concerning corporate accountability and corporate manslaughter laws—a cause he had campaigned for—which coincided with the Queen Mother's funeral. He declined to take part in a proposed Celebrity Guantanamo Bay 'reality TV' show.

Thomas has appeared at numerous comedy benefit nights, and is a well established stand-up comedian in the UK. He is the chairman of the Ilısu Dam Campaign, a campaign which was successful in temporarily blocking the development of a large-scale hydroelectric dam in southeast Turkey that campaigners claim will lead to the displacement of up to 78,000 people, mostly Kurds, without adequate compensation or consultation, as well as to environmental and cultural destruction.

Recently, Thomas has been working with War on Want in India and investigating and filming human rights violations in Colombia (by, amongst others, Coca-Cola) where trade unions are targeted by militia allegedly controlled by the government. He wrote a regular column for the New Statesman between 2001 and 2007.

The parliamentary committee which oversees weapons exports, the House of Commons Quadripartite Select committee, commended him for his undercover work, which led to official warning letters being issued to a number of companies. His work in this area is covered in As Used on the Famous Nelson Mandela: Underground Adventures in the Arms and Torture Trade, a book chronicling his experiences undercover, his political activism and his projects designed to find and report loopholes in arms trading laws, which culminated in a controversial un-broadcast Newsnight report about the Hinduja brothers.

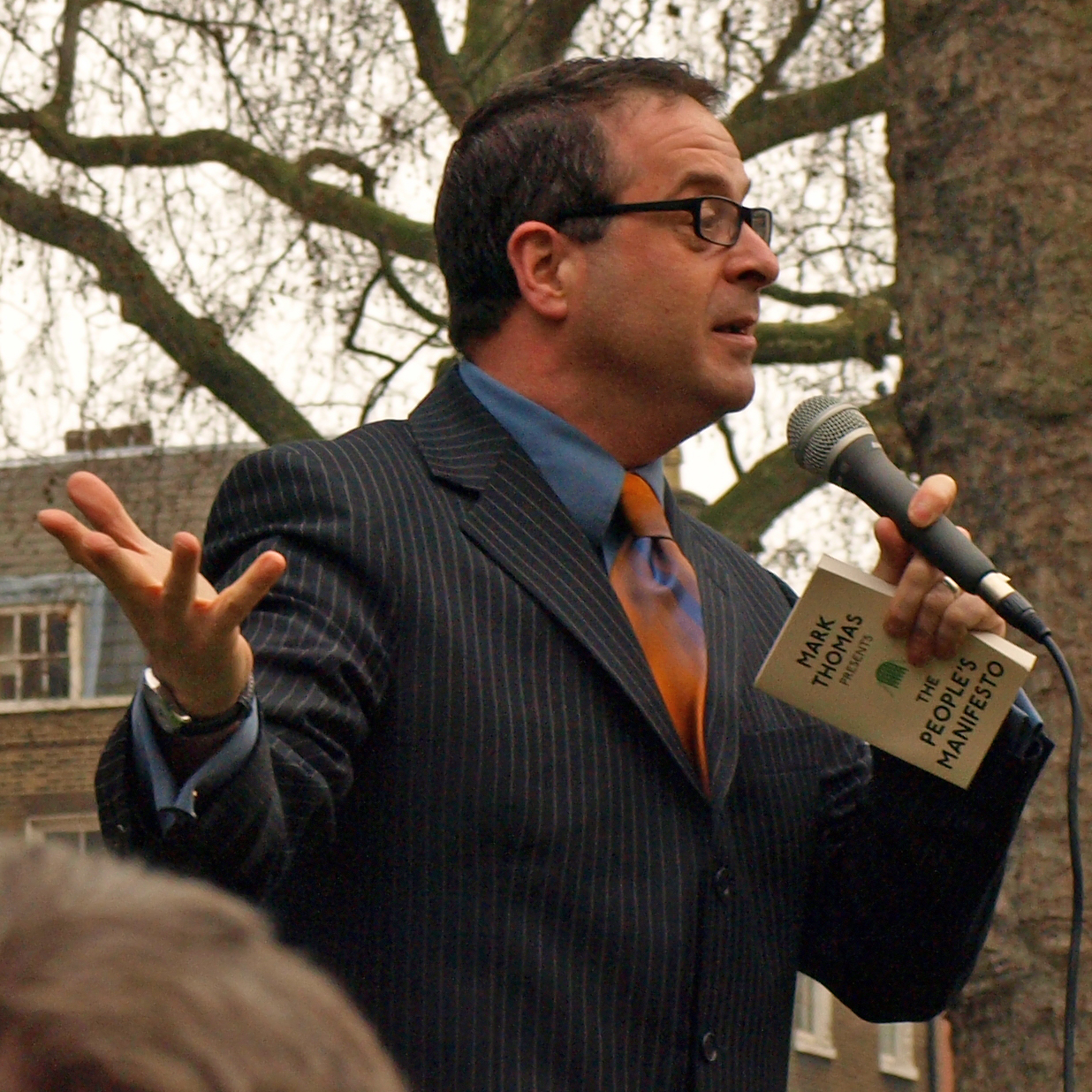
Thomas at the UK Uncut stand-up show in March 2011

Whilst promoting this book on his latest tour, Thomas organised mass lone demonstrations, in protest of the Serious Organised Crime and Police Act 2005, an act of Parliament that prevents any demonstrations within London's Parliament Square zone without prior police approval. The last event attracted over 100 individual protesters at the same time. In 2006, he was added to the Guinness Book of Records for most demonstrations held on one day: 20 individual protests in 20 different locations. Although he actually performed 21 protests the first and last took place at the same location, so it was agreed that only 20 would count towards the record. His record was later beaten in 2010 by the Freman College Amnesty group, who held 23 demonstrations.

In 2008, he was awarded an honorary doctorate by the University of Bradford, for services to peace and for his work as a comedian, political activist, presenter and investigative journalist, especially for his effective campaigning on the ethics of the arms trade. The university has a long-standing Department of Peace Studies.

In 2009, Thomas launched the Huddersfield Policy postcard campaign, petitioning the Queen with protests against the prospect of a state funeral for Margaret Thatcher.

For his 'It's The Stupid Economy' UK tour in 2009, Thomas played 55 shows over 14 weeks between March and end July, and encouraged each audience to come up with their own policies (silly or serious) that would somehow make their lives better, forming a "People's Manifesto". Each audience then got to vote on their favourite policy of that evening and the winning suggestion then formed part of his manifesto which he will then campaign for and attempt to actually make at least some of the suggestions become reality.

In April 2010, Thomas was awarded £1200 compensation for a search carried out by police in 2007. He had been unlawfully subject to a stop-and-search without adequate cause, after speaking at an anti-arms rally.

During 2010 Thomas decided to go rambling in the Middle East and walked the entire length of the Israeli Separation Barrier, crossing between the Israeli and the Palestinian side. His touring show entitled "Walking The Wall" (2011) was shortlisted for the Amnesty International Freedom of Expression award and his book Extreme Rambling recounted the story.

Thomas revealed in 2013 that he had discovered, through a Data Protection request, that he had been under police surveillance as a result of his investigative journalism for Channel 4 and the New Statesman and put on the domestic extremist database. He cautioned other journalists, "I apologise for the boastful tone but the police have monitored public interest investigations in my case since 1999. More importantly if the police are keeping tabs on a lightweight like myself then they are doing the same and more to others. This is more than supposition as I know of other NUJ members on the database." The following year, Thomas and five journalists and photographers who had also been under surveillance by the London Metropolitan Police Service's National Domestic Extremism and Disorder Intelligence Unit (NDEDIU) began legal action against the force. The NDEDIU's reports obtained by Thomas described him as a "general rabble rouser and alleged comedian" and stated, "Mark Thomas stops. Has quantity of cress on rear of his cycle." He told The Independent's Adam Lusher, "The police's powers of observation are to be admired, I did indeed have cress on my bike. [But] Is it really suitable to spend taxpayers' money observing the movement of cress?"

In January 2020, Thomas returned to the stage with his new show 'Mark Thomas: 50 Things About Us' where he states little-known facts about the UK with his trademark mix of stand-up, storytelling and research.

In October 2025, Thomas joined the cast of the upcoming film The Man with the Plan, about the William Beveridge report, starring as the Narrator.

== Archives ==
Thomas has donated several sets of his notes, research material, publicity material, press clippings, other ephemera and audio recordings to the University of Kent's "British Stand-Up Comedy Archive".

== Television ==
- Friday Night Live, Channel 4 (1988)
- Saturday Zoo, Channel 4 (1993)
- Viva Cabaret, Channel 4 (1993)
- Denton, Channel 7 Australia (1994)
- The Mark Thomas Comedy Product (later renamed The Mark Thomas Product), Channel 4 which ran for six series totalling 45 episodes (1996–2002)
- Dispatches: The Lie of the Land, Channel 4 (1998)
- Thomas Country, Channel 4 (1999)
- The Immigration and Asylum Bill, Channel 5 (2000)
- Secret Map of Britain, Channel 4 (2002)
- Dispatches: Mark Thomas – Broom Cupboard Inspector, Channel 4 (2003)
- Dispatches: Mark Thomas — Debt Collector, Channel 4 (2003)
- Dispatches: After School Arms Club, Channel 4 (2006)
- Dispatches: Mark Thomas on Coca Cola, Channel 4 (2007)

== Radio ==
- The Mary Whitehouse Experience, Radio 1 (1989)
- The Mix, Radio 5 (1990)
- Sleeping with the NME, Radio 5 (1991)
- Loose Talk, Radio 1 (1991–1992)
- Booked!, Radio 4 (1995–1998)
- Celluloid Psychiatrists, Radio 4 (2000)
- Left Bank of the Mind, Radio 4 (2001)
- Mark Thomas Presents..., Radio 4 (2005) (shows on Stan Freberg, the Firesign Theatre, Shelley Berman and Mort Sahl)
- Chain Reaction, Radio 4 (2006)
- My Life in Serious Organised Crime, Radio 4 (2007)
- Ramblings, Radio 4 (2008) (walking The Ridgeway track in Wiltshire and Oxfordshire)
- Mark Thomas: The Manifesto Radio 4 (2009–2013)
- Bravo Figaro, Radio 4 (2013)

== Discography ==
- Sex, Filth and Religion (video) (1995)
- Live (1998)
- Dambusters (2001)
- The Night War Broke Out (2004)
- Mark Thomas Comedy Show (2005)
- Mark Thomas:Serious Organised Criminal (DVD) (2007)
- Bravo Figaro (2013)

== Live tours ==
- As Used on the Famous Nelson Mandela... (2006)
- Serious Organised Criminal (2007)
- Belching Out The Devil (2008)
- It's the Stupid Economy (2009)
- Extreme Rambling – Walking the Wall (2011)
- Bravo Figaro (2012)
- 100 Acts of Minor Dissent (2013)
- Cuckooed (2014)
- Trespass (2015)
- The Red Shed (2017)
- Showtime from the Frontline (2018)
- Check Up (2019)
- Black and White (2022)
- Gaffa Tapes (2025)

=== Other live shows ===
- Mark Thomas: Metrix Consortium at The Open University (9 September 2008)
- Hastings Comedy Festival: Mark Thomas at the Observer Building (11 June 2024)

== Books ==
- As Used on the Famous Nelson Mandela: Underground Adventures in the Arms and Torture Trade (2007)
- Belching Out the Devil: Global Adventures with Coca-Cola (2009)
- Mark Thomas Presents the People's Manifesto (2010)
- Extreme Rambling: Walking Israel's Separation Barrier. For Fun. (2011)
- 100 Acts of Minor Dissent (2015)
- The Liar's Quartet: Bravo Figaro!, Cuckooed, The Red Shed – Playscripts, Notes and Commentary (2017)
- 50 Things About Us: What We Really Need to Know About Britain (2020)

== Film ==
- The Man with the Plan, Sands Films (2026)

== Awards ==
- Time Out Comedy Award (1990)
- Perrier Comedy Award nominee (1992)

In addition to being recognised for his comedy career, Mark Thomas has been awarded various citations for his political campaigning, including:

- Kurdish National Congress Medal of Honour (2002)
- International Service Award for the Global Defence of Human Rights (2004)
- MediActivist Awards (2005)
- Former Guinness World Record Holder for Most Number of Political Demonstrations in 24 Hours

He was also made an honorary Doctor of Letters by the University of Bradford on 3 December 2008, in recognition of his peace campaigning and services to comedy.

== Politics ==
As a part of his television series, Thomas stood as an Independent candidate for the safe Labour parliamentary seat of Hemsworth in a 1996 by-election. He came eighth of ten candidates with 122 votes (0.6%) as the election was won by Labour's Jon Trickett.

In his 4 March 2002 New Statesman column, Thomas placed a bounty on the head of US President George Bush to the value of £4,320 (his total earnings writing for the magazine to that point).

In February 2009, Thomas, alongside British entertainers David Baddiel, Bill Bailey, Morwenna Banks, Sanjeev Bhaskar, Jo Brand, Russell Brand, Rob Brydon, Jimmy Carr, Jack Dee, Omid Djalili, Sean Lock, Lee Mack, Alexei Sayle, Meera Syal, said in an open letter printed in The Times newspaper of the Baháʼí leaders to be on trial in Iran: "In reality, their only "crime", which the current regime finds intolerable, is that they hold a religious belief that is different from the majority.... we register our solidarity with all those in Iran who are being persecuted for promoting the best development of society ...(and) with the governments, human rights organisations and people of goodwill throughout the world who have so far raised their voices calling for a fair trial, if not the complete release of the Baháʼí leaders in Iran." Echoing the comments earlier in the month made by two hundred and sixty seven non-Baháʼí Iranian academics, writers, artists, journalists and activists from 21 countries including Iran who signed an open letter of apology posted to Iranian.com and stating they were "ashamed" and pledging their support in Baháʼís achieving the rights detailed in the Universal Declaration of Human Rights for the Baháʼís in Iran. See Persecution of Baháʼís.

Prior to the 2015 UK general election, he was one of several celebrities who endorsed the parliamentary candidacy of the Green Party's Caroline Lucas.

In December 2019, along with 42 other leading cultural figures, Thomas signed a letter endorsing the Labour Party under Jeremy Corbyn's leadership in the 2019 general election. The letter stated that "Labour's election manifesto under Jeremy Corbyn's leadership offers a transformative plan that prioritises the needs of people and the planet over private profit and the vested interests of a few."

== Collections ==
The University of Kent holds material by Thomas as part of the British Stand-Up Comedy Archive. The collection relates to Thomas' work as both comedian and activist, and includes audio-visual recordings, props and documents from performances, research material and drafts of publications.

== See also ==
- Ilısu Dam Campaign
- Robert Newman
- Southeastern Anatolia Project
- Corporate crime
- Serious Organised Crime and Police Act 2005 (see "Protests near Parliament" section)
- The People's Manifesto
