= List of Britain's Got Talent finalists =

Britain's Got Talent is a British talent reality television series that first aired in 2007. As of 11 June 2025, there have been eighteen completed series. The show has been spun off around the world under the Got Talent franchise. The competition is open to people of all ages who possess a talent. After the initial rounds of auditions, successful contestants are narrowed down by the judges.

In the first series, 24 contestants made it into the three semi-finals, and in subsequent series this has been increased to 40 (45 in series 6–10) contestants across five live shows. The act which receives the most public votes in each semi-final goes through to the final, with the second finalist being decided by the judges from the second and third most popular contestants. In series 6, a "wildcard" element was introduced. This is where judges pick an eliminated act from the semi-finals, and that act is sent through to the final. In Series 6, boyband The Mend were chosen. In Series 7, ventriloquist Steve Hewlett was chosen. In Series 8, impressionist Jon Clegg was chosen. In Series 9, a second wildcard was introduced, voted for by the public from the five acts who lost the judges' vote in the semi-finals. Dance group Boyband were chosen by the judges, while martial artist Jesse-Jane McParland was chosen by public vote. In Series 10, dance duo Shannon & Peter were chosen by the judges, while dog act Lucy & Trip Hazard were chosen by public vote. In Series 11, the format returned to series 8. Singer Sarah Ikumu was chosen. In Series 12, choir B Positive Choir were chosen. In Series 13, dance duo Libby and Charlie were chosen. In Series 14, there were no wildcards, so there were only 10 acts in the final. In Series 15, dog act Amber and the Dancing Collies were chosen. In Series 16, variety act Tonikaku was chosen. In Series 17, dog act The Trickstars were chosen. In Series 18, singing duo Han & Fran were chosen. In Series 19, for the first time since Series 5 (disregarding Series 14), there was no wildcard.

In Series 18, a Live Show Golden Buzzer was introduced in the semi-finals, giving each judge and Ant & Dec (who gave theirs to KSI) a chance to press the buzzer for any act in the semi-final they were chosen for and send that act straight through to the final. Amanda Holden pressed hers for LED dance group The Blackouts. Simon Cowell pressed his for guitarist Olly Pearson. Bruno Tonioli pressed his for opera singer Jasmine Rice. Alesha Dixon pressed hers for stand-up comedian Joseph Charm. KSI pressed his (in Ant & Dec's right) for magician and eventual winner Harry Moulding. In Series 19, Amanda pressed hers for singer Matty Juniosa. Alesha pressed hers for dance group Sadeck Berrabah & LMA. KSI pressed his for foot juggler Liwei Yang. Simon pressed his for spoken-word poet Sonny Green. The group Golden Buzzer was pressed for drone display group Celestial.

In the final, each of the finalists perform again, but this time the result is determined purely from the public vote, with the winner receiving £250,000 (£100,000 in series 1–5, £500,000 in series 6) and the chance to perform their act at the Royal Variety Performance.

Opera singer Paul Potts won the first series of the competition in 2007. Street dancer George Sampson won the second series in 2008. Dance troupe Diversity won the third series in 2009. Gymnastics troupe Spelbound won the fourth series in 2010. Singer Jai McDowall won the fifth series in 2011. Dog act Ashleigh and Pudsey won the sixth series in 2012. Shadow theatre group Attraction won the seventh series in 2013. Classical singers Collabro won the eighth series in 2014. Dog act Jules O'Dwyer & Matisse won the ninth series in 2015. Magician Richard Jones won the tenth series in 2016. Pianist Tokio Myers won the eleventh series in 2017. Comedian Lost Voice Guy won the twelfth series in 2018. Singer Colin Thackery won the thirteenth series in 2019. Comedic singer and pianist Jon Courtenay won the fourteenth series in 2020. Comedian Axel Blake won the fifteenth series in 2022. Comedian Viggo Venn won the sixteenth series in 2023. Singer Sydnie Christmas won the seventeenth series in 2024. Magician Harry Moulding won the eighteenth series in 2025. Choir The Hawkstone Farmer's Choir won the nineteenth series in 2026.

== Contestants ==
For more details on each of the contestants, see the relevant series article.

Key:

Winner
Runner-Up
Third Place
Finalist
Wildcard
Public Wildcard
Golden Buzzer
Live Show Golden Buzzer

Name	Series	Genre	Act	Finished	Ref
100 Voices of Gospel	10	Singing	Choir (gospel)	8th	
2 Grand	3	Singing	Singing duo	10th	
4MG	13	Magic	Magic group	11th	
5 Star Boys	15	Dance	Dance group	11th	
Aaron and Jasmine	14	Dance	Dance duo (Latin)	10th	
Abigail & Afronitaaa	17	Dance	Dance duo	3rd	
The Addict Initiative	8	Dance	Dance group	10th	
Aidan Davis	3	Dance	Street dancer	5th	
Aidan McCann	14	Magic	Magician	7th	
Alex Magala	10	Danger	Sword swallower	9th	
Alex Mitchell	17	Comedy	Stand up comedian	8th	
Amber and the Dancing Collies	15	Animals	Dog act	10th	
Amy Lou	16	Singing	Singer	7th	
Anastasiia & Salsa	19	Animals	Dog act	3rd	
Andrew Johnston	2	Singing	Boy soprano	3rd	
Andrew Muir	2	Singing	Singer	Finalist	
Aneeshwar Kunchala	15	Variety	Poet	7th	
Aquabatique	6	Variety	Synchronised swimmers	10th	
Arisxandra	7	Singing	Singer	8th	
Asanda	7	Singing	Singer	11th	
Ashleigh and Pudsey	6	Animals	Dog act	1st	
Attraction	7	Dance	Shadow theatre group	1st	
Axel Blake	15	Comedy	Stand up comedian	1st	
B Positive Choir	12	Singing	Choir	11th	
Balance Unity	10	Dance	Dancer	10th	
The Bar Wizards	1	Variety	Flair bartending duo	Finalist	
Bars & Melody	8	Singing	Rapping & singing duo	3rd	
Beau Dermott	10	Singing	Singer	5th	
Ben Hart	13	Magic	Magician	3rd	
Ben Nickless	15	Comedy	Impressionist	8th	
Bessie Cursons	1	Singing	Musical theatre performer	Finalist	
Binita Chetry	18	Dance	Dancer	3rd	
The Blackouts	18	Dance	Dance group (LED)	2nd	
Boogie Storm	10	Dance	Dance group	3rd	
Boyband	9	Dance	Dance group	12th	
Calum Courtney	12	Singing	Singer	9th	
Calum Scott	9	Singing	Singer	6th	
Celestial	19	Variety	Drone display group	2nd	
Cheeky Monkeys	2	Dance	Dance duo	Finalist	
Christopher Stone	4	Singing	Singer	7th	
Cillian O'Connor	16	Magic	Magician	3rd	
Colin Thackery	13	Singing	Singer	1st	
Collabro	8	Singing	Singing group (classical)	1st	
Connected (Note: Connected split up shortly after the competition. Brothers Harry and Max Mondryk, along with friend Matt Fitzgerald, reformed as ReConnected. The remaining members, Myles and Connor Ryan, came together under the name Myles and Connor.)	4	Singing	Boy band	8th	
Connie Talbot	1	Singing	Singer	Finalist	
Côr Glanaethwy	9	Singing	Choir	3rd	
Craig Ball	10	Singing / comedy	Impressionist singer	6th	
The D-Day Darlings	12	Singing	Vocal harmony group	7th	
Daliso Chaponda	11	Comedy	Stand up comedian	3rd	
Damien O'Brien	14	Magic	Magician	6th	
Damon Scott	1	Comedy	Puppeteer	Finalist	
Danny Posthill	9	Comedy	Impressionist	7th	
Darcy Oake	8	Magic	Illusionist	5th	
Dave & Finn	13	Magic / animals	Dog magic act	5th	
Diversity	3	Dance	Street dance group	1st	
DNA	11	Magic	Mentalist duo	11th	
Donchez Dacres	12	Singing	Singer (reggae)	3rd	
Duo Odyssey	16	Acrobatics	Aerial duo	10th	
DVJ	12	Dance	Street dance group	6th	
Entity Allstars	9	Dance	Dance group	11th	
Escala	2	Music	String quartet	Finalist	
Eva Abley	15	Comedy	Stand up comedian	5th	
Fabian Fox	19	Magic	Magician	9th	
Faryl Smith	2	Singing	Singer	Finalist	
Flakefleet Primary School	13	Singing	Choir	6th	
Flawless	3	Dance	Street dance group	8th	
Flintz & T4ylor	15	Singing / music	Rapping & pianist duo	6th	
Francine Lewis	7	Comedy	Impressionist	10th	
Gabz	7	Singing / music	Singer & pianist	7th	
George Sampson	2	Dance	Street dancer	1st	
Ghetto Kids	16	Dance	Dance group	6th	
Giang Brothers	12	Acrobatics	Acrobatic duo	5th	
Gruffydd Wyn Roberts	12	Singing	Singer (opera)	4th	
Han & Fran	18	Singing	Singing duo	9th	
Haribow	17	Variety	Double Dutch group	11th	
Harry Moulding	18	Magic	Magician	1st	
The Hawkstone Farmer's Choir	19	Singing	Choir	1st	
Hear Our Voice	18	Singing	Choir	7th	
Hollie Steel	3	Singing	Singer	6th	
Innocent Masuku	17	Singing	Singer (opera)	4th	
Isaac Waddington	9	Singing / music	Singer & pianist	5th	
Issy Simpson	11	Magic	Magician	2nd	
Jack & Tim	12	Singing / music	Singing & guitarist duo	8th	
Jack Carroll	7	Comedy	Stand up comedian	2nd	
Jack Pack	8	Singing	Vocal group (jazz)	4th	
Jack Rhodes	17	Magic	Magician	2nd	
Jai McDowall	5	Singing	Singer	1st	
James and Dylan Piper	14	Magic	Magic duo	5th	
James Hobley	5	Dance	Dancer (contemporary)	8th	
James Smith	8	Singing / music	Singer & guitarist	6th	
Jamie Leahey	15	Comedy	Ventriloquist	2nd	
Jamie Raven	9	Magic	Magician	2nd	
Janey Cutler	4	Singing	Singer	9th	
Jasmine Elcock	10	Singing	Singer	4th	
Jasmine Rice	18	Singing	Singer (opera)	6th	
Jasper Cherry	14	Magic	Magician	8th	
Jean Martyn	5	Music	Organist	10th	
Jesse-Jane McParland	9	Acrobatics	Martial artist	8th	
Jon Clegg	8	Comedy	Impressionist	7th	
Jon Courtenay	14	Comedy / singing / music	Comic singer & pianist	1st	
Jonathan and Charlotte	6	Singing	Singing duo (opera)	2nd	
Jonathan Goodwin	13	Danger	Escapologist	8th	
Jordan O'Keefe	7	Singing / music	Singer & guitarist	6th	
Joseph Charm	18	Comedy	Stand up comedian	5th	
Jules O'Dwyer & Matisse	9	Animals	Dog act	1st	
Julian Smith	3	Music	Saxophonist	3rd	
Kai and Natalia	6	Dance	Dance duo (ballroom)	11th	
Kate and Gin	2	Animals	Dog act	Finalist	
Kieran Gaffney	4	Music	Drummer	3rd	
Kojo Anim	13	Comedy	Stand up comedian	4th	
Kombat Breakers	1	Dance	Dance group	Finalist	
Kyle Tomlinson	11	Singing	Singer	6th	
Les Gibson	5	Comedy	Impressionist	9th	
Lettice Rowbotham	8	Music	Violinist	8th	
Liam McNally	4	Singing	Boy soprano	10th	
Libby & Charlie	13	Dance	Dance duo	10th	
Lillianna Clifton	16	Dance	Dancer (contemporary)	2nd	
Liwei Yang	19	Variety	Foot juggler	10th	
Loren Allred	15	Singing	Singer	9th	
Lost Voice Guy	12	Comedy	Stand up comedian	1st	
Loveable Rogues	6	Singing	Acoustic trio	4th	
Lucy Kay	8	Singing	Singer (opera)	2nd	
Luminites	7	Singing / music	Band	5th	
Magical Bones	14	Magic	Magician	9th	
Malakai Bayoh	16	Singing	Singer (opera)	4th	
Marc McMullan	13	Singing	Singer	7th	
Matt Edwards	11	Comedy / magic	Comic magician	4th	
Matty Juniosa	19	Singing	Singer	4th	
Maxwell Thorpe	15	Singing	Singer (opera)	4th	
Mel & Jamie	10	Singing	Singing duo	12th	
The Mend	6	Singing	Boy band	7th	
MerseyGirls	11	Dance	Dance group	9th	
Michael Collings	5	Singing / music	Singer & guitarist	5th	
Micky P Kerr	12	Comedy / singing / music	Comic singer & guitarist	10th	
Mike Woodhams	17	Singing / comedy	Impressionist singer	7th	
Missing People Choir	11	Singing	Choir	8th	
Molly Rainford	6	Singing	Singer	6th	
Musa Motha	16	Dance	Dancer (contemporary)	5th	
Nabil Abdulrashid	14	Comedy	Stand up comedian	4th	
The Neales	9	Singing	Vocal group	9th	
Ned Woodman	11	Comedy	Stand up comedian	10th	
Nemesis	2	Dance	Dance group	Finalist	
New Bounce	5	Singing	Boy band	3rd	
Northants Sings Out	17	Singing	Choir	9th	
Nu Sxool	6	Dance	Dance group	8th	
Old Men Grooving	9	Dance	Dance group	4th	
Olivia Lynes	16	Singing	Musical theatre singer	9th	
Olly Pearson	18	Music	Guitarist	4th	
Only Boys Aloud	6	Singing	Choir	3rd	
Paddy & Nico	8	Dance	Dance duo (salsa)	9th	
Paul Burling	4	Comedy	Impressionist	5th	
Paul Gbegbaje	5	Music	Pianist	6th	
Paul Potts	1	Singing	Singer (opera)	1st	
The Pensionalities	11	Singing	Singing duo	5th	
Ping Pong Pang	18	Dance	Dance group	10th	
Pre Skool	7	Dance	Dance group	9th	
Rafferty Coope	19	Magic	Magician	5th	
Razy Gogonea	5	Dance	Breakdancer	4th	
Richard and Adam	7	Singing	Singing duo (opera)	3rd	
Richard Jones	10	Magic	Magician	1st	
Robert White	12	Comedy / singing / music	Comic singer & keyboardist	2nd	
Ronan Parke	5	Singing	Singer	2nd	
Ryan O'Shaughnessy	6	Singing / music	Singer & guitarist	5th	
Sadeck Berrabah & LMA	19	Dance	Dance group	8th	
Sam Kelly	6	Singing / music	Singer & guitarist	9th	
Sarah Ikumu	11	Singing	Singer	7th	
Shaheen Jafargholi	3	Singing	Singer	7th	
Shannon & Peter	10	Dance	Dance duo (ballet)	11th	
Shaun Smith	3	Singing	Singer	9th	
Sign Along With Us	14	Singing	Choir	2nd	
Signature	2	Dance	Dance duo (Bhangra)	2nd	
Siobhan Phillips	13	Comedy / singing / music	Comic singer & pianist	9th	
Sonny Green	19	Variety	Poet	6th	
Spelbound	4	Acrobatics	Gymnastics group	1st	
Ssaulabi Performance Troupe	17	Acrobatics	Martial arts troupe	10th	
Stacey Leadbeatter	18	Singing	Singer	11th	
Stavros Flatley	3	Dance	Dance duo	4th	
Steve Hewlett	7	Comedy	Ventriloquist	4th	
Steve Royle	14	Comedy / variety	Comic juggler	3rd	
Steven Hall	5	Dance	Comic dancer	7th	
Strike	2	Acrobatics	Martial arts duo	Finalist	
Susan Boyle	3	Singing	Singer	2nd	
Sydnie Christmas	17	Singing	Singer	1st	
Ted Hill	19	Comedy	Stand up comedian	7th	
Tina and Chandi	4	Animals	Dog act	4th	
The Trickstars	17	Animals	Dog act	5th	
Trip Hazard	10	Animals	Dog act	7th	
Trixy	17	Magic	Magician	6th	
Tobias Mead	4	Dance	Dancer	6th	
Tokio Myers	11	Music	Pianist	1st	
Tom Ball	15	Singing	Singer	3rd	
Tonikaku	16	Variety	Novelty act	11th	
Travis George	16	Singing	Singer (opera)	8th	
Twist and Pulse	4	Dance	Comic dance duo	2nd	
UDI	9	Dance	Dance group (blacklight)	10th	
Viggo Venn	16	Comedy	Comedian	1st	
Vinnie McKee	18	Singing	Singer	8th	
Wayne Woodward	10	Singing	Singer (jazz)	2nd	
X	13	Magic	Magician	2nd	
Yanis Marshall, Arnaud & Mehdi	8	Dance	Heel dance trio	11th	
