= Steve Hewlett =

Steve Hewlett may refer to:

- Steve Hewlett (journalist) (1958–2017), British print and radio journalist
- Steve Hewlett (ventriloquist), finalist on the seventh series of Britain's Got Talent
