= Lurine Cato =

British gospel music singer-songwriter

Lurine Lilian Cato MBE
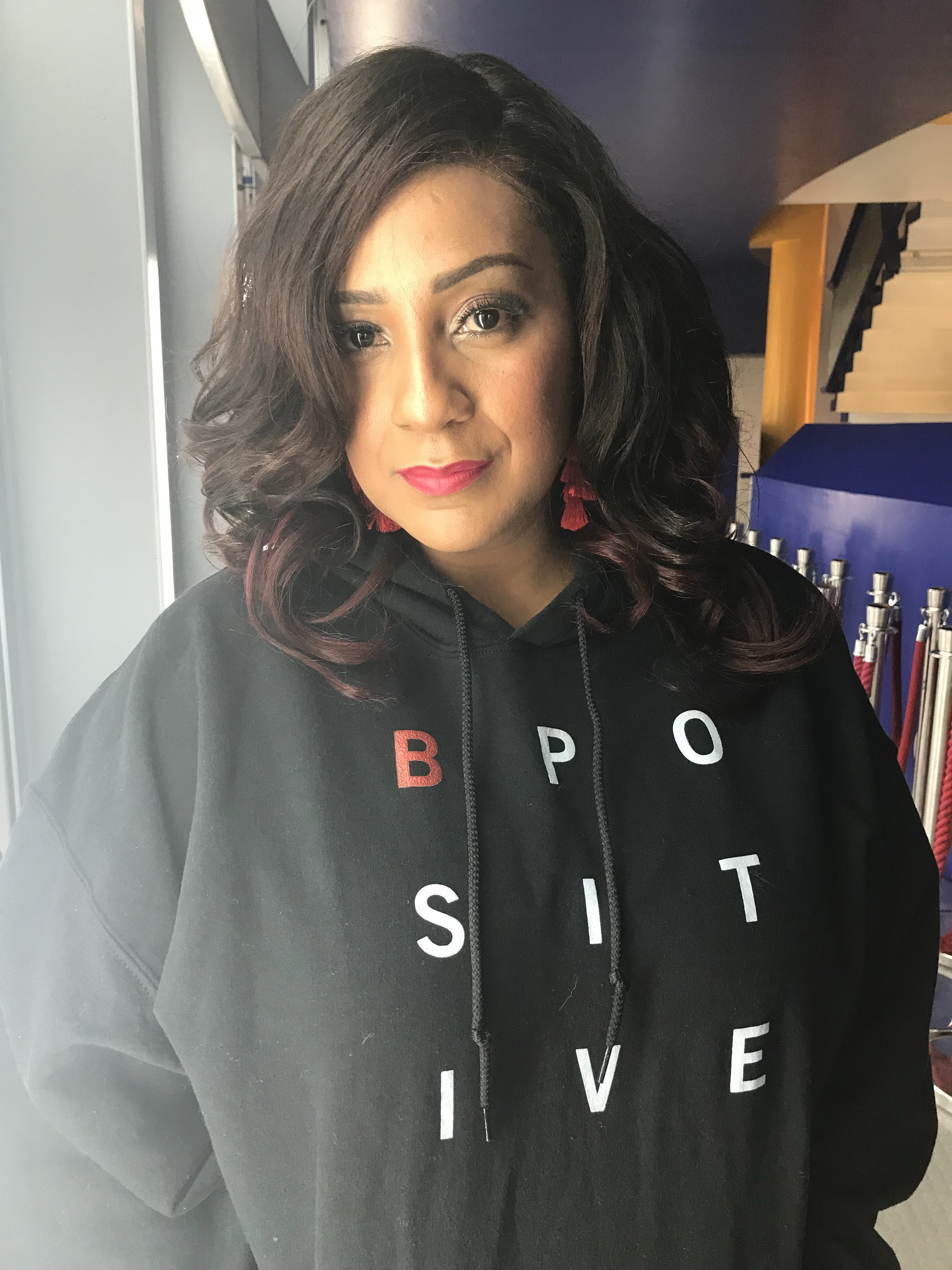
- Britain's Got Talent with the B Positive Choir 2018

Background information
- Born: Lurine Lilian Cato; 9 September 1974 (age 51); London, England
- Genres: Gospel; Soul; R&B; Jazz; Dance
- Occupations: Singer; Songwriter; Session Vocalist; Vocal Tutor; Public Speaker
- Instrument: Vocals
- Years active: 2008–present
- Label: Indie
- Website: https://www.lurinecatomusic.com

Lurine Lilian Cato MBE (born 9 September 1974) is a British gospel singer, songwriter, and session vocalist. She won the MOBO Award for Best Gospel Act in 2013 and was a finalist on the 12th season of Britain's Got Talent in 2018 with the B Positive Choir. In 2019 she appeared on the BBC programme Songs of Praise. In 2020, she was appointed a Member of the Order of the British Empire (MBE) for her contributions to charity and music.

== Early life ==
Cato was born on 9 September 1974 into a family of 11 children.

She began her musical career at age three at the COGIC UK National Convention. At age 8, she entered the Enfield London Borough Council, performing Deniece Williams' 'Let's Hear It For The Boy' where she won second place. The following year, she won first place with a rendition of George Benson's 'The Greatest Love of All' and was consequently awarded the Aunty G Cup.

== Career ==
Cato toured with the Lighthouse Family and Lynden David Hall in her mid-twenties. She later formed a duo, Redeemed, with Marie Carter. The duo performed as opening acts for artists such as Hezekiah Walker, Kirk Franklin, and the Bibleway Mass Choir.

As a backing vocalist, Cato toured with Australian singer Kylie Minogue on two tours in the early 2000s. In 2008, Cato recorded vocals for Adele's debut album 19 on the track 'Best For Last'. She performed at the 2012 London Olympics for the Evening of Olympians celebration.

Cato was a featured artist at the first annual European True Worship Summit, a gospel conference at the Dominion Centre in Wood Green. The event culminated in a final concert where the B Positive Choir performed with Cato.

Cato was invited by the Mayor of London Sadiq Khan to sing at his campaign dinner held at the Museum of London and was appointed as the official Vocal Coach for ITV's Sing It To Win It Competition 2018. The competition presenters included Girls Aloud member Kimberley Walsh and UK-based Afropop and Dancehall duo Reggie 'n' Bollie.

Cato has been involved with the NHS 70th Celebrations performing at York Minster Cathedral. Lurine was the featured soloist with the B Positive choir at Westminster Abbey, a service of celebration for Commonwealth Day. Other performers included the Dhol Foundation drummers, Clean Bandit, William Barton and Alfie Boe.

On 20 October 2019, Cato performed at Rudolph Walker's OBE 80th birthday celebrations at the Hackney Empire. On 17 and 24 November 2019, BBC1 aired its semi-final and final rounds of Songs of Praise' Gospel Choir of the Year, where Cato made a special guest appearance. She was appointed Member of the Order of the British Empire (MBE) in the 2020 Birthday Honours for services to charity and music.

On 6 March 2020, she was awarded the International Women's Day Award by the Mayor of Enfield along with Her Excellency Justina Mutale and Team GB sprinter and Olympics medal winner Desiree Henry.

On 14 December 2021, Cato attended her investiture at Windsor Castle to be presented with the MBE award for services to charity and music. The award was presented by Princess Anne.

=== Britain's Got Talent 2018 ===
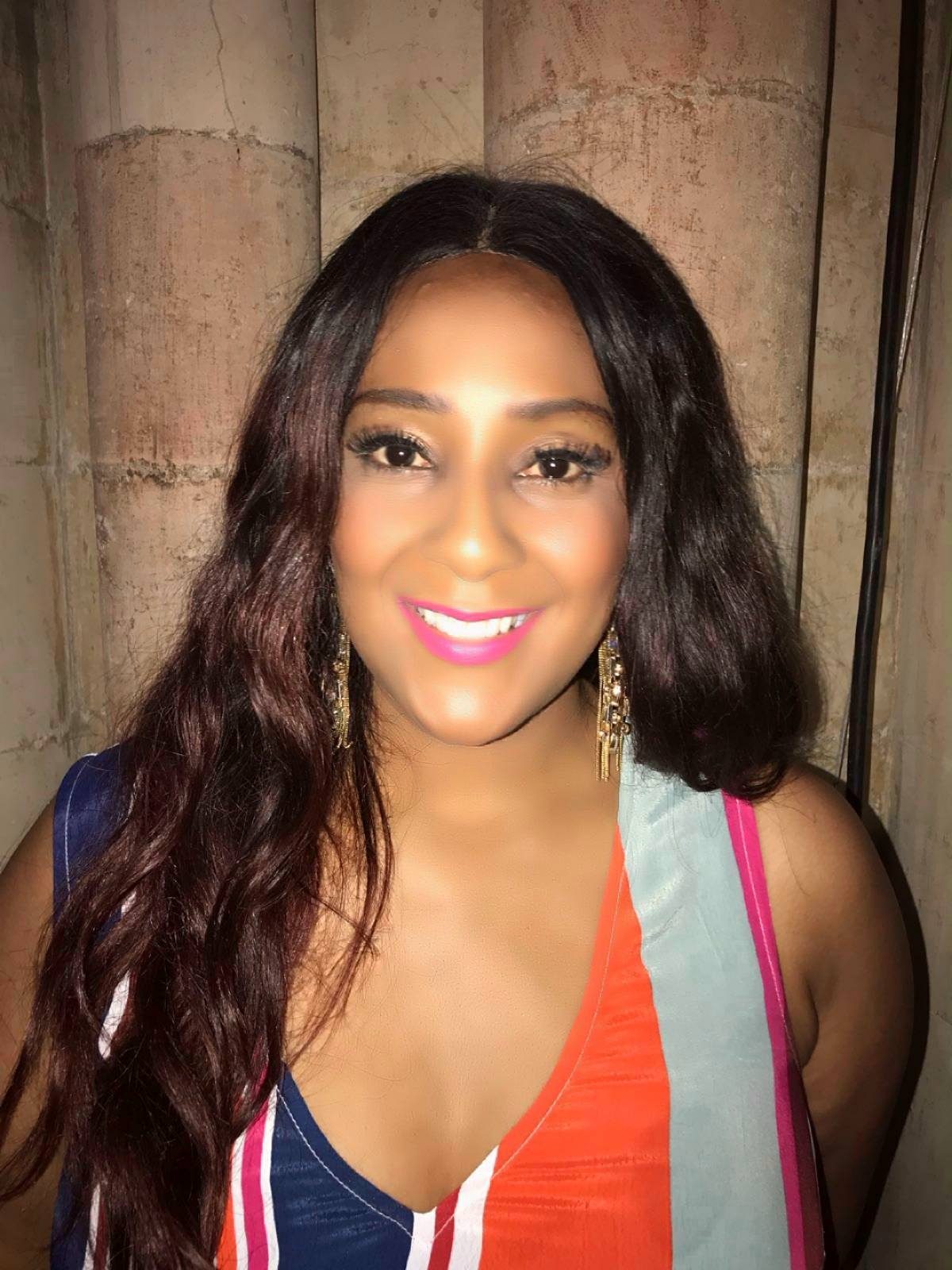
Lurine at the NHS 70th Celebration, York Minster Cathedral

Cato and the B Positive Choir participated in the Britain's Got Talent 2018 competition. After a successful audition on 14 April 2018 on ITV, they received a Yes vote from all four judges. The judges, combined with a public vote, ultimately sent Calum Courtney through to the finals. A decision between Calum and the B Positive choir moved Simon Cowell to give B Positive a wild card.

After a week of performances, the wild card recipient was reported in OK Magazine sending B Positive to the finals of Britain's Got Talent. Cato and the B Positive Choir reprised their audition song. Though they made it through to the finals, they did not make it to the top three.

=== Awards ===
Cato's music award wins - aside from her MOBO Awards and nomination - the Premier Gospel Award (Best Female Artist) in 2016 and 2017, GMA Italy (Best International Vocalist of the Year), BEFFTA Award 2013 (Best Gospel Act), Wise Woman Award 2012 (WWA Woman In Music Award), and an Honorary UK Entertainment Award 2017 (Outstanding Contribution to Gospel Music).

== Charitable work ==
Lurine Cato has participated in various charity-related musical performances. In 2016, she performed at St. James’s Palace for the Diana Award’s INSPIRE series, which recognizes young people for their contributions to their communities.

In November 2017, she performed at the MOBO Awards with the B Positive Choir at the First Direct Arena in Leeds, England. The following month, the choir released a charity single, Rise Up, originally sung by Andra Day, with Lurine Cato as the lead vocalist. Later that December, she sang Christmas songs with the choir at St. Pancras station.

On 11 June 2019, Cato and the B Positive Choir performed at the Audi Sentebale Concert at Hampton Court Palace alongside artists such as Rita Ora, Morena Leraba, and the Inala Zulu Ballet. The event was in support of Sentebale, a charity focused on assisting children affected by HIV in South Africa.

== Community work ==
Cato sang at One Minute in May, a concert focusing on young victims of violent crime held outside Downing Street.

Cato presented and performed at HM Prison Elmley for the Aspire Higher Violence Reduction Program, focusing on personal development, self-reflection, breaking bad habits, positive thinking, motivation, and general inspiration for prisoners and staff.

Cato formed The Mighty Men Experience, a program highlighting positive male role models in society and reducing knife and gun crime. She created the anthem "Keep Fighting", used as the project's main theme.

In April 2020, Cato and several notable British artists came together to record the popular hymn 'Great Is Thy Faithfulness' in response to the COVID-19 pandemic.

Cato collaborated with singers from the UK and abroad to record Amazing Grace by Dottie Rambo in aid of the Cavall Nurses' Trust. The effort, led by Cato, raised funds for National Health Service nurses who faced personal and financial challenges.

== Discography ==
Release	Album	Tracks	Label
October 2016	Chosen To Serve	13	Fresh Manna Records
Singles
Release	Song	Tracks	Label
2022	"Lamb Of God"	1	WorldWide
2019	"Keep Turning"	1	Fresh Manna Records
2018	"Be Loved"	1	Fresh Manna Records
2017	"Rise Up" (Lead Vocals)	1	B Positive Choir
2016	"Wave It Away"	1	Fresh Manna Records
2016	"Power"	1	Fresh Manna Records
2016	"Power" (Rare Candy Deep Mix)	1	Fresh Manna Records
2016	"Power" (Rare Candy Club Mix)	1	Fresh Manna Records
2016	"Power" (Giant Killer Mix)	1	Fresh Manna Records
2016	"Power" (Extended)	1	Fresh Manna Records
2016	"Keep Fighting" (The Mighty Men Choir)	1	
2012	"Following The Star (Closer)" [Feat. Tony Momrelle & Jay Ess]	1	
2012	"Following The Star (Closer)" [Remix] [Feat. Tony Momrelle & Jay Ess]	1	
2016	"You Revive Me" (Green Remix)	1	Fresh Manna Records
2012	"You Revive Me"	1	Fresh Manna Records
2012	"You Revive Me" (Remix)	1	Fresh Manna Records
2002	"Shout It" [Feat. Brixton Gospel Choir]	1	Check Mate Records
2002	"We'll Get Thru It" [Feat. Royalty]	1	Self Released
2000	"Soul Inside"	1	Baby Angel Recordings
Various Album Appearances
2003	Lost In Love (Sgt Slick vs. John Course DubKlash) Andy Van – Vicious Cuts – Top Tunes From Australia's Top Label (CD, Mixed, Comp)		Ministry (Magazine) Australia
2003	Lost In Love DJ John Course – A Night Out With Vicious Grooves (CD, Mixed)		Vicious Vinyl, Vicious Grooves, Festival Mushroom Records
2002	We'll Get Thru It Various – Twice As Nice Presents Mobo 2002 (The Very Best Of Urban) (2xCD, Comp, Mixed)		Warner Dance
2000	FriendsTony Touch – R&B #25 – Get Your Sh*t Straight (CD, Mixed)		Touch Entertainment
2000	FriendsDJ Poska – What's The Flavor? 40 (Cass, Mixed, Promo)		Funky Maestro Entertainment
2000	Friends (The Sovereign Mix) – EZ Pure Garage 3		Warner Strategic Marketing UK, Warner Music UK Ltd.
Other Writing/Arranging
2012	You Revive Me – You Revive Me (CDr, Single)		Fresh Manna Records
2003	I Don't Mind Tellin UGalactic Mutherland / Tiffany Persons – Destiny / Best Of Me (12")		Varsity International
Vocals (Various)
2015	Wash The Pain Away [Markus Feehily – Fire] (CD, Album, Dlx)		Harmoney Entertainment
2015	Changing (Radio Edit) Various – Fack ju Göhte 2 (Original Saundträck Zum Film)(CD)		Polydor
2015	Changing (Sigma's VIP Remix Feat. Stylo G)Various – Drum & Bass Arena 2015 (3xCD, Mixed)		AEI Music
2013	Hand On Heart (Radio Mix)Olly Murs – Right Place Right Time (CD, Album + DVD-V, NTSC + S/Edition)		Syco Music, Epic, Sony Music
2010	The Winter Of My SpringsIncognito – Transatlantic R.P.M.		Dome Records
2006	Seamus Haji & Steve Mac Feat. Erire – Happy (12")		Big Love
2003	Lost In LoveDJ John Course* – A Night Out With Vicious Grooves (CD, Mixed)		Vicious Vinyl, Vicious Grooves, Festival Mushroom Records
2002	I Will Follow (Full Intention Club Mix)Various – Las Tardes En Ibiza (2002) (2xCD, Mixed, Comp)		Vendetta Records
2002	I Will Follow (Full Intention Club Mix)Various – Danceclub Awards 01 (2xCD, Comp)		Kaos Records, Vidisco
2002	I Will Follow Various – Electricidade 2002 (2xCD, Comp)		Vidisco
2002	I Will Follow (Wally Lopez & Dr. Kucho Weekend Remix)Various – Funktásticamix – This Is True House Music #2(2xCD, Comp, Mixed)		Funktástica Records
2002	Una Mas – I Will Follow		Hussle Recordings
2002	I Will Follow You (Full Intention Club Mix)Various – Disco Heaven 02.02 (2xCD, Comp)		Hed Kandi
2002	Tom The ModelBeth Gibbons & Rustin Man – Out Of Season		Go! Beat
2001	All I Need (Deep Swing Filter Vocal) Una Mas – All I Need (12")		Union Square Recordings
2001	Curtains		Polydor
2000	Independence Day Gabrielle – Rise		Go! Beat
Various Music Credits
Release	Album	Artist	Credit
2021	All I Need (Is Believe)	Milk & Sugar	Lead Vocals
2019	Rocketman [Original Motion Picture Soundtrack] – "Tiny Dancer"	Elton John / Taron Egerton	Vocals (Background)
2019	Wasteland, Baby!	Hozier	Vocals (Background)
2013	James Arthur	James Arthur	Choir/Chorus, Vocals (Background)
2010	Transatlantic R.P.M.	Incognito	Vocals (Background)
2007	Imaginacion	Debbie	Chorus
2007	Louie Vega in the House		Composer
2007	Stereo Sushi Version 10		Composer
2007	Connected: Full Intention		Producer
2006	For the Love of House, Vol. 3		Vocals (Background)
2006	Soul Heaven Presents DJ Spen & Osunlade		Composer
2003	Club Nation 2002, Vol. 2	Dynamix	Vocals
2002	Clubber's Guide to 2000	Judge Jules	Vocals
2002	Defected Sessions: Full Intention and Smokinojo	Masters at Work	Vocals
2002	Kylie Fever 2002: Live in Manchester	Kylie Minogue	Vocals (Background)
2002	Out of Season	Beth Gibbons / Rustin Man	Vocals (Background)
2001	21st Century Disco [Smooth]		Vocals
2001	Beetroot	Cast	Vocals (Background)
2001	You'll Love to Hate This	Richard Blackwood	Vocals
2000	Rise	Gabrielle	Vocals (Background)
	Tales from the Beach/Transatlantic R.P.M.	Incognito	Vocals (Background)

== Awards and nominations ==
Year	Award	Category	City	Result
2022	Urban Music Awards	Best Gospel Act	UK	Winner
2021	The Lavine Hudson Award for Vocal Excellence	Step4wd Award	UK	Winner
2021	The Music Media Platform Awards	Community Hero	UK	Winner
2020	TTM Collective Orchestra (UK) (Inspirational Love Songs Masterpiece feat. Various Artists including Lurine Cato & David Copeland 'My Greatest & My Latest Inspiration')	Best Gospel Music Album of the Year	USA	Winner
2020	MBE	Awardee	UK	Appointed
2020	International Women's Day Mayor's Award	Awardee	UK	Awarded
2018	Trulife Gospel Music Awards	Best Female	UK	Pending
2018	Premier Gospel Awards	Best Female Act	UK	Nominated
2017	MOBO Awards	Best Gospel Act	UK	Nominated
2017	UEA	Outstanding Contribution to Gospel Music	UK	Honorary
2017	Premier Gospel Awards	Best Female Artist	UK	Winner
2016	Gospel Xplosion Music Media Awards	Best RnB Female Artist of the Year	UK	Winner
2016	Premier Gospel Awards	Best Female Artist	UK	Winner
2016	Gospel Music Awards	Best International Artist	Italy	Winner
2016	Gospel Music Awards	Best International Female Artist of the Year	Italy	Winner
2014	Gospel Music Awards	Best International Female Vocalist of the Year	Italy	Winner
2014	Gospel Music Awards	Best International Live Concert	Italy	Winner
2014	Gospel Music Awards	Best International Music Event	Italy	Winner
2013	Gospel Music Awards	Best International Song of the Year	Italy	Winner
2013	Praisetek Awards	Best RnB Gospel Artist	UK	Winner
2013	BEFFTA Awards	Best Gospel Act	UK	Winner
2013	MOBO Awards	Best Gospel Act	UK	Winner
2012	Wise Woman Awards	Music	UK	Winner
