= ReConnected =

British vocal group

- Origin: Manchester, England
- Genres: Pop music, Boy band
- Years active: 2010–2014
- Label: Bannatyne Music
- Past members: Max Mondryk; Harry Mondryk; Matt Fitzgerald

ReConnected was a British vocal group that was formed in July 2010, and disbanded in January 2014. The group was formed by three members of the boy band Connected – Max Mondryk and Harry Mondryk, and Matthew Fitzgerald – after the band achieved success during the fourth series of Britain's Got Talent earlier that year, before the Modryks and Fitzgerald chose to split from the boy band and form their vocal group.

== History ==
=== Early career ===
In 2010, Max and Harry Mondryk, along with Matthew Fitzgerald, formed up with twin brothers Myles and Connor Ryan to create the boy band Connected. The group auditioned for a place in the fourth series of Britain's Got Talent, coming in eighth place overall in the British competition. Their success led to the group performing together on the Britain's Got Talent Live Tour that year, in which they included several songs in their performances, including "Never Forget" by Take That, "Everybody in Love" by JLS, and "Don't Stop Me Now" by Queen. Their last gig was on 18 July, at the Midlands Music Festival in Tamworth, which had an attendance figure of over 20,000.

On 30 July 2010, the Mondryks and Fitzgerald split with the Ryans to form a new band, announcing their decision on Facebook. Both of the Ryans were disappointed and upset, with Connor commenting that: "We were there the day before and they were our best friends. Nothing was wrong, we didn't fall out and it was just very confusing.... We found out on the internet, like most of the other fans. It was horrible." While the Ryans would go on to perform as a singing duo, the other three members named their new group as ReConnected, signing on to record labels Cent Management and Freedom Management, the latter of whom was provided by the members promoter in Connected, Kevin Newton. As part of their new group, ReConnected received assistance from songwriter-producer Tim Woodcock to develop songs and music for their performances.

=== 2010–2014: Performances and disbandment ===
Following their formation, ReConnected recorded six tracks which they first sung live in May 2011, titled: "ReConnected", "Superhuman", "Seeing Stars", "December", "Wish You Were Here" and "Stranded". The group also released short acoustic versions of these songs, and held a launch show on 26 May at Sound Control in Manchester, United Kingdom (UK). After the launch received high demand and sold out, a new launch show was created for 2 June, which was filmed for a documentary and music video. Further launch shows were then created, for venues in Nottingham, Newcastle upon Tyne, Birmingham, Bristol and Bournemouth.

The group went on to broadcast a weekly radio show, titled "The ReConnected Radio Show", the internet radion station UK Undiscovered, with their premiere episode featuring the group ghost hunting.

On 19 September 2012, the band announced it had signed to the record label RKA Records, founded by Ryan Ashmore and Liam Webb, and part owned by Duncan Bannatyne after the pair appeared on the BBC's Dragon's Den. ReConnected worked on a single, "One in a Million", which debuted on 13 February 2012 at Manchester Academy. While some of its members were attending high school, ReConnected continued to keep in touch with fans using social media. On 17 November 2012, they performed at the Preston Christmas Lights Switch-On, along with many more in the north.

On 6 January 2013, ReConnected announced it would be a supporting act for Little Mix on a 22-city tour that year. On 17 March, the group released a new single, titled "One in A Million", featuring a music video that featured Bannatyne in a bit part, and including remixes from Radio Edit and Harry's Dub Remix. An EP of the single was also created, featuring two additional remix tracks: Hardino Remix and Steve C Remix. It debuted at number 32 on the UK Singles Chart. Sales of single impressed Bannatyne, who described his reaction as being "over the moon by the midweek result". The group later recorded its debut album with Woodcock. In July, ReConnected travelled to Ibiza to film the music video for their second single, "Time of Our Lives", The video was released on 12 September, and the single on 20 October. It reached number 33 on the UK Charts, and number 3 on the UK Indie Single Chart.

Rumour soon began to circulate towards the end of 2013 that the group were preparing to split up. On 31 January 2014, ReConnected posted a video message confirming these rumours, explaining that their decision to separate was to pursue solo careers.

== Personnel ==
Harry Mondryk and Max Mondryk are from Whitefield. Harry had previously auditioned for Britain's Got Talent three times. He has also studied for a BTEC in music at Burnley College. Matt Fitzgerald is from Burnage in Manchester and studied A Levels at Xaverian College with a view to attending university

== Discography ==
=== Singles ===
Year	Title	Chart position		
Year	Title	UK	UK Indie	Scotland
2013	"One in a Million"	32	4	35
2013	"Time of Our Lives"	33	3	—
