= Savage Digital Ltd =

Record label

Savage Digital Ltd.
- Trade name: Savage Digital Ltd
- Company type: Private
- Industry: Music & entertainment
- Genre: Pop, Dance, Teen
- Founded: October 2010
- Founders: Ryan Ashmore & Liam Webb
- Headquarters: London, United Kingdom
- Key people: Duncan Bannatyne, Ryan Ashmore, Liam Webb
- Products: Music & entertainment
- Owner: Sony Music Entertainment
- Parent: Sony Music Entertainment
- Website: Bannatyne Music

Savage Digital Ltd was a record label that was originally known as RKA Records, then as Bannatyne Music. It was first established in October 2010 by Ryan Ashmore and Liam Webb, and received investment on the BBC TV Show Dragons Den.

== History ==
Ashmore and Webb successfully gained investment from Duncan Bannatyne on the Dragon's Den in 2011. Bannatyne got a 79% share of the company in return for a £50,000 investment, the largest proportion of equity bought on the show. In 2012 RKA Records was renamed Bannatyne Music, and subsequently managed by Kevin Savage. In 2018 the company again changed its name to Savage Digital Ltd. The label is currently dormant.

== Artists ==
- ReConnected
- Jay Milly
