= Harry Moulding =

English magician (born 2000)

- Born: June 2000 (age 25); Blackpool, Lancashire, England
- Occupation: Magician
- Years active: 2020–present
- Known for: Britain's Got Talent
- Website: https://www.harrymoulding.co.uk/

Harry Moulding (born June 2000) is an English magician who won the eighteenth series of Britain's Got Talent.

== Biography ==
Moulding was born in Blackpool in June 2000. In May 2025, he won the eighteenth series of Britain's Got Talent after being put straight through to the final by KSI, who pressed the Live Show Golden Buzzer.

At the time of his audition, he was aged 24 and was working as a magician. He has been performing magic since the age of 10. When asked what he'd do if he won the show, he responded 'As well as performing as part of the Royal Variety Performance which would be a dream come true, if I was going to use the money it would have to be Vegas, I would use the money, try and create a show as big as I can and take it to the big stage'.

== See also ==
- Britain's Got Talent series 18
- List of Britain's Got Talent finalists
- List of magicians
