= The Hawkstone Farmers Choir =

- Choir
- Founded: 2025; 1 year ago
- Founder: Jeremy Clarkson
- Website: thehawkstonefarmerschoir.com

The Hawkstone Farmers Choir are a choir who won the 19th series of Britain's Got Talent, being the first choir to win.

They released their first single, "Absolution", in October 2026.
