= Jon Clegg =

British comedian and impressionist (born 1970)

- Born: Jonathan Clegg; 7 April 1970 (age 56); Crawley, West Sussex, England
- Occupations: Comedian, impressionist
- Years active: 1990–present
- Television: Britain's Got Talent (2014); Newzoids (2015–2016)
- Spouse: Tracy Clegg
- Website: Official website

Jonathan Clegg (born 7 April 1970) is a British comedian and impressionist, who is best known for finishing seventh in the eighth series of Britain's Got Talent.

== Career ==
=== Stage ===
Clegg has starred in a number of pantomimes, including Snow White & the Seven Dwarfs in Crawley in 2010-11, Cinderella in 2007-08 and Aladdin, in 2006-07, both in Brighton.

He played Simple Simon in the production of Jack and the Beanstalk at The Hexagon from 2013-14. He then starred once again as Buttons in Cinderella in the 2014-15 panto season at the same theatre. He starred in the 2015-16 pantomime Snow White alongside Sherrie Hewson at the Imagine Theatre in Coventry. In 2016-17, he will appear as Simple Simon in Jack and the Beanstalk, starring alongside former winner of The X Factor, Sam Bailey. Jon also toured the UK with the hit show Forever In Blue Jeans in the late 1990s & then again from 2004 till 2010.

=== Britain's Got Talent ===
Clegg was a contestant on the eighth series of Britain's Got Talent between April and May 2014. During his first audition which was aired on 10 May, Clegg did impressions of well-known people including Alan Carr, Marcus Bentley, Homer and Marge Simpson, Louis Walsh, and Simon Cowell. After impressing the judges, he went through to the next round.

His next performance was during the semi-final round on 26 May. Once again, he did impressions; this time of Paul O'Grady, Peter Dickson, Alan Hansen, David Beckham, John Bishop, Paddy McGuinness, Ant & Dec and Michael McIntyre. He was in the top three in the public vote later that night, but after the judges failed to reach a majority, Clegg was eliminated leaving illusionist Darcy Oake to take the place in the Britain's Got Talent final.

On 4 June 2014, a few days before the final, it was announced that Clegg was chosen by the judges as the series' 'wildcard act' and given a spot in the final. In the Britain's Got Talent series 8 final, Jon Clegg performed impressions of Ant & Dec, Homer Simpson, Marge Simpson, Kermit the Frog, Miss Piggy, Sarah Millican, Keith Lemon, Louis Walsh, and impressionist Jenson Zhu who competed in the series, but did not make it to the final . Clegg finished in seventh place overall, and later stated that his father was his inspiration.

Clegg appeared in the 2016 series of Britain's Got Talent, during a performance which celebrated some of the best acts to take part in the last nine years of the show. The performance was organised by Ashley Banjo of Diversity.

=== After Britain's Got Talent ===
Since 2015, he has voiced various characters in the ITV series Newzoids.

Since 2015 Clegg has toured Butlins and works all over the world on Cruise Ships including P&O Cruises, MSC, Celebrity, Princess and TUI Marella at resorts in the Mediterranean and Caribbean. He also continues to perform in Pantomime every year.

== Filmography ==
=== Television ===
Year	Title	Role
2014, 2016	Britain's Got Talent	Contestant, guest performer
2014	This Morning	Guest
2015—2016	Newzoids	Various voices
