= Britain's Got Talent series 19 =

Britain's Got Talent
- Series 19
- Presented by: Ant & Dec
- Judges: Simon Cowell; Amanda Holden; Alesha Dixon; KSI; Stacey Solomon (guest)
- Winner: The Hawkstone Farmers Choir
- Runner-up: Celestial

Release
- Original network: ITV1
- Original release: 21 February – 30 May 2026

Season chronology
- ← Previous; Series 18 Next → Series 20

The nineteenth series of British talent competition programme Britain's Got Talent began airing on ITV1 on 21 February 2026. Filming for the auditions began in October 2025 in Birmingham and Blackpool. The series is presented by Ant & Dec, with Simon Cowell, Amanda Holden, Alesha Dixon returning as judges, alongside KSI, who replaced Bruno Tonioli on the judging panel following his departure after three series.

The series concluded on 30 May 2026, and was won by The Hawkstone Farmers Choir, with drone display group Celestial finishing as runner-up and dog act Anastasiia & Salsa finishing in third place. It marks the first time a choir has ever won the show.

Judges and presenter(s) for Britain's Got Talent series 19

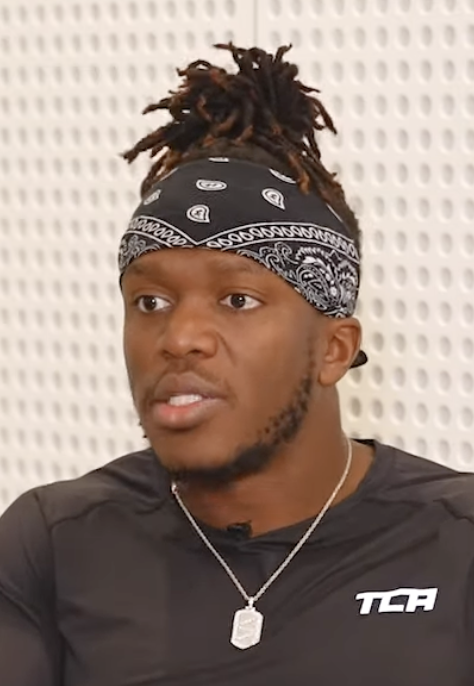
KSI

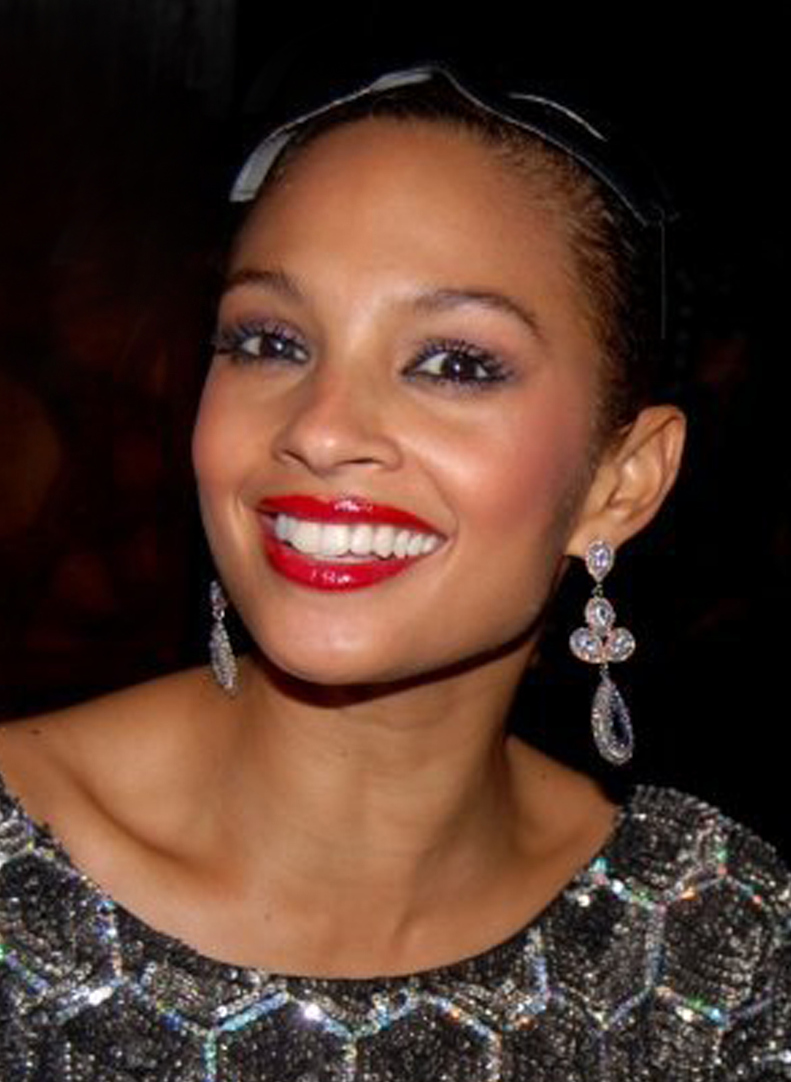
Alesha Dixon

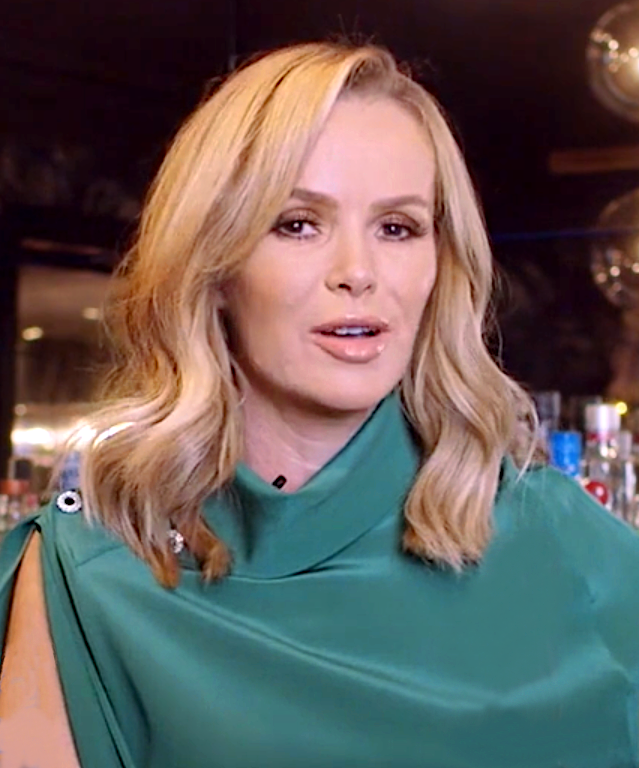
Amanda Holden

Simon Cowell

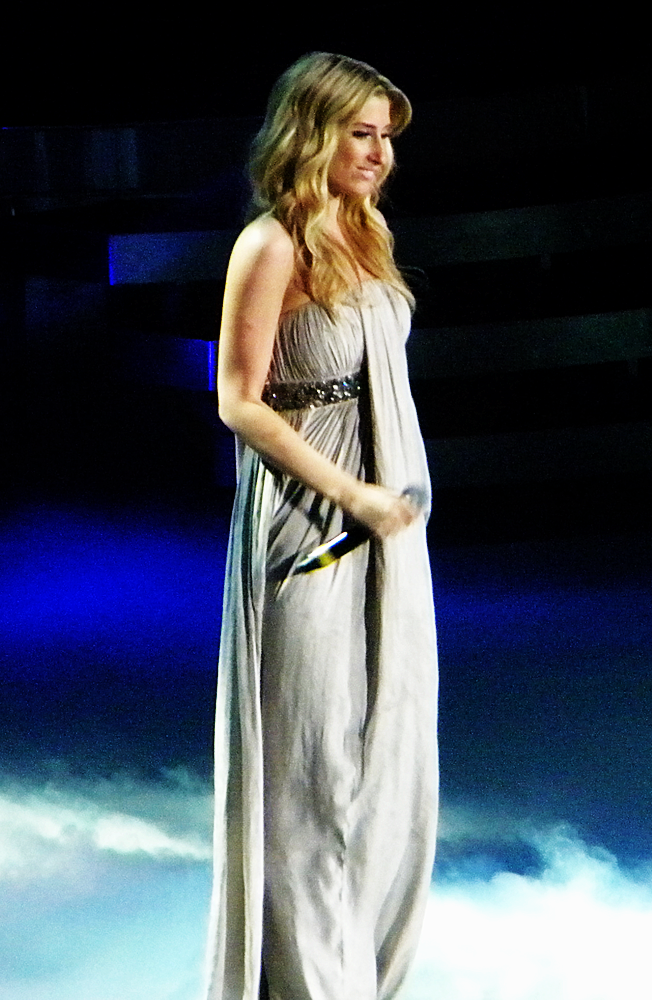
Stacey Solomon (guest)

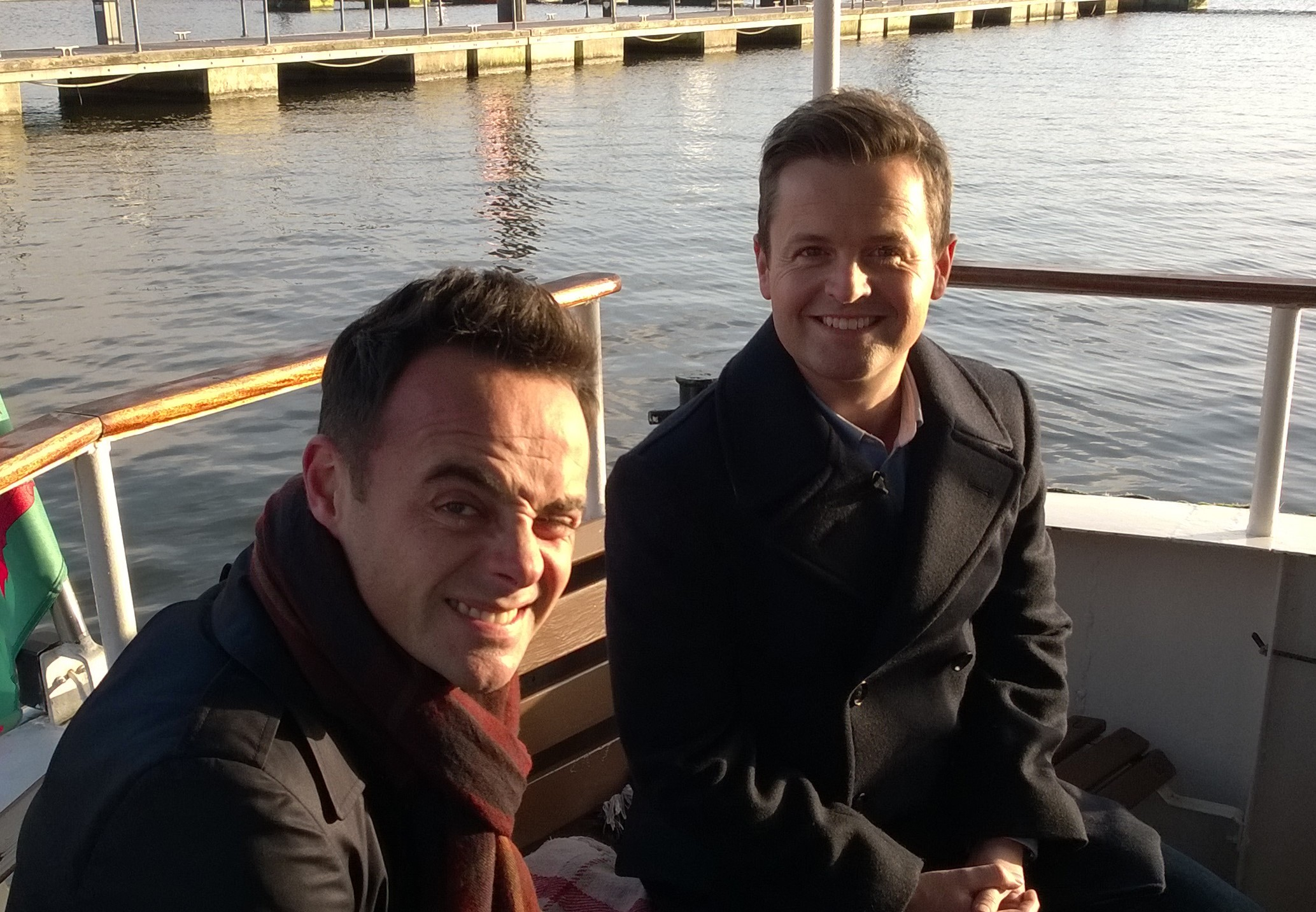
Ant & Dec

== Series overview ==
During the previous series, it was announced that the show would return for a nineteenth series with auditions opening whilst it was airing. In July 2025, it was announced that Bruno Tonioli had decided to quit the show after three years, due to his commitments as a judge on Dancing with the Stars in the United States. He was subsequently replaced by KSI, who was a guest judge on the previous series and joined Simon Cowell, Amanda Holden and Alesha Dixon on the judging panel.

Auditions for the series began on 3 October 2025 at the Birmingham Hippodrome. Auditions were originally planned to start filming the day prior, however Cowell suffered a fall and a head injury, so that day's tapings were called off. Stacey Solomon served as a guest judge in his place on the first filming day, and he would later return for the second day in Birmingham (4 October 2025), ending a two day stint in the Hippodrome. The auditions would then move to the Winter Gardens, Blackpool the following week.

The series began on 21 February 2026, and as in the previous series, would air weekly, excluding 14 March due to ITV airing live coverage of the final match weekend of the 2026 Six Nations Championship. Additionally, the 4th Semi-Final of the show would be broadcast from 6 - 8 rather than 7 - 9 on 16 May, in order to avoid clashing with the Eurovision Song Contest 2026 final airing at 8. There was a slight controversy over a last minute rule change from Cowell that allowed for Kevin Hogg to go through to the next round, after he received a split decision from the panel (with Dixon and Holden voting 'no', whilst KSI and Cowell voted 'yes'). Normally this would mean acts are eliminated, however Cowell allowed the presenters Ant & Dec to cast 'yes' votes also, subsequently allowing Hogg through. This was seen as unfair by viewers, as other acts, possibly more talented than Hogg, did not get this opportunity.

For the first time since series 14, there was no wildcard act in the final.

Winner
Runner-up
Third Place
Semi-Finalist
Golden Buzzer
Live Show Golden Buzzer

Participant	Age(s)	Genre	Act	From	Semi-final	Result
Alfredo & Coral	30 & 43	Danger	Knife Throwing Duo	Brazil & Spain	2	Eliminated
Anastasiia & Salsa	35 & 7	Animals	Dog Act	France	1	Third place
Antigravity	36–40	Variety	Multimedia Group	Ukraine	3	Eliminated
Baron & Vesper	39 & 44	Danger	Sideshow Duo	Finland	5	Eliminated
Braunstone Community Primary School	8–46	Singing / Dance	Choir & Dance Group	Braunstone, Leicester	2	Eliminated
Celestial	20–42	Variety	Drone Display Group	Somerset	5	Runner-up
Celtic Beat	6-11	Dance	Dance Group	Wales	1	Eliminated
Christy Coysh	35	Singing	Novelty Singer	Wakefield	1	Eliminated
Epic Sax Guy	41	Music	Saxophonist	Moldova	4	Eliminated
Fabian Fox	26	Magic	Magician	Austria	2	Finalist
Fraser Penman	35	Magic	Mentalist	Glasgow, Scotland	1	Eliminated
Glantaf Boys Choir	11–18	Singing	Choir	Cardiff, Wales	4	Eliminated
Jake Banfield	37	Magic	Magician	Essex	5	Eliminated
James Miller	12	Singing	Singer	Rye, East Sussex	5	Eliminated
Juan Carlos	12	Dance	Dancer	Spain	5	Eliminated
Katherine O’Malley	42	Singing	Singer	Salford, Greater Manchester	2	Eliminated
Kristel Herrera	32	Singing	Singer	Halifax, West Yorkshire	4	Eliminated
Liwei Yang	32	Variety	Foot Juggler	Taiwan	3	Finalist
Macshane & Delby	34 & 38	Singing	Freestyle Rap Duo	Australia	2	Eliminated
Matty Juniosa	27	Singing	Singer	Glasgow, Scotland	1	Finalist
Mega Unity	16–25	Dance	Dance Group	France	3	Eliminated
Mizuki Shinagawa	27	Acrobatics	Aerialist	Japan	3	Eliminated
Mr Cherry	45	Variety	Novelty Act	Japan	5	Eliminated
Nancy Tilley	12	Music	Drummer	Scarborough, North Yorkshire	1	Eliminated
Niamh Noade	17	Singing / Music	Singer & Harpist	County Armagh, Northern Ireland	3	Eliminated
Nic Vani	41	Singing	Singer	Maidstone, Kent	2	Eliminated
Paul Nunnari	52	Acrobatics	Aerialist	Sydney, Australia	1	Eliminated
Playground	16–25	Dance	Dance Group	London	3	Eliminated
Rafferty Coope	17	Magic/Musician	Magician	Winchester, Hampshire	4	Finalist
Ren DMC	35	Singing	Rapper	North London	4	Eliminated
Sadeck Berrabah & LMA	19–34	Dance	Dance Group	France & Liverpool	2	Finalist
Sonny Green	30	Variety	Poet	Southend, Essex	4	Finalist
SOS	29–33	Singing / Music	Band	Bournemouth	5	Eliminated
Ted Hill	31	Comedy	Stand Up Comedian	London	3	Finalist
The Hawkstone Farmers Choir	27–74	Singing	Choir	Various	5	Winner
The Lux City Choir	24–40	Singing	Gospel Choir	Various	3	Eliminated
The Rafikiz	20-31	Acrobatics	Acrobatic Group	Dar es Salaam, Tanzania	1	Eliminated
Wei Yamin	27	Music	PVC Pipe Drummer	Taiwan	4	Eliminated
Welsch Master Team	18–39	Acrobatics	Acrobatic Group	Switzerland	4	Eliminated
World Wings	17–28	Dance	Dance Group	Japan	2	Eliminated

=== Semi-finals summary ===
Buzzed out
Golden Buzzer

Won the Public Vote
2nd in Public Vote
3rd in Public Vote
Eliminated

Prior to the beginning of the live shows, the semi-finalists were announced after a deliberation stage.

==== Semi-final 1 (25 April) ====
- Guest performance: The Cast of I'm Every Woman - The Chaka Khan Musical ("Ain't Nobody"/"I Feel for You"/"I'm Every Woman")

Semi-finalist	Order	Performance type	Buzzes and judges' votes				Finished
Semi-finalist	Order	Performance type	Cowell	Holden	Dixon	KSI	Finished
Nancy Tilley	1	Drummer					3rd - Eliminated
The Rafikiz	2	Acrobatic Group					5th - Eliminated
Fraser Penman	3	Mentalist					4th - Eliminated
Celtic Beat	4	Dance Group					6th - Eliminated
Anastasiia & Salsa	5	Dog Act					1st (Won Public Vote)
Paul Nunnari	6	Aerialist					7th - Eliminated
Christy Coysh	7	Novelty Singer					2nd - Eliminated
Matty Juniosa	8	Singer		Live Golden Buzzer			Golden Buzzer Advancement

==== Semi-final 2 (2 May) ====
- Guest performance: Sydnie Christmas & The Great Ormond Street Hospital Choir ("You're the Voice")

Semi-finalist	Order	Performance type	Buzzes and judges' votes				Finished
Semi-finalist	Order	Performance type	Cowell	Holden	Dixon	KSI	Finished
World Wings	1	Dance Group					6th - Eliminated
Fabian Fox	2	Magician					1st (Won Public Vote)
Braunstone Community Primary School	3	Choir & Dance Group					5th - Eliminated
Sadeck Berrabah & LMA	4	Dance Group			Live Golden Buzzer		Golden Buzzer Advancement
Katherine O'Malley	5	Singer					7th - Eliminated
Macshane & Delby	6	Freestyle Rap Duo					2nd - Eliminated
Nic Vani	7	Singer					4th - Eliminated
Alfredo & Coral	8	Knife Throwing Duo					3rd - Eliminated

==== Semi-final 3 (9 May) ====
- Guest performances: The Cast of Avenue Q ("For Now"), Westlife ("Swear It Again"/"Flying Without Wings"/"World Of Our Own"/"Uptown Girl")

Semi-finalist	Order	Performance type	Buzzes and judges' votes				Finished
Semi-finalist	Order	Performance type	Cowell	Holden	Dixon	KSI	Finished
Playground	1	Dance Group					5th - Eliminated
The Lux City Choir	2	Choir					6th - Eliminated
Mizuki Shinagawa	3	Aerialist					4th - Eliminated
Mega Unity	4	Dance Group					7th - Eliminated
Niamh Noade	5	Singer & Harpist					2nd - Eliminated
Ted Hill	6	Stand Up Comedian					1st (Won Public Vote)
Liwei Yang	7	Foot Juggler				Live Golden Buzzer	Golden Buzzer Advancement
Antigravity	8	Multimedia Group					3rd - Eliminated

==== Semi-final 4 (16 May) ====
Guest performance: The Cast of Jesus Christ Superstar & Sam Ryder

Semi-finalist	Order	Performance type	Buzzes and judges' votes				Finished
Semi-finalist	Order	Performance type	Cowell	Holden	Dixon	KSI	Finished
Wei Yamin*	1	PVC Pipe Drummer					7th - Eliminated
Welsch Master Team	2	Acrobatic Group					6th - Eliminated
Ren DMC	3	Rapper					2nd - Eliminated
Glantaf Boys Choir	4	Choir					3rd - Eliminated
Sonny Green	5	Poet	Live Golden Buzzer				Golden Buzzer Advancement
Rafferty Coope	6	Magician					1st (Won Public Vote)
Epic Sax Guy^{1}	7	Saxophonist					5th - Eliminated
Kristel Herrera	8	Singer					4th - Eliminated

- ^1 Epic Sax Guy performed with KSI.

* On the ITV2 repeat for 23 May 2026 the first act Wei Yamin was not shown due to a technical difficulty at the beginning.

==== Semi-final 5 (23 May) ====
Guest performance: The Cast of Matilda the Musical "(Revolting Children"/"When I Grow Up)"

Semi-finalist	Order	Performance type	Buzzes and judges' votes				Finished
Semi-finalist	Order	Performance type	Cowell	Holden	Dixon	KSI	Finished
Juan Carlos	1	Dancer					5th - Eliminated
Jake Banfield	2	Magician					2nd - Eliminated
Mr Cherry	3	Novelty Act	^{2}				6th - Eliminated
James Miller	4	Singer					3rd - Eliminated
SOS	5	Band					4th - Eliminated
Celestial	6	Drone Display Group	Live Golden Buzzer	Live Golden Buzzer	Live Golden Buzzer	Live Golden Buzzer	Golden Buzzer Advancement
Baron & Vesper	7	Sideshow Duo					7th - Eliminated
The Hawkstone Farmers Choir	8	Choir					1st (Won Public Vote)

- ^2 Although Mr Cherry pressed Cowell's buzzer as part of his act, Cowell indicated that he would have done so himself regardless of this.

==== Final (30 May) ====
Guest performance: The Cast of Sinatra: The Musical, Mis-Teeq ("One Night Stand"/"All I Want"/"Scandalous")

Finalist	Order	Performance type	Percentage	Finished
Liwei Yang	1	Foot Juggler	2.88%	10th
Rafferty Coope	2	Magician	9.01%	5th
Anastasiia & Salsa	3	Dog Act	9.28%	3rd
The Hawkstone Farmers Choir	4	Choir	28.72%	1st
Fabian Fox	5	Magician	4.34%	9th
Sonny Green	6	Poet	8.66%	6th
Sadeck Berrabah & LMA	7	Dance Group	6.73%	8th
Ted Hill	8	Stand Up Comedian	7.88%	7th
Celestial	9	Drone Display Group	13.36%	2nd
Matty Juniosa	10	Singer	9.16%	4th

== Ratings ==
Episode	Air date	Total viewers (millions)	ITV weekly rank
Auditions 1	21 February	4.70	1
Auditions 2	28 February	4.88	1
Auditions 3	7 March	5.17	1
Auditions 4	21 March	5.08	1
Auditions 5	28 March	5.38	1
Auditions 6	4 April	5.28	1
Auditions 7	11 April	4.55	1
Auditions 8	18 April	4.33	1
Semi-Final 1	25 April	3.77	7
Semi-Final 2	2 May	3.72	7
Semi-Final 3	9 May	3.76	7
Semi-Final 4	16 May	3.44	8
Semi-Final 5	23 May	3.20	9
Final	30 May	4.37	1
