= B Positive Choir =

British choir formed to raise awareness of sickle cell disease

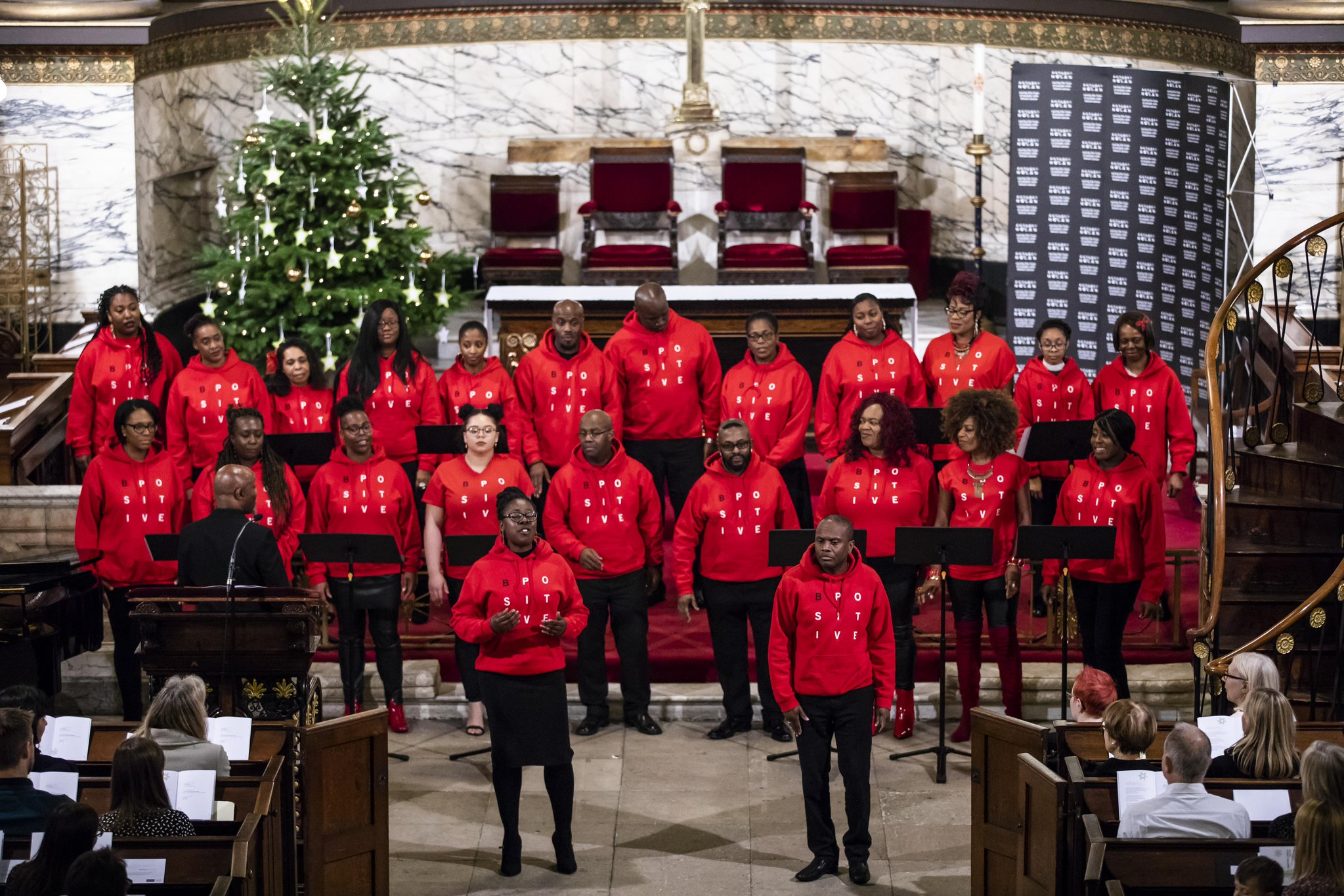
B Positive Choir performing for Anthony Nolan

The B Positive Choir is a British choir. It contains 60 singers who suffer with the sickle cell disease or who have close friends or family suffering from it. The choir is led by Colin Anderson and Lurine Cato and features members from across the UK.

The choir was formed by NHS Blood and Transplant as an initiative to help raise the awareness of the disease as well as attract new donors to give blood, which is essential to treating the disease, particularly amongst black and Asian communities who the NHS feel are under-represented.

The choir performed at the Boisdale of Canary Wharf restaurant as a warm-up show for the 2017 MOBO Awards. They then performed at the awards show proper in Leeds, with gospel artist Lurine Cato on 29 November. MOBO founder Kanya King later said she was happy to support and work with the B Positive Choir and was pleased that their televised performance was popular.

Following the performance, they were invited to perform Christmas songs at St Pancras railway station. They also released a charity single, "Rise Up" in late 2017.

The B Positive Choir starred in the 12th season of Britain's Got Talent. They were selected to appear in the live show, and came in the top three of the second semi-final. Amanda Holden and Alesha Dixon voted for the choir, but Simon Cowell and David Walliams did not. The tie left it up to the audience, and the B Positive Choir were eliminated. However, they were later chosen as the judges' wildcard act, reinstating them into the final. The choir finished in 11th place.

In 2019 the choir performed before members of the royal family at the annual Commonwealth Service at Westminster Abbey.
