= Britain's Got Talent series 8 =

Britain's Got Talent
- Series 8
- Presented by: Ant & Dec (ITV); Stephen Mulhern (ITV2)
- Judges: David Walliams; Alesha Dixon; Amanda Holden; Simon Cowell
- Winner: Collabro
- Runner-up: Lucy Kay

Release
- Original network: ITV; ITV2 (BGMT)
- Original release: 12 April – 7 June 2014

Series chronology
- ← Previous; Series 7 Next → Series 9

Judges and Presenter(s) for Britain's Got Talent Series 8

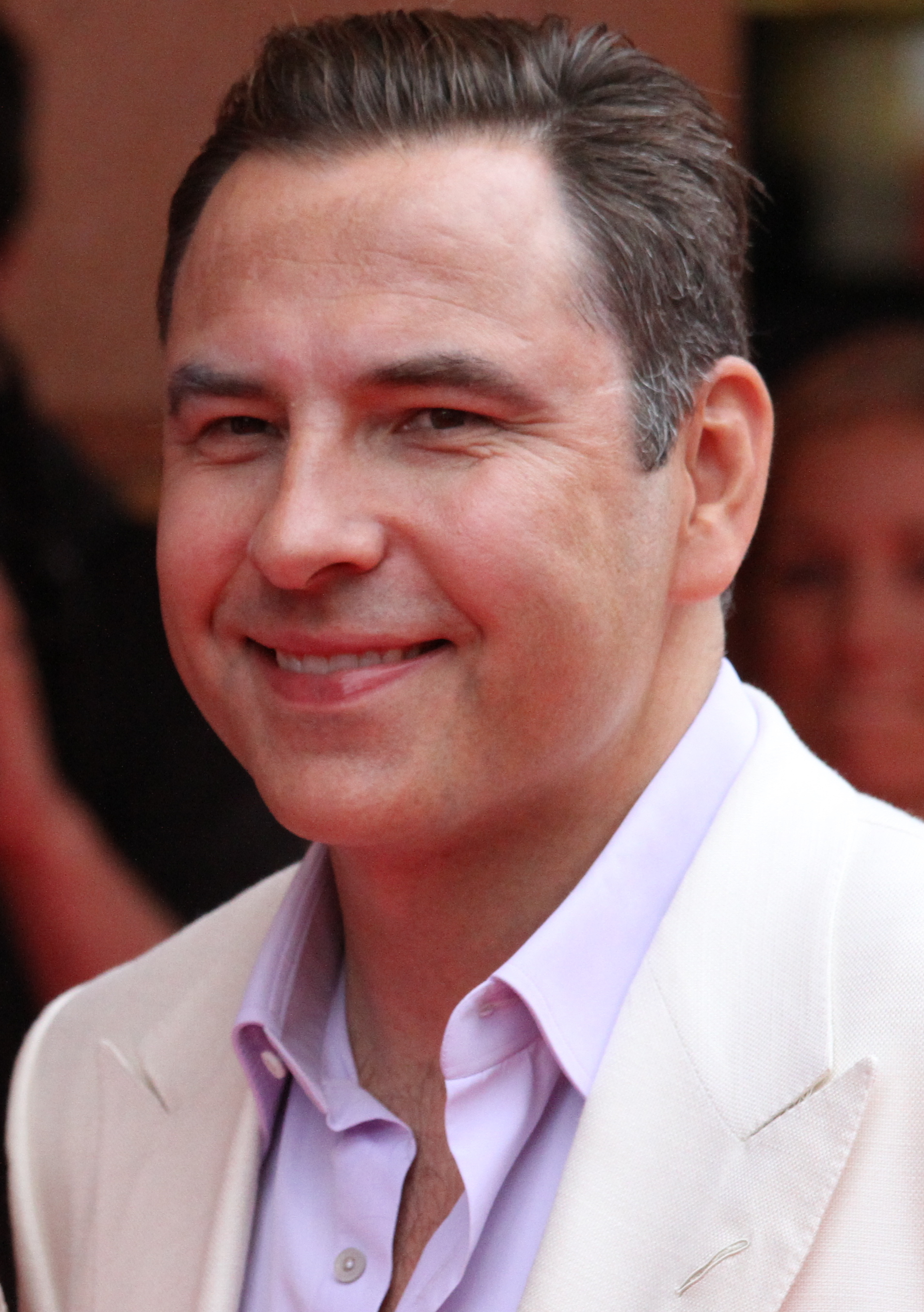
David Walliams

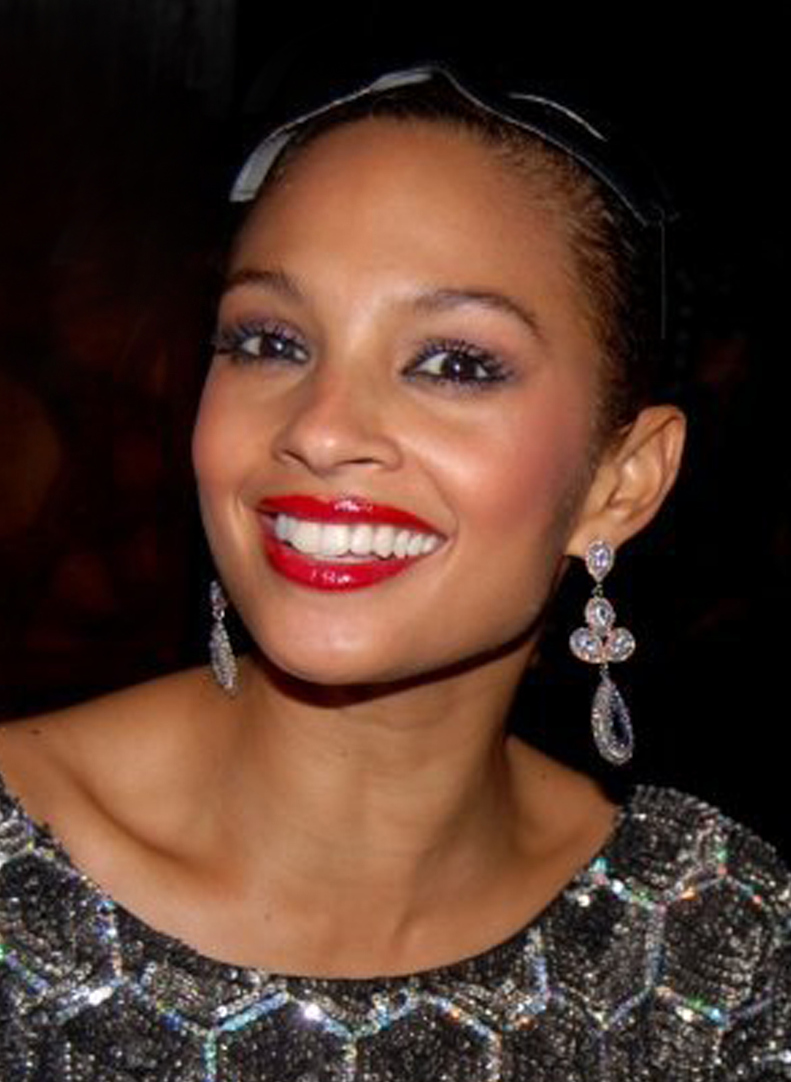
Alesha Dixon

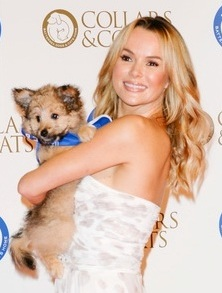
Amanda Holden

Simon Cowell

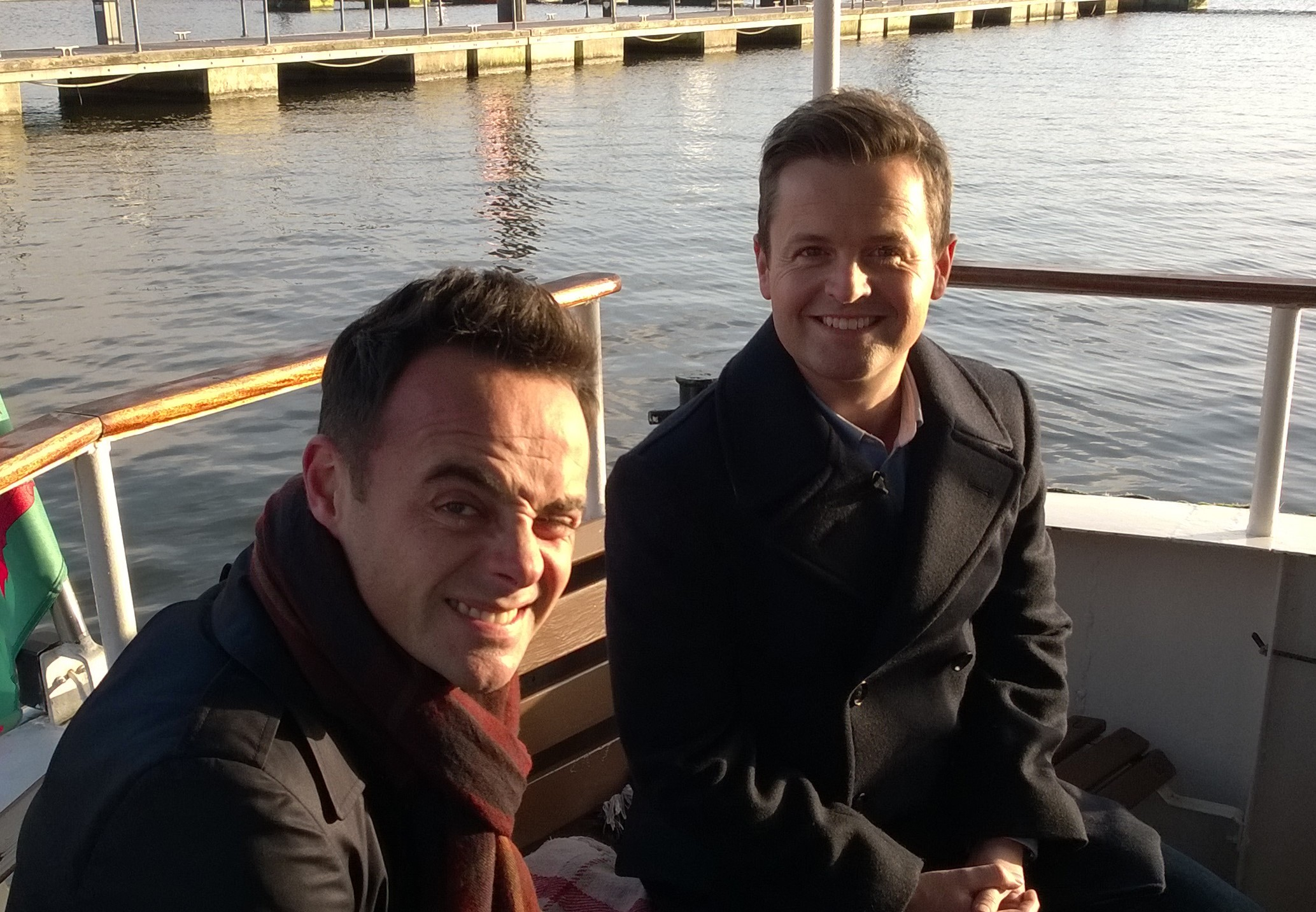
Ant & Dec (ITV1)

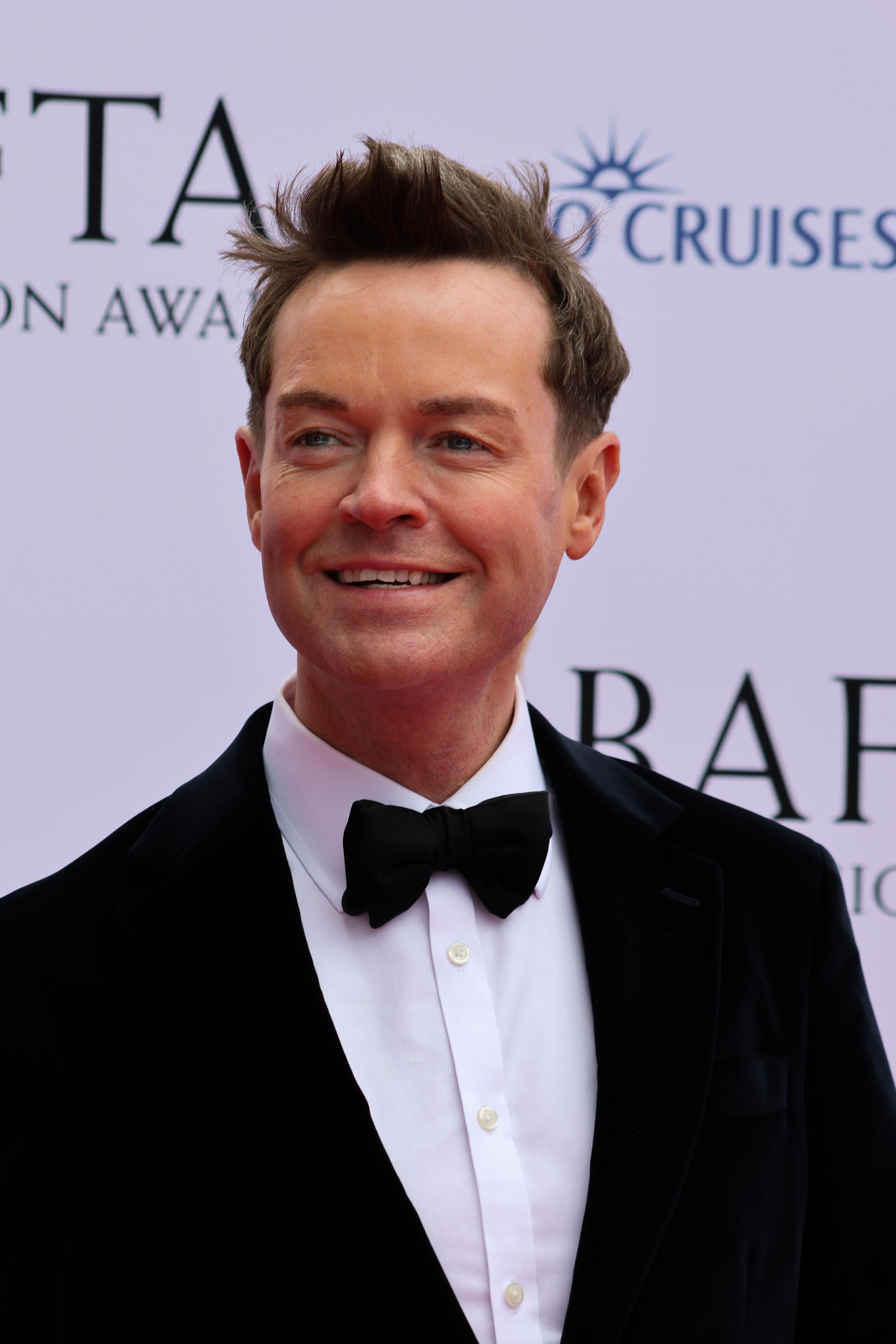
Stephen Mulhern (ITV2)

The eighth series of British talent competition programme Britain's Got Talent was broadcast on ITV, from 12 April to 7 June 2014; because of England's international friendly with Peru, the show took a break on 30 May to avoid clashing with live coverage of the match. Auditions were held in Northern Ireland instead of Scotland for this series, with hosts Anthony McPartlin and Declan Donnelly (colloquially known as Ant & Dec) having to stand in for Simon Cowell, after illness forced him to be absent during a day of auditions. This series was the first in the programme's history to introduce the "Golden Buzzer" format to the competition – an element that was being introduced to the Got Talent franchise since it was first introduced on Germany's Got Talent in 2012.

The eighth series was won by boy band Collabro, with opera singer Lucy Kay finishing in second place and singing and rapping duo Bars and Melody third. During its broadcast, the series averaged around 9.8 million viewers.

== Series overview ==
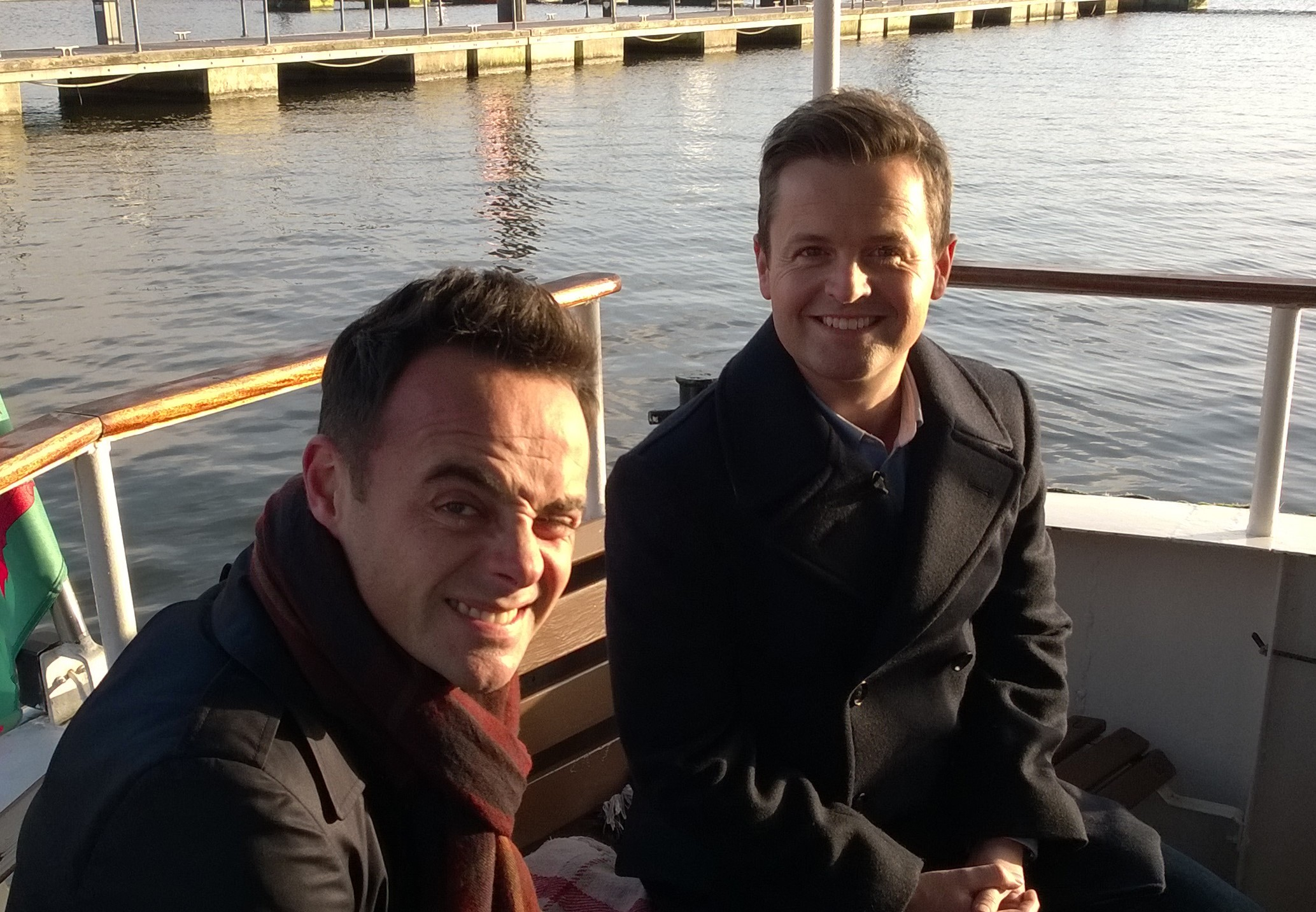
Cowell's absence on a day of auditions, led the hosts to stand in for him

Following open auditions held the previous year between 19 October to 1 December 2013 in various cities, which included auditions held at a series of "Talent Spot tents" provided by the show's sponsor that year, and at The Savoy Hotel in Blackpool and The Old Ship Hotel in Brighton, the Judges' auditions took place between January and February 2014, within Belfast, London, Manchester, Birmingham, and Cardiff. For the first time since the first series, auditions didn't take place in Scotland, as the show's producers wished to try new locations for talent, which led to them opting to hold auditions within Northern Ireland for the first time as a result. Due to illness, Simon Cowell was forced to be absent from a day of auditions in Manchester to recover, leading to hosts Ant & Dec each standing in for him, while on the final day of auditions in London, Cowell was forced to be absent for them to attend to his girlfriend Lauren Silverman, who had gone into labour that day; the show's production team chose not to bring in a stand-in because of this.

By the time that the public auditions for the eighth series' competition had begun, the Got Talent franchise was beginning to update its format for auditions across international editions through the inclusion of a new feature – the "Golden Buzzer". First introduced on Germany's Got Talent, the new format meant that those auditioning for a place in the live rounds of the competition for this year could earn an automatic place in the live rounds from any of the judges or the hosts, regardless of the opinions about their performance. Although the judges and hosts had permission to use the buzzer, Stephen Mulhern was not allowed to use it, despite his involvement in overseeing auditions for Britain's Got More Talent. Also for the first time, the contestants were no longer required to wear an ID sticker during their auditions.

Of the participants that took part, forty-five made it past this stage and into the five live semi-finals- amongst these, salsa dancing duo Paddy & Nico, hip hop duo Bars & Melody, singer Christian Spridon, girl group REAformed, and stand-up comedian/impressionist Toju, each received a golden buzzer during their auditions (by Holden, Cowell, Walliams, Dixon and Ant & Dec respectively) – with nine appearing in each one, and eleven of these acts making it into the live final; the wildcard act chosen by the judges was impressionist Jon Clegg, after he lost out in the tied Judges' vote in the first semi-final. The following below lists the results of each participant's overall performance in this series:

Winner | Runner-up | Finalist | Semi-finalist
Judges' Wildcard Finalist | Golden Buzzer Audition

Participant	Age(s) ^{1}	Genre	Performance Type	Semi-final	Result
Allan Turner-Ward	37	Music	DJ	4	Eliminated
Andrew Derbyshire	31	Singing	Singer	5	Eliminated
Bailey McConnell	15	Singing / Music	Singer & Guitarist	5	Eliminated
Bars & Melody	13 & 15	Singing	Rapper & Singer	4	Third Place
BoldDog FMX Team	24–48	Danger	Motorbike Stunt Team	2	Eliminated
Brian Chan	25	Variety	Painter	3	Eliminated
Cartel	16–27	Dance	Dance Group	3	Eliminated
Christian Spridon	36	Singing	Singer	1	Eliminated
Collabro	20–24	Singing	Musical Theatre Vocal Group	1	Winner
Country Vive	16–35	Dance	Country Dance Group	1	Eliminated
Crazy Rouge	21–26	Dance	Burlesque Dance Group	3	Eliminated
Darcy Oake	26	Magic	Illusionist	1	Finalist
Ed Drewett	26	Singing	Singer	2	Eliminated
Ellis Chick	12	Singing	Singer	3	Eliminated
Eva Iglesias	40	Singing	Singer	4	Eliminated
Henrietta Adewole	18	Singing	Singer	1	Eliminated
Innova Irish Dance Company	14–23	Dance	Irish Dance Group	4	Eliminated
Jack Pack	24–33	Singing	Jazz Vocal Group	5	Finalist
James Smith	15	Singing / Music	Singer & Guitarist	2	Finalist
Jenson Zhu	37	Comedy	Impressionist	5	Eliminated
Jodi Bird	16	Singing	Musical Theatre Singer	2	Eliminated
Jon Clegg	43	Comedy	Impressionist	1	Finalist
Kieran & Sarah	26 & 28	Singing	Opera Singing Duo	4	Eliminated
Kieran Lai	17	Dance	Bodypopper	5	Eliminated
Kings & Queens	18–29	Dance	Latin Dance Group	5	Eliminated
Kitty & Rosie	25 & 48	Singing	Singing Duo	3	Eliminated
Kony Puppets	32	Comedy	Puppeteer	2	Eliminated
La Voix & The London Gay Big Band	26–52	Singing / Music	Drag Singer & Orchestra	5	Eliminated
Lauren & Terrell	12 & 12	Dance	Street Dance Duo	1	Eliminated
Lettice Rowbotham	24	Music	Violinist	4	Finalist
Light Balance	19–33	Dance	Electronic Dance Group	4	Eliminated
Lucy Kay	24	Singing	Opera Singer	3	Runner-Up
Micky Dumoulin	25	Singing	Singer	1	Eliminated
Mini Moves	11–12	Dance	Dance Group	2	Eliminated
Paddy & Nico	79 & 39	Dance	Salsa Dance Duo	5	Finalist
Patsy May ^{2}	44	Singing	Singing Puppet	1	Eliminated
Peat Loaf & Elaine	52 & 36	Singing	Meat Loaf Singing Duo	5	Eliminated
Pyroterra	19–26	Dance / Danger	Fire Dance Group	4	Eliminated
Reaformed	16–21	Singing	Girl Band	3	Eliminated
Ricky K	33	Comedy	Mime	2	Eliminated
Sam Jones	21	Comedy	Ventriloquist	3	Eliminated
SweetChix	14–15	Singing	Girl Band	2	Eliminated
The Addict Initiative	17–31	Dance	Dance Group	2	Finalist
Toju	40	Comedy	Stand Up Comedian	4	Eliminated
Yanis Marshall, Arnaud & Mehdi	24–26	Dance	Dance Trio	3	Finalist

- ^1 Ages denoted for a participant(s), pertain to their final performance for this series.
- ^2 No information on the puppeteer for this act was disclosed by the show.

=== Semi-finals summary ===
Buzzed out | Judges' vote | Won the public vote
Won the judges' vote | Lost the judges' vote | Eliminated

==== Semi-final 1 (26 May) ====
- Guest performance: Ella Henderson ("Ghost")

Semi-Finalist	Order	Performance Type	Buzzes and Judges' Vote				Percentage	Result
Semi-Finalist	Order	Performance Type	Cowell	Holden	Dixon	Walliams	Percentage	Result
Country Vive	1	Country Dance Group					4.0%	4th – Eliminated
Micky Dumoulin	2	Singer					3.0%	5th – Eliminated
Lauren & Terrell	3	Street Dance Duo					2.8%	6th – Eliminated
Patsy May	4	Singing Puppet					1.3%	7th – Eliminated
Henrietta Adewole	5	Singer					0.8%	9th – Eliminated
Jon Clegg ^{3}	6	Impressionist					9.4%	3rd (Judges' vote tied – Lost on Public vote)
Darcy Oake	7	Illusionist					15.5%	2nd (Judges' vote tied – Won on Public vote)
Christian Spridon	8	Singer					0.9%	8th – Eliminated
Collabro	9	Musical Theatre Vocal Group					62.3%	1st (Won Public Vote)

- ^3 Jon Clegg was later sent through to the final as the judges wildcard.

==== Semi-final 2 (27 May) ====
- Guest performance: Ed Sheeran ("Sing")

Semi-Finalist	Order	Performance Type	Buzzes and Judges' Vote				Percentage	Result
Semi-Finalist	Order	Performance Type	Cowell	Holden	Dixon	Walliams	Percentage	Result
Mini Moves	1	Dance Group					7.3%	4th – Eliminated
Ed Drewett	2	Singer					7.0%	5th – Eliminated
BoldDog FMX Team ^{4}	3	Motorbike Stunt Team					6.4%	6th – Eliminated
Jodi Bird	4	Musical Theatre Singer					16.5%	2nd (Lost Judges' vote)
SweetChix	5	Girl Band					5.5%	7th – Eliminated
Ricky K	6	Mime					4.1%	8th – Eliminated
The Addict Initiative	7	Dance Troupe					11.4%	3rd (Won Judges' vote)
Kony Puppets	8	Puppeteer					0.5%	9th – Eliminated
James Smith	9	Singer & Guitarist					41.3%	1st (Won Public vote)

- ^4 For health and safety reasons, Bolddog FMX Team's performance was pre-recorded outside the studio in advance.

==== Semi-final 3 (28 May) ====
- Guest performance: The Vamps ("Last Night")

Semi-Finalist	Order	Performance Type	Buzzes and Judges' Vote				Percentage	Result
Semi-Finalist	Order	Performance Type	Cowell	Holden	Dixon	Walliams	Percentage	Result
Crazy Rouge	1	Burlesque Dance Group					1.9%	7th – Eliminated
Ellis Chick	2	Singer					9.7%	4th – Eliminated
Sam Jones	3	Ventriloquist					2.4%	6th – Eliminated
Reaformed	4	Girl Band					5.2%	5th – Eliminated
Brian Chan	5	Artist					0.5%	9th – Eliminated
Cartel	6	Hip Hop Dance Group					11.5%	3rd (Judges' vote tied – Lost on Public vote)
Kitty & Rosie	7	Singing Duo					1.5%	8th – Eliminated
Lucy Kay	8	Opera Singer					45.8%	1st (Won Public Vote)
Yanis Marshall, Arnaud & Mehdi	9	Dance Trio					21.5%	2nd (Judges' vote tied – Won on Public vote)

==== Semi-final 4 (29 May) ====
- Guest performance: will.i.am & Cody Wise ("It's My Birthday")

Semi-Finalist	Order	Performance Type	Buzzes and Judges' Vote				Percentage	Result
Semi-Finalist	Order	Performance Type	Cowell	Holden	Dixon	Walliams	Percentage	Result
Innova Irish Dance Company	1	Irish Dance Group					13.8%	3rd (Judges' vote tied – Lost on Public vote)
Kieran & Sarah	2	Opera Singing Duo					1.5%	7th – Eliminated
Pyroterra	3	Fire Dance Group					0.7%	8th – Eliminated
Toju	4	Stand Up Comedian					1.9%	6th – Eliminated
Eva Iglesias	5	Singer					5.6%	5th – Eliminated
Allan Turner-Ward	6	DJ					0.5%	9th – Eliminated
Light Balance	7	Electronic Dance Troupe					11.7%	4th – Eliminated
Bars & Melody	8	Rapper & Singer					47.5%	1st (Won Public Vote)
Lettice Rowbotham	9	Violinist					16.8%	2nd (Judges' vote tied – Won on Public vote)

==== Semi-final 5 (31 May) ====
- Guest performance: Attraction & Richard & Adam

Semi-Finalist	Order	Performance Type	Buzzes and Judges' Vote				Percentage	Result
Semi-Finalist	Order	Performance Type	Cowell	Holden	Dixon	Walliams	Percentage	Result
La Voix & The London Gay Big Band	1	Drag Singer & Orchestra					3.3%	6th – Eliminated
Bailey McConnell	2	Singer & Guitarist					12.4%	3rd (Lost Judges' vote)
Kings & Queens	3	Latin Dance Group					3.5%	5th – Eliminated
Peat Loaf & Elaine	4	Meat Loaf Singing Duo					1.5%	9th – Eliminated
Andrew Derbyshire	5	Singer					2.3%	7th – Eliminated
Jenson Zhu	6	Impressionist					4.1%	4th – Eliminated
Kieran Lai	7	Bodypopper					2.0%	8th – Eliminated
Paddy & Nico ^{5}	8	Salsa Dance Duo					13.9%	2nd (Won Judges' vote)
Jack Pack	9	Jazz Vocal Group					57.0%	1st (Won Public vote)

- ^5 Paddy & Nico's performance had to be slightly modified before the semi-final, after the former was injured before its broadcast.

=== Final (7 June) ===
- Guest performance: Diversity & Little Mix ("Salute") &Cheryl Cole featuring Tinie Tempah ("Crazy Stupid Love")

Winner | Runner-up

Finalist	Order	Performance Type	Percentage	Finished
The Addict Initiative	1	Dance Group	2.4%	10th
Jon Clegg	2	Impressionist	5.2%	7th
Lettice Rowbotham	3	Violinist	4.0%	8th
Yanis Marshall, Arnaud & Mehdi ^{1}	4	Dance Trio	1.0%	11th
Bars & Melody	5	Rapper & Singer	14.3%	3rd
James Smith	6	Singer & Guitarist	6.9%	6th
Jack Pack	7	Jazz Vocal Group	10.6%	4th
Darcy Oake	8	Illusionist	8.5%	5th
Paddy & Nico	9	Salsa Dance Duo	3.6%	9th
Collabro	10	Musical Theatre Vocal Group	26.5%	1st
Lucy Kay	11	Opera Singer	17.0%	2nd

- ^1Cowell buzzed Yanis Marshall, Arnaud and Mehdi, stating that their performance was 'boring and unoriginal'. This marks the only instance in Britain's Got Talent history that a buzzer was used in the live final of the competition.

== Ratings ==
Episode	Date	Total viewers (millions)	Weekly rank	Share (%)
Auditions 1	12 April	12.41	1	45.0
Auditions 2	19 April	11.05	1	40.4
Auditions 3	26 April	11.33	1	42.6
Auditions 4	3 May	10.90	1	42.3
Auditions 5	10 May	11.14	1	41.1
Auditions 6	17 May	10.70	1	40.9
Auditions 7	25 May	9.93	1	38.9
Semi-final 1	26 May	10.94	1	39.1
Semi-final 1 results	26 May	8.87	10	33.3
Semi-final 2	27 May	9.36	8	34.9
Semi-final 2 results	27 May	7.54	14	27.4
Semi-final 3	28 May	9.41	6	36.7
Semi-final 3 results	28 May	7.55	13	28.7
Semi-final 4	29 May	9.53	7	36.7
Semi-final 4 results	29 May	8.39	12	33.3
Semi-final 5	31 May	8.97	11	38.1
Semi-final 5 results	31 May	7.09	19	28.2
Live final	7 June	12.05	1	49.0
