= Paddy Jones =

British salsa dancer (born 1934)

- Born: Sarah Patricia Collier; 1 July 1934 (age 92); Stourbridge, England
- Occupation: Dancer
- Years active: 2009-present
- Known for: Participating in Tú sí que vales, Britain's Got Talent (series 8), Britain's Got Talent: The Champions, America's Got Talent: The Champions (season 2) and more.
- Spouse: David (m. 1956–2003; died due to leukaemia)
- Children: 4

Sarah Patricia Jones (born 1 July 1934) is a British salsa dancer, best known for winning the Spanish talent show Tú sí que vales alongside her dancing partner Nico in 2009. In 2014, Paddy and Nico competed in the eighth series of Britain's Got Talent, where they finished ninth overall.

She is the current Guinness World Record holder for the 'Oldest Acrobatic Salsa Dancer'.

== Early and personal life ==
Paddy was born in Stourbridge, England. She started dancing classical dance when she was 2½ years old and at the age of fifteen began taking classes in more disciplines. However, she left dancing at the age of 22 when she married her husband, David and they had four children. They moved to Gandia, Spain in 2001 when her husband retired, but David died of leukaemia just two years later.

After the death of her husband, Paddy decided to take flamenco classes at Nicolás "Nico" Espinosa's academy of dance, where she learned to dance salsa and formed the salsa dancing duo "Son del Timbal" with Nico (who is 40 years younger than her).

== Career ==
=== Tú sí que vales ===
Paddy & Nico went on to enter the Spanish talent show, Tú sí que vales, eventually winning the show on 2 December 2009. They also won €10,000 and global fame after being compared to Susan Boyle.

=== Split ===
After the international success, the couple competed in Bailando 2010 (the Argentinian version of Dancing with the Stars). Since they were voted off Showmatch (in round 11) the relationship of the couple had been fraught. Nico decided it was time to move on, shutting down the bar he ran in Gandia, Spain, where Paddy lived, and moved away from the area. Nico has since moved back to Gandia and the couple are again performing at Salsa congresses around the world.

=== Britain's Got Talent ===
In 2014, Paddy & Nico auditioned for the eighth series of Britain's Got Talent. Their audition was broadcast on ITV in the UK on 12 April. At the end of the audition, judge Amanda Holden used her Golden Buzzer to send the pair straight through to the semi-finals. Simon Cowell had buzzed the act, but he then apologized saying he buzzed too early. On 29 May, it was reported Paddy & Nico would have to withdraw from the show after Paddy cracked her rib while rehearsing a new routine with Nico, with Amanda Holden expressing her disappointment, "Ever since I first saw Paddy dance, I fell in love with her. ... And I really think she could've won the whole show". However, the following day it was announced that Paddy & Nico would still compete in the show, with Paddy's health having improved since the injury, and she was given the go ahead from doctors. Paddy said she had told the producers of the show that she believed she was "fit enough to dance", commenting "Britain's Got Talent is something I very much want to do." Paddy and Nico were put through to the finals of the show on 31 May, passing the semi-finals with three favourable votes from the judges over singer Bailey McConnell. They performed another routine at the live final on 7 June 2014, coming in ninth overall.

In 2015, they participated under the name "Paddy & Nicko" in the German version of the show: "Das Supertalent". They reached the final on 12 December 2015. They finished in ninth place, out of twelve candidates.

In 2019, Paddy and Nico were invited to compete on Britain's Got Talent: The Champions. They advanced to the finale after receiving a golden buzzer from judge David Walliams. They were eliminated in the finals. In 2020 Paddy and Nico were invited to compete on America's Got Talent: The Champions (season 2). They were also eliminated.

=== La France a un incroyable talent ===
In November 2016, Paddy & Nico auditioned for the French version of Britain's got talent, La France a un incroyable talent. They ended as the semi-finalists and were eliminated before the finale.

=== Teleton Chile 2017 ===
In December 2017, Paddy & Nico were invited to participate on the late-show leg of the 2017 Chilean Teleton.

=== Festival di Sanremo 2018 ===
In February 2018 Paddy was a special guest at the 68th edition of the Sanremo Music Festival in Italy, dancing for three of five evenings on the notes of the song "Una vita in vacanza" by the band Lo Stato Sociale.

=== Got Talent España ===
In October 2021 Paddy and Nicko auditioned for the seventh edition of Got Talent España, getting three yes from the judges, moving to the next stage.

== Shows ==
Year	Show	Role	Result
2009	Tú sí que vales	Contestant	Winner
2010	Bailando por un Sueño (Argentina)	Contestant	Eliminated
2014	Britain's Got Talent (series 8)	Contestant	Finalist
2015	Das Supertalent	Contestant	Finalist
2016	La France a un incroyable talent	Contestant	Semi-Finalist
2017	Teleton Chile	Participant	
2018	Festival di Sanremo	Guest	
2019	Britain's Got Talent: The Champions	Contestant	Finalist
2020	America's Got Talent: The Champions (season 2)	Contestant	Eliminated
2021	Got Talent España	Contestant	Eliminated
