= Myles and Connor =

British musical duo and television presenters

Myles & Connor
- Also known as: The Change (2011–12); Connected (Until 2010)
- Born: 19 October 1995 (age 29); Manchester, England
- Genres: Pop
- Occupation(s): singers, songwriters, television presenters
- Years active: Music 2010–present (currently on hiatus); TV Presenting 2015-2017
- Labels: Playdome; Sony; Syco
- Members: Myles Ryan; Connor Ryan

Myles Antony Ryan and Connor Jerrade Ryan (born 19 October 1995) are a British musical duo and television presenters from Manchester, England who are best known for appearing on the fourth series of ITV's show Britain's Got Talent as part of the boyband 'Connected'.

== History ==
=== 2010: Britain's Got Talent ===
The twins auditioned as 'Connected' on the fourth series of ITV reality show Britain's Got Talent in early 2010, along with Harry & Max Mondryk and Matthew Fitzgerald. For their audition, they sang I Want It That Way by the Backstreet Boys. While they received positive feedback from judges Piers Morgan and Amanda Holden, Simon Cowell criticized the band for looking 'out-dated' and claimed that they shouldn't have tried to impersonate the band. In retaliation to this, the band performed Ain't No Mountain High Enough to win him over. They received three yes votes from the judges. They then found out they went through to the semi-finals.

In the second semi final, the band performed No Boundaries by Kris Allen. They received positive feedback from all three judges, and after landing in the judges vote, they were chosen by Cowell and Morgan to go through to the final.

In the final, the band performed What About Now by Westlife, originally by Daughtry. While they received positive comments from two of the judges, Cowell was yet again to criticize the song choice as he believed that the song didn't make them 'young enough'. They eventually finished outside the Top 3.

After the show, the band performed on the Britain's Got Talent Live Tour, across arenas all over the UK, performing the songs Never Forget by Take That, Everybody in Love by JLS, and Don't Stop Me Now by Queen as part of the finale.

=== 2010–12: Post Talent & Hiatus ===
==== Split from Connected ====
Connected performed their last gig together in Tamworth in front of 20,000 people on 18 July 2010.

On 30 July, Harry, Max and Matt announced on Facebook and their website that they had split with the twins and were forming a new band. The group were scheduled to perform a gig that night. The twins gave their story to the Manchester Evening News, following an article the Mondryks and Fitzgerald had given to the paper a week before.

The twins vowed to continue performing as a duo.

==== Record deal and debut single ====
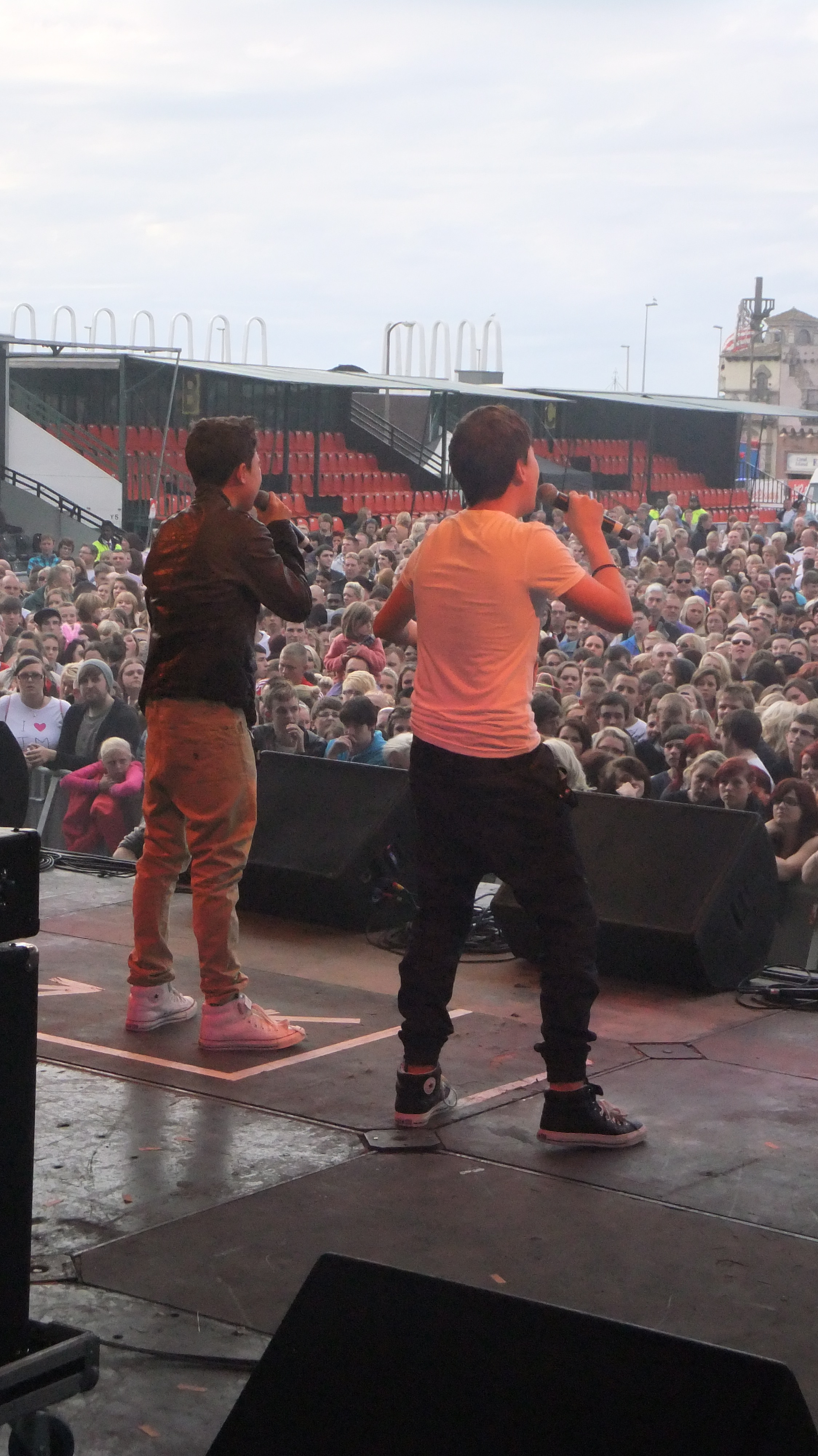
Myles (left) and Connor (right) performing at the Blackpool illuminations 2011

The twins were performing at a social club when a record label scout approached them and invited them to London to discuss their future. They eventually signed a record deal with Playdome Records.

The twins then spent most of early 2011 to help write and produce their debut album with top producer and co writer Marc Fargeot, though plans for the album were eventually put on hold. On 2 September 2011, Myles and Connor performed at the Blackpool Illuminations 2011.

==== The Change and Hiatus ====
On 25 February 2012, the duo revealed they had formed a new band, The Change, focusing more on the pop-rock genre. The group disbanded on 10 June 2012. Myles and Connor continued to perform as a duo, initially as The Change, but later reverting to their original name. Currently, Myles and Connor are on hiatus from live performances, but are continuing to post various covers and original songs on YouTube and Instagram.

=== 2015-2017: Television Presenting ===
Between September 2015 and August 2017, Myles and Connor were a part of local TV station That's Manchester, where they presented the weekly offbeat news programme, Student Speak (alongside regular co-presenters including Kate Troy, Harvey Thorley, Tom Hoy, Alice Keegan and Lauren Johnston). The show ran for 96 episodes.
