= Britain's Got Talent series 18 =

Britain's Got Talent
- Series 18
- Presented by: Ant & Dec
- Judges: Bruno Tonioli; Alesha Dixon; Amanda Holden; Simon Cowell; KSI (guest)
- Winner: Harry Moulding
- Runner-up: The Blackouts

Release
- Original network: ITV
- Original release: 22 February – 31 May 2025

Season chronology
- ← Previous; Series 17 Next → Series 19

The eighteenth series of British talent competition programme Britain's Got Talent was broadcast on ITV from 22 February 2025 and concluded on 31 May 2025; due to live coverage of the final match weekend of the 2025 Six Nations Championship, on 15 March 2025, the fourth audition episode of the series was pushed back by a week. Additionally, due to BBC One and ITV's shared live coverage of the 2025 FA Cup final and BBC One's live coverage of the Eurovision Song Contest 2025 final, on 17 May 2025, the fourth semi-final was pushed back a day to avoid clashes. Auditions took place in Blackpool, between October 2024 and January 2025, rather than London, for the first time in the show's history, with internet personality, boxer and rapper KSI partially replacing Bruno Tonioli, who was unavailable due to his commitments in America with Dancing with the Stars; he also stepped in for Simon Cowell, who stepped down following the death of Liam Payne.

The series is notable for airing in February, rather than April, with the audition episodes filling in the gap in the schedule left by Ant & Dec's Saturday Night Takeaway, which entered indefinite hiatus, following the end of its twentieth series, in April 2024. Additionally, the live semi-finals were aired weekly on Saturday nights (with the exception of the fourth), from 26 April, with the live final airing on 31 May 2025. In previous series, the semi-finals aired over 5 consecutive weeknights, with the final airing on the following Sunday.

The eighteenth series was won by magician Harry Moulding, with dance group The Blackouts as runners-up, and dancer Binita Chetry finishing in third place. Moulding was just the second magic act to win Britain’s Got Talent, joining series 10 winner, Richard Jones. The Blackouts were the first international act to finish as runners-up, and this was also the fourth time in the show's history in which two acts from the same semi-final would place in the Final 3, with the previous time being just 2, during series 16.

Judges and presenters for Britain's Got Talent Series 18

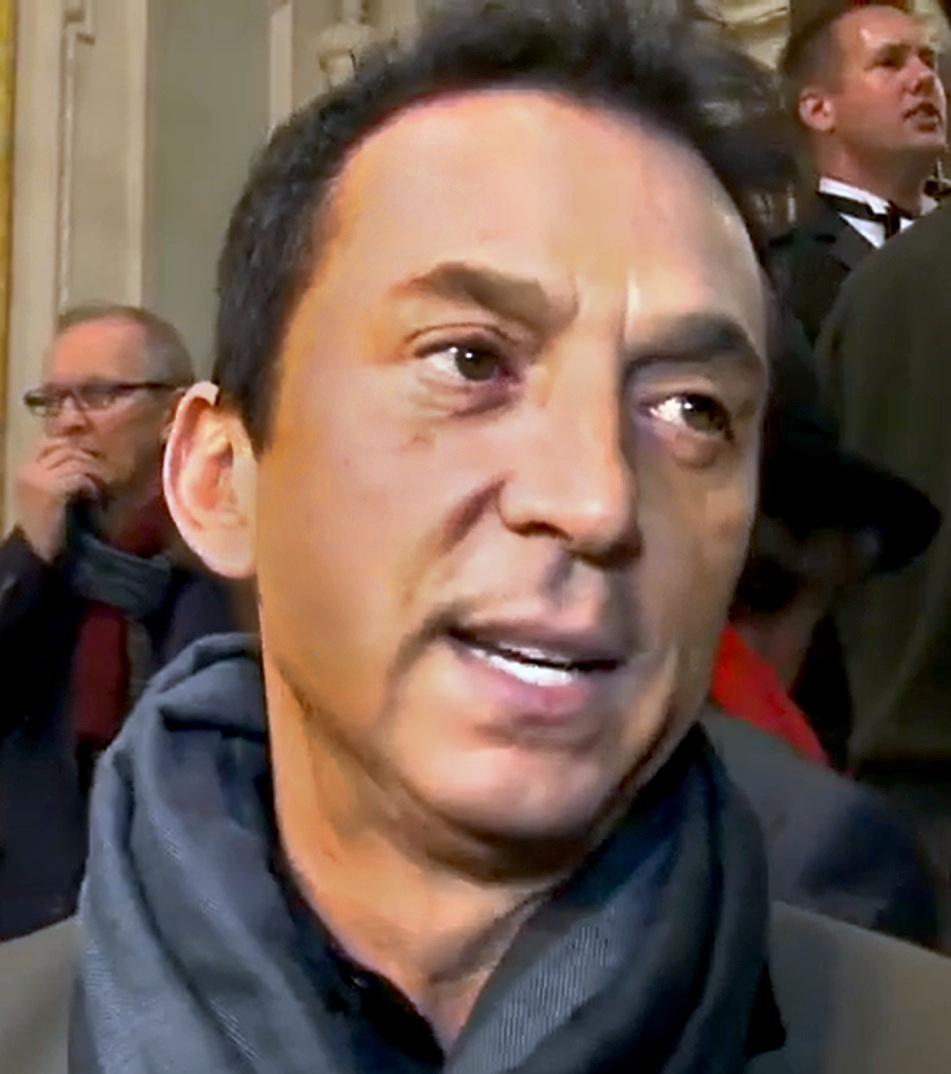
Bruno Tonioli

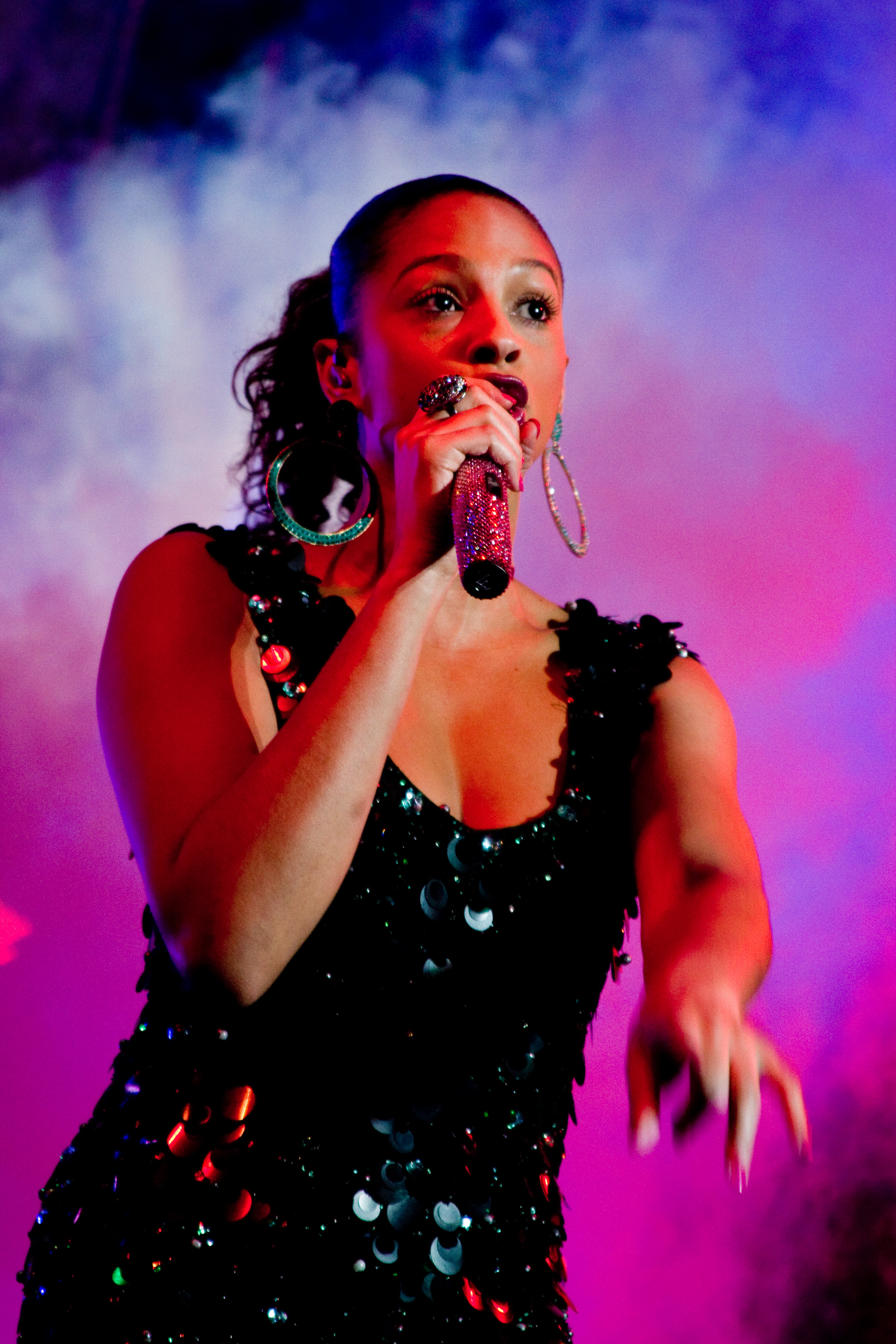
Alesha Dixon

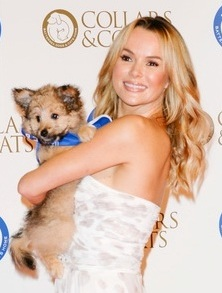
Amanda Holden

Simon Cowell

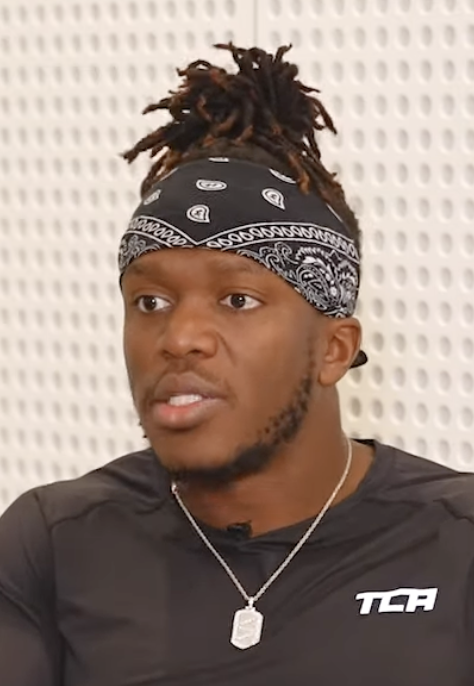
KSI (Guest)

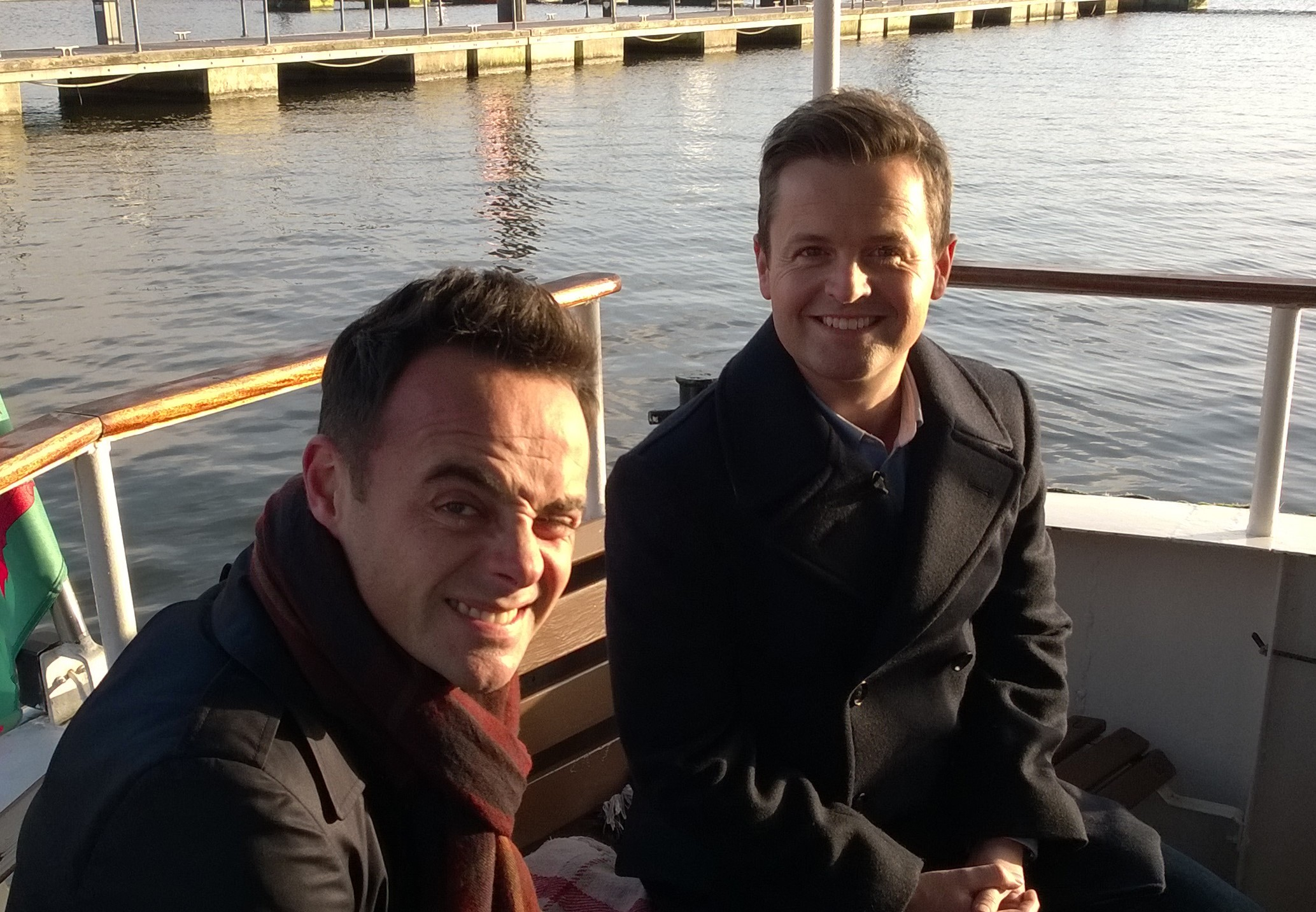
Ant & Dec

== Series overview ==
Following the conclusion of the previous series, it was announced that the show would return for an eighteenth series. It was also confirmed that the judging panel of the prior series would remain the same, with Simon Cowell, Amanda Holden, Alesha Dixon and Bruno Tonioli returning to the show, additionally, guest judge KSI partially replaced Tonioli, who was unavailable due to his commitments in America with Dancing with the Stars, and also stepped in for Cowell, who stepped down following the death of One Direction star Liam Payne. This is the first time in the show's history that it aired in February, instead of April, to fill the gap in the schedule left by Ant & Dec's Saturday Night Takeaway, following the start of its indefinite hiatus, in April 2024.

In November 2024, it was announced that the auditions would be entirely filmed in Blackpool and not in London for the first time in the show's history.

The pre-recorded auditions were broadcast from 22 February to 19 April 2025; due to live coverage of the final match weekend of the 2025 Six Nations Championship, the fourth audition episode of the series was pushed back by a week. The live semi-final shows started airing on a weekly basis, from 26 April to the live final on 31 May 2025. Due to BBC One and ITV's live coverage of the 2025 FA Cup final and BBC One's live coverage of the Eurovision Song Contest 2025 final, on 17 May 2025, the fourth semi-final was pushed back a day to avoid clashes.

On 16 April 2025, it was announced that each of the judges and the hosts, Ant & Dec, were permitted to one Golden Buzzer each in the live shows with one pressed every episode to advance an act onto the final with the other Finalist on a weekly basis being determined by the act who won the Public Vote. However, during the last semi final, on 24 May 2025, Ant & Dec announced that they would instead allow KSI, who served as a guest judge once more during the show, to use their Live Show Golden Buzzer.

Winner
Runner-Up
Third Place
Semi-Finalist
Wildcard
Golden Buzzer
Live Show Golden Buzzer

Participant	Age	Genre	Performance type	From	Semi-final	Finished
Akira	50	Variety	Novelty Act	Tokyo, Japan	1	Eliminated
Albert Amores	18	Acrobatics	Aerialist	Spain	3	Eliminated
Alexandra Burgio	34	Magic	Magician	Canada	2	Eliminated
Auzzy Blood	29	Danger	Sideshow Performer	Las Vegas, US	1	Eliminated
Bao Cuong	45	Danger	Danger Act	Vietnam	3	Eliminated
Binita Chetry	8	Dance	Dancer	Assam, India	5	Third place
Cheer Re Man’s	22-31	Acrobatics / Dance	Cheerleading Group	Tokyo, Japan	2	Eliminated
CJ Emmons	43	Singing	Singer	Los Angeles, California	5	Eliminated
Eden Choi	24	Magic	Magician	South Korea	1	Eliminated
Electric Umbrella	5-66	Singing	Choir	Watford, Hertfordshire	3	Eliminated
Han & Fran	35 & 36	Singing	Vocal Duo	Llandudno, Conwy, North Wales	5	Finalist
Harry & Lewis	27	Dance	Dance Duo	Liverpool & Manchester	3	Eliminated
Harry Moulding	24	Magic	Magician	Blackpool, Lancashire	5	Winner
Hear Our Voice	17-76	Singing	Choir	Various	4	Finalist
Heavysaurus	—N/a	Singing / Music	Band	Germany	1	Eliminated
IDOLLS ^{1}	18-32	Dance	Dance Group	Japan	4	Eliminated
Jannick Holste	22	Magic / Dance	Magician & Dancer	Germany	2	Eliminated
Jasmine Rice	36	Singing	Opera Singer	New York, US	3	Finalist
Jerry Pop	12	Dance	Dancer	Manchester	5	Eliminated
John Pierce	42	Singing	Singer	Essex	2	Eliminated
Joseph Charm	32	Comedy	Stand Up Comedian	Milton Keynes, Buckinghamshire	4	Finalist
Lazy Generation	28-36	Danger	Stunt Group	London	5	Eliminated
Lil M’s	5-10	Dance	Dance Group	Port Talbot, Wales	2	Eliminated
Linda Mudzenda	21	Singing	Singer	Zimbabwe	1	Eliminated
Manho Han	33	Magic	Magician	South Korea	5	Eliminated
Max Fox	35	Singing	Singer	Blackpool, Lancashire	4	Eliminated
Maya Giotea	14	Singing	Singer	Romania	4	Eliminated
Mickey Callisto	28	Singing	Singer	Sunderland, Tyne and Wear	3	Eliminated
Obsequious	19-33	Dance	Dance Group	Manila, Philippines	4	Eliminated
Olly Pearson	11	Music	Guitarist	Wrexham, Wales	2	Finalist
Papi Bucket	39	Music	Rubber Chicken Musician	Taiwan	4	Eliminated
Ping Pong Pang	15-37	Dance	Dance Group	Italy	3	Finalist
Red Panda	54	Acrobatics	Unicyclist	China	5	Eliminated
RuMac	32	Singing / Music	Singer & Accordionist	Ullapool, Scotland	3	Eliminated
Stacey Leadbeatter	29	Singing	Singer	Yorkshire	2	Finalist
Teddy Magic	8	Magic	Close Up Magician	Kent	1	Withdrew
The Blackouts	18-42	Dance	LED Dance Group	Switzerland	1	Runner-up
TK Magic	28	Magic	Magician	Dagenham, East London	4	Eliminated
Vinnie McKee	29	Singing	Singer	Glasgow, Scotland	1	Finalist
Will Burns	24	Comedy	Impressionist	Leeds, West Yorkshire	2	Eliminated

- ^1 IDOLLS previously reached the Semi-Finals of Series 13 under the name Fabulous Sisters.

=== Semi-finals summary ===
Buzzed out
Golden Buzzer
Won the Public Vote
2nd in Public Vote
3rd in Public Vote
Eliminated

Prior to the beginning of the live shows, the semi-finalists were decided following a deliberation stage.

==== Semi-final 1 (26 April) ====
- Guest performance: The Cast of Tina - The Tina Turner Musical

Semi-Finalist	Order	Performance type	Buzzes and judges' votes				Percentage	Finished
Semi-Finalist	Order	Performance type	Cowell	Holden	Dixon	Tonioli	Percentage	Finished
Heavysaurus	1	Band					3.9%	6th - Eliminated
Vinnie McKee	2	Singer					28.6%	1st (Won Public Vote)
The Blackouts	3	LED Dance Group		Live Golden Buzzer			N/A	Golden Buzzer Advancement
Akira	4	Novelty Act					17.5%	4th - Eliminated
Linda Mudzenda	5	Singer					23.0%	2nd - Eliminated
Auzzy Blood	6	Sideshow Performer					7.0%	5th - Eliminated
Eden Choi	7	Magician					20.0%	3rd - Eliminated
Teddy Magic ^{2}	N/A	Close Up Magician					Withdrew	

^2Teddy Magic was scheduled to perform second, however he pulled out of performing before withdrawing from the show on 15th May, hopefully returns in a future series by the producers.

==== Semi-final 2 (3 May) ====
- Guest performance: The Cast of Disney's Hercules

Semi-Finalist	Order	Performance type	Buzzes and judges' votes				Percentage	Finished
Semi-Finalist	Order	Performance type	Cowell	Holden	Dixon	Tonioli	Percentage	Finished
Lil M’s	1	Dance Group					10.4%	5th - Eliminated
John Pierce	2	Singer					8.4%	7th - Eliminated
Alexandra Burgio	3	Magician					12.3%	4th - Eliminated
Olly Pearson	4	Guitarist	Live Golden Buzzer				N/A	Golden Buzzer Advancement
Jannick Holste	5	Magician & Dancer					10.2%	6th - Eliminated
Will Burns	6	Impressionist	^{3}				17.8%	2nd - Eliminated
Cheer Re Man’s	7	Cheerleading Group					16.0%	3rd - Eliminated
Stacey Leadbeatter	8	Singer					24.9%	1st (Won Public Vote)

^3Will Burns buzzed himself with Cowell's buzzer as part of his act.

==== Semi-final 3 (10 May) ====
- Guest performance: The Cast of Just For One Day, Sydnie Christmas & Loren Allred

Semi-Finalist	Order	Performance type	Buzzes and judges' votes				Percentage	Finished
Semi-Finalist	Order	Performance type	Cowell	Holden	Dixon	Tonioli	Percentage	Finished
Harry & Lewis	1	Dance Duo					8.5%	5th - Eliminated
Albert Amores	2	Aerialist					12.5%	3rd - Eliminated
Mickey Callisto	3	Singer					11.2%	4th - Eliminated
Jasmine Rice	4	Opera Singer				Live Golden Buzzer	N/A	Golden Buzzer Advancement
RuMac	5	Singer & Accordionist					7.4%	6th - Eliminated
Ping Pong Pang	6	Dance Group					28.1%	1st (Won Public Vote)
Bao Cuong	7	Danger Act					4.8%	7th - Eliminated
Electric Umbrella	8	Choir					27.5%	2nd - Eliminated

==== Semi-final 4 (18 May) ====
- Guest performance: The Cast of Come Alive! The Greatest Showman Circus Spectacular, The Cast of Oliver!

Semi-Finalist	Order	Performance type	Buzzes and judges' votes				Percentage	Finished
Semi-Finalist	Order	Performance type	Cowell	Holden	Dixon	Tonioli	Percentage	Finished
IDOLLS	1	Dance Group					12.7%	5th - Eliminated
Papi Bucket	2	Rubber Chicken Musician					2.8%	7th - Eliminated
Max Fox	3	Singer					19.1%	2nd - Eliminated
TK Magic	4	Magician					18.9%	3rd - Eliminated
Maya Giotea	5	Singer					13.6%	4th - Eliminated
Joseph Charm	6	Stand Up Comedian			Live Golden Buzzer		N/A	Golden Buzzer Advancement
Obsequious	7	Dance Group					9.8%	6th - Eliminated
Hear Our Voice	8	Choir					23.1%	1st (Won Public Vote)

==== Semi-final 5 (24 May) ====
- Guest performance: Here & Now - The Steps Musical & Steps, Diversity

Semi-Finalist	Order	Performance type	Buzzes and judges' votes					Percentage	Finished
Semi-Finalist	Order	Performance type	Cowell	Holden	KSI	Dixon	Tonioli	Percentage	Finished
Jerry Pop	1	Dancer						4.5%	7th - Eliminated
CJ Emmons	2	Singer						17.6%	3rd - Eliminated
Harry Moulding	3	Magician			Live Golden Buzzer			N/A	Golden Buzzer Advancement
Binita Chetry	4	Dancer						25.9%	1st (Won Public Vote)
Red Panda	5	Unicyclist						4.8%	6th - Eliminated
Lazy Generation	6	Stunt Group			^{4}			13.9%	4th - Eliminated
Manho Han	7	Magician						11.7%	5th - Eliminated
Han & Fran	8	Singing Duo						21.6%	2nd - Eliminated

^4 Although he did not have a buzzer himself, KSI pressed Dixon's buzzer at the end of the performance to mark his disapproval of the act.

^5 Han & Fran were later sent through as the judges’ wildcard.

=== Final (31 May) ===
• Guest Performance: KSI & Tom Grennan

Winner | Runner-up | Third place

Finalist	Order	Performance type	Percentage	Finished
Han & Fran	1	Singing Duo	3.6%	9th
Ping Pong Pang	2	Dance Group	3.1%	10th
Stacey Leadbeatter	3	Singer	2.8%	11th
Hear Our Voice	4	Choir	7.0%	7th
Joseph Charm	5	Stand Up Comedian	9.3%	5th
Vinnie McKee	6	Singer	4.7%	8th
Jasmine Rice	7	Opera Singer	9.1%	6th
Binita Chetry	8	Dancer	13.2%	3rd
The Blackouts	9	Electronic Dance Group	15.1%	2nd
Harry Moulding	10	Magician	21.7%	1st
Olly Pearson	11	Guitarist	10.4%	4th

== Ratings ==
Episode	Air date	Total viewers (millions)	ITV Weekly rank
Auditions 1	22 February	6.85	1
Auditions 2	1 March	6.21	2
Auditions 3	8 March	6.34	1
Auditions 4	22 March	6.12	1
Auditions 5	29 March	5.86	3
Auditions 6	5 April	5.51	2
Auditions 7	12 April	5.79	1
Auditions 8	19 April	5.53	1
Semi-Final 1	26 April	5.11	1
Semi-Final 2	3 May	4.87	1
Semi-Final 3	10 May	4.87	1
Semi-Final 4	18 May	4.30	2
Semi-Final 5	24 May	4.92	1
Final	31 May	5.29	1
