= Steve Hewlett (ventriloquist) =

British ventriloquist

Steve Hewlett is a ventriloquist from Basingstoke, Hampshire, England. He was a finalist on the seventh series of Britain's Got Talent.

== Early career ==
Hewlett has previously headlined Cromer Pier.

== Britain's Got Talent ==
He auditioned with a puppet called 'Arthur Lager', depicted as an old man with grey hair. Hewlett's audition was aired in a montage on 18 May 2013. He made it through, and subsequently through to the semi-finals. He appeared again in the semi-final on 1 June with Arthur Lager, and a puppet designed to resemble Simon Cowell, one of the judges. The routine involved Arthur flirting with Amanda Holden. He finished in the top three, and with eventual winners Attraction already through to the final, it was down to the judges to choose the second place in the final between Hewlett and Jordan O'Keefe. It was a split decision, so it was referred back to the public vote, revealing that with 15.1% of the vote, O'Keefe was through to the final, compared to Hewlett's 12%. This left six singing acts in the final, which generated complaints; Holden defended this, and the number of singers on the show, saying "We left it to the public, they wanted Jordan so that was the right decision. You can't argue with the public's decision."

However, earlier in the week, it was revealed that the judges were going to choose a wildcard act out of the third-placed finishers to compete in the final. Hewlett was seen as the popular choice. It was revealed on the night that Hewlett was indeed the wildcard. He performed again in the final with Arthur Lager (now wearing a Onesie) and the puppet of Simon Cowell (wearing a swimsuit and life jacket), as well as a puppet of Sinitta, along with a musical number in the shape of "We Go Together" from Grease at the end, involving the Simon and Sinitta puppets. Despite rave reviews from the judges, Hewlett finished fourth, just narrowly missing out on the top three with 14.7% of the vote, compared to Richard & Adam's 15.4%.

== Later career ==
It was revealed the day after the final that Hewlett had been signed to entertainment agency ROAR Global. In 2014, Hewlett led a team of challengers on the TV quiz show Eggheads. He took puppet Arthur Lager with him. Going Solo In 2016 Steve appeared as a guest on BBC's Strictly Come Dancing reading Terms & Conditions with his new sidekick Rod Vegas.

Also in 2016 Hewlett supported Kenny G on his UK tour in Manchester, Birmingham ending at London's Royal Albert Hall which was followed by touring America & England in the Andy Williams Christmas Extravaganza with The Osmonds.

== Personal life ==
He lives with his wife Nina and their two daughters.
