= NSUT =

NSUT may refer to:

- Merited Artist of Vietnam (Nghệ sĩ ưu tú), an honorary title used in Vietnam
- Netaji Subhash University of Technology, a university in Delhi, India
