= Britain's Got Talent series 13 =

British talent competition series

Britain's Got Talent
- Series 13
- Presented by: Ant & Dec (ITV); Stephen Mulhern (ITV2)
- Judges: David Walliams; Alesha Dixon; Amanda Holden; Simon Cowell
- Winner: Colin Thackery
- Runner-up: X (Marc Spelmann)

Release
- Original network: ITV; ITV2 (BGMT)
- Original release: 6 April – 2 June 2019

Series chronology
- ← Previous; Series 12 Next → Series 14

Judges and Presenter(s) for Britain's Got Talent Series 13

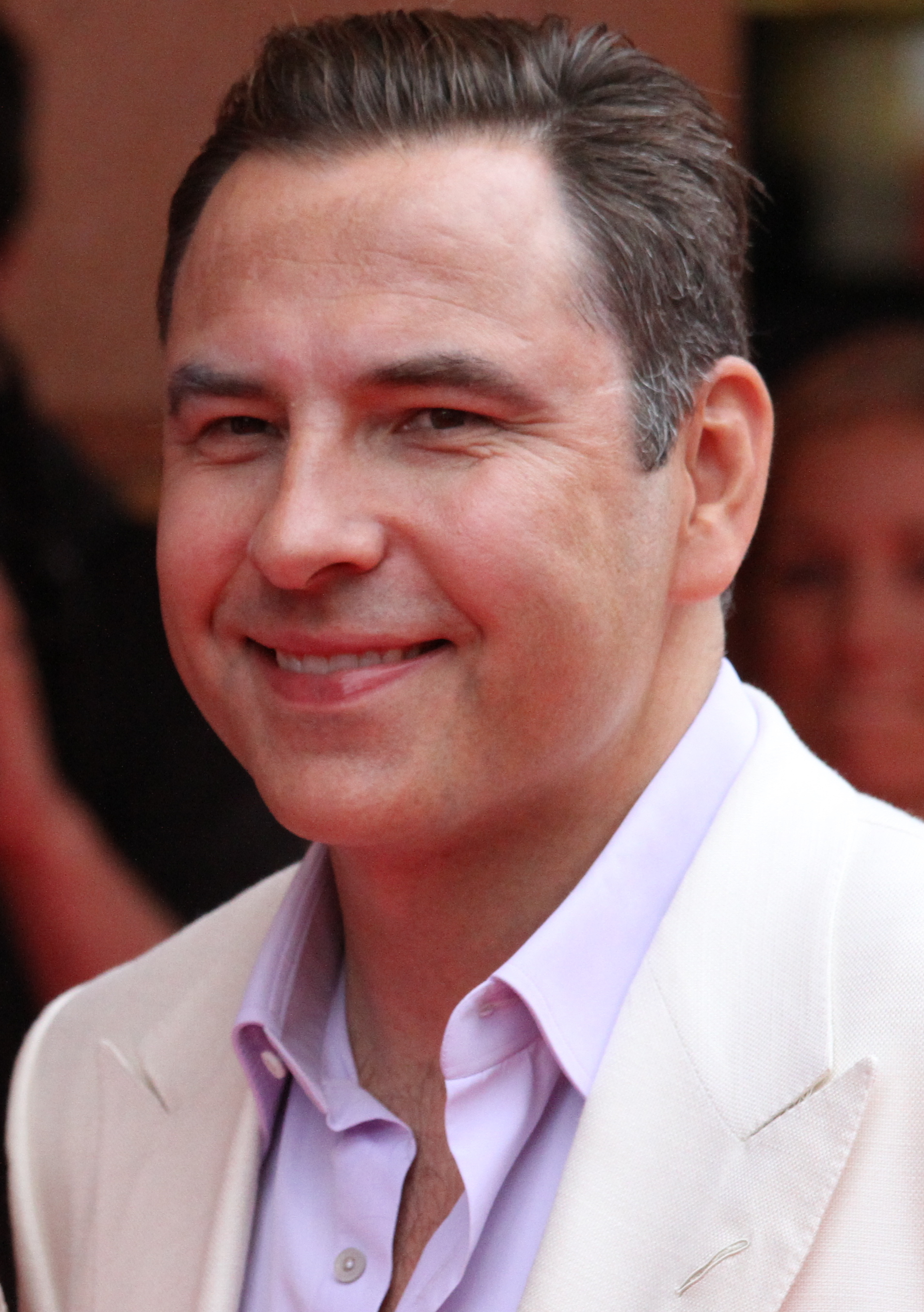
David Walliams

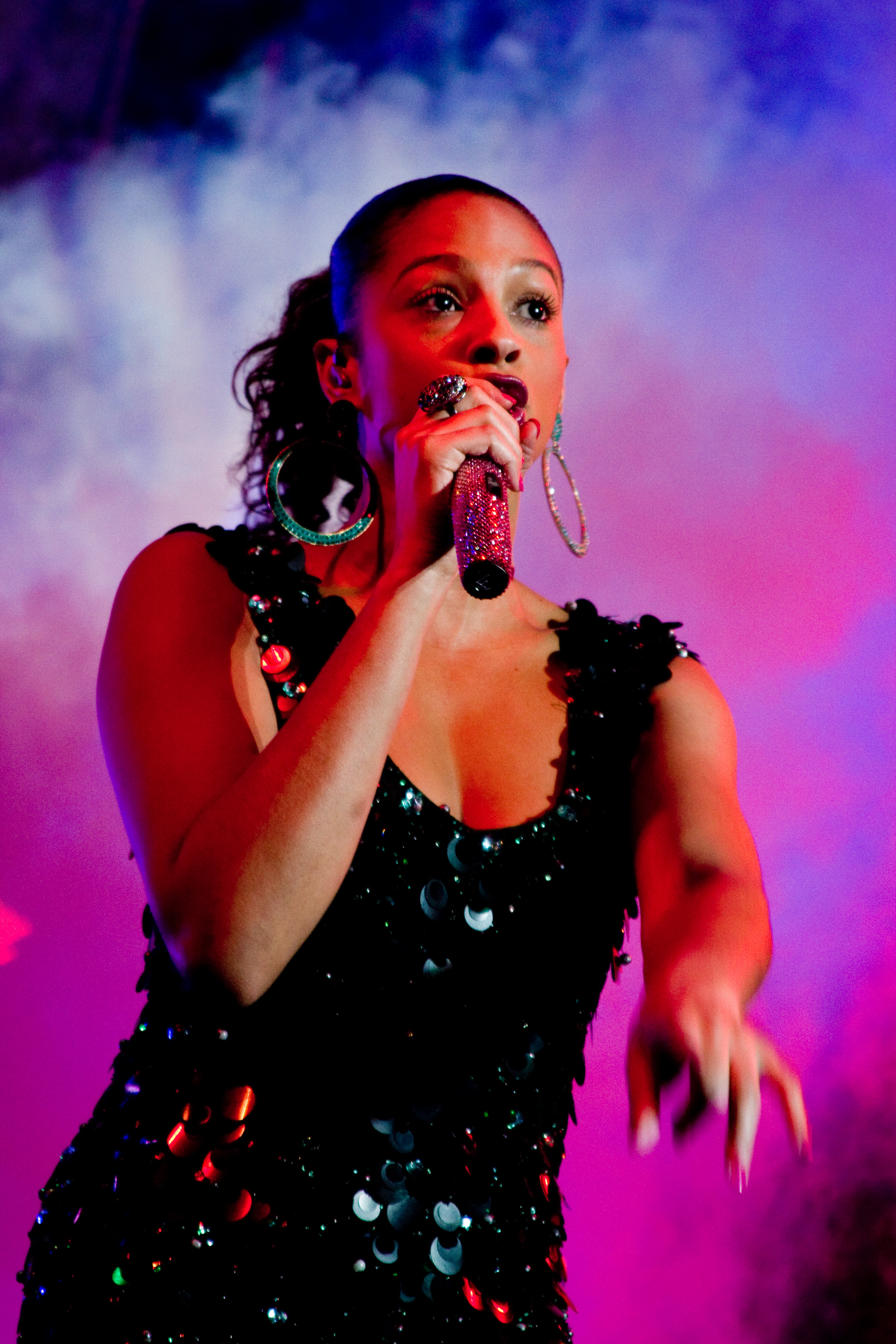
Alesha Dixon

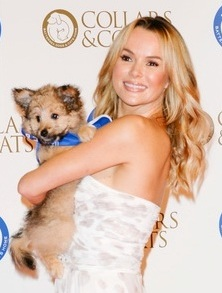
Amanda Holden

Simon Cowell

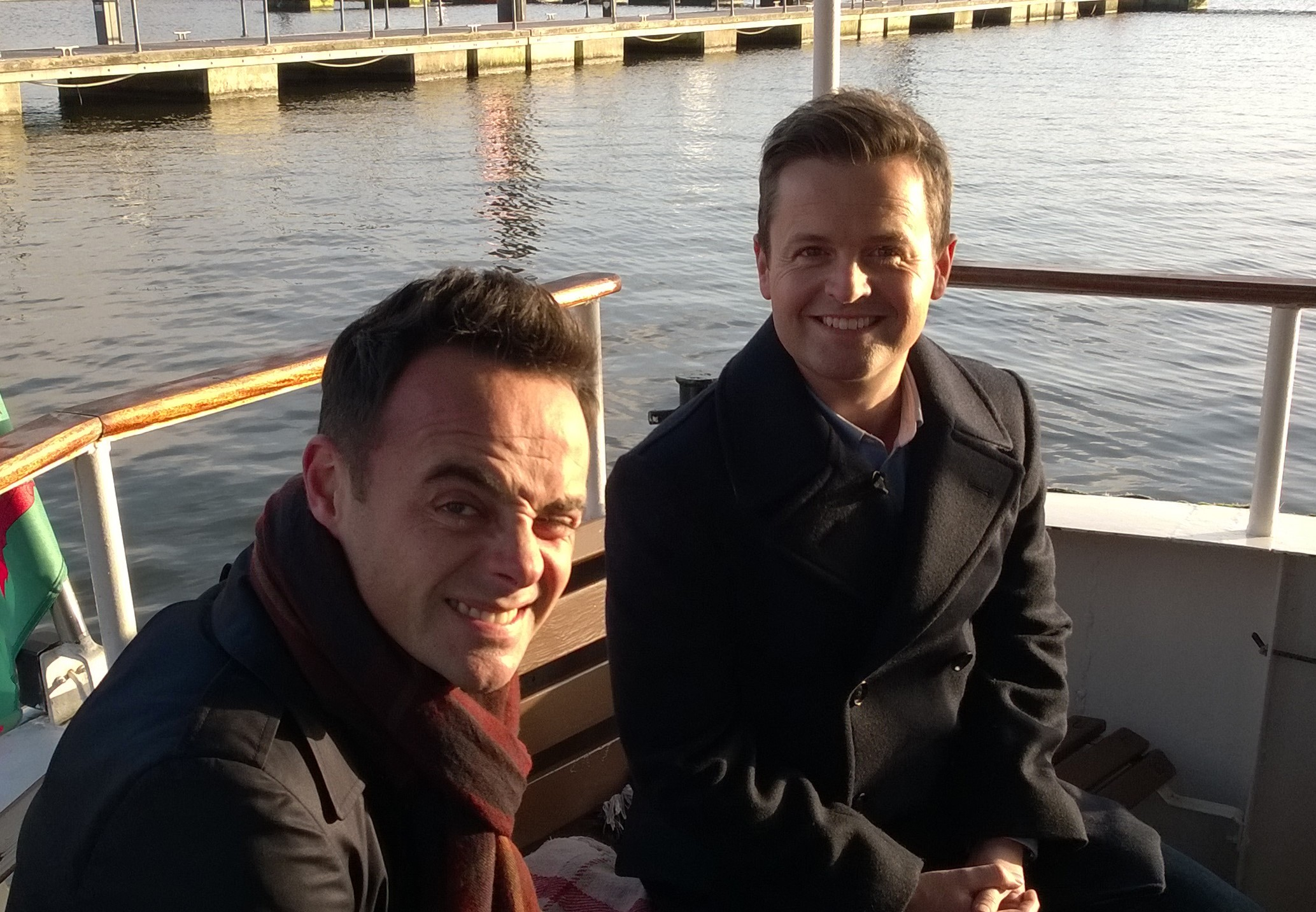
Ant & Dec (ITV1)

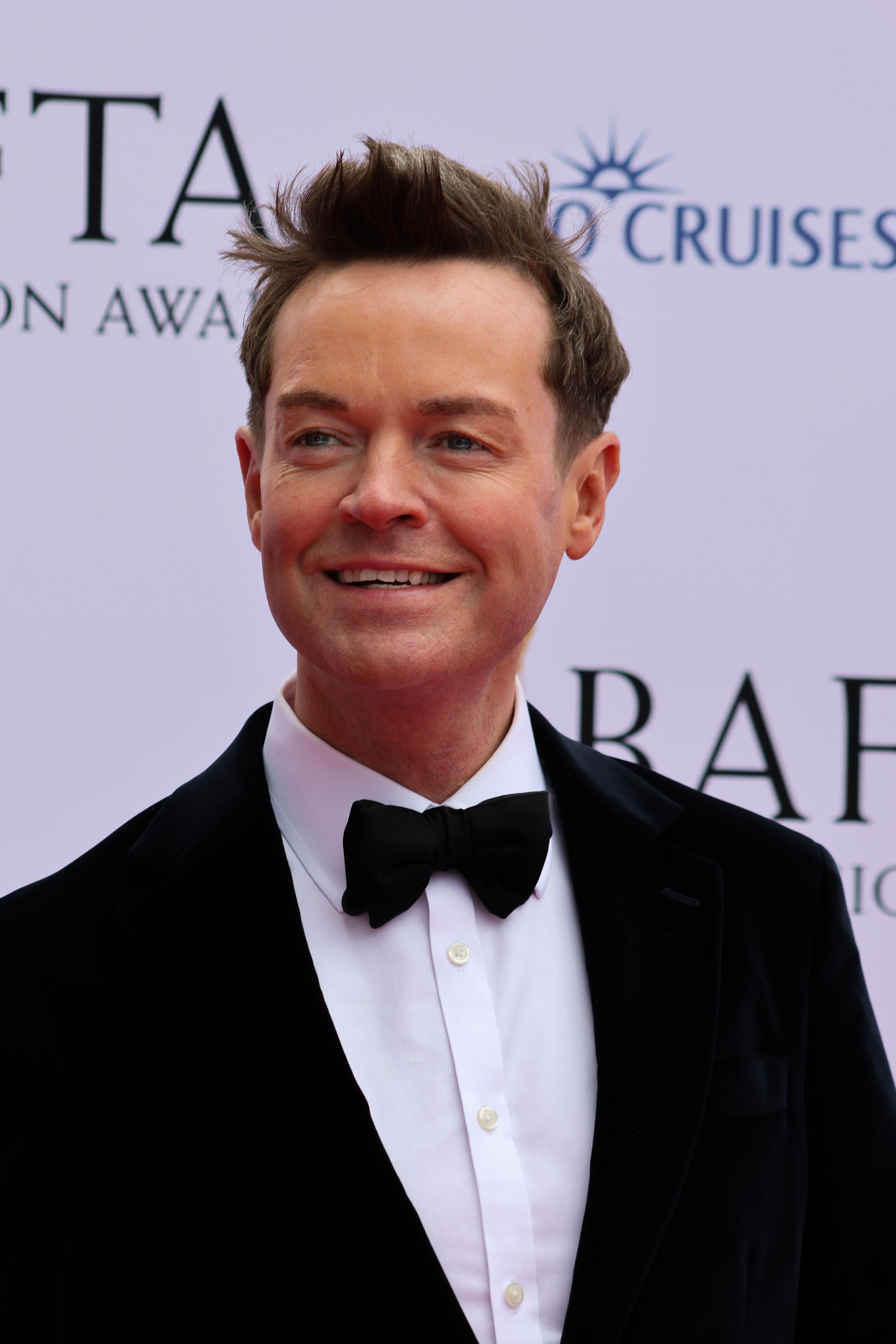
Stephen Mulhern (ITV2)

The thirteenth series of British talent competition programme Britain's Got Talent was broadcast on ITV, from 6 April to 2 June 2019. This series became the first to see the return of Ant McPartlin to his television duties, hosting alongside Dec Donnelly (colloquially forming the hosting duo known as Ant & Dec), following his absence the previous year to attend rehabilitation prior to the start of the previous series' live episodes. Alongside McPartlin's return, the competition for this year saw the oldest participant to win Britain's Got Talent, and the surprise return of a performer who participated in a previous year's contest, operating under an alias until their final appearance.

The thirteenth series was won by 89-year-old singer Colin Thackery, with mentalist Marc Spelmann (under the stage name "X") finishing in second place and magician Ben Hart third. During its broadcast, the series averaged 8.32 million viewers.

== Series overview ==
The judges' auditions took place between January and February 2019, within London and Manchester. During filming of the London auditions, the event was kick-started by a special performance from Susan Boyle to mark her 10th year as a singer since she first made her appearance on Britain's Got Talent's third series. One of the most notable auditionees for this year's contest was David J. Watson – a participant who had auditioned for 10 years for a place on the programme without success. His latest attempt led to the host of Britain's Got More Talent, Stephen Mulhern, triggering a Golden Buzzer for him. This action led to speculation in the media over whether this had been officially allowed, but it was later revealed to have been disallowed on the grounds that it did not fall under the contest rules, as Mulhern had no official allowance to provide a Golden Buzzer act.

This series featured two notable events during its broadcast. The first to take place was the forced withdrawal of an act – extreme magicians Brotherhood – who had secured a spot in the semi-finals. Despite Brotherhood's success in the auditions landing them a place in the fifth and final semi-final, concerns over health and safety were raised about the dangerous nature of their performance, leading to the group of magicians withdrawing their involvement at the request of the production staff and broadcaster, and their place being offered to another act which had been eliminated during auditions. Additionally, a dance troupe who had made it to the semi final stage also withdrew following the death of one of their members. The group's audition was not broadcast. The second was the surprise revelation that a participant who had operated under anonymity was in reality a former semi-finalist from the previous year's contest who had re-entered the contest for this year in order to emphasise the values of hope and perseverance.

Of the participants that took part, only 40 made it into the five live semi-finals – of these acts, dancer Akshat Singh, band Chapter 13, choir Flakefleet Primary School, singer Giorgia Borg, and stand-up comedian Kojo Anim each received a golden buzzer during their auditions – with eight appearing in each one, and eleven of these acts making it into the live final; the wildcard act chosen by the judges was dance duo Libby & Charlie, after they lost out in a tied judges' vote in the last semi-final round. The following below lists the results of each participant's overall performance in this series:

Winner | Runner-up | Finalist | Semi-finalist
Judges' Wildcard Finalist | Golden Buzzer Audition

Participant	Age(s) ^{1}	Genre	Act	Semi-final	Result
4MG	17–19	Magic	Magic Group	2	Finalist
Akshat Singh	13	Dance	Dancer	1	Eliminated
Angels Inc.	23–28	Magic	Magic Group	3	Eliminated
Barbara Nice	65	Comedy	Stand Up Comedian	5	Eliminated
Ben Hart	28	Magic	Magician	4	Third Place
Brian Gilligan	32	Singing	Singer	1	Eliminated
Chapter 13	14–15	Singing / Music	Band	3	Eliminated
Colin Thackery	89	Singing	Singer	3	Winner
Dave & Finn	42 & 9	Animals / Magic	Mentalist & Dog Handler	1	Finalist
Duo A&J	28 & 26	Acrobatics	Aerial Duo	4	Eliminated
Fabulous Sisters ^{3}	12–26	Dance	Japanese Dance Group	5	Eliminated
Faith Tucker	18	Singing	Opera Singer	2	Eliminated
Flakefleet Primary School	4–11	Singing	Choir	1	Finalist
Giorgia Borg	10	Singing	Singer	2	Eliminated
Gomonov Knife Show	25 & 36	Danger	Knife Throwing Duo	3	Eliminated
Gonzo	33	Music	Tambourinist	5	Eliminated
Graeme Mathews	34	Comedy / Magic	Comic Magician	4	Eliminated
Jacob Jones	27	Singing	Singer	5	Eliminated
Jimmy Tamley	64	Comedy	Ventriloquist	4	Eliminated
John Archer	58	Comedy / Magic	Comic Magician	3	Eliminated
Jonathan Goodwin	39	Danger	Escape Artist	5	Finalist
Kerr James	12	Singing	Singer	4	Eliminated
Khronos Girls	15–18	Dance	Contemporary Dance Group	1	Eliminated
KNE	22–35	Dance	Dance Group	3	Eliminated
Kojo Anim	39	Comedy	Stand Up Comedian	3	Finalist
Leanne Mya	31	Singing	Singer	5	Eliminated
Libby & Charlie ^{4}	11	Dance	Contemporary Dance Duo	5	Finalist
Lil' Icons ^{2}	7–18	Dance	Dance Group	4	Eliminated
Mark McMullan	23	Singing	Singer	4	Finalist
Matt Stirling	46	Danger / Magic	Stunt Magician	2	Eliminated
Rob King	28	Singing	Musical Theatre Singer	3	Eliminated
Rosie & Adam ^{2}	21 & 38	Danger	Rollerskating Duo	1	Eliminated
Siobhan Phillips	42	Comedy / Singing / Music	Comic Singer & Pianist	2	Finalist
State of the Fart ^{2}	26	Music	Manualist	2	Eliminated
The Haunting ^{2}	38	Magic	Horror Magician	1	Eliminated
The Queen	92^{7}	Comedy	Drag Comedian	2	Eliminated
Tony Rudd	58	Comedy	Impressionist	1	Eliminated
Ursula Burns	48	Comedy / Singing / Music	Comic Harpist & Singer	4	Eliminated
Vardanyan Brothers ^{3}	28 & 30	Acrobatics	Acrobatic Duo	2	Eliminated
X^{8}	47	Magic	Magician	5	Runner-Up

- ^1 Ages denoted for a participant(s), pertain to their final performance for this series.
- ^2 These acts originally auditioned under different names, before changing them for their Semi-Final appearances.
- ^3 These participants each required their coach to act as translator, due to their limited or lack of knowledge on the English language.
- ^4 Libby & Charlie initially failed to reach the semi-finals, but were later brought back after magic trio Brotherhood were forced to withdraw at the advice of production staff and the broadcaster.
- ^5 Details on both the locations for and ages of each member of The Haunting were not disclosed during their time on the programme.
- ^6 This participant's actual age was not officially disclosed as such during their time on the programme.
- ^7 The age listed here is Queen Elizabeth II's age as of the live shows, listed as a joke in keeping with the gimmick of the act, and not the actual age of the performer, who was actually 62.
- ^8 Marc Spelmann's identity was kept a secret by production staff throughout the series - all details listed here pertain to his unveiling in the final.

=== Semi-finals summary ===
Buzzed out | Judges' vote | Won the public vote
Won the judges' vote | Lost the judges' vote | Eliminated

==== Semi-final 1 (27 May) ====
- Guest performance: Cast Of On Your Feet! & Gloria Estefan ("Rhythm Is Gonna Get You"/"Conga"/"Get on Your Feet")

Semi-Finalist	Order	Performance Type	Buzzes and judges' votes				Percentage	Finished
Semi-Finalist	Order	Performance Type	Cowell	Holden	Dixon	Walliams	Percentage	Finished
Akshat Singh	1	Dancer					3.6%	7th - Eliminated
Tony Rudd	2	Impressionist					5.6%	6th - Eliminated
Brian Gilligan	3	Singer					3.4%	8th - Eliminated
The Haunting	4	Horror Magician					13.4%	3rd (Lost Judges' Vote)
Flakefleet Primary School	5	Choir					25.6%	2nd (Won Judges' Vote)
Khronos Girls	6	Contemporary Dance Group					6.8%	5th - Eliminated
Dave & Finn	7	Mentalist & Dog Handler					29.2%	1st (Won Public Vote)
Rosie & Adam	8	Rollerskating Duo					12.4%	4th - Eliminated

==== Semi-final 2 (28 May) ====
- Guest performance: Cast of Six ("Ex-Wives")

Semi-Finalist	Order	Performance Type	Buzzes and judges' votes				Percentage	Finished
Semi-Finalist	Order	Performance Type	Cowell	Holden	Dixon	Walliams	Percentage	Finished
The Queen	1	Drag Comedian					4.0%	8th - Eliminated
State of the Fart	2	Manulist					5.5%	7th - Eliminated
Vardanyan Brothers	3	Acrobatic Duo					8.9%	6th - Eliminated
Giorgia Borg	4	Singer					11.3%	5th - Eliminated
Matt Stirling	5	Stunt Magician					14.9%	3rd (Lost Judges' Vote)
Siobhan Phillips	6	Comic Singer & Pianist					15.9%	2nd (Won Judges' Vote)
4MG	7	Magic Group					28.2%	1st (Won Public Vote)
Faith Tucker	8	Opera Singer					11.3%	4th - Eliminated

==== Semi-final 3 (29 May) ====
- Guest performance: James Arthur & Freckled Sky ("Falling Like the Stars")

Semi-Finalist	Order	Performance Type	Buzzes and judges' votes				Percentage	Finished
Semi-Finalist	Order	Performance Type	Cowell	Holden	Dixon	Walliams	Percentage	Finished
Angels Inc.	1	Illusion Group					4.2%	5th - Eliminated
Rob King	2	Musical Theatre Singer					3.3%	6th - Eliminated
KNE	3	Dance Group					1.3%	8th - Eliminated
John Archer	4	Comic Magician				^{8}	19.0%	3rd (Lost Judges' Vote)
Gomonov Knife Show	5	Knife Throwing Duo					2.6%	7th - Eliminated
Colin Thackery	6	Singer					29.1%	1st (Won Public Vote)
Kojo Anim	7	Stand Up Comedian				^{8}	23.9%	2nd (Won Judges' Vote)
Chapter 13	8	Band					16.6%	4th - Eliminated

- ^8 Due to the majority vote for Kojo Anim, Walliams' voting intention was not revealed.

==== Semi-final 4 (30 May) ====
- Guest performance: BTS ("Boy with Luv")

Semi-Finalist	Order	Performance Type	Buzzes and judges' votes				Percentage	Finished
Semi-Finalist	Order	Performance Type	Cowell	Holden	Dixon	Walliams	Percentage	Finished
Lil' Icons	1	Dance Group					9.3%	5th - Eliminated
Ursula Burns	2	Comic Singer & Harpist					0.6%	8th - Eliminated
Kerr James	3	Singer					11.3%	4th - Eliminated
Graeme Mathews	4	Comic Magician					12.5%	3rd (Judges' Vote tied – Lost on Public Vote)
Duo A&J	5	Aerial Duo					6.6%	6th - Eliminated
Jimmy Tamley	6	Ventriloquist					5.7%	7th - Eliminated
Ben Hart	7	Magician					28.6%	1st (Won Public Vote)
Mark McMullan	8	Singer					25.4%	2nd (Judges' Vote tied – Won on Public Vote)

==== Semi-final 5 (31 May) ====
- Guest performance: Jason Donovan, Sheridan Smith & Cast Of Joseph and the Amazing Technicolor Dreamcoat ("Jacob and Sons/Joseph's Coat"/"Any Dream Will Do"/"Song of the King"/"Go, Go, Go Joseph")

Semi-Finalist	Order	Performance Type	Buzzes and judges' votes				Percentage	Finished
Semi-Finalist	Order	Performance Type	Cowell	Holden	Dixon	Walliams	Percentage	Finished
Gonzo	1	Tambourinist					7.4%	6th - Eliminated
X	2	Mentalist					27.4%	1st (Won Public Vote)
Jacob Jones	3	Singer					2.3%	7th - Eliminated
Fabulous Sisters	4	Japanese Dance Group					1.1%	8th - Eliminated
Leanne Mya	5	Singer					8.7%	5th - Eliminated
Barbara Nice	6	Stand Up Comedian					14.1%	4th - Eliminated
Libby & Charlie^{9}	7	Contemporary Dance Duo					17.0%	3rd (Judges' Vote tied – Lost on Public Vote)
Jonathan Goodwin	8	Escape Artist					22.0%	2nd (Judges' Vote tied – Won on Public Vote)

- ^9 Libby & Charlie were later sent through to the final as the judges' wildcard.

=== Final (2 June) ===
- Guest performances: Diversity & DVJ and Susan Boyle & Michael Ball ("A Million Dreams")

Winner | Runner-up

Finalist	Order	Performance Type	Percentage	Finished
Dave & Finn	1	Mentalist & Dog Handler	9.1%	5th
Flakefleet Primary School	2	Choir	8.8%	6th
Ben Hart	3	Magician	10.2%	3rd
Libby & Charlie	4	Contemporary Dance Duo	3.9%	10th
4MG	5	Magic Group	2.3%	11th
Mark McMullan	6	Singer	4.6%	7th
Jonathan Goodwin	7	Escape Artist	4.4%	8th
Siobhan Phillips	8	Comic Singer & Pianist	4.0%	9th
X	9	Mentalist	17.8%	2nd
Kojo Anim	10	Stand Up Comedian	9.6%	4th
Colin Thackery	11	Singer	25.3%	1st

== Ratings ==
Episode	Air date	Total viewers (millions)	ITV Weekly rank
Auditions 1	6 April	10.30	1
Auditions 2	13 April	10.12	1
Auditions 3	20 April	9.13	1
Auditions 4	27 April	9.78	1
Auditions 5	4 May	9.66	1
Auditions 6	11 May	9.39	1
Auditions 7	18 May	8.53	1
Auditions 8	25 May	8.04	1
Semi-final 1	27 May	8.69	2
Semi-final 1 results	27 May	6.68	12
Semi-final 2	28 May	7.64	4
Semi-final 2 results	28 May	6.12	17
Semi-final 3	29 May	7.70	3
Semi-final 3 results	29 May	5.59	20
Semi-final 4	30 May	7.26	6
Semi-final 4 results	30 May	5.58	21
Semi-final 5	31 May	7.03	10
Semi-final 5 results	31 May	5.92	18
Final	2 June	9.73	1
