= Drew Lynch =

American stand-up comedian (born 1991)

- Born: Andrew Lynch; August 10, 1991 (age 35); Indianapolis, Indiana, U.S.
- Notable work: Runner-up on America's Got Talent
- Parent(s): Tim Lynch (father); Chris Lynch (mother)
- Relatives: Taylor Lynch (brother); McKaylyn Lynch (sister)

Comedy career
- Years active: 2009–present
- Genres: Observational comedy; black comedy; self-deprecation; insult comedy
- Subjects: Stuttering; everyday life; human behavior; social awkwardness; marriage; dogs
- Website: drewlynch.com

Andrew "Drew" Lynch (born August 10, 1991), is an American stand-up comedian. He is known for his 2015 performances on America's Got Talent (AGT), where he finished in second place in the 10th season finale, for his long-running YouTube series Dog Vlog, and for the quick-witted crowd work that often constitutes a substantial portion of his on-stage performances. Major themes of his work include his relationships, his stature, his willingness to say things which are patently taboo, and his occasional stutter.

== Early life and education ==
Lynch was born in Indianapolis, Indiana, to parents Tim and Chris Lynch. The eldest of three children, he attended Robey Elementary School in Wayne Township until age 9, when his family moved to Las Vegas. Drew was determined to be an actor, so his parents enrolled him in the Las Vegas Academy of the Arts (LVA). He read plays constantly, whether they were homework assignments or not. At a 2022 TED talk, he recalled that he rode the city bus to school at 11 years old by himself. "Every day on those commutes I read all of Neil Simon, Tennessee Williams, Shakespeare, and all of my hard work was paying off, because the very first play I got cast in, Charlie and the Chocolate Factory, I landed the lead role of Oompa-Loompa."

In 2008, he played Joseph Merrick in the Bernard Pomerance play The Elephant Man at the LVA's Lowden Theater. A theater critic wrote, "Drew Lynch is a high school junior with what some might call wholesome, all-American good looks. But he seems to lose his attractiveness in the Las Vegas Academy of International Studies, Performing and Visual Arts production of The Elephant Man. With no obvious makeup, he plays a disfigured man. Under the direction of Terry McGonigle, he gets us to believe not only that he's physically challenged, but that he's spiritually dying. He seems to have an intuitive understanding of the role, and you can't help but wonder how a boy so young can know so much about human behavior."

After graduating high school, at 19 he moved to Los Angeles. Lynch planned to become a movie actor, and he aspired to dramatic and leading man roles.

== The softball accident ==
In 2011, when he was 20, Lynch was working as a ticket taker at Flappers Comedy Club in Burbank, California and auditioning for TV and film roles. He knew he had made his way into Hollywood when he received audition callbacks for How I Met Your Mother and Mad Men, and he had tryouts for Nickelodeon and a Disney show lined up. "I remember that week I was on, like, cloud nine," he told comedian Ryan Sickler in an on-air interview. "It never happens that quick in...this industry, and for me it might not have; but at the same time it felt like I was really making a lot of momentum."

However, the day before the casting meeting for How I Met Your Mother, an accident during a rec league softball game with a team from work changed his life. (Note: They were playing against the Burbank Fire Department team, he laughingly recalled, who took pride in their reputation for toughness and foul plays.) That Sunday, his position was shortstop, he told an interviewer. "I was playing softball and a hard-hit ball took a bad hop and struck me in the throat. I fell and smacked my head on the ground." He returned with the Flappers team to work that night, but he was so dazed, they sent him home and he slept. Lynch told The Indianapolis Star, "I woke up talking much slower." His roommate was so upset he called Lynch's parents, and he felt bad enough to go to the hospital. With paralyzed vocal cords, a traumatic brain injury, and a concussion, he was diagnosed with a resulting neurogenic stutter. (Note: On The HoneyDew with Ryan Sickler in 2023, Lynch talked at length about the aftermath of the accident, his emotional reactions, and how it changed his speech patterns forever. In the interview, he speaks of ridicule and social dissonance, of being "distanced" and "isolated" and the dangers of "a victim mindset." "Feeling like 'you can only be sad about it,' it can only get you so far, and you can only do it for so long. Which, by the way, I think it is healthy to be, like, 'This sucks and I'm in a shitty spot right now.' Address it, and then you gotta do what you can to get out of it." He discussed the necessity for planning words and sentences beforehand: "People who stutter, we all do this, we're always thinking ahead to things that, that we get stuck on." "You're circumventing all the time... That contributes a lot to this vicious cycle, because you get so much anxiety. Not from, not from just the stutter, but it's also because I can't, sometimes, be fully in this conversation with you." "You miss human connection because you're literally directing your life all the time." Stuttering can lead to planned word substitutions: "I'm thinking all the time about that way that I say things and not, not necessarily just what I want to say.")

Doctors thought the stutter was temporary, but Lynch missed the audition for How I Met Your Mother. His agent and manager weren't willing to wait. "I called my agent reps to tell them what happened. They dropped me." While in the hospital, he began writing his angry thoughts on napkins, and then turning some of them into punchlines. Lynch told an interviewer for The Spokesman-Review, "I got the cold shoulder and I realized that I wanted control while I rehabbed, and that's when I discovered stand-up."

"I remember feeling just devastated," he told the Tucson Weekly. "I had meetings with casting directors. I felt like I was on the cusp of booking some nice stuff. I struggled with it, and I struggled with it immensely before realizing that I was going to have to do something to get out of it. I had to feel I could get that control back again. I like to be in control all the time. But before that, it was heavy, heavy stages of grief and anger."

To help manage his condition, Drew found an emotional support dog, a Vizsla named Stella, to live with him.

== Career ==
Lynch already knew Samuel J. Comroe, (Note: Comroe was a Grand-finalist on America's Got Talent season 13.) who has Tourette syndrome and who frequently performed stand-up at the Flappers Comedy Club. They became friends, encouraged each other, and in the early 2010s began touring the comedy club and college circuit together, with material poking fun at their disabilities. The latter half of their sets frequently featured Question and Answer comedy sessions, followed by a meet-and-greet. In his 2022 TED talk, Lynch speaks of winning a local comedy contest not long after his injury; the video of that set was seen by comedian Bo Burnham, who invited Drew to perform as the opening act at The Vic Theatre in Chicago during Burnham's 2013 what. tour.

He performed 500 sets in 2014 alone. "I've done shows in living rooms, cancer units and laundromats," he said. That year, he also appeared in The Makings of a Stand-Up Comedian, a documentary film about thirteen comedians all at different stages in their career.

During Lynch's routine at a September 2025 show in Spokane, Washington, a man in the audience suffered a heart attack. Lynch stopped the show while others performed CPR on the man, eventually saving his life. Lynch credited the audience afterwards for their quick thinking, and personally went to visit the man in the hospital.

=== America's Got Talent ===
Among thousands of other competitors, Lynch auditioned for season 10 of America's Got Talent on May 26, 2015. He described how he had decided, after developing his stutter, to pursue a career in stand-up "as a way of coping with it." "I believe you can turn anything into a positive," he said, "that's why I'm here." His jokes drew standing ovations, and the audience chanted "Send him through!", signalling that they wanted unanimous approval from the judges. When the judges (Howard Stern, Heidi Klum, Mel B, and Howie Mandel) gave their reactions, Mandel hit the show's "Golden Buzzer", sending Lynch straight to the quarterfinal live shows at Radio City Music Hall. (Note: Lynch and Mandel remained friends. "Howie, who has obsessive compulsive disorder, championed me. I felt he was talking to me peer-to-peer.") Lynch competed in the quarterfinals, semifinals, and finals.

His quarterfinals appearance, on August 11, consisted of joking about his service dog Stella, with the punchline a joke about having a cat with Tourette's, an in-joke for his friend Comroe. His semifinals and finals competitions, held September 1 and 15, were again about his stuttering. Lynch consistently drew standing ovations and was among the top five performers. In the end, he finished in second place behind ventriloquist Paul Zerdin.

In 2019, he appeared on America's Got Talent: The Champions.

After his AGT success, Lynch moved back to Las Vegas, where he performed live shows. Later, he returned to Los Angeles to work on new projects.

=== YouTube ===
Lynch has a YouTube channel at which he posts content, mostly in the style of self-deprecating and observational comedy, with over 2.5 million subscribers (as of August, 2025). He said in 2022, "People think I grew my audience on America's Got Talent. I actually grew my audience on YouTube. When I got done with AGT, I had 80,000 subscribers, which is a lot. Now I have over 2 million. ... I bought cameras that I couldn't afford. I got editing software that I knew nothing about... I would just vlog about a new experience once a week."

=== Stella and Dog Vlog ===
For several years he streamed a series titled Dog Vlog, starring his service dog Stella, whose wry and snarky responses to his conversations with her appeared in speech balloons. Lynch told an interviewer that she excelled as an emotional support dog, because he could lie down and say "comfort" and Stella would come close for as long as he needed. Stella had first become famous with Lynch's America's Got Talent quarterfinals appearance, in which he joked, "People are crazy, because they'll come up and ask questions to my dog. I'm the one that can talk... kinda." Fans saw in his videos that, talking to Stella, he didn't stutter nearly as much. Lynch created an Instagram page for her, Stella Lynch, Queen of the Internet (@morefamousthanmydad).

Beginning in December 2017, Lynch starred in a flash animation series named Therapy Dog, created with animator Tony Celano. The series was about a character called Andy (Lynch) recounting his daily struggles with his dog acting as his therapist.

== Albums ==
Lynch released his first album, Concussed, on Spotify in November 2021.

== Personal life ==
Lynch began dating Melanie Sergiev in 2017, and they were wedded in a mountaintop ceremony in Vermont on June 18, 2022.

On January 20, 2022, Lynch's dog Stella died at age 8 from a neurological degenerative disease.

On February 25, 2026, Lynch announced his separation from Sergiev on Instagram.

=== Stuttering ===
Lynch's use of his speech impediment has been called inspiring. "People resonate with adversity," he has said. "I've been able to impact people with disabilities who were about to give up. That gives what I do such a greater purpose."

He enjoys audience interaction, but frequently has to deal with hecklers during his stand-up gigs, and many of these incidents appear on his YouTube and TikTok channels. (Note: On TikTok, he has videos titled "Stand-Up Comedy: Handling Hecklers with Humor." An egregious example at YouTube is titled "The Only Heckler I've Ever Kicked Out.") "I'm an easy target. At first, the heckling was born from people in the audience feeling uncomfortable. Now it's mainly people who are either super intoxicated or super unaware."

During the years after his America's Got Talent appearances, Lynch's stutter had improved to the point that his YouTube fans commented they barely noticed it. (Note: Lynch told Ryan Sickler that many in the audience at stand-up gigs or in the YouTube comments also refuse to believe the stutter is real. "My relationship with my speech has been so tumultuous because I, I used it initially to make self-deprecating jokes to really heal — and then because I've gotten so much progress over my speech, and then I had success with my speech, people now criticize the legitimacy of it, and if, and if it's an act, or if I put it on!" At Sickler's surprise, Lynch confirmed that he has met disability skepticism, a form of ableist disbelief in invisible disabilities, for years. "I [still] get it now. I did America's Got Talent almost eight years ago, and my speech was way different then than it is now. And consistently — no one sees my medical bills, no one sees the, the amount of professional, medical professionals.") He told an audience (with only a few stutters),

I was initially mocked for having it, and then later called a liar for succeeding despite having it. Damned if I do, damned if I don't. I'm telling you this because one day, Comedy Central asked me to submit a half-hour stand-up routine. The problem was, people kept heckling me during the show, and so I would have to stop in order to address it. Eight consecutive shows I filmed, and couldn't get through a full set without being interrupted, which, interrupting someone who stutters, that's like tickling someone who's gassy. [Here the audience erupted in laughter. A bit later he continued:] I so badly wanted to go off on these people who were interrupting. I wanted to unload years of trauma, tell them how they'll never know what going to speech therapy is like, or the carousel of mental health professionals I saw. How I went to meditation retreats to manage my anxiety, and visited support groups, and took singing lessons, and microdosing, acupuncture, chiropractors, yoga, tai chi, sound baths, float tanks, alcohol, marijuana, life coaches, religion, and self-harm in order to cope with my situation. But instead of unpacking all of that, I went against my natural inclination. I stayed playful, and I addressed those interruptions in a fun way... Sure enough, a lady came up to me after one of the shows, and she said, "I loved what you wrote, but I want you to know that my favorite part was when you went off script." ... I never got on Comedy Central, by the way, but I did release those audience interactions on my own channel, and as some of you may know, that led to even more people discovering me.

In 2024, he posted a video titled "My Stutter Came Back...", in which he discussed recent stress and bodily spasms with a therapist and included footage of onstage appearances with before-and-after examples within a single week. In September 2024, he haltingly told a comedy club audience, "It's been a good week in that my stutter has been a fucking asshole. I don't really necessarily get to control it all the time, but right now it's ... exorcism-style." The audience shouted, "We love you!" and gave him a standing ovation.

== Filmography ==
=== Film ===
| Year | Title | Role | Notes |
|---|---|---|---|
| 2014 | The Makings of a Stand-Up Comedian | Himself | Documentary written and directed by T.M. "Tasha" Caufield |
| 2018 | Drew Lynch: Intervention | Himself | Short film with comedians Mesa Kronhaus and Kenny Garcia |
| 2018 | Service Dog Bodyguard | Himself | Short film with Brandon Rogers in the title role |
| 2018 | Secret Santa | Kyle | Film (a Christmas-time horror comedy) |
| 2018 | If People Acted Like Dogs | Himself | TV movie, with Lynch's service dog Stella, Preacher Lawson, Alexandra Catalano, Megan Helbing, Freddy John James, and Mesa Kronhaus |
| 2025 | This Is Our City | Clerk | Film (a gangster comedy) |

=== Television ===
| Year | Title | Role | Notes |
|---|---|---|---|
| 2015 | America's Got Talent | Himself | TV series, 7 episodes (audition; quarterfinals; semifinals; finals; Grande Finale) |
| 2015 | The Dr. Oz Show | Himself | TV series, 1 episode |
| 2015 | Dogs & Me | Billy | TV series, 1 episode ("Sorry Laura") |
| 2016 | Maron | Adam | TV series, recurring role, 4 episodes |
| 2017 | Cassandra French's Finishing School | Doug | TV series, recurring role, 6 episodes |
| 2017 | Totally Megan | Bill | TV series, 1 episode ("Bah HumBug") |
| 2017 | Conan | Himself | TV series, 1 episode |
| 2018 | We're Not Friends | Cameron | TV series, 1 episode ("Can't Live with 'Em, Can't Live Without 'Em") |
| 2018 | The 2018 Media Access Awards | Himself | TV special |
| 2019 | Home & Family | Himself | American daytime talk show |
| 2019 | America's Got Talent: The Champions | Himself - Contestant | Spin-off of America's Got Talent (episode S1.E4 "The Champions Four") |
| 2019 | The Comedy Store Tonight | Himself | TV series, 1 episode |
| 2020 | The Stand-Up Show with Jon Dore | Himself | TV series, 1 episode |

=== Stand-up specials ===
| Year | Title | Role | Notes |
|---|---|---|---|
| 2017 | Did I Stutter? | Himself | Directed by Adam Marcus; features Howie Mandel (76 min.) |
| 2021 | Concussed | Himself | Directed by Aristotle Athari; features Monarey Martinez as "Voice of Goddess" (69 min.) |
| 2023 | Short King | Himself | Live performance at the Center Stage Theater in Atlanta, GA (45 min.) |
| 2023 | And These Are Jokes | Himself | Live performance (40 min.) |
| 2025 | The Stuttering Comedian | Himself | Live performance recorded in Chicago in January, 2025; officially released on YouTube on June 27, 2025 (63 min.) |

=== Web series ===
| Year | Title | Role | Notes |
|---|---|---|---|
| 2026 | Crowd Control | Himself | Episode: "Sort of a Papa Bear, Mama Bear, Baby Bear Situation" |

== See also ==
- List of stutterers
- List of United States stand-up comedians
- List of YouTubers
- America's Got Talent
- Stuttering
- Stuttering in popular culture
