= Merited Artist of the Russian Federation =

Honorary title of Russia

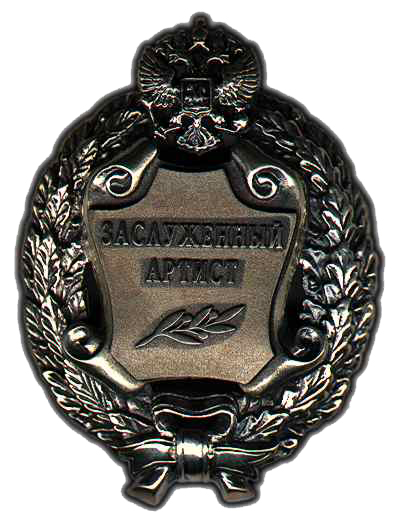
- Chest badge "Merited Artist of the Russian Federation"
- Type: Honorary title
- Country: Russia
- Established: 30 December 1995

Precedence
- Next (higher): People's Artist of Russia

Merited Artist of the Russian Federation (Russian: Заслуженный артист Российской Федерации, Zasluzhenny artist Rossiyskoy Federatsii), also known as Honored Artist of Russia, is an honorary title in the Russian Federation. The title is awarded to actors, directors, filmmakers, writers, dancers, and singers for exceptional achievements in the arts.

The honorary title was originally modeled after the German honorific title for distinguished opera singers. Historically, the title was bestowed by princes or kings, when it was styled Hofkammersänger(in). In Imperial Russia before 1917, several stars of stage and film were honored with the title "Imperial singer", but after the October Revolution of 1917, the new regime made changes and established the title of the Merited Artist of Russia (Russian SFSR and Soviet Union).

After the collapse of the USSR in 1991, Russian president Boris Yeltsin created a new award, first presented on 30 December 1995.

== See also ==
- People's Artist
- People's Artist of Russia
- Merited Artist (Albania)
- Merited Artist of Ukraine
- Merited Artist of Vietnam
