= Giang Brothers =

Acrobats from Vietnam

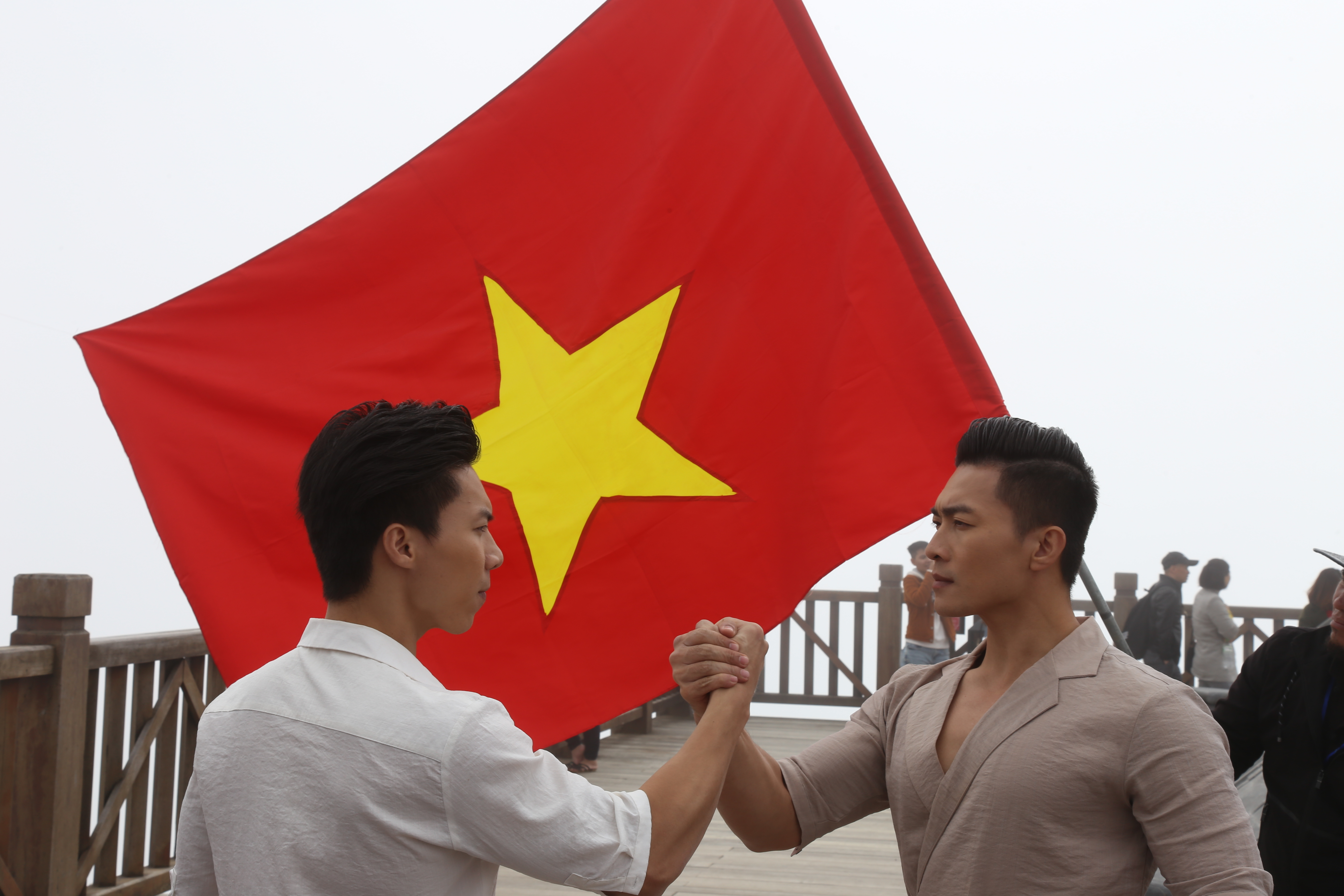

Background information
- Origin: Ho Chi Minh City, Vietnam
- Genres: Acrobatic Gymnastics Act, model, golf coach (Quoc Nghiep)
- Members: Giang Quoc Co (born 1984); Giang Quoc Nghiep (born 1989)

The Giang Brothers, Giang Quốc Cơ (born 1984) and Giang Quốc Nghiệp (born 1989), are acrobats from Ho Chi Minh City, Vietnam. Currently, they are trying their hand as model. Meanwhile, Quoc Nghiep has been passionate about golf for a long time. He wants to play golf and aims to become a golf coach.

== Guinness World Records ==
They are best known for their balancing act – with Nghiep balancing vertically atop his brother's head. Together, they hold two Guinness World Records:

1. Most consecutive stairs climbed while balancing a person on the head: 90 stairs; achieved on January 10, 2017, at Girona Cathedral, Spain (breaking the record of Tang Tao and Su Zengxian (China) of 25 stairs in 2014).

2. Fastest time to descend and ascend ten stairs while balancing a person on the head (blindfolded): 53.97 sec on December 31, 2018, at La Notte dei Record (The Night of Records), TV8, Italia (Set a new record)

== Career ==
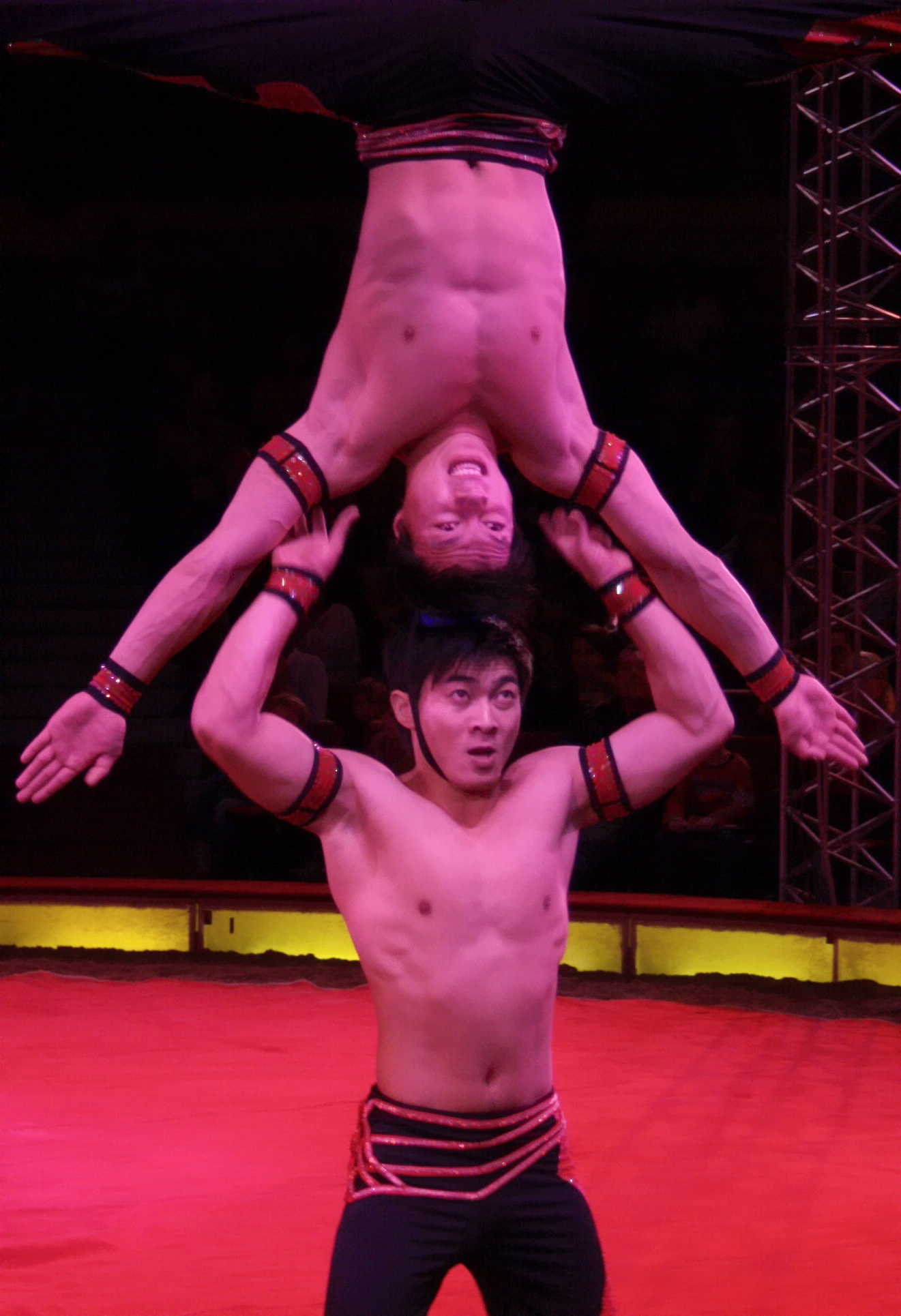
Giang Brothers are the youngest Merited Artist of Vietnam recipients

They reached the finals of series 12 of Britain's Got Talent on June 3, 2018, finishing in fifth place.

The Giang Brothers are the youngest artists awarded the Merited Artist title in Vietnam. Giang Quoc Co received the award at the age of 28 while Giang Quoc Nghiep received it at the age of 26.

== Personal life ==
Giang Quoc Co married Hong Phuong, a journalist and MC for Ho Chi Minh City Television, in 2016 and they have one son and one daughter. Giang Quoc Nghiep has two children (a son and a daughter) with Ngoc Mai, a singer and lecturer at the Conservatory of Ho Chi Minh City.

== See also ==
- Britain's Got Talent (series 12)
- Merited Artist of Vietnam
