= Thornhill =

Thornhill may refer to:

== People ==
- Thornhill (surname)

== Artists ==
- Thornhill (band)

== Places ==
=== Canada ===
- Thornhill, British Columbia
- Thornhill, Maple Ridge, British Columbia
- Thornhill, Nova Scotia
- Thornhill, Ontario
  - Thornhill (federal electoral district)
  - Thornhill (provincial electoral district)
  - Markham—Thornhill (electoral district)

=== South Africa ===
- Thornhill, Kouga, Eastern Cape
- Thornhill, Enoch Mgijima, Eastern Cape

=== United Kingdom ===
- Thornhill, Cardiff, Wales
- Thornhill, Cumbria, England
- Thornhill, Derbyshire, England
- Thornhill, Dumfries and Galloway, Scotland
- Thornhill, Southampton, England
- Thornhill, Stirling, Scotland
- Thornhill, Torfaen, Cwmbran, Wales
- Thornhill, West Yorkshire, England
  - Thornhill Trojans, amateur rugby league club, Thornhill, West Yorkshire
- Thornhill, Wiltshire, England
- Thornhill Lees, Dewsbury, West Yorkshire, England

=== United States ===
- Thornhill (Forkland, Alabama), a historic plantation listed on the National Register of Historic Places
- Thornhill (Talladega, Alabama), a historic plantation listed on the National Register of Historic Places
- Thornhill, Kentucky

=== Zimbabwe ===
- Gweru-Thornhill Air Base, formerly Rhodesian Air Force Station Thornhill

== Other uses ==
- Thornhill (album), 1999 Moxy Früvous album
- Thornhill was the name of a play that John Cassavetes and others were developing in 1983, about Eugene O'Neill
- Thornhill College, Derry, Northern Ireland
- Thornhill Academy, Sunderland, England
- Thornhill Community Academy, West Yorkshire, England
- Thornhill Secondary School, Ontario, Canada

== See also ==
- Thorn Hill, a historic home located near Lexington, Rockbridge County, Virginia
- Thorn Hill, Tennessee
