= America's Got Talent season 10 =

America's Got Talent
- Season 10
- Promotional poster for season 10, featuring (L to R) judges Mandel, Mel B, Stern, Klum, and host Cannon
- Showrunners: Jason Raff; Sam Donnelly
- Hosted by: Nick Cannon
- Judges: Howard Stern; Mel B; Heidi Klum; Howie Mandel
- Winner: Paul Zerdin
- Runner-up: Drew Lynch
- Finals venue: Radio City Music Hall
- No. of episodes: 27

Release
- Original network: NBC
- Original release: May 26 – September 16, 2015

Season chronology
- ← Previous; Season 9 Next → Season 11

Judges and Host for America's Got Talent Season 10

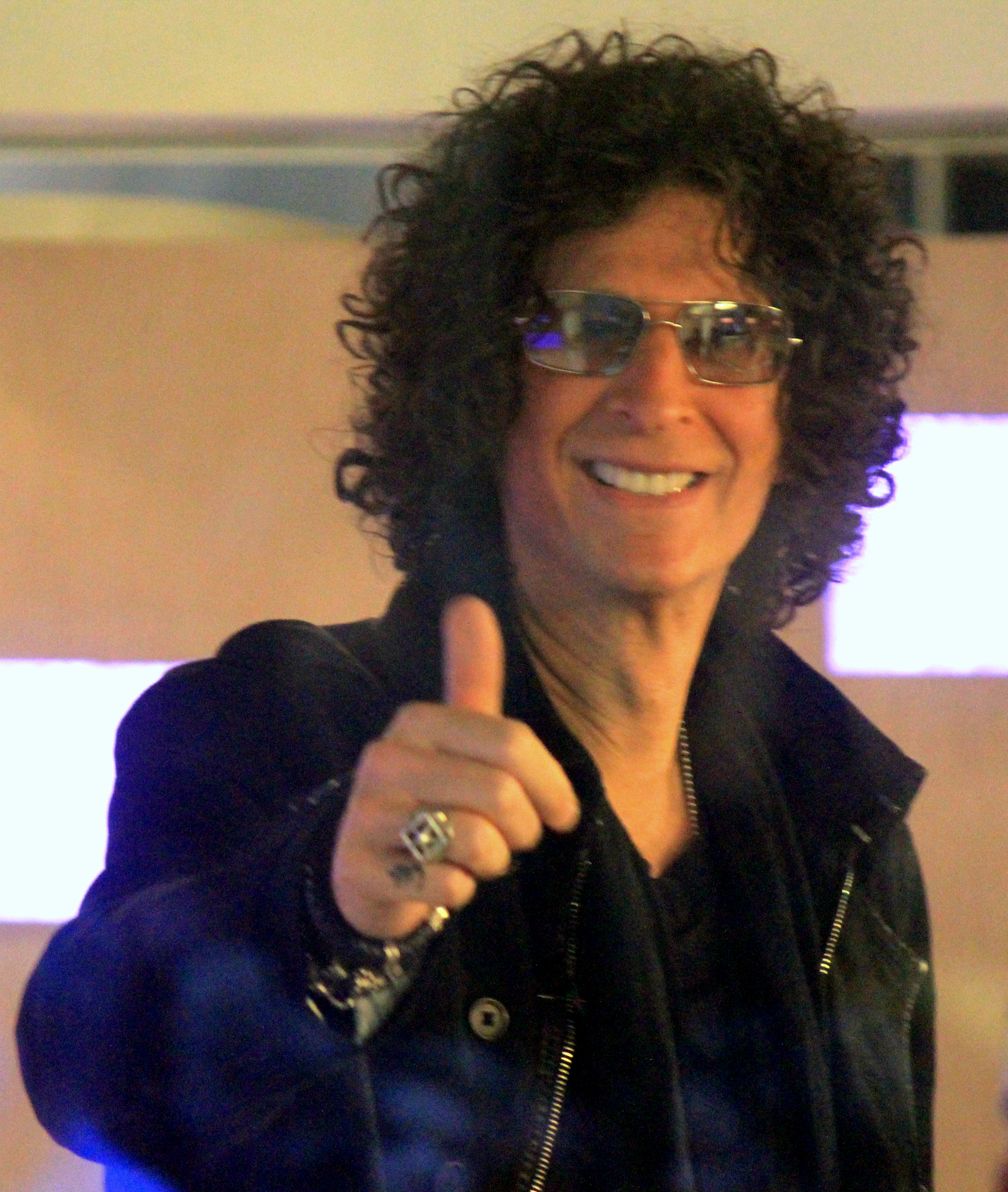
Howard Stern

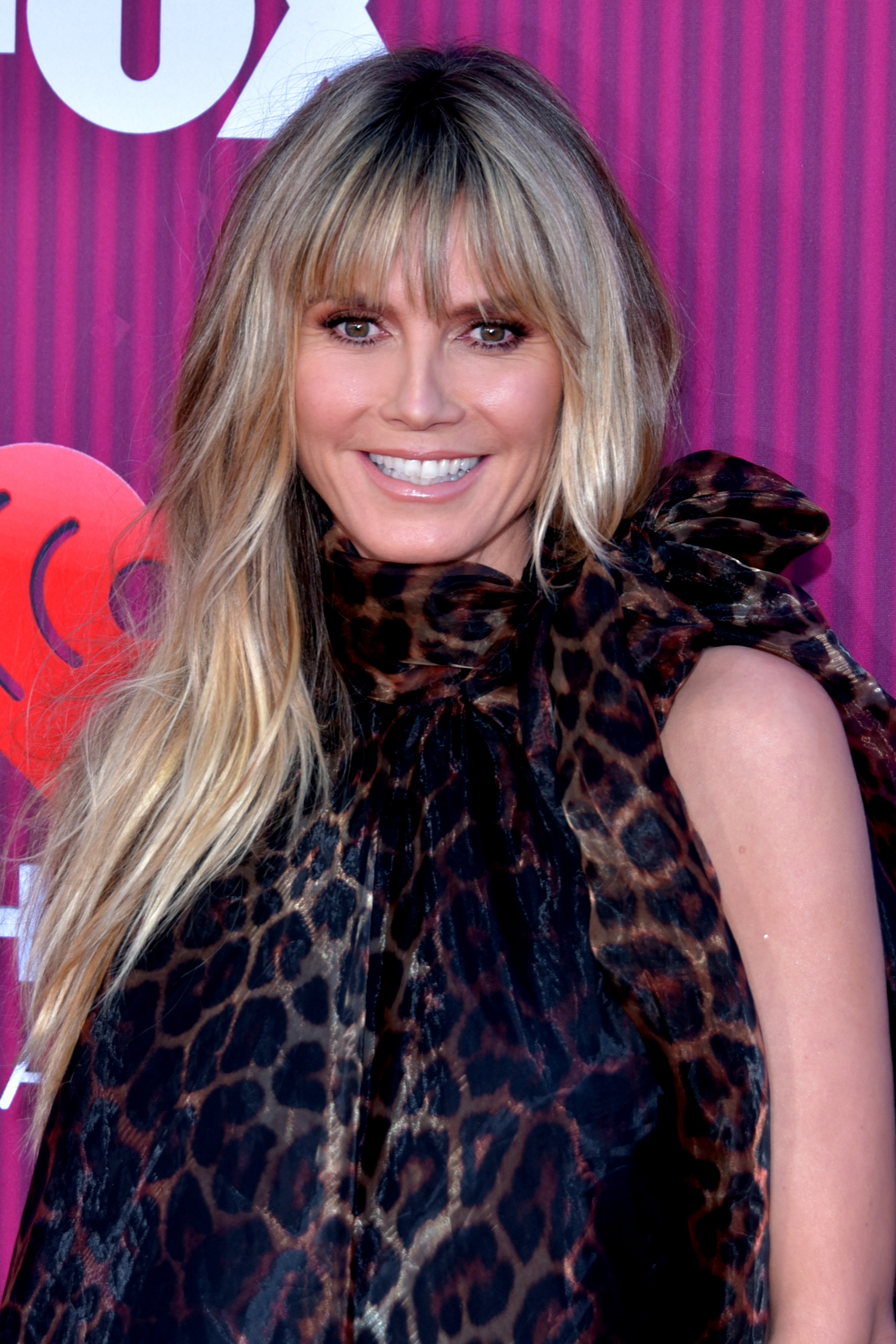
Heidi Klum

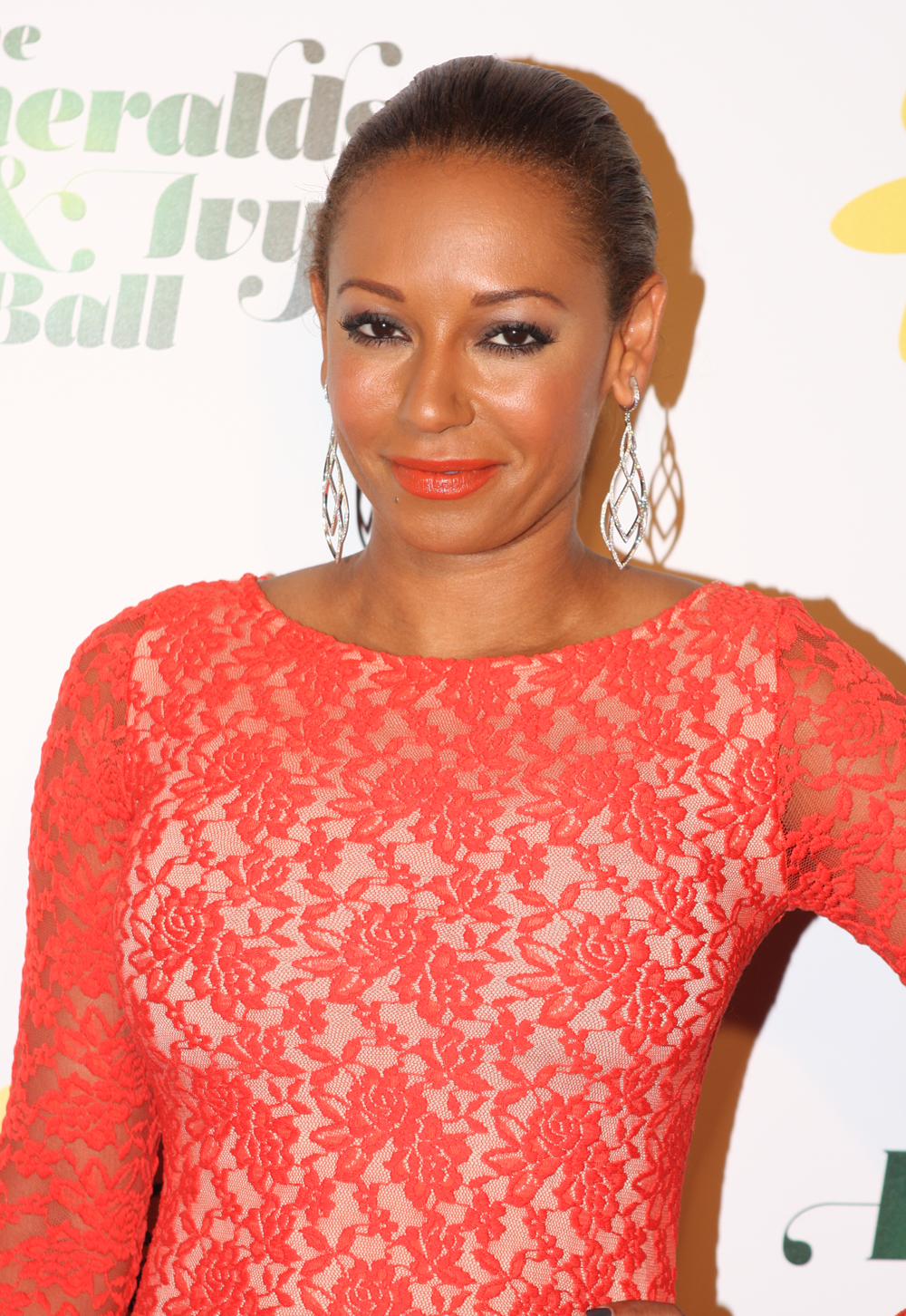
Mel B

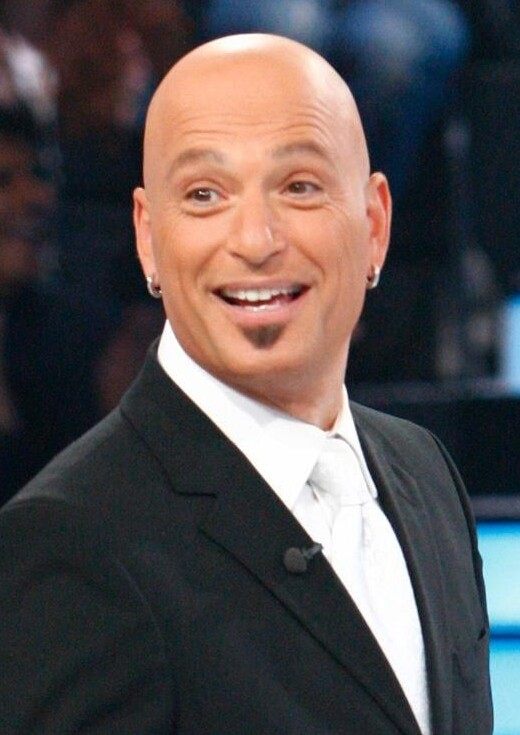
Howie Mandel

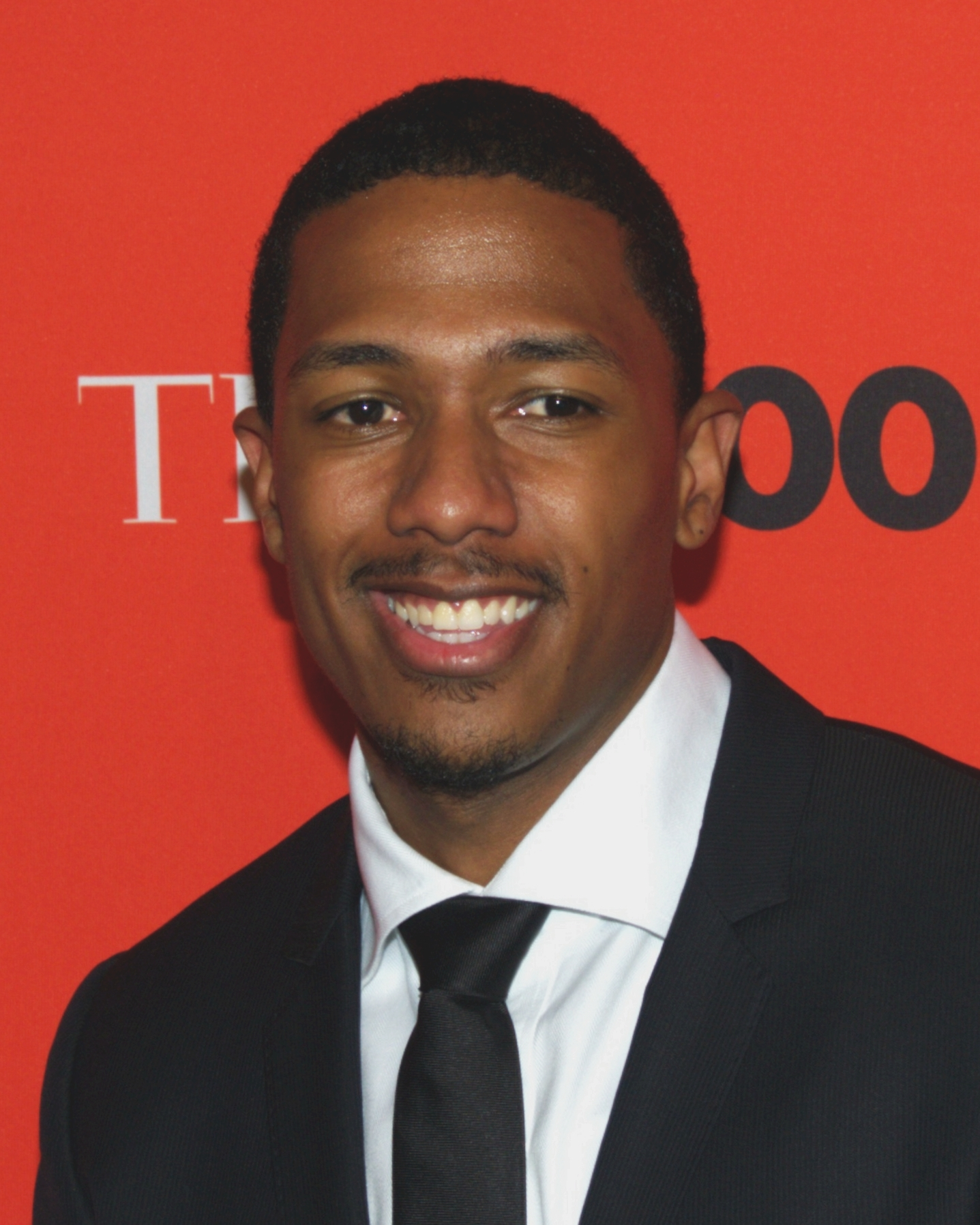
Nick Cannon

The tenth season of American talent show competition series America's Got Talent was broadcast on NBC from May 26 to September 16, 2015. After the previous season, the format of the second round of auditions was changed to a more competitive stage under the title "Judge Cuts", with each episode under this new arrangement featuring a guest judge. For the first use of the format, the guest judges included Neil Patrick Harris, Michael Bublé, Marlon Wayans, and Piers Morgan.

Other changes included the "Golden Buzzer" format that was introduced in the previous season to match the arrangement used across the Got Talent franchise, and minor adjustments to the Wildcard format. The online public voting system was also amended, by renaming it to coincide with the program's newest sponsor for the year. As the program was entering its tenth year of broadcast, two specials were produced to celebrate ten years of America's Got Talent and Got Talent respectively. The first, "10 Years of Talent", aired on July 29, 2015. The second, "World's Got Talent", aired on August 5, 2015.

The tenth season was won by ventriloquist Paul Zerdin, with comedian Drew Lynch finishing in second, and mentalist Oz Pearlman placing third. During its broadcast, the season averaged around 10.28 million viewers.

== Season overview ==
Open auditions began in late 2014, between November and December in the cities of Tampa, Nashville, Richmond (New York), Chicago, St. Louis, San Antonio, Albuquerque, San Francisco, Seattle, Boise, Los Angeles, and Las Vegas. Online auditions were also accepted. Judges' auditions took place in the same venues as last year, between March and May 2015, with a special session for extreme performances held at a venue in Pomona, California. With the program entering its tenth year, special compilation episodes were incorporated to celebrate the wide range of talent which had appeared on America's Got Talent and within the Got Talent franchise. They included some of the best acts, the most heartwarming stories, the oddest personalities, and the biggest show-stopping moments from the last 10 years. Updates on what some of these acts were currently doing were also shown, along with notable changes to the format of the program for the tenth season.

The second round of auditions changed to a live audience format titled "Judge Cuts". Held at a fixed venue, the new format had participants being divided into groups, with each group's participants required to each conduct a new performance before the judges. Along with a guest judge for each group, acts could only secure a place in the live rounds if they gained a majority vote from the panel. Judge Cuts operated on a similar arrangement to the Judges' auditions. The main judges could stop a performance with their buzzers, the panel could give feedback on a performance once it had ended, and filming of this stage included recordings of the host in the wings of the venue's stage. As the new stage would be held over several weeks (rather than a single week), the broadcast schedule of the program had to be altered, leading to the number of quarter-finals being reduced as a result. That effectively decreased the number of quarter-finalists the competition would have. The first use of the format had the involvement of some celebrities: actor Neil Patrick Harris, singer Michael Bublé, actor Marlon Wayans, and former AGT judge Piers Morgan.

Another change brought in was the format of the "Golden Buzzer", to coincide with the other editions of Got Talent. The use of the buzzer would allow any participant receiving it to be granted an automatic place in the live rounds, which took into consideration the new audition stage being introduced. While the main judges could only use the buzzer in the first stage, the guest judges could only use it during the second stage for a participant within the group they each oversaw. The Wildcard format from previous seasons was also changed. The judges would pick Wildcard quarter-finalists from any three participants eliminated in the Judge Cuts, regardless of whether the act was televised or not, as well as a single Wildcard semi-finalist from any participant eliminated in the quarter-finals. The online public voting system was also changed, not only in its name to reflect the change of sponsor for America's Got Talent for 2015, but also in allowing the public to vote between the participants in each quarter-final (those who placed 6th, 7th and 8th in the main public vote respectively) for a place in the semi-finals. While the judges voted on which of the two they didn't select for a final place in the next stage, the system for the semi-finals operated the same as before, but it was dropped entirely from being used in the finals. Prior to the start of the live rounds, two participants were forced to withdraw, one of whom had another engagement that would have conflicted with their involvement in the competition (leading to them being replaced by acts that had originally been eliminated in the Judge Cuts).

Thirty-six of the participants who auditioned for this season secured a place in the live quarter-finals, with twelve quarter-finalists performing in each show. These included comedian Drew Lynch, contemporary dance duo Freckled Sky, gospel singer Sharon Irving and classical singer Arielle Baril, who had each received a golden buzzer from the main judges; magician Piff the Magic Dragon, singing duet The Craig Lewis Band, ventriloquist Paul Zerdin, and Japanese light-and-sound dance troupe Siro-A, who had each received a golden buzzer from the guest judges; acrobatic dance duo Craig & Micheline, flyboarder Damone Rippy and gymnastic team Showproject, who were chosen as Wild Card quarter-finalists. About twenty-two quarter-finalists advanced and were split between the two semi-finals, including motocross team Metal Mulisha Fitz Army chosen as the Wildcard semi-finalist, with ten semi-finalists securing a place in the finals. Here are the results of each participant's overall performance in the season:

Winner | Runner-up | Third place | Finalist | Semi-finalist
Quarter-finalist | Wildcard Quarter-finalist | Wildcard Semi-finalist
Golden Buzzer - Auditions | Golden Buzzer - Judge Cuts

Participant	Age(s) ^{1}	Genre	Act	From	Quarter-Final	Result
3 Shades of Blue	19–20	Singing / Music	Band	Philadelphia	2	Semi-finalist
Alicia Michilli	23	Singing	Singer	Detroit	3	Semi-finalist
Alondra Santos ^{3}	13	Singing	Mariachi Singer	El Monte, California	1	Semi-finalist
Animation Crew	25–33	Dance	Dance Group	South Korea	2	Eliminated
Arielle Baril	11	Singing	Opera Singer	Drexel Hill, Pennsylvania	2	Semi-finalist
Benjamin Yonattan	14	Dance	Dancer	Kalamazoo, Michigan	3	Eliminated
Benton Blount	35	Singing	Singer & Guitarist	North Carolina now Greenville, South Carolina	1	Finalist
Chapkis Dance Family	14–35	Dance	Dance Group	Suisun City, California	3	Eliminated
Craig & Micheline	—N/a ^{2}	Dance / Acrobatics	Dance Duo	South Africa	1	Eliminated
DADitude! ^{3}	42–55	Dance	Dance Group	Los Angeles	3	Eliminated
Damone Rippy	16	Danger	Flyboarder	Austin, Texas	2	Eliminated
Daniella Mass	22	Singing	Opera Singer	Barranquilla, Colombia	3	Semi-finalist
Derek Hughes	43	Comedy / Magic	Comic Magician	Los Angeles	2	Finalist
DM Nation	14–29	Dance	Dance Group	Lévis, Canada	2	Eliminated
Drew Lynch	23	Comedy	Comedian	Las Vegas	1	Runner-up
Freckled Sky	20 & 28	Dance	Dance Duo	Chicago	2	Eliminated
Freelusion	27–29	Dance	Videmapping Act	Hungary	3	Semi-finalist
Gary Vider	31	Comedy	Comedian	New York City	3	Finalist
Ira	—N/a ^{4}	Singing	Singing Puppet	Los Angeles ^{4}	2	Semi-finalist
Metal Mulisha Fitz Army	25–30	Danger	Motocross Team	Omaha, Nebraska	3	Semi-finalist
Mountain Faith Band	19–51	Music	Bluegrass Band	Sylva, North Carolina	3	Semi-finalist
Myq Kaplan	36	Comedy	Comedian	New York City	2	Eliminated
Oz Pearlman	32	Magic	Mentalist	New York City	3	Third place
Paul Zerdin	42	Comedy	Ventriloquist	London	1	Winner
Piff the Magic Dragon	34	Magic / Comedy	Magician	London, United Kingdom	1	Finalist
Samantha Johnson	26	Singing	Singer	New Bedford, Massachusetts	1	Semi-finalist
Selected of God	21–52	Singing	Gospel Choir	Detroit	3	Eliminated
Sharon Irving	29	Singing	Gospel Singer	Chicago	2	Semi-finalist
Showproject	21–33	Acrobatics	Gymnastics Team	Armenia, Czech Republic & Germany ^{6}	1	Eliminated
Siro-A	23–36	Dance	Dance Group	Sendai, Japan	1	Semi-finalist
The CraigLewis Band	30 & 33	Singing	Singing Duo	Atlanta	2	Grand-finalist
The Gentlemen	9 & 12	Dance	Dance Duo	Fairfield, California	1	Eliminated
The Professional Regurgitator	52	Danger	Regurgitator	Glasgow, Scotland	3	Grand-finalist
Triple Threat	21	Singing	Singing Trio	Benton, Arkansas	1	Eliminated
Uzeyer Novruzov	39	Acrobatics / Danger	Ladder Acrobat	Eysk, Russia	2	Finalist
Vita Radionova	33	Acrobatics	Contortionist	Ukraine	1	Eliminated

- ^1 Ages denoted for a participant(s), pertain to their final performance for this season.
- ^2 The ages of Craig & Micheline were not disclosed on the program.
- ^3 These participants were replacements for those who withdrew from the competition, despite securing a place in the live rounds.
- ^4 No actual information on the puppeteer for this act was disclosed by the show, other than the location they came from.
- ^5 For health and safety reasons, Metal Mulisha Fitz Army live round performances were pre-recorded at another site.
- ^6 Locations denote where members of this group came from.

=== Quarter-finals summary ===
Buzzed Out | Judges' choice | Advanced to Semi-finals
Won Online Public Vote | Won Judges' Vote | Lost Judges' Vote

==== Quarter-final 1 (August 11) ====
Guest Performers, Results Show: The Rockettes, Mat Franco, and OMI

Quarter-Finalist	Order	Buzzes and Judges' votes				Result (August 12)
Quarter-Finalist	Order	Mandel	Mel B	Klum	Stern	Result (August 12)
Siro-A	1					Advanced
Alondra Santos	2					Advanced (Won Judges' Vote)
Vita Radionova	3					Eliminated
Triple Threat	4					Eliminated
The Gentlemen	5					Eliminated (Lost Judges' Vote)
Piff the Magic Dragon	6					Advanced
Benton Blount	7					Advanced
Craig & Micheline	8					Eliminated
Drew Lynch	9					Advanced
Showproject	10					Eliminated
Paul Zerdin	11					Advanced
Samantha Johnson	12					Advanced (Online Public Vote)

==== Quarter-final 2 (August 18) ====
Guest Performers, Results Show: Emily West, and William Close

Quarter-Finalist	Order	Buzzes and Judges' votes				Result (August 19)
Quarter-Finalist	Order	Mandel	Mel B	Klum	Stern	Result (August 19)
DM Nation	1					Eliminated
Derek Hughes	2					Advanced
3 Shades of Blue	3			^{7}		Advanced (Won Judges' Vote)
Animation Crew	4					Eliminated
Arielle Baril	5					Advanced
Uzeyer Novruzov	6					Advanced
Ira	7					Advanced (Online Public Vote)
Damone Rippy ^{8}	8					Eliminated
Myq Kaplan	9					Eliminated
The CraigLewis Band	10					Advanced
Freckled Sky	11			^{7}		Eliminated (Lost Judges' Vote)
Sharon Irving	12					Advanced

- ^7 Due to the majority vote for 3 Shades of Blue, Klum's voting intention was not revealed.
- ^8 For health & safety reasons, Damone Rippy's performance had to be pre-recorded at another site.

==== Quarter-final 3 (August 25) ====
Guest Performers, Results Show: Cast of Le Rêve

Quarter-Finalist	Order	Buzzes and Judges' votes				Result (August 26)
Quarter-Finalist	Order	Mandel	Mel B	Klum	Stern	Result (August 26)
Chapkis Dance Family	1					Eliminated
Metal Mulisha Fitz Army ^{9}	2					Eliminated
DADitude!	3					Eliminated
Alicia Michilli	4					Advanced
Gary Vider	5					Advanced (Online Public Vote)
Mountain Faith Band	6					Advanced
Oz Pearlman	7					Advanced
Selected of God	8					Eliminated
The Professional Regurgitator	9					Advanced
Benjamin Yonattan	10					Eliminated (Lost Judges' Vote)
Daniella Mass	11					Advanced (Won Judges' Vote)
Freelusion	12					Advanced

- ^9 Metal Mulisha Fitz Army were later appointed the judges' WildCard semi-finalist.

=== Semi-finals summary ===
Buzzed Out | Judges' choice | Advanced to Finals
Won Online Public Vote | Won Judges' Vote | Lost Judges' Vote

==== Semi-final 1 (September 1) ====
Guest Performers, Results Show: The Illusionists, Taylor Williamson

Semi-Finalist	Order	Buzzes and Judges' votes				Result (September 2)
Semi-Finalist	Order	Mandel	Mel B	Klum	Stern	Result (September 2)
Ira	1					Eliminated
Mountain Faith Band	2					Eliminated
Metal Mulisha Fitz Army	3					Eliminated
Samantha Johnson	4					Eliminated (Judges' Vote Tied - Lost by Public Vote)
Derek Hughes	5					Advanced
Drew Lynch	6					Advanced
The CraigLewis Band	7					Advanced (Judges' Vote Tied - Won by Public Vote)
Oz Pearlman	8					Advanced
Benton Blount	9					Advanced (Online Public Vote)
Siro-A	10					Eliminated
Arielle Baril	11					Eliminated

==== Semi-final 2 (September 8) ====
Guest Performers, Results Show: Little Mix, and AcroArmy

Semi-Finalist	Order	Buzzes and Judges' votes				Result (September 9)
Semi-Finalist	Order	Mandel	Mel B	Klum	Stern	Result (September 9)
3 Shades of Blue	1					Eliminated
Gary Vider	2					Advanced (Judges' Vote Tied - Won by Public Vote)
Alondra Santos	3					Eliminated
Freelusion	4					Eliminated (Judges' Vote Tied - Lost by Public Vote)
Alicia Michilli	5					Eliminated
Piff the Magic Dragon	6					Advanced
Daniella Mass	7					Eliminated
Uzeyer Novruzov	8					Advanced (Online Public Vote)
The Professional Regurgitator	9					Advanced
Sharon Irving	10					Eliminated
Paul Zerdin	11					Advanced

=== Finals (September 15–16) ===
Guest Performers, Performance show: The Rockettes, Flo Rida

Winner | Runner-up | 3rd place | Top 5

Finalist	Performed with (2nd Performance)	Result (September 16)
Benton Blount	Rachel Platten	Finalist
Derek Hughes	Penn & Teller and Mat Franco ^{10}	Finalist
Drew Lynch	Jeff Ross ^{12}	2nd
Gary Vider	Jeff Ross ^{12}	Finalist
Oz Pearlman	Penn & Teller and Mat Franco ^{10}	3rd
Paul Zerdin	Terry Fator	1st
Piff the Magic Dragon	Penn & Teller and Mat Franco ^{10}	Finalist
The Craig Lewis Band	Yolanda Adams, and Harlem Gospel Choir	Grand-finalist
The Professional Regurgitator	Penn & Teller	Grand-finalist
Uzeyer Novruzov	Freelusion ^{11}	Finalist

- ^10 Oz Pearlman, Piff the Magic Dragon and Derek Hughes conducted a joint routine for their second performance, and thus shared the same guest performers.
- ^11 Although they lost in the semi-finals, Freelusion were given a special invite to conduct a joint routine with Uzeyer Novruzov for his second performance.
- ^12 Drew Lynch and Gary Vider conducted a joint routine for their second performance, and thus shared the same guest performers.

== Ratings ==
The following ratings are based upon those published by Nielsen Media Research after this season's broadcast:

Show	Episode title	First air date	Rating (18–49)	Share (18–49)	Viewers (millions)	Time slot rank	Nightly rank	Weekly rank
1	Auditions Week 1	May 26, 2015	2.6	9	11.09	1	1	1
2	Auditions Week 2	June 2, 2015	2.4	9	10.84	1	1	3
3	Auditions Week 3	June 9, 2015	2.3	8	10.44	2	2	4
4	Auditions Week 4	June 16, 2015	2.3	8	10.18	1	2	4
5	Auditions Week 5	June 23, 2015	2.6	10	11.08	1	1	1
6	Auditions Week 6	June 30, 2015	2.5	9	10.74	2	2	3
7	Auditions Week 7	July 7, 2015	2.3	8	10.57	1	1	1
8	Judge Cuts Week 1	July 14, 2015	2.4	9	10.82	1	2	2
9	Judge Cuts Week 2	July 21, 2015	2.3	9	10.50	1	1	1
10	Judge Cuts Week 3	July 28, 2015	2.1	8	10.33	1	1	3
11	Judge Cuts Week 4	August 4, 2015	2.2	8	10.21	1	1	3
12	Quarterfinals Week 1 (Performances)	August 11, 2015	2.5	9	11.43	1	1	1
13	Quarterfinals Week 1 (Results)	August 12, 2015	1.6	6	8.83	2	2	6
14	Quarterfinals Week 2 (Performances)	August 18, 2015	2.3	8	10.86	1	1	1
15	Quarterfinals Week 2 (Results)	August 19, 2015	1.6	6	9.12	2	2	7
16	Quarterfinals Week 3 (Performances)	August 25, 2015	2.2	8	10.34	1	1	2
17	Quarterfinals Week 3 (Results)	August 26, 2015	1.6	6	8.46	2	2	7
18	Semifinals Week 1 (Performances)	September 1, 2015	2.3	8	10.55	1	1	2
19	Semifinals Week 1 (Results)	September 2, 2015	1.7	7	9.29	2	2	6
20	Semifinals Week 2 (Performances)	September 8, 2015	2.1	7	10.53	1	1	9
21	Semifinals Week 2 (Results)	September 9, 2015	1.8	7	9.46	2	2	12
22	Finals (Performances)	September 15, 2015	2.4	9	11.33	1	1	6
23	Finale	September 16, 2015	2.1	7	9.54	1	1	9

Specials

Show	Episode title	First air date	Rating (18–49)	Share (18–49)	Viewers (millions)	Time slot rank	Nightly rank	Weekly rank
S1	Best of Season 10 Auditions	July 22, 2015	1.2	5	5.66	3	4	12
S2	10 Years of Talent	July 29, 2015	1.6	6	5.80	2	2	8
S3	World's Got Talent	August 5, 2015	1.5	6	6.99	2	2	9
S4	Finale Performance Recap	September 16, 2015	1.2	4	5.65	3	4	19
