= Britain's Got Talent series 12 =

British talent competition series

Britain's Got Talent
- Series 12
- Presented by: Ant McPartlin (ITV; auditions); Dec Donnelly (ITV); Stephen Mulhern (ITV2)
- Judges: David Walliams; Alesha Dixon; Amanda Holden; Simon Cowell
- Winner: Lost Voice Guy
- Runner-up: Robert White

Release
- Original network: ITV
- Original release: 14 April – 3 June 2018

Series chronology
- ← Previous; Series 11 Next → Series 13

Judges and Presenter(s) for Britain's Got Talent Series 12

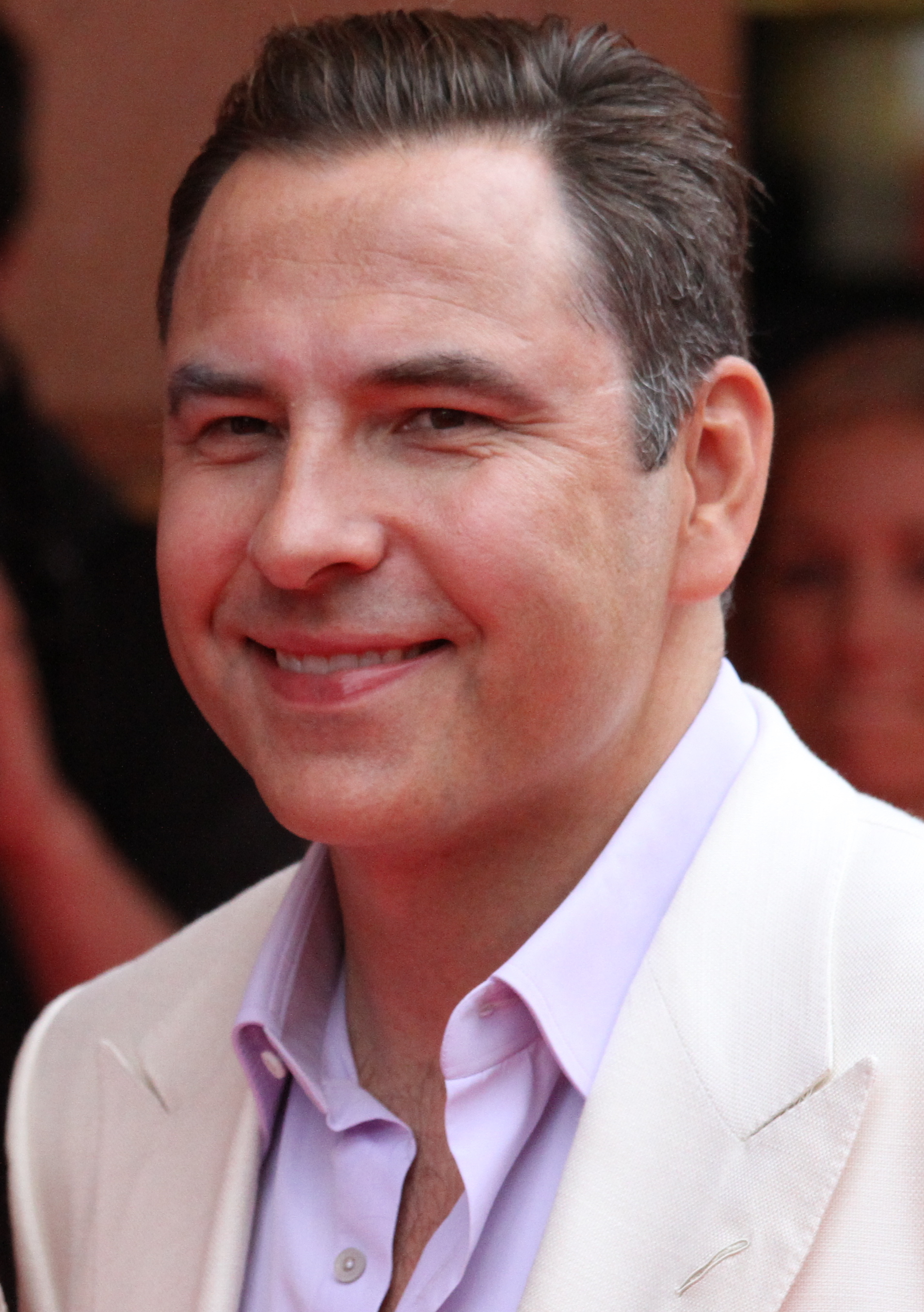
David Walliams

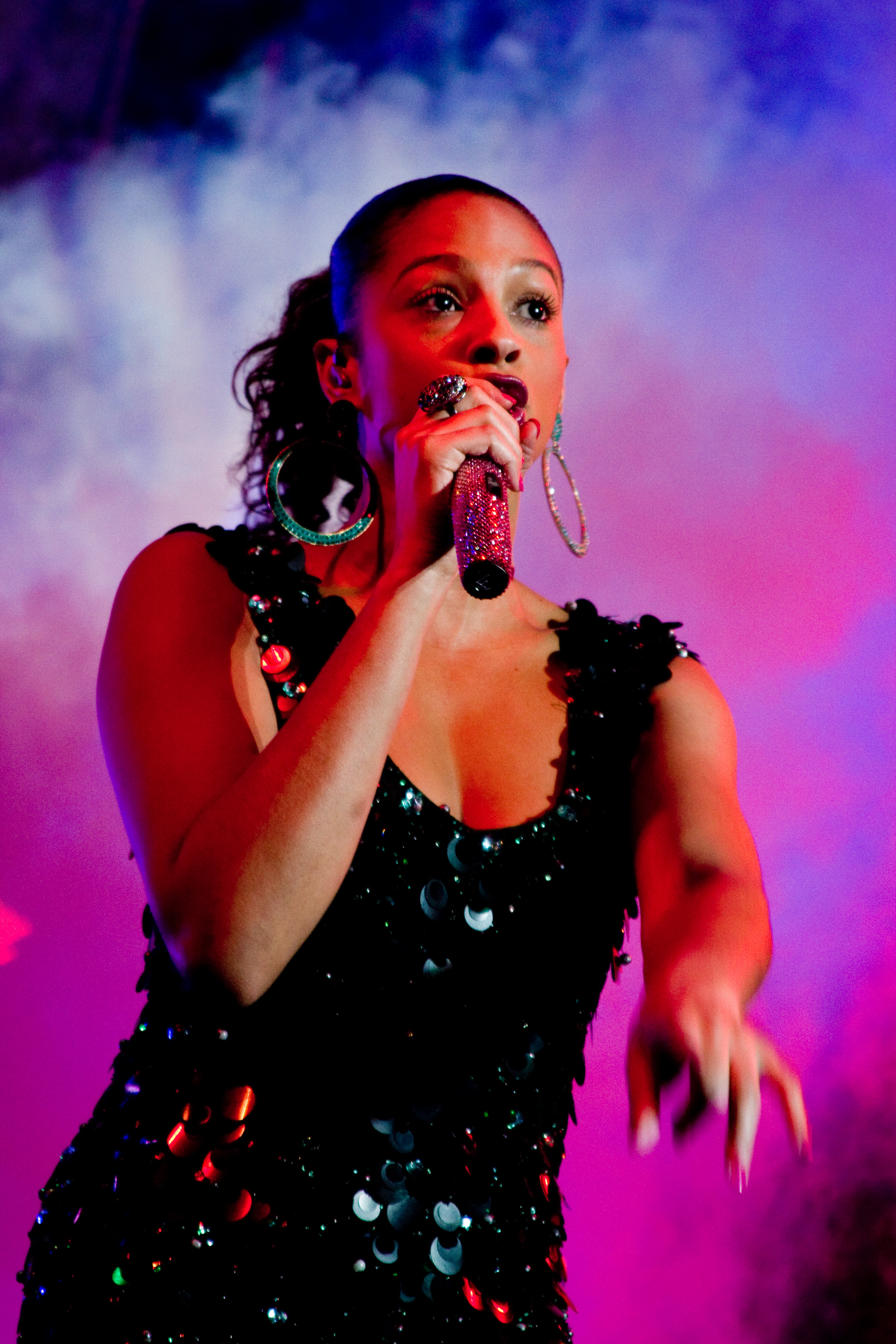
Alesha Dixon

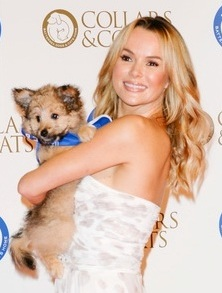
Amanda Holden

Simon Cowell

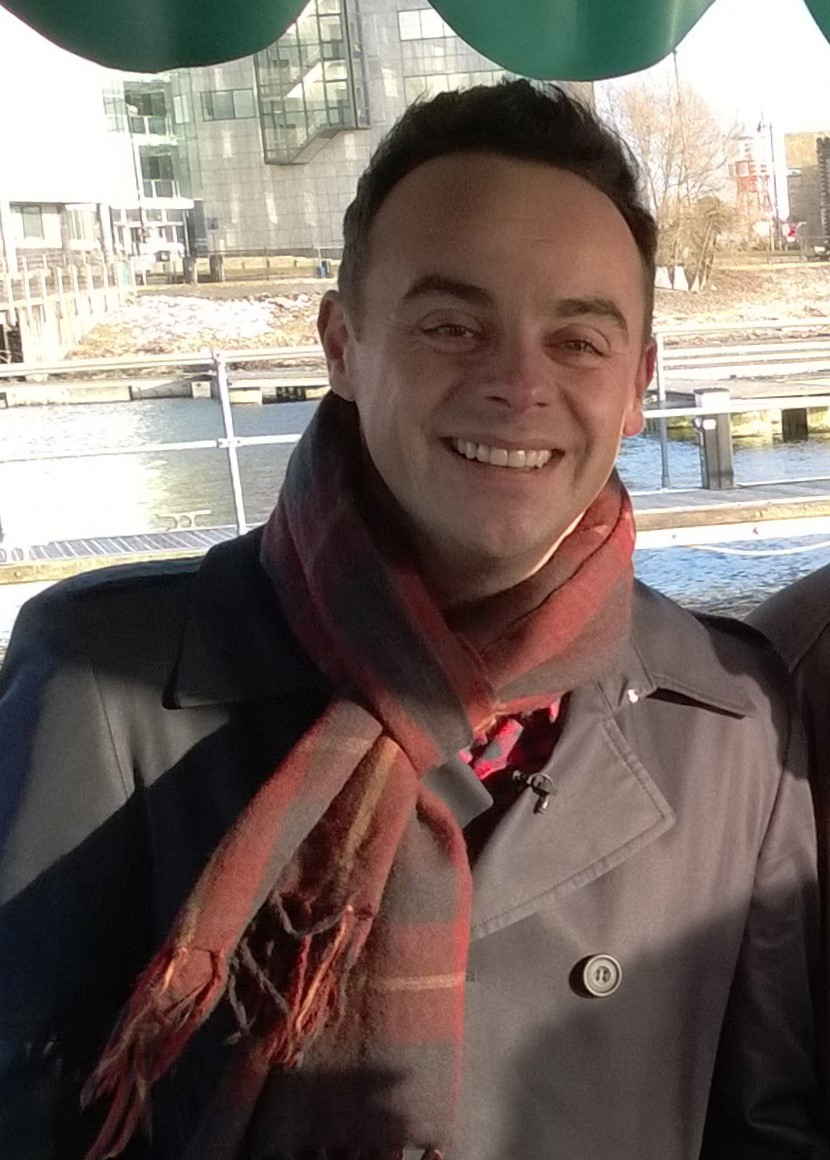
Ant McPartlin (ITV1, Auditions Only)

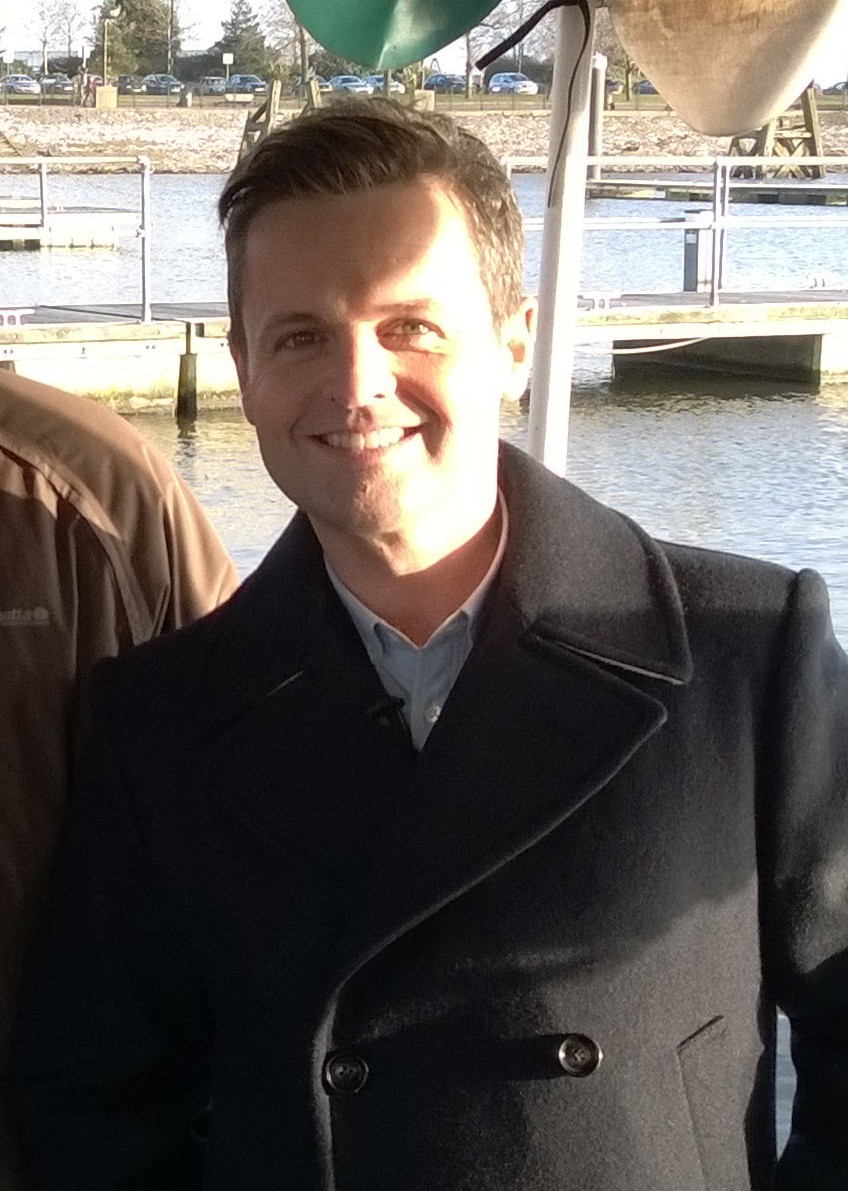
Declan Donnelly (ITV1)

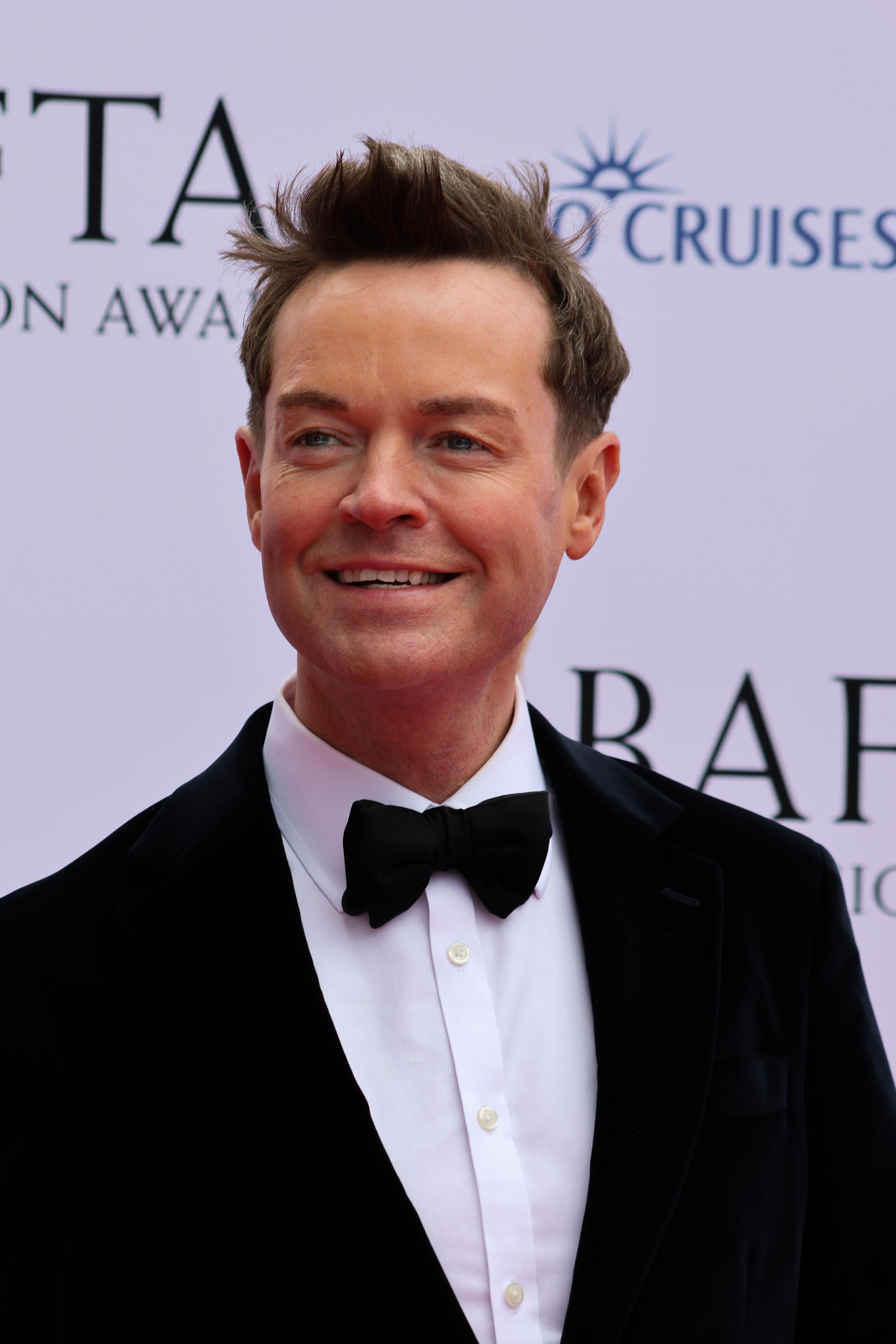
Stephen Mulhern (ITV2)

The twelfth series of British talent competition programme Britain's Got Talent was broadcast on ITV, from 14 April to 3 June 2018. For this series, the live episodes were broadcast from Hammersmith Apollo, and presented by Dec Donnelly only; while Ant McPartlin suspended his TV commitments on 19 March 2018, he still appeared in the audition episodes as these had already been filmed in January and February earlier that year. Compared to previous years, this series featured a higher number of participants for the judges to select semi-finalists from, not counting those who received the Golden Buzzer, and saw the return of the Judges' Vote to the show's format.

The twelfth series was won by stand-up comedian Lost Voice Guy, with comic singer & pianist Robert White finishing in second place and singer Donchez Dacres third. During its broadcast, the series averaged 8.34 million viewers.

== Series overview ==
Open auditions were held the previous year between October and December, before the Judges' auditions took place between January and February 2018, within the cities of Blackpool, London and Manchester. This series is notable for the absence of Anthony McPartlin in the live episodes, after he stepped down from his TV commitments in the aftermath of a traffic accident on 18 March 2018 that he was involved in. While McPartlin still appeared during audition episodes on both Britain's Got Talent and Britain's Got More Talent, as these had already been filmed prior to the start of the series' broadcast, his colleague Declan Donnelly chose to present the live episodes without him, in the wake of his colleague's decision.

This series saw a far higher number of participants making it through the first stage of auditions, than had been recorded in previous years - in addition to those receiving the Golden Buzzer, around 182 acts successfully reached the second stage. Following the eleventh series, the judges' vote was brought back for the semi-finals, after Cowell admitted in June 2017 that he disliked its removal from the show's format. Disruptions caused by bad weather resulted in the first live semi-final being taken off the air for a brief time, following the first performance, while a stage invader attempted to disrupt proceedings during the broadcast of the second live semi-final.

Of the participants that took part, only forty made it into the five live semi-finals - of these acts, reggae singer Donchez Dacres, opera singer Gruffydd Wyn Roberts, singer-guitarists duo Jack & Tim, singer Lifford Shillingford, and magician Marc Spelmann, each received a golden buzzer during their auditions - with eight appearing in each one, and eleven of these acts making it into the live final; the wildcard act chosen by the judges was B Positive Choir, after they lost out in the tied Judges' vote in the second semi-final. The following below lists the results of each participant's overall performance in this series:

Winner | Runner-up | Finalist | Semi-finalist
Judges' Wildcard Finalist | Golden Buzzer Audition

Participant	Age(s) ^{1}	Genre	Performance Type	Semi-final	Result
Acrocadabra ^{2}	9–17	Acrobatics	Acrobatic Group	3	Eliminated
Aleksandar Mileusnić	23	Singing	Swing Singer	3	Eliminated
Amy Marie Borg	16	Singing	Opera Singer	4	Eliminated
Andrew Lancaster	32	Comedy	Impressionist	2	Eliminated
B Positive Choir	22–62	Singing	Choir	2	Finalist
Baba Yega	21–33	Dance	Dance Group	4	Eliminated
Bring It North ^{2}	10–11	Singing	Boy Band	5	Eliminated
Cali Swing	9–14	Dance	Salsa Dance Group	1	Eliminated
Calum Courtney	10	Singing	Singer	2	Finalist
DeMille & Muoneké ^{2}	22 & 51	Singing	Jazz Singing Duo	5	Eliminated
DMU Gospel Choir	16–55	Singing	Gospel Choir	3	Eliminated
Donchez Dacres	60	Singing	Reggae Singer	2	Third Place
DVJ	10–18	Dance	Street Dance Group	4	Finalist
Ellie & Jeki	29 & 34	Magic	Quick Change Duo	1	Eliminated
Father Ray Kelly	64	Singing	Singer	5	Eliminated
Futunity	8–24	Dance	Dance Group	2	Eliminated
Giang Brothers	29–33	Acrobatics	Hand Balancing Duo	5	Finalist
Gruffydd Wyn Roberts	22	Singing	Opera Singer	3	Finalist
Jack & Tim	12 & 43	Singing / Music	Singing & Guitarist Duo	4	Finalist
Lexie & Christopher	10 & 10	Dance	Ballroom Dance Duo	5	Eliminated
Lifford Shillingford	42	Singing	Singer	1	Eliminated
Lost Voice Guy	37	Comedy	Stand Up Comedian	1	Winner
Maddox Dixon	31	Magic	Close Up Magician	1	Eliminated
Magus Utopia	24–40	Magic	Magic Group	2	Eliminated
Mandy Muden	55	Comedy / Magic	Comic Magician	5	Eliminated
Marc Spelmann	46	Magic	Magician	3	Eliminated
Marty Putz	55	Comedy	Comedian & Inventor	4	Eliminated
Matt Johnson	43	Danger	Escape Artist	1	Eliminated
Micky P Kerr	36	Comedy / Singing / Music	Comic Singer & Guitarist	5	Finalist
Mr Uekusa	30	Variety	Novelty Act	3	Eliminated
Nick Page	47	Comedy	Stand Up Comedian	2	Eliminated
Noel James	52	Comedy	Comedian	4	Eliminated
Olena Uutai	31	Music	Jaw Harpist	4	Eliminated
Rise Unbroken ^{2}	10–24	Dance	Dance Group	3	Eliminated
Robert White	41	Comedy / Singing / Music	Comic Singer & Keyboardist	3	Runner-Up
Ronan Busfield	33	Singing	Musical Theatre Singer	2	Eliminated
Sarah Llewellyn	32	Acrobatics / Singing	Contortionist & Opera Singer	5	Eliminated
Sascha Williams	29	Acrobatics	Rolla Bolla Acrobat	4	Eliminated
Shameer Rayes	19	Dance	Dancer	1	Eliminated
The D-Day Darlings	27–39	Singing	Vocal Harmony Group	1	Finalist

- ^1 Ages denoted for a participant(s), pertain to their final performance for this series.
- ^2 Each respective participant(s) auditioned under a different name, before changing them for their semi-final appearance.
- ^3 Locations for members of each respective group, or the group as a whole, were not disclosed during their time on the programme.

=== Semi-finals summary ===
Buzzed out | Judges' vote | Won the public vote
Won the judges' vote | Lost the judges' vote | Eliminated

==== Semi-final 1 (28 May) ====
- Guest performance: Diversity & The Cast Of Matilda the Musical ("Naughty"/"Revolting Children")

Semi-Finalist	Order	Performance Type	Buzzes and judges' votes				Percentage	Finished
Semi-Finalist	Order	Performance Type	Cowell	Holden	Dixon	Walliams	Percentage	Finished
Cali Swing	1	Salsa Dance Group					3.9%	7th - Eliminated
Lifford Shillingford	2	Singer					5.7%	6th - Eliminated
Shameer Rayes	3	Dancer					8.1%	4th - Eliminated
Maddox Dixon	4	Close Up Magician					13.5%	3rd (Lost Judges' Vote)
Ellie & Jeki	5	Quick Change Duo					1.1%	8th - Eliminated
Lost Voice Guy	6	Stand Up Comedian					40.5%	1st (Won Public Vote)
Matt Johnson ^{4}	7	Escape Artist					5.9%	5th - Eliminated
The D-Day Darlings	8	Vocal Group					21.3%	2nd (Won Judges' Vote)

- ^4 For health and safety reasons, Matt Johnson's semi-final performance required paramedics to be brought in as a precaution.

==== Semi-final 2 (29 May) ====
- Guest performance: Alfie Boe ("The Way You Look Tonight")

Semi-Finalist	Order	Performance Type	Buzzes and judges' votes				Percentage	Finished
Semi-Finalist	Order	Performance Type	Cowell	Holden	Dixon	Walliams	Percentage	Finished
B Positive Choir ^{5}	1	Choir					14.4%	3rd (Judges' Vote tied – Lost on Public Vote)
Futunity	2	Dance Group					12.4%	4th - Eliminated
Calum Courtney	3	Singer					16.1%	2nd (Judges' Vote tied – Won on Public Vote)
Andrew Lancaster	4	Impressionist					6.4%	7th - Eliminated
Nick Page	5	Stand Up Comedian					3.9%	8th - Eliminated
Ronan Busfield	6	Musical Theatre Singer					10.9%	6th - Eliminated
Magus Utopia	7	Magic Group					11.8%	5th - Eliminated
Donchez Dacres	8	Reggae Singer					24.1%	1st (Won Public Vote)

- ^5 B Positive Choir were later sent through to the final as the judges' wildcard.

==== Semi-final 3 (30 May) ====
- Guest performance: Rita Ora ("Girls")

Semi-Finalist	Order	Performance Type	Buzzes and judges' votes				Percentage	Finished
Semi-Finalist	Order	Performance Type	Cowell	Holden	Dixon	Walliams	Percentage	Finished
Acrocadabra	1	Acrobatic Group					3.7%	6th - Eliminated
DMU Gospel Choir	2	Gospel Choir					3.2%	7th - Eliminated
Marc Spelmann	3	Magician					18.0%	3rd (Judges' Vote tied – Lost on Public Vote)
Mr Uekusa	4	Novelty Act					2.9%	8th - Eliminated
Aleksandar Mileusnić	5	Swing Singer					9.4%	4th - Eliminated
Robert White	6	Comic Singer & Keyboardist					30.2%	1st (Won Public Vote)
Rise Unbroken	7	Dance Group					8.5%	5th - Eliminated
Gruffydd Wyn Roberts	8	Opera Singer					24.1%	2nd (Judges' Vote tied – Won on Public Vote)

==== Semi-final 4 (31 May) ====
- Guest performance: Cast of Chicago ("All I Care About"/"When You're Good to Mama"/"All That Jazz")

Semi-Finalist	Order	Performance Type	Buzzes and judges' votes				Percentage	Finished
Semi-Finalist	Order	Performance Type	Cowell	Holden	Dixon	Walliams	Percentage	Finished
Olena Uutai	1	Jaw Harpist					3.1%	8th - Eliminated
Amy Marie Borg	2	Opera Singer					7.4%	5th - Eliminated
Noel James	3	Comedian					12.2%	3rd (Lost Judges' Vote)
Baba Yega	4	Dance Group					6.5%	6th - Eliminated
Jack & Tim	5	Singing & Guitarist Duo					24.1%	2nd (Won Judges' Vote)
Sascha Williams ^{6}	6	Rolla Bolla Acrobat					8.9%	4th - Eliminated
Marty Putz	7	Comedian & Inventor					5.2%	7th - Eliminated
DVJ	8	Street Dance Group					32.6%	1st (Won Public Vote)

^6 For health and safety reasons, Sascha William's semi-final performance required fire extinguishers to be on standby as a precaution.

==== Semi-final 5 (1 June) ====
- Guest performance: Tokio Myers ("Children")

Semi-Finalist	Order	Performance Type	Buzzes and judges' votes				Percentage	Finished
Semi-Finalist	Order	Performance Type	Cowell	Holden	Dixon	Walliams	Percentage	Finished
DeMille & Muoneké	1	Jazz Singing Duo					9.1%	6th - Eliminated
Lexie & Christopher	2	Ballroom Dance Duo					5.8%	7th - Eliminated
Micky P Kerr	3	Comic Singer & Guitarist					21.5%	1st (Won Public Vote)
Sarah Llewellyn	4	Opera Singer & Contortionist					1.5%	8th - Eliminated
Bring It North	5	Boy Band					9.1%	5th - Eliminated
Mandy Muden	6	Comic Magician					19.4%	3rd (Judges' Vote tied – Lost on Public Vote)
Father Ray Kelly	7	Singer					13.5%	4th - Eliminated
Giang Brothers	8	Hand Balancing Duo					20.1%	2nd (Judges' Vote tied – Won on Public Vote)

=== Final (3 June) ===
- Guest performances: The Cast of Tina: The Musical ("Nutbush City Limits"/"Proud Mary") & The Cast of Magic Mike Live

Winner | Runner-up

Finalist	Order	Performance Type	Percentage	Finished
Calum Courtney	1	Singer	3.5%	9th
The D-Day Darlings	2	Vocal Group	7.1%	7th
Jack & Tim	3	Singing & Guitarist Duo	6.2%	8th
Robert White	4	Comic Singer & Keyboardist	17.2%	2nd
B Positive Choir	5	Choir	2.7%	11th
Lost Voice Guy	6	Stand Up Comedian	21.0%	1st
Giang Brothers	7	Hand Balancing Duo	9.5%	5th
Gruffydd Wyn Roberts	8	Opera Singer	11.2%	4th
DVJ	9	Street Dance Group	7.1%	6th
Micky P Kerr	10	Comic Singer & Guitarist	3.3%	10th
Donchez Dacres	11	Reggae Singer	11.2%	3rd

== Ratings ==
Episode	Air date	Total viewers (millions)	ITV Weekly rank
Auditions 1	14 April	10.98	1
Auditions 2	21 April	10.50	1
Auditions 3	28 April	11.48	1
Auditions 4	5 May	9.61	1
Auditions 5	12 May	9.55	1
Auditions 6	19 May	9.04	1
Auditions 7	26 May	7.83	4
Semi-final 1	28 May	7.22	12
Semi-final 1 results	28 May	6.72	14
Semi-final 2	29 May	7.78	9
Semi-final 2 results	29 May	6.12	19
Semi-final 3	30 May	8.12	8
Semi-final 3 results	30 May	6.80	13
Semi-final 4	31 May	7.56	11
Semi-final 4 results	31 May	6.40	18
Semi-final 5	1 June	7.58	10
Semi-final 5 results	1 June	6.63	15
Final	3 June	10.15	1

== Criticism ==
Viewers criticised BGT's twelfth series over two separate matters. The first concerned one of the golden buzzers conducted in the auditions for the twelfth series for singer Lifford Shillingford as being a "fix". Viewers complained on social media that he maintained a close connection to judge Alesha Dixon, who provided the buzzer, and thus had an unfair advantage over other participants. Both Dixon and Shillingford denied the allegations, which focused on comments made by the judge over the singer's performance, clarifying that while they knew each other, it was through their mutual work in the music industry and not from a close friendship.

The second concerned the guest performance by the cast members of the musical Magic Mike for the live final. The complaint centered around the suitability of the performance for a "family-based show", including the nature of the performers' routines and the overall tone of the performance. In response, the broadcaster refuted the allegations against the guest performers involvement, making clear that the content had been checked thoroughly to ensure it was suitable for young viewers and had met strict "compliance guidelines".
