= Lee Ridley (comedian) =

English stand-up comedian (born 1980)

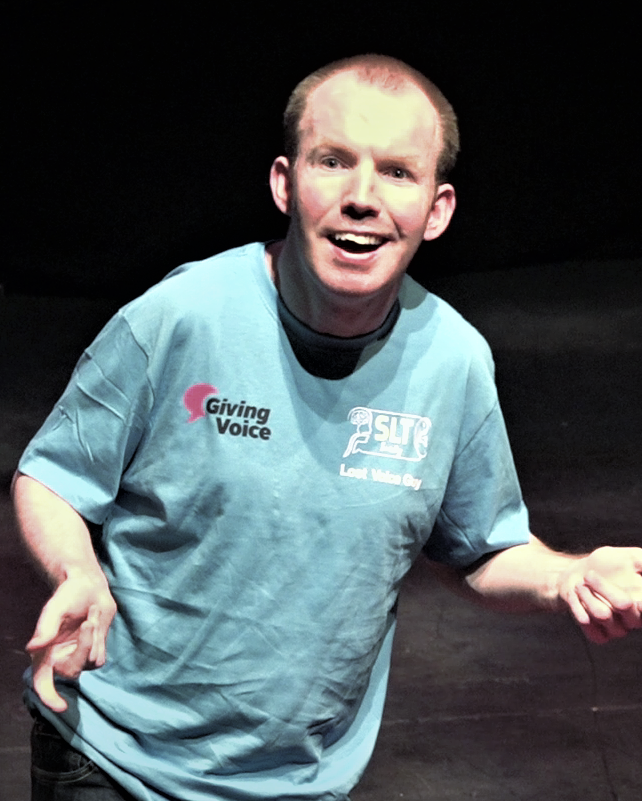
- Lost Voice Guy performing stand-up at the Northern Stage, Newcastle
- Born: 31 December 1980 (age 45); Consett, County Durham, England
- Other name: Lost Voice Guy
- Notable work: Britain's Got Talent (2018) America's Got Talent: The Champions (2019) Britain's Got Talent: The Champions (2019)

Comedy career
- Years active: 2012–present
- Medium: Stand-up, television
- Genres: Improvisational comedy, observational comedy
- Website: Official website

Lee Ridley (born 31 December 1980), better known by his stage name the Lost Voice Guy, is an English stand-up comedian. Disabled since early life, and unable to speak, in June 2018 he won the 12th series of Britain's Got Talent.

== Early life and education ==
Ridley is originally from Consett, County Durham. At the age of six months he was diagnosed with a form of cerebral palsy, brought about by a brain infection that left him in a coma for two months, which affected his movement and rendered him unable to speak. His disability in early life made it difficult for him to communicate with people, until the age of eight, when he received his first communication device.

Ridley attended Percy Hedley School for disabled children, in Newcastle, until 12, then, until 16, the Barbara Priestman Academy for autistic children, and the mainstream school, Thornhill Academy, in Sunderland.

Between 1999 and 2002, he studied journalism and online journalism at the University of Central Lancashire, achieving an undergraduate degree in the former, and a master's degree in the latter.

== Career ==
In 2006, he worked as a journalist with the BBC and local newspapers, before taking on the role of online content manager for the city of Sunderland in 2007.

In 2011, he worked as an online journalist for the Sunderland City Council media team and freelanced for dance and entertainment magazines and web sites.

Ridley began performing comedy in 2012.

His decision to perform standup himself came in the aftermath of a show by Ross Noble, after which Ridley encountered the comedian and challenged him on the quality of Noble's impersonation of Stephen Hawking, claiming he could do a far better impersonation of the renowned physicist. To formulate his routines, Ridley purchased an iPad text-to-speech app called Speak It!, which he pre-programmed with sentences based on material he created. Following his first show, Ridley adapted his routine by selecting material that had received favourable audience reaction, and adopting a style of improvisation in which he occasionally created new material onstage through his synthesiser in real time. His first successful show was at the Edinburgh Festival Fringe in 2013, but he was forced to cut this short after he developed pneumonia.

In 2014, Ridley won the BBC Radio New Comedy Awards.

In 2015, Ridley began to pursue a professional comedy career, performing a new show titled Disability for Dunces as part of the Edinburgh Fringe that year. The following year, he performed a sequel of the show, titled "Volume 2", and in 2017 he launched a new show titled Inspiration Porn, which made fun of "inspirational" videos and memes about disability.

By 2018, The Sequal Trust asked him to be a patron of their communication disability charity, a role he still plays.

In 2018, Ridley starred in Radio 4 sitcom Ability, which he co-wrote with the writer and comedian Katherine Jakeways (series 1 and 2) and Kat Butterfield and Daniel Audritt (series 3). His role involved playing the disabled 'Matt', who moves out from his parents' home to share with his best friend from school, who refreshingly treats him as an equal but is not the influence Matt's concerned parents are looking for. In June 2018, Ridley won the 12th series of Britain's Got Talent after successfully making it through the audition stages, and winning the show by the public vote. In February 2019, Ridley appeared in one episode of the BBC Three television series, Jerk.

In 2019, Ridley competed in America's Got Talent: The Champions, where he was eliminated in the preliminaries. He also released his first book I'm Only In It For The Parking.

In March 2021 he announced he would be working with a technology company, CereProc and the voice-artist Dan Pye to create a Consett accent similar to his family's.

== Awards and nominations ==
Year	Award	Category	Nominated work	Result
2018	Talent Recap Fan Choice Awards	Favorite Talent Show Winner	Britain's Got Talent	Winner

Preceded by Tokio Myers	Winner of Britain's Got Talent; 2018	Succeeded by Colin Thackery
