= Thornhill (surname) =

Thornhill is a surname of English origin, primarily tracing back to Lancashire and Yorkshire and taking its name from any of the nearby places also called Thornhill.

== Notable people ==
=== Real ===
- Alan Thornhill (1921–2020), English sculptor
- Arthur Thornhill (1850–1930), English politician
- Barbera Thornhill (Born 1948), American businesswoman
- Batt Thornhill (1911–1970), Irish hurler
- Charles Thornhill (1814–1881), English cricketer
- Claude Thornhill (1909–1965), American musician and bandleader
- Claude E. Thornhill (1893–1956), American college football player and coach
- Dorothy Thornhill (born 1955), English politician
- Frederick Thornhill (1846–1876), English cricketer
- George Thornhill (MP) (1783–1852), English politician
- George Thornhill (cricketer) (1811–1875), English cricketer
- James Thornhill (1675/6–1734), English painter
- Juan Thornhill (born 1996), American football player
- Leeroy Thornhill (born 1969), English musician
- Leonard W. Thornhill (1915–1942), American naval officer and pilot
- Lisa Thornhill (born 1962), American actress
- Matt Thornhill (born 1988), English footballer
- Michael Thornhill (1941–2022), Australian filmmaker
- Nina Thornhill (born 1953), English chemical engineer
- Pauline Thornhill, Canadian host and producer
- Roland Thornhill (born 1935), Canadian politician
- Siri Thornhill, Norwegian opera singer
- Thomas Thornhill (1837–1900), English politician
- William Thornhill (British Army officer) (1768–1851), British Army officer
- William Thornhill (MP for Poole) (c. 1500–1557), English politician
- William Pole Thornhill (1807–1876), English politician and landowner

=== Fictional ===
- Ernest Thornhill, a fake identity used by an AI the series Person of Interest (2011–2016)
- Roger O. Thornhill, Cary Grant's character in the film North by Northwest (1959)
