= Thornhill Academy =

Location
- Thornholme Road; Sunderland, Tyne and Wear, SR2 7NA; England
- 54.8972°N 1.39292°W

Information
- Type: Academy
- Local authority: Sunderland City Council
- Trust: Consilium Academies
- Department for Education URN: 144990 Tables
- Ofsted: Reports
- Headteacher: Sue Hamilton
- Gender: Co-educational
- Age: 11 to 16
- Enrolment: 577
- Website: http://thornhillschool.org.uk/

Thornhill Academy (formerly known as Thornhill School) is a co-educational secondary school located in Sunderland, Tyne and Wear, England.

Thornhill Academy admits pupils mainly from Barnes Junior School, Diamond Hall Junior School, Hudson Road Primary School and Richard Avenue Primary School.

The school offers GCSEs and BTECs as programmes of study for pupils. Graduating students often go on to study at the Bede Sixth Form, a sixth form consortium including Thornhill Academy and Sunderland College.

== History ==
It was a community school administered by Sunderland City Council, and had a specialism in business and enterprise. In September 2017 Thornhill School converted to academy status and was renamed Thornhill Academy. The school is now sponsored by Consilium Academies.

== Notable alumni ==
- Lee Ridley (born 1980), stand-up comedian
