= Freckled Sky =

American multimedia company

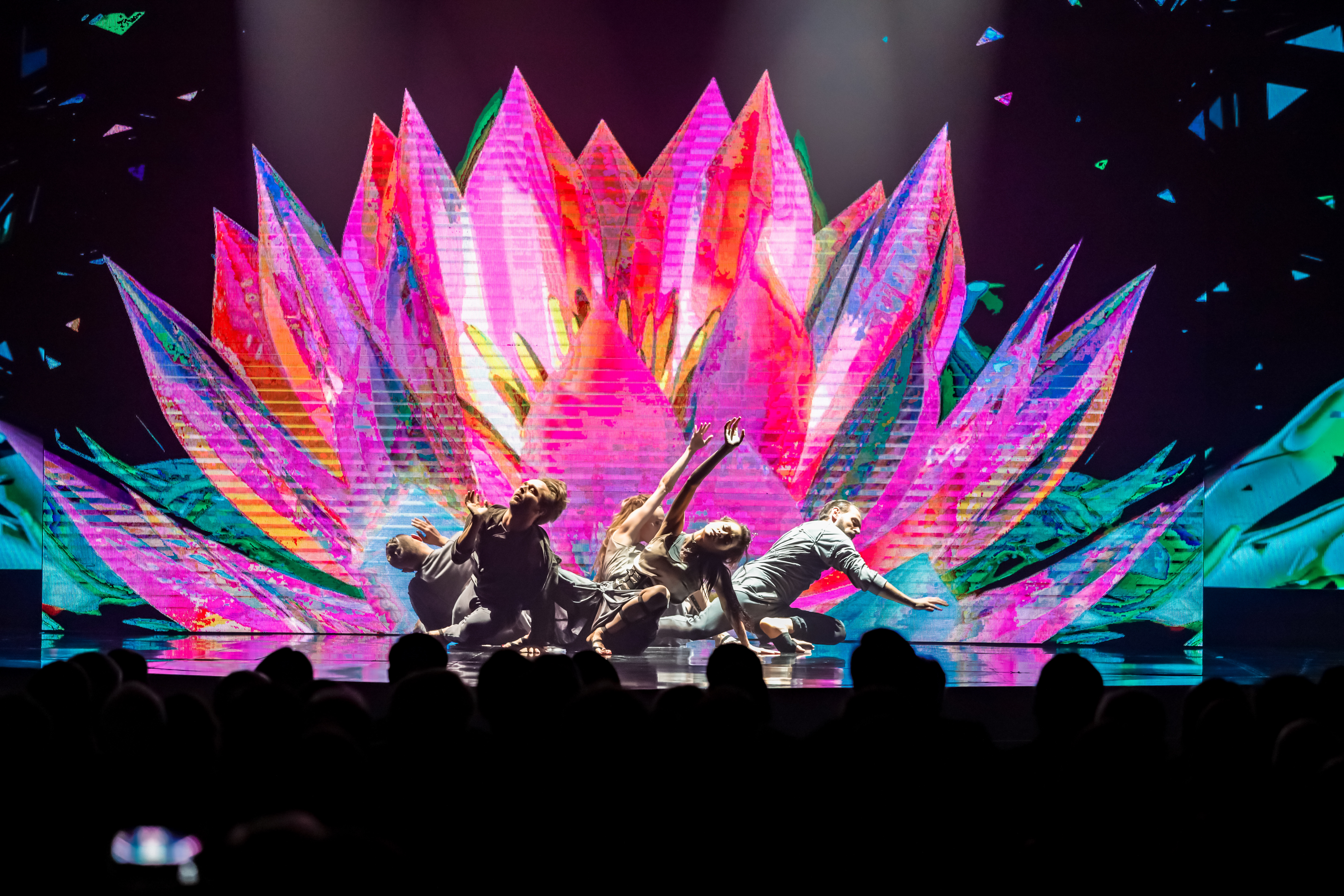
- Freckled Sky Interactive Performance at Panama Canal Expansion opening ceremony, 2016
- Industry: digital art, event management
- Founded: February 24, 2015; 11 years ago in Chicago, United States
- Founders: Val Syganevich, Katia Korobko
- Headquarters: 730 Hinman Ave, #2W, Evanston, Illinois, United States
- Website: freckledsky.com

Freckled Sky is a multimedia company that specializes in performances and events with digital special effects which include projection mappings. Freckled Sky was founded in Chicago in 2015 and gained popularity competing in America's Got Talent show where their team demonstrated the world's first interactive performance with a digital mapping on water. Since then, the company participated in a number of notable business, theater, and music events.

== History ==
Freckled Sky was founded on February 24, 2015, in Chicago by Ukrainian immigrants Val Syganevich and his sister Katia Korobko. Before coming to the United States in November 2014, the duo participated in the Ukrainian league of KVN games (a humor TV improv which also included the future Ukrainian president Volodymyr Zelenskyy) and ran one of the top ten Ukrainian event agencies. Syganevich considered his move to the United States as an opportunity to reach out to larger audiences. Syganevich and Korobko chose the name Freckled Sky (Ukrainian: Небо в ластовинні) after their father's poetry collection of the same name. Freckled Sky's debut was America's Got Talent show in the summer of 2015 which gained the team popularity and favorable media coverage.

== Notable performances ==
=== America's got talent ===
External videos
- Freckled Sky: America's Got Talent's Golden Buzzer Act, YouTube video

For the America's Got Talent (season 10) auditions in 2015, Freckled Sky team cast two dancers, Olga Sokolova and Jalen Preston who danced in the artificial rain generated by a 15 by 20 feet (4.6 m × 6.1 m) water screen The audience and judges were stunned by a projection mapping on water – the world's first interactive performance of this kind. Howard Stern who judged the auditions called Val Syganevich "a genius" and used his once-per-season Golden Buzzer to propel Freckled Sky team directly to the quarterfinals.

=== Something Wicked This Way Comes ===
In the season of 2017, Freckled Sky produced special effects for Delaware Theater Company's production of Ray Bradbury's novel Something Wicked This Way Comes. The production was highly acclaimed by critics: WHYY-TV calling the effects "jaw-dropping", The News Journal – "wowing the crowds", and BroadwayWorld – "mind-boggling, nothing before ever seen". Freckled Sky set up included 36 by 20 feet (11.0 m × 6.1 m) video wall, 16 intelligent moving lights, and a scrim, invisible to the audience – all combined to produce "stupefying, otherworldly special effects."

=== P!nk's Brit Awards 2019 ===
In February 2019, Freckled Sky produced interactive water projection performance for the Try portion of P!nk's mash-up at 39th edition of Brit Awards, leaving "the audience in awe."

== Team and Services ==
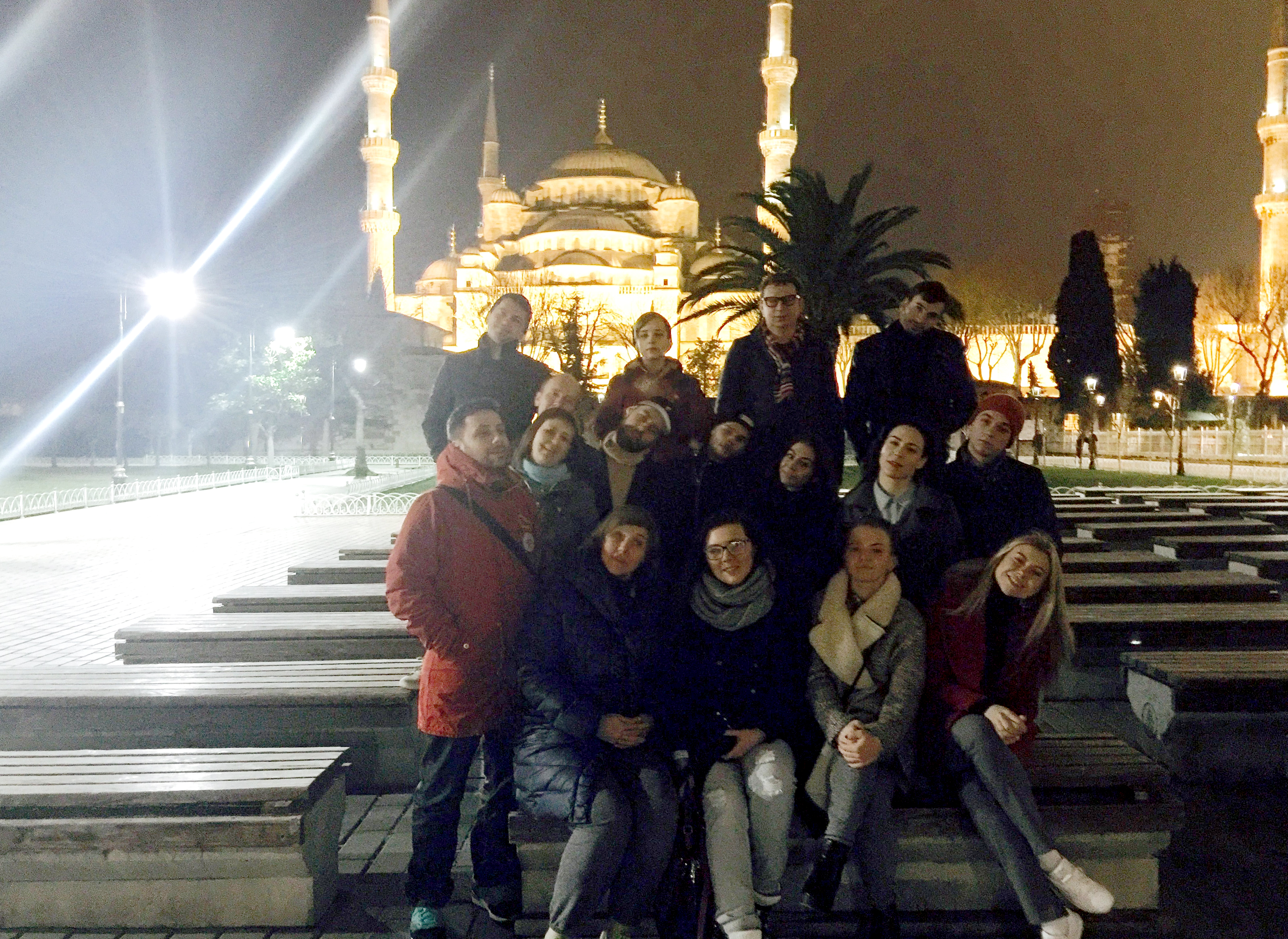
Freckled Sky team after Mercedes-Benz Travego launch show, Istanbul, 2016

Freckled Sky's team is a mix of artistic creators and technology experts. They aim to erase boundaries between performers and their audiences by creating new forms of entertainment and using high-end technologies, by mixing together projections, dance, lightning, interactive solutions, and other special effects. In 2018, Freckled Sky team included 30 permanent members and 35 additional part-time contributors. The company produced multiple corporate and brand-promotion events in United States, Americas, Europe, Africa, and Asia. Freckled Sky's clients include BMW, Ferrari, Mercedes-Benz, Panama Canal Authority, Unilever, and Aditya Birla Group.

== Awards ==
External videos
- Panama Canal Expansion Opening Ceremony, 2016, YouTube video

- Visual Artist Awards, 2018, Best Mapping with Human Interaction, winner
- Barrymore Award, 2018, Outstanding Media Design.
- Hermes Creative Awards, 2017, Platinum, Live interactive projection show for the Magnum Double Night event
- Hermes Creative Awards, 2017, Platinum, Live interactive projection show for the New Mercedes-Benz Travego launch event
- Hermes Creative Awards, 2017, Platinum, Live interactive projection show for the Aditya Birla Group Award ceremony
- Hermes Creative Awards, 2017, Platinum, One-of-a-kind live interactive performance with water screen projection for America's Got Talent
- Hermes Creative Awards, 2017, Gold, Live interactive performance for the New BMW 7 Series launch event
- Hermes Creative Awards, 2017, Gold, Live interactive show for the Panama Canal Expansion opening ceremony

== See also ==
- Projection mapping
- Special effects
- America's Got Talent
