= Paul Zerdin =

British comedian and ventriloquist (born 1972)

- Born: 21 August 1972 (age 54); London, England
- Occupations: Ventriloquist, comedian
- Years active: 1993; 1996; 2008; 2015–present
- Agent: https://intertalentgroup.com/
- Notable work: America's Got Talent (season 10) (Winner)
- Television: See list
- Website: www.paulzerdin.com

Paul Zerdin (born 21 August 1972) is a British comedian and ventriloquist from London. He was the winner of the 10th season of America's Got Talent.

== Early life ==
When Zerdin was 10, a family friend made him a puppet theatre which he used to put on shows. Having failed his GCSEs, Zerdin got a job in a magic shop, developing his magic skills along the way. Simultaneously, he was also developing a sideline as a children's entertainer.

== Career ==
Zerdin made his TV debut as a magician on the BBC's Tricky Business. Shortly afterwards, at the age of 20, Zerdin landed a two-year contract presenting the Disney-produced children's programme Rise and Shine for GMTV.

In 1996, Zerdin was the first outright winner – by over 100,000 votes – of LWT's The Big Big Talent Show, hosted by Jonathan Ross. Lythgoe secured Zerdin a spot on The Prince's Trust Gala Show in 1997.

During the 2016-17 Christmas season, Zerdin played Cinderella's sidekick Buttons in the London Palladium production of the pantomime Cinderella, leading the Radio Times to dub him "inspired casting." The magazine added that "His quick wit, rapport with the crowd and astonishing skills with puppet Sam turn the often toe-curling audience participation bits (don't sit in the front row) into genuinely hilarious moments."

== Got Talent ==
In 2015, Zerdin auditioned for the tenth season of America’s Got Talent, successfully earning a place in the live rounds of the contest, before eventually winning the finals on 16 September 2015. Alongside winning $1 million, Zerdin was given his own headline show in Las Vegas. Entitled Mouthing Off, it ran for four months in 2016, between 14 May and 4 September, at Planet Hollywood, before closing due to low attendance figures. In 2019, Zerdin returned to partake in the programme's spin-off contest, America's Got Talent: The Champions, in January, and the spin-off contest, Britain's Got Talent: The Champions, in July later that year, but failed to reach the final of either show.

== Filmography ==
=== Television ===
Year	Title	Role	Notes
1993	Rise and Shine	Presenter	GMTV (Kids)
1996	The Big Big Talent Show	Himself	Winner
1996	Sooty & Co.	Little Cousin Paul	ITV
2008	The Convention Crasher	Himself	Channel 4
2015	America's Got Talent	Himself	Winner
2016	America's Got Talent	Himself and Guest	NBC
2016	Newzoids	Himself	ITV
2017	Who Wants To Be a Millionaire?	Himself and Guest	ABC
2019	Britain's Got Talent	Himself	ITV
2019	Tenable All Stars	Himself	ITV
2021	Justin's House	Himself	CBeebies

=== Stage ===
Year	Title	Role	Venue/ Place	Notes
1998	Paul Zerdin in Paradise	Himself	Blackpool Pleasure Beach	Paradise Room in The Casino (11 July - 7 November)
2017, 2018, 2020	Paul Zerdin LIVE	Himself	Butlins (Minehead, Bognor and Skegness)	School summer holidays only and February half term (2018 only)
2016	Cinderella	Buttons	The London Palladium	
2017	Paul Zerdin All Mouth	Himself	UK Tour	
2017	Dick Whittington	Idle Jack	The London Palladium	
2018	Snow White	Muddles	The London Palladium	
2019	Goldilocks & the Three Bears	Silly Billy	The London Palladium	
2022	Jack and the Beanstalk	Silly Simon	The London Palladium	

=== Film ===
Year	Title	Role	Notes
2018	Karts in Suzuka	Sam Zerdin	

== See also ==
- Ventriloquism

Preceded by Mat Franco	America's Got Talent winner Season 10 (Summer 2015)	Succeeded by Grace VanderWaal
