= Merited Artist of Vietnam =

Vietnamese honorary title for artists

Merited artist (Vietnamese: Nghệ sĩ Ưu tú, also translated as Meritorious Artist, Deserved Artist, Distinguished Artist, Honoured Artist) is an honorary title awarded by the Vietnamese State to artists who have contributions to arts. This title is popular in the Soviet Union, Eastern Bloc. This title is lower than the title of People's Artist.

== Conditions to be awarded ==
According to Article 64 of the Vietnamese Emulation and Reward Law, the conditions for becoming a Merited Artist in Vietnam are:

1. Loyalty to the Socialist Republic of Vietnam; Strictly abide by the Party's guidelines, the State's policies and laws, the regulations and rules of agencies, organizations, and localities.
2. Having good moral qualities, exemplary in life, devoted to the profession; having excellent artistic talents; reputable profession; Having the spirit of serving people, admired by colleagues and people.
3. Having worked in arts for 15 years or more, especially for Circus and Dance for 10 years or more; Awarded many awards from domestic and overseas festivals, art shows.
4. Having at least two national gold awards or one national gold award and two national silver award.

Similar to the title of Merited Artist are titles such as Merited Teacher, Merited Doctor.
