= List of Britain's Got Talent episodes =

Britain's Got Talent is a British reality television talent show that has aired nineteen series on ITV since 9 June 2007. This is a list of television ratings for all broadcast episodes. The twentieth series is scheduled to air in 2027 which will coincide the talent show's twentieth anniversary.

== Series overview ==
Series	Episodes	Originally released		Avg. UK viewers (millions)
Series	Episodes	First released	Last released	Avg. UK viewers (millions)
1	10	9 June 2007	17 June 2007	8.38
2	14	12 April 2008	31 May 2008	10.21
3	14	11 April 2009	30 May 2009	13.36
4	18	17 April 2010	5 June 2010	11.05
5	19	16 April 2011	4 June 2011	10.40
6	17	24 March 2012	12 May 2012	10.07
7	18	13 April 2013	8 June 2013	9.71
8	18	12 April 2014	7 June 2014	9.84
9	18	11 April 2015	31 May 2015	9.31
10	18	9 April 2016	28 May 2016	9.43
11	18	15 April 2017	3 June 2017	9.12
12	18	14 April 2018	3 June 2018	8.33
13	19	6 April 2019	2 June 2019	8.32
14	15	11 April 2020	10 October 2020	8.15
15	14	16 April 2022	5 June 2022	6.36
16	14	15 April 2023	4 June 2023	5.98
17	14	20 April 2024	2 June 2024	5.81
18	14	22 February 2025	31 May 2025	5.54
19	14	21 February 2026	30 May 2026	4.40
20	14	2027	2027	TBA

== Ratings ==
=== Series 1 (2007) ===
Episode	Air date	Total viewers (millions)	ITV1 Weekly rank	Viewer share
Auditions 1	9 June	5.20	12	22.7%
Auditions 2	10 June	6.73	8	28.0%
Auditions 3	11 June	7.28	15	29.4%
Auditions 4	12 June	7.39	13	29.3%
Auditions 5	13 June	7.51	11	29.2%
Semi-final 1	14 June	8.36	9	34.0%
Semi-final 2	15 June	9.28	8	38.1%
Semi-final 3	16 June	9.29	7	40.9%
Live final	17 June	11.58	1	43.7%
Live final results	17 June	11.45	2	44.7%

=== Series 2 (2008) ===
Episode	Air date	Total viewers (millions)	ITV 1 weekly rank	Viewer share
Auditions 1	12 April	9.44	6	37.0%
Auditions 2	19 April	10.96	1	43.3%
Auditions 3	26 April	9.86	3	41.3%
Auditions 4	3 May	9.12	5	39.1%
Auditions 5	10 May	8.17	6	37.9%
Auditions 6	17 May	9.11	2	37.5%
Auditions 7	24 May	8.27	5	37.2%
Semi-final 1	26 May	11.33	4	42.0%
Semi-final 2	27 May	9.29	9	35.3%
Semi-final 3	28 May	10.03	6	35.9%
Semi-final 4	29 May	10.13	5	41.9%
Semi-final 5	30 May	11.86	2	50.0%
Live final	31 May	11.52	3	51.1%
Live final results	31 May	13.88	1	55.1%

=== Series 3 (2009) ===
Episode	Air Date	Total Viewers (millions)	ITV1 Weekly rank	Viewer Share
Auditions 1	11 April	11.21	1	45.1%
Auditions 2	18 April	12.95	1	50.6%
Auditions 3	25 April	13.21	1	52.3%
Auditions 4	2 May	11.30	1	47.2%
Auditions 5	9 May	11.98	1	48.4%
Auditions 6	16 May	11.09	1	41.0%
Auditions 7	23 May	12.62	2	51.1%
Semi-final 1	24 May	12.93	1	49.2%
Semi-final 2	25 May	14.66	3	51.6%
Semi-final 3	26 May	13.56	5	49.9%
Semi-final 4	28 May	13.11	6	51.2%
Semi-final 5	29 May	13.84	4	57.3%
Live final	30 May	16.36	2	71%
Live final results	30 May	18.29	1	67.6%

=== Series 4 (2010) ===
Episode	Air Date	Total viewers (millions)	ITV1 Weekly rank	Viewer Share (%)
Auditions 1	17 April	11.87	1	44.0
Auditions 2	24 April	11.60	1	45.7
Auditions 3	1 May	11.84	1	43.9
Auditions 4	8 May	12.17	1	44.1
Auditions 5	15 May	10.84	1	43.8
Auditions 6	23 May	10.68	1	42.8
Auditions 7	29 May	10.87	1	40.3
Semi-final 1	31 May	11.82	2	43.1
Semi-final 1 results	31 May	11.32	4	40.3
Semi-final 2	1 June	11.17	5	41.2
Semi-final 2 results	1 June	10.69	8	39.0
Semi-final 3	2 June	10.88	6	45.6
Semi-final 3 results	2 June	9.19	13	34.2
Semi-final 4	3 June	10.37	9	48.2
Semi-final 4 results	3 June	10.34	10	41.7
Semi-final 5	4 June	10.13	11	46.3
Semi-final 5 results	4 June	9.64	12	39.4
Live final	5 June	13.50	1	54.6

=== Series 5 (2011) ===
Episode	Air Date	Total viewers (millions)	ITV1 Weekly rank	Viewer Share (%)
Auditions 1	16 April	11.42	3	40.5
Auditions 2	23 April	10.62	3	41.5
Auditions 3	30 April	10.65	1	39.9
Auditions 4	7 May	11.69	1	42.2
Auditions 5	14 May	9.72	3	32.0
Auditions 6	21 May	11.16	1	42.2
Auditions 7	29 May	11.53	1	40.4
Semi-final 1	30 May	12.27	4	41.9
Semi-final 1 results	30 May	11.16	6	38.2
Semi-final 2	31 May	10.65	10	40.5
Semi-final 2 results	31 May	10.04	15	35.8
Semi-final 3	1 June	10.31	16	41.8
Semi-final 3 results	1 June	8.67	17	28.9
Semi-final 4	2 June	10.53	12	43.2
Semi-final 4 results	2 June	10.48	11	39.1
Semi-final 5	3 June	10.36	14	43.3
Semi-final 5 results	3 June	10.61	9	42.3
Live final	4 June	12.70	2	47.0
Live final results	4 June	12.95	1	49.3

=== Series 6 (2012) ===
Episode	Air date	Total viewers (millions)	ITV1 weekly rank	Viewer share (%)
Auditions 1	24 March	11.57	3	39.2
Auditions 2	31 March	12.17	1	41.3
Auditions 3	7 April	11.95	1	38.7
Auditions 4	14 April	12.18	1	39.5
Auditions 5	21 April	11.60	1	38.2
Auditions 6	28 April	11.97	1	41.8
Auditions 7	5 May	11.27	1	38.9
Semi-final 1	6 May	11.01	2	35.5
Semi-final 2	7 May	10.77	2	35.6
Semi-final 2 results	7 May	9.44	9	32.4
Semi-final 3	8 May	9.12	12	33.5
Semi-final 3 results	8 May	7.91	15	27.8
Semi-final 4	9 May	10.15	3	37.6
Semi-final 4 results	9 May	7.95	14	27.3
Semi-final 5	10 May	9.90	7	36.6
Semi-final 5 results	10 May	8.83	13	30.2
Live final	12 May	13.12	1	46.4

=== Series 7 (2013) ===
Episode	Date	Total ITV viewers (millions)	Weekly rank	Share (%)
Auditions 1	13 April	12.13	1	36.9
Auditions 2	20 April	11.86	1	43.9
Auditions 3	27 April	11.08	1	43.9
Auditions 4	4 May	11.59	1	45.0
Auditions 5	11 May	12.36	1	45.2
Auditions 6	18 May	10.88	1	38.1
Auditions 7	26 May	9.74	3	38.0
Semi-final 1	27 May	11.48	1	41.5
Semi-final 1 results	27 May	9.27	10	31.4
Semi-final 2	28 May	10.20	6	36.5
Semi-final 2 results	28 May	8.39	14	28.5
Semi-final 3	30 May	9.76	8	37.5
Semi-final 3 results	30 May	8.51	13	32.3
Semi-final 4	31 May	9.98	7	37.5
Semi-final 4 results	31 May	8.71	12	32.7
Semi-final 5	1 June	9.74	9	41.9
Semi-final 5 results	1 June	9.04	11	32.8
Live final	8 June	12.85	1	48.9

=== Series 8 (2014) ===
Episode	Date	Total viewers (millions)	Weekly rank	Share (%)
Auditions 1	12 April	12.41	1	45.0
Auditions 2	19 April	11.05	1	40.4
Auditions 3	26 April	11.33	1	42.6
Auditions 4	3 May	10.90	1	42.3
Auditions 5	10 May	11.14	1	41.1
Auditions 6	17 May	10.70	1	40.9
Auditions 7	25 May	9.93	1	38.9
Semi-final 1	26 May	10.94	1	39.1
Semi-final 1 results	26 May	8.87	10	33.3
Semi-final 2	27 May	9.36	8	34.9
Semi-final 2 results	27 May	7.54	14	27.4
Semi-final 3	28 May	9.41	6	36.7
Semi-final 3 results	28 May	7.55	13	28.7
Semi-final 4	29 May	9.53	7	36.7
Semi-final 4 results	29 May	8.39	12	33.3
Semi-final 5	31 May	8.97	11	38.1
Semi-final 5 results	31 May	7.09	19	28.2
Live final	7 June	12.05	1	49.0

=== Series 9 (2015) ===
Episode	Date	Total viewers (millions)	Weekly rank	Share (%)
Auditions 1	11 April	11.25	1	43.2
Auditions 2	18 April	11.47	1	44.1
Auditions 3	25 April	11.87	1	46.3
Auditions 4	2 May	11.73	1	45.0
Auditions 5	9 May	11.64	1	45.1
Auditions 6	16 May	11.55	1	47.0
Auditions 7	23 May	9.35	1	35.2
Semi-final 1	25 May	10.18	3	37.8
Semi-final 1 results	25 May	7.74	15	28.7
Semi-final 2	26 May	9.34	10	36.8
Semi-final 2 results	26 May	7.60	16	31.1
Semi-final 3	27 May	9.48	6	38.8
Semi-final 3 results	27 May	8.09	13	31.7
Semi-final 4	28 May	9.26	11	37.2
Semi-final 4 results	28 May	7.87	12	34.5
Semi-final 5	29 May	9.51	8	39.2
Semi-final 5 results	29 May	7.91	14	32.1
Live final	31 May	12.75	1	46.6

=== Series 10 (2016) ===
Episode	Air date	Total viewers (millions)	ITV Weekly rank
Auditions 1	9 April	11.67	1
Auditions 2	16 April	12.59	1
Auditions 3	23 April	12.46	1
Auditions 4	30 April	12.05	1
Auditions 5	7 May	11.55	1
Auditions 6	14 May	10.42	1
Auditions 7	21 May	10.46	1
Semi-final 1	22 May	10.01	2
Semi-final 1 results	22 May	7.16 ^{9}	8
Semi-final 2	23 May	8.51	8
Semi-final 2 results	23 May	6.72	13
Semi-final 3	24 May	8.23	9
Semi-final 3 results	24 May	6.56	15
Semi-final 4	25 May	8.75	4
Semi-final 4 results	25 May	7.33	11
Semi-final 5	26 May	8.56	5
Semi-final 5 results	26 May	7.43	10
Final	28 May	10.48	1

- ^9 Excludes ITV+1.

=== Series 11 (2017) ===
Episode	Air date	Total viewers (millions)	ITV weekly rank
Auditions 1	15 April	11.35	1
Auditions 2	22 April	11.62	2
Auditions 3	29 April	10.79	1
Auditions 4	6 May	11.69	1
Auditions 5	13 May	10.97	1
Auditions 6	20 May	11.39	1
Auditions 7	27 May	10.69	1
Semi-final 1	29 May	9.75	2
Semi-final 1 results	29 May	7.19	12
Semi-final 2	30 May	7.90	10
Semi-final 2 results	30 May	6.44	16
Semi-final 3	31 May	8.24	8
Semi-final 3 results	31 May	6.78	14
Semi-final 4	1 June	7.54	11
Semi-final 4 results	1 June	7.09	13
Semi-final 5	2 June	8.10	9
Semi-final 5 results	2 June	6.51	15
Final	3 June	10.07	1

=== Series 12 (2018) ===
Episode	Air date	Total viewers (millions)	ITV Weekly rank
Auditions 1	14 April	10.98	1
Auditions 2	21 April	10.50	1
Auditions 3	28 April	11.48	1
Auditions 4	5 May	9.61	1
Auditions 5	12 May	9.55	1
Auditions 6	19 May	9.04	1
Auditions 7	26 May	7.83	4
Semi-final 1	28 May	7.22	12
Semi-final 1 results	28 May	6.72	14
Semi-final 2	29 May	7.78	9
Semi-final 2 results	29 May	6.12	19
Semi-final 3	30 May	8.12	8
Semi-final 3 results	30 May	6.80	13
Semi-final 4	31 May	7.56	11
Semi-final 4 results	31 May	6.40	18
Semi-final 5	1 June	7.58	10
Semi-final 5 results	1 June	6.63	15
Final	3 June	10.15	1

=== Series 13 (2019) ===
Episode	Air date	Total viewers (millions)	ITV Weekly rank
Auditions 1	6 April	10.30	1
Auditions 2	13 April	10.12	1
Auditions 3	20 April	9.13	1
Auditions 4	27 April	9.78	1
Auditions 5	4 May	9.66	1
Auditions 6	11 May	9.39	1
Auditions 7	18 May	8.53	1
Auditions 8	25 May	8.04	1
Semi-final 1	27 May	8.69	2
Semi-final 1 results	27 May	6.68	12
Semi-final 2	28 May	7.64	4
Semi-final 2 results	28 May	6.12	17
Semi-final 3	29 May	7.70	3
Semi-final 3 results	29 May	5.59	20
Semi-final 4	30 May	7.26	6
Semi-final 4 results	30 May	5.58	21
Semi-final 5	31 May	7.03	10
Semi-final 5 results	31 May	5.92	18
Final	2 June	9.73	1

=== Series 14 (2020) ===
Episode	Air date	Total viewers (millions)	ITV Weekly rank
Auditions 1	11 April	10.96	1
Auditions 2	18 April	10.32	1
Auditions 3	25 April	10.04	1
Auditions 4	2 May	9.84	1
Auditions 5	9 May	8.92	1
Auditions 6	16 May	8.89	1
Auditions 7	23 May	8.73	1
Auditions 8	30 May	7.62	1
The Finalists Revealed	30 August	5.06	7
Semi-final 1	5 September	7.13	1
Semi-final 2	12 September	6.11	4
Semi-final 3	19 September	5.58	9
Semi-final 4	26 September	6.07	5
Semi-final 5	3 October	5.80	9
Final	10 October	7.12	1

=== Series 15 (2022) ===
Episode	Air date	Total viewers (millions)	ITV Weekly rank
Auditions 1	16 April	8.31	2
Auditions 2	17 April	6.94	3
Auditions 3	23 April	7.03	4
Auditions 4	30 April	7.29	1
Auditions 5	7 May	6.93	1
Auditions 6	14 May	6.55	1
Auditions 7	21 May	7.00	1
Auditions 8	28 May	5.84	1
Semi-Final 1	30 May	5.89	2
Semi-Final 2	31 May	5.46	3
Semi-Final 3	1 June	5.06	9
Semi-Final 4	2 June	4.70	11
Semi-Final 5	3 June	5.23	6
Final	5 June	7.07	1

=== Series 16 (2023) ===
Episode	Air date	Total viewers (millions)	ITV Weekly rank
Auditions 1	15 April	7.10	1
Auditions 2	16 April	6.42	2
Auditions 3	22 April	7.32	1
Auditions 4	29 April	6.49	1
Auditions 5	6 May	6.63	5
Auditions 6	14 May	5.70	3
Auditions 7	20 May	5.96	1
Auditions 8	27 May	5.92	1
Semi-Final 1	29 May	5.58	2
Semi-Final 2	30 May	5.38	3
Semi-Final 3	31 May	5.00	5
Semi-Final 4	1 June	4.80	6
Semi-Final 5	2 June	5.04	4
Final	4 June	6.33	1
