= Britain's Got Talent series 10 =

Britain's Got Talent
- Series 10
- Presented by: Ant & Dec (ITV); Stephen Mulhern (ITV2)
- Judges: David Walliams; Alesha Dixon; Amanda Holden; Simon Cowell; Kathleen Williams (guest)
- Winner: Richard Jones
- Runner-up: Wayne Woodward

Release
- Original network: ITV; ITV2 (BGMT)
- Original release: 9 April – 28 May 2016

Series chronology
- ← Previous; Series 9 Next → Series 11

Judges and Presenter(s) for Britain's Got Talent Series 10

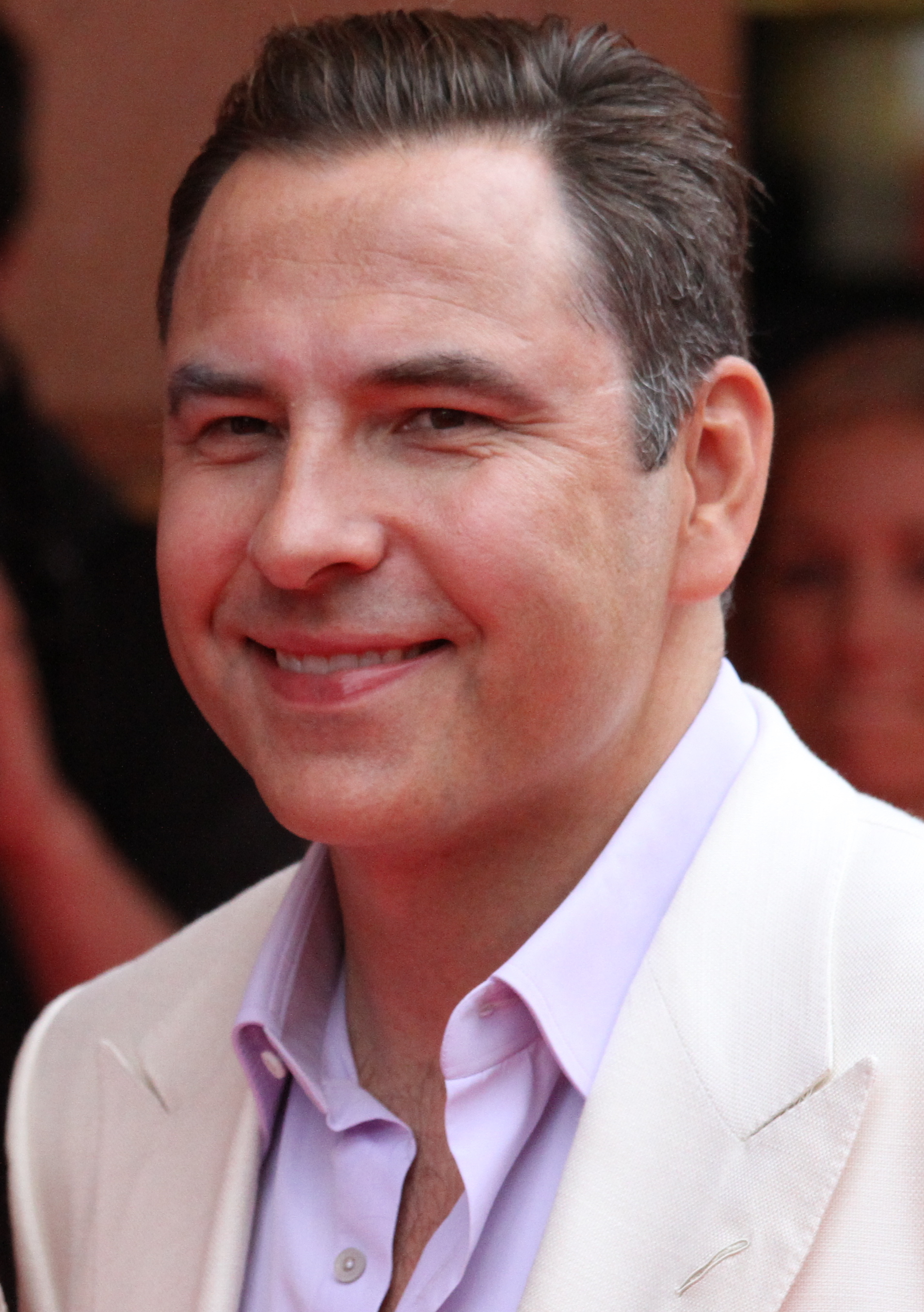
David Walliams

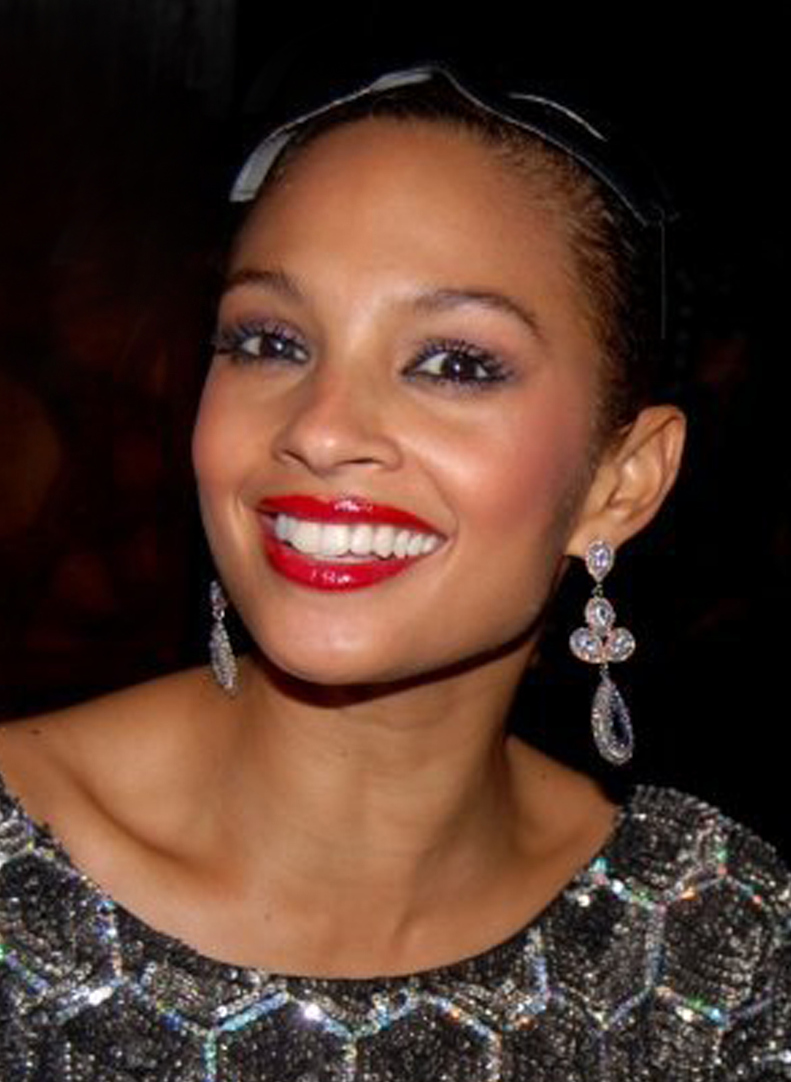
Alesha Dixon

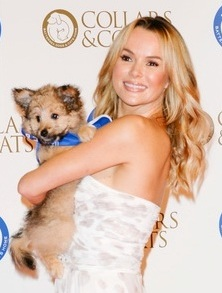
Amanda Holden

Simon Cowell

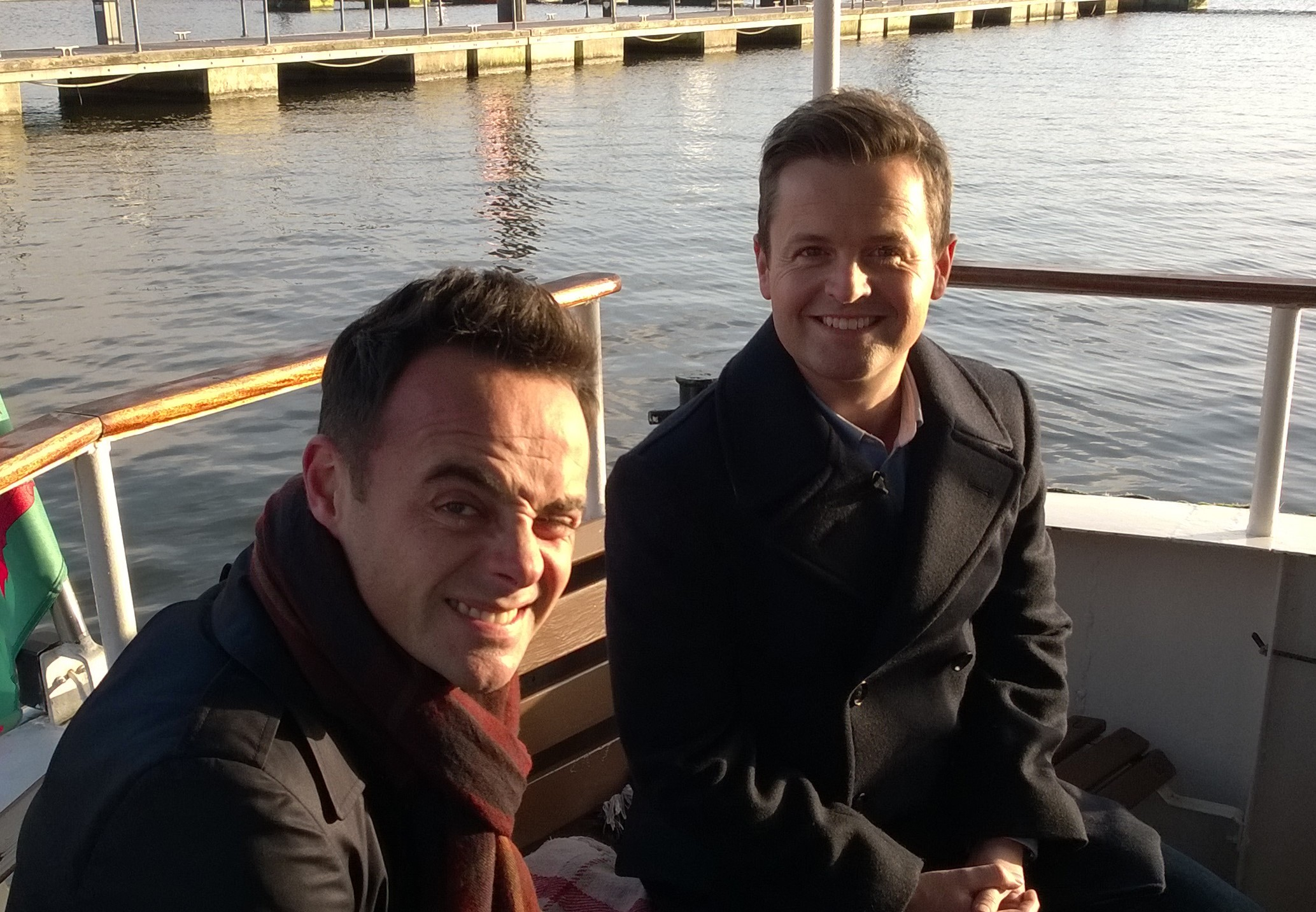
Ant & Dec (ITV1)

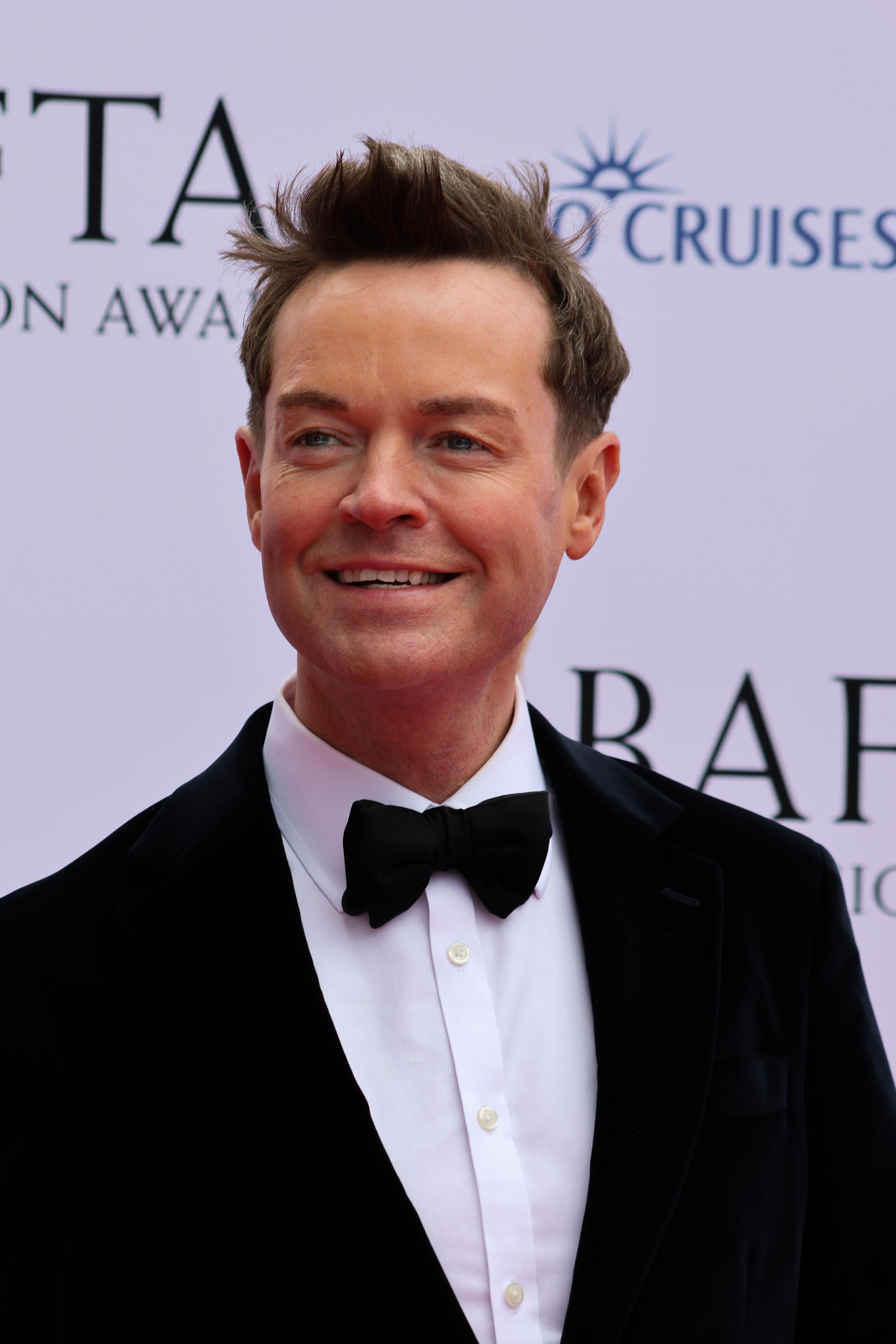
Stephen Mulhern (ITV2)

The tenth series of the British talent competition programme Britain's Got Talent was broadcast on ITV, from 9 April to 28 May 2016. To celebrate ten series of the show, the final featured a special performance entitled "Best of Britain’s Got Talent", which featured several participants who had appeared on the show during the previous nine series, including Ashleigh and Pudsey, Attraction, Diversity, Jon Clegg, Stavros Flatley, Collabro and Spelbound. It was the last series to have its live episodes broadcast at The Fountain Studios before the site's closure that year.

The tenth series was won by magician Richard Jones, with jazz singer Wayne Woodward finishing in second place and dance troupe Boogie Storm third. During its broadcast, the series averaged around 9.5 million viewers. Although the main programme faced no major incidents, its companion show Britain's Got More Talent caused controversy for incorporating a segment that was later criticised by Simon Cowell.

== Series overview ==
Following open auditions held between October and December 2015, including an additional one on 10 January 2016, the Judges' auditions took place between January and February 2016, within Liverpool, Birmingham, and London. There were no major incidents amongst the judging panel that forced them to be absent, although Simon Cowell arrived late for the London auditions on 23 January - David Walliams's mother, Kathleen Williams, who was attending these, stood in for him for a number of auditions until he arrived.

Of the participants that took part, only forty-five made it into the five live semi-finals - of these acts, singer Beau Dermott, gospel choir 100 Voices of Gospel, singer Jasmine Elcock, singing duo Anne & Ian Marshall, and dance troupe Boogie Storm, each received a golden buzzer during their auditions - with nine appearing in each one, and twelve of these acts making it into the live final; the Judges' Wildcard was dancing duo Shannon & Peter, who lost the Judges' vote in the second semi-final, while the Public Wildcard was dog act Trip Hazard, who lost the Judges' vote in the final semi-final.

Unlike previous series, where the top 3 in each semi final was announced in no particular order, the contestants were announced in order of how many public votes they received, starting from last place, and working up to 4th place, leaving the top 3.

The below lists the results of each participant's overall performance in this series:

Winner | Runner-up | Finalist | Semi-finalist
Judges' Wildcard Finalist | Public Wildcard Finalist | Golden Buzzer Audition

Participant	Age(s) ^{1}	Genre	Performance Type	Semi-final	Result
100 Voices of Gospel	21-52	Singing	Gospel Choir	1	Finalist
Alex Magala ^{3}	26	Danger	Sword Swallower	2	Finalist
Ana & Fia Almanda	18 & 42	Singing	Singing Duo	5	Eliminated
Anne & Ian Marshall	61 & 65	Singing	Singing Duo	2	Eliminated
Another Kind of Blue	23–40	Dance	Projection Dance Group	2	Eliminated
Balance Unity	17	Dance	Breakdancer	4	Finalist
Beau Dermott	12	Singing	Musical Theatre Singer	4	Finalist
Ben Blaque	37	Danger	Crossbow Performer	1	Eliminated
Bespoke Candi	20–28	Dance / Danger	Fire Dance Group	4	Eliminated
Bollywest Fusion	18–32	Dance	Bollywood & Hip Dance Group	4	Eliminated
Boogie Storm	17–24	Dance	Dance Group	3	Third Place
Chloe Fenton	10	Dance	Dancer	5	Eliminated
Christian Lee	45	Comedy / Magic	Comic Magician	4	Eliminated
Craig Ball	24	Singing / Comedy	Singing Impressionist	5	Finalist
Danny Beard	23	Singing	Drag Singer	4	Eliminated
Darren Altman	42	Comedy	Impressionist	1	Eliminated
Elite Squad Royalz	8-13	Dance	Street Dance Group	5	Eliminated
Flying Bebop	29–32	Dance	Drone Interactive Dancer	3	Eliminated
Jack Higgins	14	Dance	Contemporary Dancer	3	Eliminated
Jasmine Elcock	14	Singing	Singer	5	Finalist
Josh Curnow	26	Singing / Music	Singer & Pianist	3	Eliminated
Kathleen Jenkins	25	Singing	Singer	1	Eliminated
Khronos Agoria	16–19	Dance	Contemporary Dance Group	3	Eliminated
Mel & Jamie	45 & 16	Singing	Singing Duo	1	Finalist
Morgan Connie Smith	16	Singing	Singer	3	Eliminated
Mythical PSM	17–18	Dance	Dance Trio	2	Eliminated
Presentation School Choir	14–18	Singing	Choir	5	Eliminated
Rachael Wooding	37	Singing	Singer	2	Eliminated
Richard Bayton	29	Singing	Singer	1	Eliminated
Richard Jones	25	Magic	Close Up Magician	3	Winner
Shannon & Peter	46 & 50	Dance	Ballet Dance Duo	2	Finalist
Spartans Resurrection	13–23	Acrobatics	Gymnastics Group	1	Eliminated
The Collaborative Orchestra & Singers	33	Singing / Music	Choir & Orchestra	4	Eliminated
The Deep Space Deviants	46	Singing	Singer	5	Eliminated
The Garnett Family	17–46	Singing	Vocal Group	2	Eliminated
Togni Brothers	19 & 20	Acrobatics	Acrobatic Duo	5	Eliminated
Total TXS	16–19	Dance	Street Dance Group	1	Eliminated
Trip Hazard	30	Animals	Dog Act	5	Finalist
Tumar KR	19–25	Dance	Hip Hop Dance Group	4	Eliminated
Vadik & The Bear	35	Dance	Dance Entertainer	3	Eliminated
Vitaly Voronko	25	Singing / Music	Singer & Accordionist	2	Eliminated
Vox Fortura	29–37	Singing	Opera Group	4	Eliminated
Wayne Woodward	20	Singing	Jazz Singer	2	Runner-Up
Ystrad Fawr Dancers	14–17	Dance	Ballroom Dance Group	1	Eliminated
Zyrah Rose	25–28	Singing	Vocal Group	3	Eliminated

- ^1 Ages denoted for a participant(s), pertain to their final performance for this series.
- ^2 Locations denote where members from each respective group came from.
- ^3 For health & safety reason, the nature of Alex Magala's performance required these to be pre-recorded as a precaution in the live rounds.
- ^4 Locations for members of each respective
- group, or the group as a whole, were not disclosed during their time on the programme.

=== Semi-finals summary ===
Buzzed out | Judges' vote | Won the public vote
Won the judges' vote | Lost the judges' vote | Eliminated

==== Semi-final 1 (22 May) ====
- Guest performance: Cast of Motown: The Musical ("I Want You Back"/"The Love You Save"/"Get Ready"/"Dancing in the Street")

Semi-Finalist	Order	Performance Type	Buzzes and Judges' Votes				Percentage	Finished
Semi-Finalist	Order	Performance Type	Cowell	Holden	Dixon	Walliams	Percentage	Finished
Richard Bayton	1	Singer					2.6%	8th - Eliminated
Spartans Resurrection	2	Gymnastics Group					5.8%	6th - Eliminated
Kathleen Jenkins	3	Singer					15.0%	3rd (Judges' vote tied - Lost on Public vote)
Total TXS	4	Dance Group					8.4%	5th - Eliminated
Ben Blaque	5	Crossbow Performer					5.2%	7th - Eliminated
Ystrad Fawr Dancers	6	Ballroom Dance Group					2.0%	9th - Eliminated
Mel & Jamie	7	Singing Duo					21.2%	2nd (Judges' vote tied - Won on Public vote)
Darren Altman	8	Impressionist					13.0%	4th - Eliminated
100 Voices of Gospel	9	Gospel Choir					26.8%	1st (Won Public vote)

==== Semi-final 2 (23 May) ====
- Guest performance: OneRepublic ("Wherever I Go")

Semi-Finalist	Order	Performance Type	Buzzes and Judges' Votes				Percentage	Finished
Semi-Finalist	Order	Performance Type	Cowell	Holden	Dixon	Walliams	Percentage	Finished
Anne & Ian Marshall	1	Singing Duo					2.1%	8th - Eliminated
Wayne Woodward	2	Jazz Singer					25.0%	1st (Won Public vote)
Mythical PSM	3	Dance Trio					7.3%	7th - Eliminated
The Garnett Family	4	Vocal Group					7.9%	6th - Eliminated
Vitaly Voronko	5	Singer & Accordianist					1.5%	9th - Eliminated
Rachael Wooding	6	Singer					10.3%	4th - Eliminated
Another Kind of Blue	7	Projection Dance Group					8.4%	5th - Eliminated
Alex Magala	8	Sword Swallower					16.0%	3rd (Won Judges' vote)
Shannon & Peter ^{5}	9	Ballet Dance Duo					21.5%	2nd (Lost Judges' vote)

- ^5 Shannon & Peter were later sent through to the final as the judges' wildcard.

==== Semi-final 3 (24 May) ====
- Guest performance: Nick Jonas ("Jealous"/"Close")

Semi-Finalist	Order	Performance Type	Buzzes and Judges' Votes				Percentage	Finished
Semi-Finalist	Order	Performance Type	Cowell	Holden	Dixon	Walliams	Percentage	Finished
Khronos Agoria	1	Contemporary Dance Group					5.2%	7th - Eliminated
Zyrah Rose	2	Vocal Group					4.2%	8th - Eliminated
Josh Curnow	3	Singer & Pianist					8.4%	4th - Eliminated
Vadik & The Bear	4	Dance Entertainer					5.8%	6th - Eliminated
Flying Bebop ^{6}	5	Drone Interactive Dancer					1.6%	9th - Eliminated
Morgan Connie Smith	6	Singer					7.0%	5th - Eliminated
Boogie Storm	7	Dance Group					21.9%	2nd (Judges' vote tied - Won on Public vote)
Richard Jones	8	Close Up Magician					33.9%	1st (Won Public vote)
Jack Higgins	9	Contemporary Dancer					12.0%	3rd (Judges' vote tied - Lost on Public vote)

- ^6 For technical reasons, Flying Bebop's performance had to be pre-recorded before the semi-final.

==== Semi-final 4 (25 May) ====
- Guest performance: Jules, Matisse & Friends

Semi-Finalist	Order	Performance Type	Buzzes and Judges' Votes				Percentage	Finished
Semi-Finalist	Order	Performance Type	Cowell	Holden	Dixon	Walliams	Percentage	Finished
Bollywest Fusion	1	Bollywood & Hip Hop Dance Group					2.5%	8th - Eliminated
The Collaborative Orchestra & Singers	2	Choir & Orchestra					9.6%	5th - Eliminated
Bespoke Candi	3	Fire Dance Group		^{7}		^{7}	2.2%	9th - Eliminated
Vox Fortura	4	Opera Group					9.7%	4th - Eliminated
Balance Unity	5	Breakdancer	^{8}				17.3%	3rd (Won Judges' vote)
Danny Beard	6	Drag Singer					4.9%	7th - Eliminated
Christian Lee	7	Comic Magician					5.9%	6th - Eliminated
Tumar KR	8	Hip Hop Dance Group					18.2%	2nd (Lost Judges' vote)
Beau Dermott	9	Musical Theatre Singer					29.7%	1st (Won Public vote)

- ^7 Dixon pressed Walliams and Holden's buzzers during Bespoke Candi's performance, citing that Walliams told her to do it. The buzzers were never removed, however.
- ^8 Cowell did not cast his vote, due to the majority support for Balance Unity from the other judges, but admitted that his voting intention would have been for this semi-finalist.

==== Semi-final 5 (26 May) ====
- Guest performance: Fifth Harmony ("Work From Home")

Semi-Finalist	Order	Performance Type	Buzzes and Judges' Votes				Percentage	Finished
Semi-Finalist	Order	Performance Type	Cowell	Holden	Dixon	Walliams	Percentage	Finished
Elite Squad Royalz	1	Street Dance Group					6.4%	6th - Eliminated
Ana & Fia Almanda	2	Singing Duo					3.5%	8th - Eliminated
The Deep Space Deviants	3	Singer					2.1%	9th - Eliminated
Jasmine Elcock	4	Singer					23.4%	2nd (Won Judges' vote)
Trip Hazard ^{8}	5	Dog Act					15.5%	3rd (Lost Judges' vote)
Togni Brothers	6	Acrobatic Duo					6.9%	5th - Eliminated
Craig Ball	7	Singing Impressionist					24.9%	1st (Won Public vote)
Chloe Fenton	8	Dancer					5.1%	7th - Eliminated
Presentation School Choir	9	Choir					12.2%	4th - Eliminated

- ^8 Trip Hazard were later sent through to the final as the public's wildcard.

=== Public Wildcard ===
Semi-Finalist	Semi-Final	Performance Type	Percentage	Finished
Kathleen Jenkins	1	Singer	14.4%	4th
Shannon & Peter	2	Ballet Dance Duo	19.1%	3rd
Jack Higgins	3	Contemporary Dancer	12.4%	5th
Tumar KR	4	Hip Hop Dance Group	21.3%	2nd
Trip Hazard	5	Dog Act	32.8%	1st

=== Final (28 May) ===
- Guest performances: Katherine Jenkins ("Rule, Britannia!") Clean Bandit & Louisa Johnson ("Tears") Jamie Raven, Attraction, Diversity, Ashleigh and Pudsey, Kieran Gaffney, George Sampson, Old Men Grooving, Jon Clegg, Stavros Flatley, Collabro and Spelbound

Winner | Runner-up

Finalist	Order	Performance Type	Percentage	Finished
Balance Unity	1	Breakdancer	3.8%	10th
Richard Jones	2	Close Up Magician	16.7%	1st
100 Voices of Gospel	3	Gospel Choir	4.7%	8th
Alex Magala	4	Sword Swallower	4.5%	9th
Mel & Jamie	5	Singing Duo	1.9%	12th
Shannon & Peter	6	Ballet Dance Duo	3.2%	11th
Jasmine Elcock	7	Singer	11.8%	4th
Trip Hazard	8	Dog Act	7.8%	7th
Beau Dermott	9	Musical Theatre Singer	9.8%	5th
Craig Ball	10	Singing Impressionist	9.2%	6th
Boogie Storm	11	Dance Group	12.8%	3rd
Wayne Woodward	12	Jazz Singer	13.8%	2nd

== Ratings ==
Episode	Air date	Total viewers (millions)	ITV Weekly rank
Auditions 1	9 April	11.67	1
Auditions 2	16 April	12.59	1
Auditions 3	23 April	12.46	1
Auditions 4	30 April	12.05	1
Auditions 5	7 May	11.55	1
Auditions 6	14 May	10.42	1
Auditions 7	21 May	10.46	1
Semi-final 1	22 May	10.01	2
Semi-final 1 results	22 May	7.16 ^{9}	8
Semi-final 2	23 May	8.51	8
Semi-final 2 results	23 May	6.72	13
Semi-final 3	24 May	8.23	9
Semi-final 3 results	24 May	6.56	15
Semi-final 4	25 May	8.75	4
Semi-final 4 results	25 May	7.33	11
Semi-final 5	26 May	8.56	5
Semi-final 5 results	26 May	7.43	10
Final	28 May	10.48	1

- ^9 Excludes ITV+1.

== Controversy ==
Production staff working on Britain's Got More Talent created controversy after a live episode of the tenth series, when they conducted a segment to celebrate the tenth year of Britain's Got Talent with a special contest. The contest focused on the sister show's host, Stephen Mulhern, asking trivia questions about the main programme and awarding puppies to the judges for each correct answer given. After the segment was completed and the programme entered a commercial break, Simon Cowell became concerned over the well-being of the animals, and criticised staff members for a poorly conceived stunt. While Mulhern had to apologise to viewers for what was shown on television, Cowell made it clear to the producers that such a stunt would not be repeated.
