= Our Generation =

Our Generation may refer to:

- Our Generation (journal), an anarchist journal published in Montreal, founded in 1961 as a journal of the problems of achieving world peace
- Our Generation (film), a documentary about Australian aboriginal rights
- Our Generation (album), the debut album by 2017 Britain's Got Talent winner Tokio Myers
- "Our Generation", a song by Marcy Playground from their 1999 album Shapeshifter
- "Our Generation", a song by Ernie Hines
- "Our Generation (The Hope of the World)", an arrangement of the Ernie Hines song by John Legend & The Roots on their 2010 album Wake Up!
