= Brave (Beau Dermott album) =

Studio album by Beau Dermott
- Released: 1 September 2017
- Recorded: 2017
- Genre: Show tunes, pop
- Length: 49:45
- Label: Decca
- Producer: Steve Anderson

Brave is the debut studio album by English singer Beau Dermott, released by Decca Records in 2017.

== Track listing ==
All tracks produced by Steve Anderson and Cliff Masterson. All tracks are cover versions of existing songs, except for "Brave".

No.	Title	Writer(s)	Length
1.	"Defying Gravity"	Stephen Schwartz
2.	"Tears in Heaven"	Eric Clapton; Will Jennings
3.	"Sparkles"	Taneisha Jackson; Yojiro Noda
4.	"When You Wish Upon a Star"	Leigh Harline; Ned Washington
5.	"Wings"	Jasmine van den Bogaerde; Ryan Tedder
6.	"I Dreamed a Dream"	Alan Boubill; Jean-Marc Natel; Claude-Michel Schönberg; Herbert Kretzmer
7.	"Reflection"	Matthew Wilder; David Zippel
8.	"Colours of the Wind"	Alan Menken; Schwartz
9.	"When She Loved Me"	Randy Newman
10.	"Fight Song"	Rachel Platten; Dave Bassett
11.	"I'm Not That Girl"	Schwartz
12.	"Someone Like You"	Frank Wildhorn
13.	"Brave"	Daniel Curtis; Laura Curtis
14.	"Over the Rainbow"	Edgar Yipsel Harburg
Total length:			TBA

== Charts ==
Chart (2017)	Peak position
Scottish Albums (OCC)	51
UK Albums (OCC)	73
