= Hammond School, England =

Coordinates: 53.217°N 2.853°W

The Hammond School
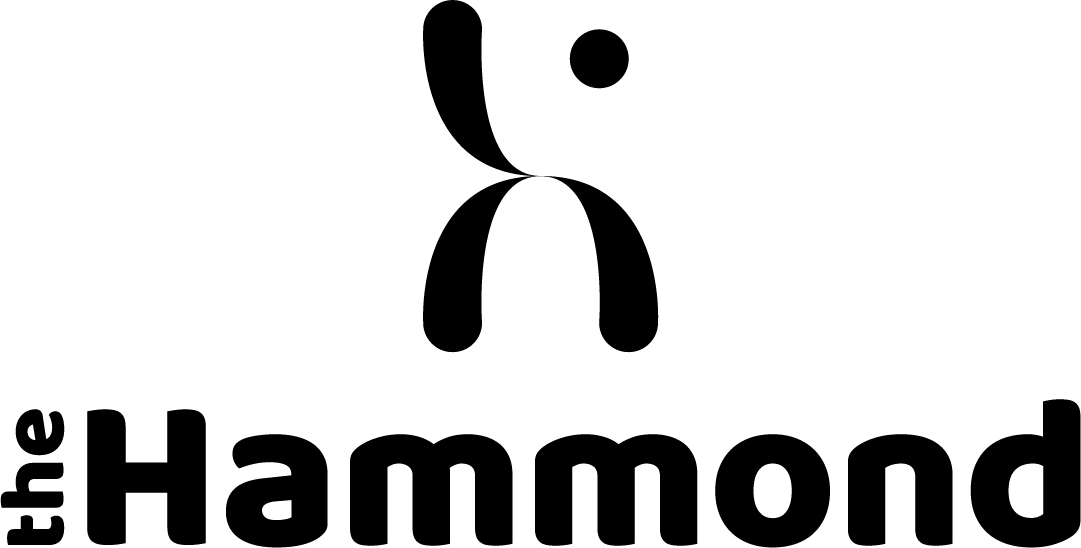

Location
- Hoole Bank; Mannings Lane; Chester, Cheshire, CH2 4ES; England

Information
- Type: Independent
- Established: 1917
- Founder: Irene Hammond
- Specialist: Arts (dance and performing arts)
- Department for Education URN: 54859 Tables
- Ofsted: Reports
- President: W. Bromley-Davenport
- Chairman of Directors: K Cowell
- Principal: Jennifer Roscoe
- Gender: Coeducational
- Age: 11+
- Website: www.thehammond.co.uk

The Hammond School is a specialist performing arts school in Chester, England.

== History ==
In 1917, Irene Hammond, a dance teacher and performer from Cheltenham, moved to Chester where she began teaching dance for Amy Broom, née Webster, who was known for her classes at the Grosvenor Ballroom. The Webster School was already an established enterprise in Chester having been run by Broom’s father, Edgar, since 1833. The school was originally opened by Louis Doré of London in 1823.

By 1919, Hammond had taken over the school, which became known as the Miss Irene Hammond School. Betty Hassall, an early student of Hammond, took over the running of the school in 1946 in partnership with Madeline Chambers. At that time, eight hundred children were enrolled at the school and attending weekly classes across Cheshire and Shropshire.

In 1951, the school leased Hampton Lodge and boarding began. The school purchased Hampton Lodge in 1953 and by 1962, the school had expanded its teaching provision into Liverpool Road where it was based until 1968. Betty Hassall was then instrumental in securing Hoole Bank House in Hoole Village for the school’s Education Department and by 1969, the entire school had moved to the site.

== Overview ==
Today, The Hammond comprises a secondary school, sixth form and university for pupils aged 11years+, which offers vocational training in dance, drama and music. It has a three-year professional course leading to the National Diploma in Professional Dance or the National Diploma in Musical Theatre, validated by Trinity College, London. Sixth form offers a BTEC in Performing Arts (acting) combined with 2 A levels. The school is accredited to the Council for Dance Education and Training and is a member of the Independent Schools Association. The Hammond is a MADE (Music and Dance Excellence) School, one of 8 schools in England funded by the Music and Dance Scheme, offering full bursaries to young people.

The school's patron is Irek Mukhamedov – ballet dancer of the Bolshoi Ballet and Royal Ballet – who teaches a dancing masterclass at the Hammond every two years.

In 2018 The Hammond was listed by The Stage as one of "Seven drama schools where academic achievement is also top class".

== Notable former pupils ==
- Sharif Afifi, actor
- Jonny Clarke, actor
- Beau Dermott, singer
- Jorgie Porter, actress and model
- Michelle Yeoh, actor
