= Missing People Choir =

2017 semi-finalist in Britain's Got Talent

The Missing People Choir
- Origin: United Kingdom
- Years active: 2014–present
- Website: www.missingpeople.org.uk

The Missing People Choir is a British group made up of people with missing loved ones, as well as supporters of the charity Missing People. The choir participated in the 2017 series of Britain's Got Talent and finished eighth. Their participation in the television show resulted in the location of multiple missing persons who were then reunited with their families.

== Choir ==
The choir was founded in 2014 by music producers James Hawkins and Clare Cook with the aim of bringing together families with missing loved ones. In addition to emotional expression and support, choir members hope to reach people who may have information about those who are missing; their performances include showing their names and faces to the audience. One of the members is the sister of Richey Edwards of the band Manic Street Preachers, who disappeared in 1995; another is the father of Claudia Lawrence, who disappeared in 2009.

In December 2017, the choir released a charity Christmas album called Stand Together with nine other inspirational choirs, dubbed Choirs With Purpose. In December 2018, they released a single, "I Miss You".

Following a short hiatus, the choir was reformed in 2021 under its new Choir Director, Nina Bromham.

== Britain's Got Talent ==
The choir auditioned for the 11th series of Britain's Got Talent in 2017, performing a song written by James Hawkins, Simon Rhodes and lyrics by Peter Boxell, father of Lee Boxell who disappeared in 1988. They received four yeses and advanced to the live semi-finals, where they performed "Wings" by Birdy, with one member singing the first verse and the rest of the choir joining in for the chorus. In an emotional performance, they held lights during their performance, and the audience was also given lights to hold. They finished second in the semi-final and immediately advanced to the final, which they were then favoured to win.

During the final on 3 June, they performed "With You" from the musical Ghost. They finished eighth overall.

After their televised performance, a missing boy called his mother after seeing her singing in the choir, another missing person was reunited with their family, and information was also received about two others.
