= Tokio Myers =

British pianist and record producer (born 1984)

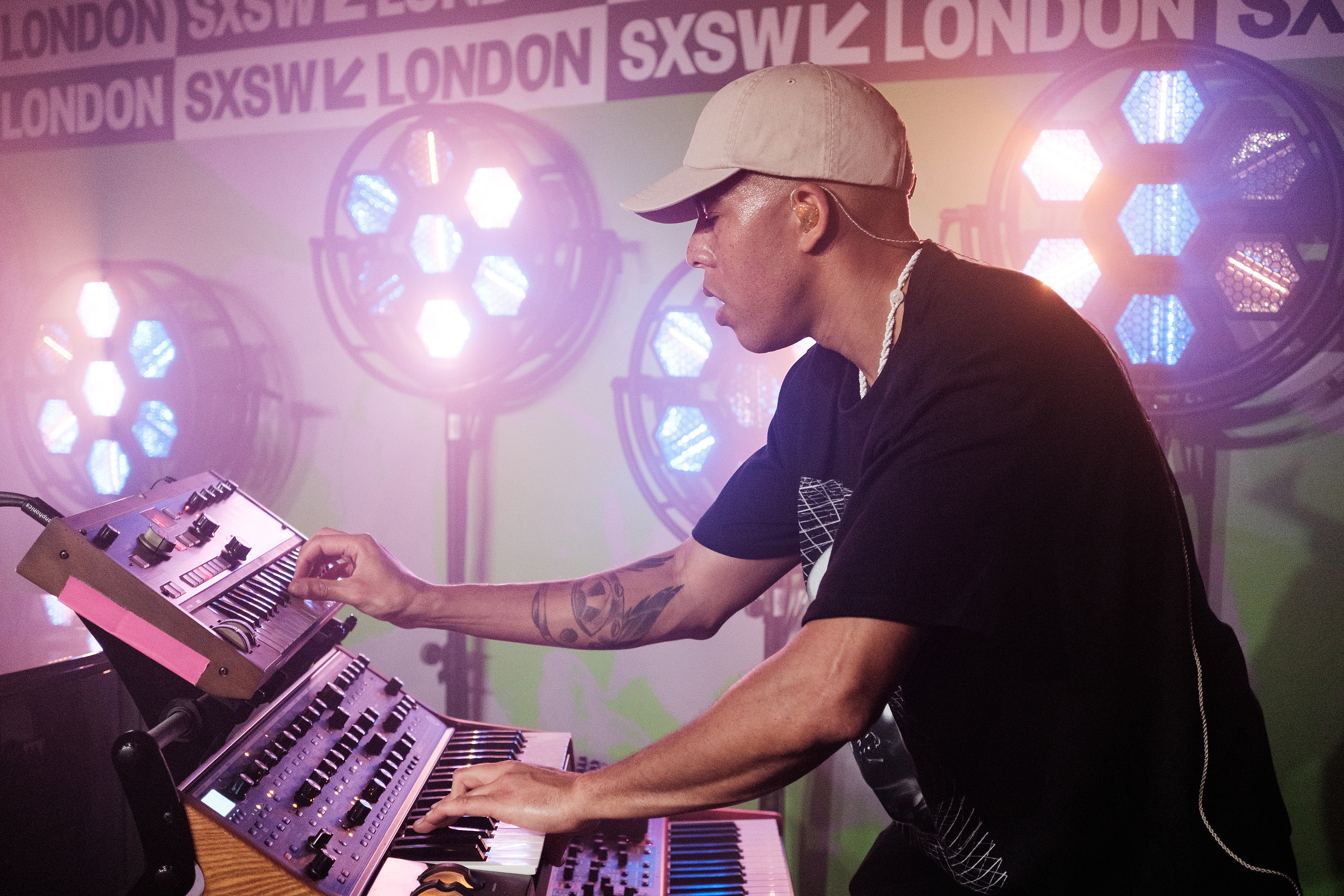
- Tokio Myers at the SXSW London, June 2025

Background information
- Born: Torville Ashburn M. Jones; 6 April 1984 (age 42); London, England
- Genres: Classical; alternative R&B
- Occupations: Musician, record producer
- Instruments: Piano, keyboards, synthesizer, drums
- Years active: 2000s–present
- Labels: BMG; Syco Entertainment
- Website: tokiomyers.com

Torville Ashburn M. Jones (born 6 April 1984), better known by the stage name Tokio Myers, is an English musician and record producer best known for his work as a pianist. He won the reality show Britain's Got Talent in 2017, after which he released many of his independent compositions, including his debut album Our Generation.

== Early life ==
Myers was born Torville Ashburn M. Jones in London on 6 April 1984. He is of West Indian descent. As an 11-year-old student at St George's Catholic School in Maida Vale, he witnessed the murder of the school's Irish headmaster Philip Lawrence at the hands of a local youth branch of the Wo Shing Wo gang, and was ushered to safety inside the building by his music teacher. He later studied with a full scholarship at the Royal College of Music.

== Career ==
Myers has previously supported Kanye West, The Police, and Amy Winehouse when he toured with producer Mr Hudson's band Mr Hudson and the Library. Myers also supported Lianne La Havas on her 2016 European Tour.

He used synths and a sample pad as part of his performances, fusing classical roots with dance and pop genres. He was signed to a publishing deal with BMG.

In June 2017, Myers featured in and co-produced a charity single of "Bridge over Troubled Water" to raise money for those impacted by the Grenfell Tower fire, which happened in North Kensington on 14 June 2017.

On 13 October 2017, he released his official debut single, entitled "Bloodstream", which is his studio rendition of his audition performance at Britain's Got Talent. It was also announced as being the lead single from his debut album, entitled Our Generation, which being released in November 2017.

On 5 November 2017, Myers performed as a guest on The X Factor, performing "Angel", and he returned in the final, to duet with Kevin Davy White performing "Fastlove, Pt. 1" by George Michael.

On 4 February 2019, Myers competed in America's Got Talent: The Champions. The first time travelling to the US, his performance consisted of performing a medley of Claude Debussy's "Clair de lune" and Ed Sheeran's "Bloodstream" on the piano and drums. He failed to make it to the final. He returned in the finale as a guest along with Voices of Hope Children's Choir, performing "All We Got" by Robin Schulz.

On 11 September 2019, Myers performed as a guest on America's Got Talent along with Stewart Copeland, performing "Safe and Sound". English singer Grace Davies performed the vocals.

== Discography ==
=== Studio albums ===
Title	Details	Peak chart positions	Certifications
Title	Details	UK	Certifications
Our Generation	Released: 17 November 2017; Label: Syco; Formats: CD, digital download	4	BPI: Gold

=== Singles ===
==== As lead artist ====
Title	Year	Peak chart positions	Album
Title	Year	UK	Album
"Bloodstream"	2017	—	Our Generation
"Baltimore"	2017	—	Our Generation
"Angel"	2017	61	Our Generation
"Children"	2017	—	Our Generation
"Enter the Jungle" (featuring Akala)	2019	—	Non-album single
"—" denotes a recording that did not chart or was not released in that territory.

==== As featured artist ====
Title	Year	Peak chart positions
Title	Year	UK
"Bridge over Troubled Water" (as part of Artists for Grenfell)	2017	1

=== Remixes ===
List of remixes, showing original artists and year released
Title	Year	Original Artist(s)
"I Miss You"	2017	Clean Bandit (featuring Julia Michaels)

Preceded by Richard Jones	Winner of Britain's Got Talent; 2017	Succeeded by Lost Voice Guy
