= Missing People =

United Kingdom missing persons charity

- Founded: April 1993
- Founder: Mary Asprey OBE and Janet Newman OBE
- Type: Charity
- Purpose: Charity providing support to persons who run away or go missing.
- Headquarters: UK
- Location: East Sheen, London SW14
- Region served: UK and worldwide
- Interim CEO: Ross Miller
- Key people: Patrons: The Duchess of Gloucester, Trevor McDonald, Richard Branson, Stephen Fry, Lorraine Kelly, John Stapleton
- Employees: 63
- Volunteers: 450
- Website: www.missingpeople.org.uk

Missing People (previously known as National Missing Persons Helpline) is a national organisation in the United Kingdom that offers assistance to people who run away and/or go missing and their families. It is a registered charity under English law.

== History ==
=== Early years (1986–1989) ===
Following the high-profile disappearance of estate agent, Suzy Lamplugh, from Fulham in July 1986, two sisters, Janet Newman and Mary Asprey, co-founded the National Missing Persons Helpline. The helpline was initially part of the Suzy Lamplugh Trust, but later they became separate organisations.

=== Helpline (1990–1992) ===
From a bedroom at the sisters' home in East Sheen, south west London, a start-up service was formed in early 1990.

The service initially used the Freefone number 0500 700 700 (this number continued in operation until June 2017, when Ofcom closed down all remaining 0500 numbers; from 2009 onwards, the new 116000 number operated in parallel). Initially Mary and Janet and a small team of volunteers simply comforted callers to the helpline. However, they soon realised families wanted more than just telephone support.

In 1992, having re-mortgaged their houses to cover the cost, Mary and Janet applied to register National Missing Persons Helpline (NMPH) as a charity.

=== Expansion (1993) ===
By the time it became a registered charity in April 1993, NMPH needed new offices to provide a complete range of services for relatives, enabling the charity to both find and support. This expansion was greatly helped by founders of the Big Issue, who secured premises in Mortlake. Missing People is still based there today. ITN's Sir Trevor McDonald became a Patron in 1993, after witnessing the way families struggled when their loved ones went missing. Diana, Princess of Wales visited their office in the first year of operation.

=== Getting the message home (1994) ===
In February 1994, the resources of NMPH were stretched to the limit following the arrest of Fred West and the discoveries at 25 Cromwell Street, Gloucester. Calls to the helpline from relatives of missing people trebled and extra volunteers had to be brought in to answer the phones. New callers reported relatives missing for the first time, even though some had vanished ten years ago or even more. Distressed families already in touch with the helpline called again, in case their missing relative might figure in the investigation. The police directed anxious families to NMPH for comfort and support.

Gloucestershire Police called too, seeking help on identifying the bodies found at Cromwell Street and elsewhere. They requested information on women reported missing from Worcestershire and Gloucestershire in the 1970s and 1980s. Some 390 names were supplied including Alison Chambers and Carol Cooper who were later identified as victims. At the same time, details mentioned by Fred West were passed to NMPH for checking against their database. One result of this was the identification of Juanita Mott another of the victims discovered at Cromwell Street. A positive side effect of the charities role in the investigation was the reunion of 110 non-victim families in less than two months.

On 27 June 1994 the charity took over the Message Home Helpline from the Mothers' Union, allowing adult missing people to pass a message home.

=== Recognition (1996–1998) ===
In 1996 Asprey and Newman were honoured for their services to charity with OBEs. In 1998 both were honoured with the "UK Women of Europe Award" and in the same year given the European Women of Achievement Humanitarianism Award and The Rotary Foundation's prestigious Paul Harris Fellowships.

=== Pioneering work (1999–2004) ===
In 2001 the NMPH launched the pilot "The Missing from Care Project", funded by the Department of Health Social Care group. The goal was to produce a database on runaways from Foster care, and to detect and possibly patterns that may explain why children are running away.

In 2003 Mary and Janet were invited by The Queen and the Duke of Edinburgh to a reception at Buckingham Palace to mark the contribution of Pioneers to the life of the Nation.

Lost from View was published in March 2003, a research paper that was funded by the Nuffield Foundation. Researchers from the University of York worked in partnership with NMPH to research why people go missing. At the time it was the extensive study of missing persons in the UK and drew on data from nearly 2,000 adults and children who had contacted NMPH.

In 2004 the NMPH launched their Runaway helpline, taking over 45,000 calls in 2004 and 57,000 calls in 2005. The helpline was funded by the charity through fundraising.

=== Financial problems (2005–2006) ===
In 2005 the charity announced that unless long term funding was secured, the helpline would have to close. This announcement came after cuts to government funding that meant they had a shortfall of £500,000. The annual Home Office grant that NMPH previously received amounting to £350,000 was cut. As was the £150,000 annual grant from the Department for Education. The charity also claimed that their regular donors had begun supporting 2004 Indian Ocean earthquake and tsunami relief work, causing a drop in the helpline donations.

Following the appeal NMPH was able to secure £60,000 from the government in 2006, and the Home Office pledged around £300,000 in extra funding.

Sir Norman Wakefield, one of the charities donors, became an advisor to help guide the charity through a restructuring. In September 2005, Paul Tuohy joined the charity as their first chief executive. The charity reformed its board of trustees and started a considerable process of strategic planning.

=== Relaunch (2007–2008) ===
In May 2007 – 2008 the charity relaunched as "Missing People". Tuohy explained this change was intended to make it clear that the charity provided more than just a helpline. Also in May, less than one week after her disappearance, missing three-year-old Madeleine McCann had become headline news around the globe. On International Missing Children's Day (26 May) an appeal by the charity was projected onto Marble Arch to highlight Madeleine's disappearance and the plight of missing children across the UK. In August Missing People launched the first comprehensive online "missing map" in the UK and Missing People TV' – the first online channel featuring appeals of missing people. In October the charity along with other NGOs from the English Coalition for Runaway Children asked the government to "stop missing the missing issue". This led to the government developing a strategy on the protection of young runaways for the first time ever. In 2007 the charity also teamed up with the police to hold their first joint conference on "missing". Delegates came from across the globe came to Blackpool to debate and learn about the latest developments. In November 2007 Missing People won two awards for its website – which received more than 40 million hits in its first year. In December the BBC launched Reunited – a season of programmes about family members seeking to contact missing relatives and the complex reasons people run away.

=== Missing People (March 2008) ===
In March 2008 hundreds of families of the missing joined to march through London to highlight the impact of someone going missing from their family. They called for further government support for the Missing People's charity. The march was organised and led by Nicki Durbin, mother of missing Luke Durbin, who went missing after a night out in Ipswich, Suffolk in 2006; Val Nettles, mother of missing Damien Nettles, who was last seen in Cowes on the Isle of Wight in 1996 and Jill Blonsky. Radiohead supported the charity with the donation of an exclusive one-off remix tape.

In April 2008 Missing Live aired on BBC One. More than 100 people were found over the four-week show's airing. In June 2008 the charity received a Department for Children, Schools and Families (DCSF) grant of £310,000. Five new trustees were appointed, which led to a shortlisting at the Third Sector Awards 2009 for most improved Trustee Board. In October 2009 Missing People worked with Iceland supermarket to launch milk carton appeals for the missing. Following on from the success of a previous initiative with Iceland which had helped to find more than 17 people across millions of cartons. The first new appeal was for Andrew Gosden, a 14-year-old boy last seen at King's Cross Station. In December 2009 Missing People launched the first report into the experiences of, and impacts on, the families of missing people called "Living in Limbo". Also in December Missing People teamed up with 95.8 Capital FM to launch the Runaway Helpline text service, the first free helpline text service for young people, which was funded by Vodafone Foundation.

=== 116xxx telephone number issued (2009) ===
In 2009, Ofcom introduced the first harmonised European numbers for harmonised services of social value, allocating 116 000 to the Missing People service. This number is free to call from mobiles and landlines.

=== 0500 telephone number withdrawn (2017) ===
The existing 0500 700 700 telephone number continued to operate in parallel with the new 116 000 number for many years. Finally, in June 2017, Ofcom withdrew all 0500 numbers, and the 0500 line was no more. The 0500 number had been free to call from landlines but had cost up to 40p per minute to call from a mobile telephone.

== Working with the police ==
Missing People works in partnership with police forces and other agencies across the UK to help find missing children and adults and support their family or carer. Missing people offers publicity opportunities to police forces and at the request of the police Missing People can send a missing person a text message informing them about the charity and the support they can offer. These services are available at no direct cost to police forces, the missing person or their family.

== Events ==
International Missing Children's Day is one day a year when people remember missing children and their families. The charity mark this day by holding their Big Tweet for Missing Children. For 24 hours the charity uses Twitter to publicise missing children appeals. The charity tweets a different missing child appeal every 30 minutes for 24 hours and are supported in this by a range of celebrities and organisations. In 2013 The Big Tweet for Missing Children was sponsored by The Sun newspaper and celebrities including Simon Cowell and Stephen Fry endorsed the campaign making it the most successful Big Tweet in the charity's history.

Miles for Missing People is an annual running event held by the charity Missing People. The popular event, includes a 10K, a 3K and a kids run as well as entertainment and family activities, is held on or around 25 May to mark International Missing Children's Day. Hundreds of supporters and families of missing people join to participate in the races and fundraise for the charity raising thousands of pounds for the charity's work.

The Missing People Cycle Challenge takes place in June or July each year and involves groups of cyclists cycling from Edinburgh to London over a five-day period to help support the families of Missing People.

The Missing People Choir was founded by the charity in 2014.
