= Britain's Got Talent series 11 =

Britain's Got Talent
- Series 11
- Presented by: Ant & Dec (ITV); Stephen Mulhern (ITV2)
- Judges: David Walliams; Alesha Dixon; Amanda Holden; Simon Cowell
- Winner: Tokio Myers
- Runner-up: Issy Simpson

Release
- Original network: ITV; ITV2 (BGMT)
- Original release: 15 April – 3 June 2017

Series chronology
- ← Previous; Series 10 Next → Series 12

Judges and Presenter(s) for Britain's Got Talent Series 11

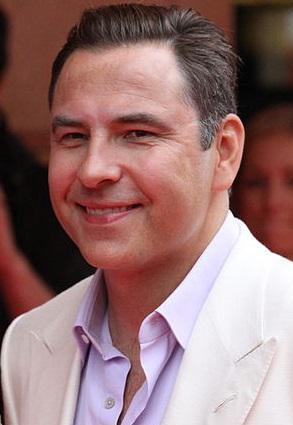
David Walliams

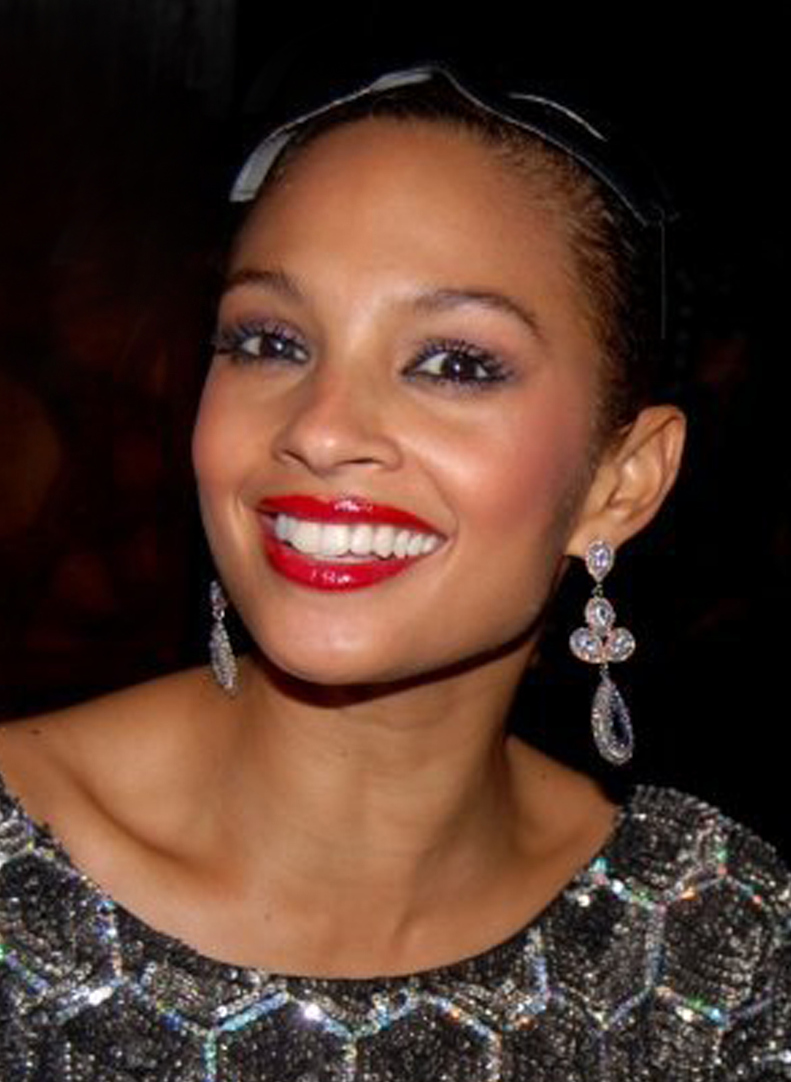
Alesha Dixon

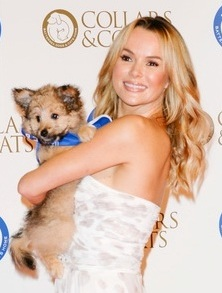
Amanda Holden

Simon Cowell

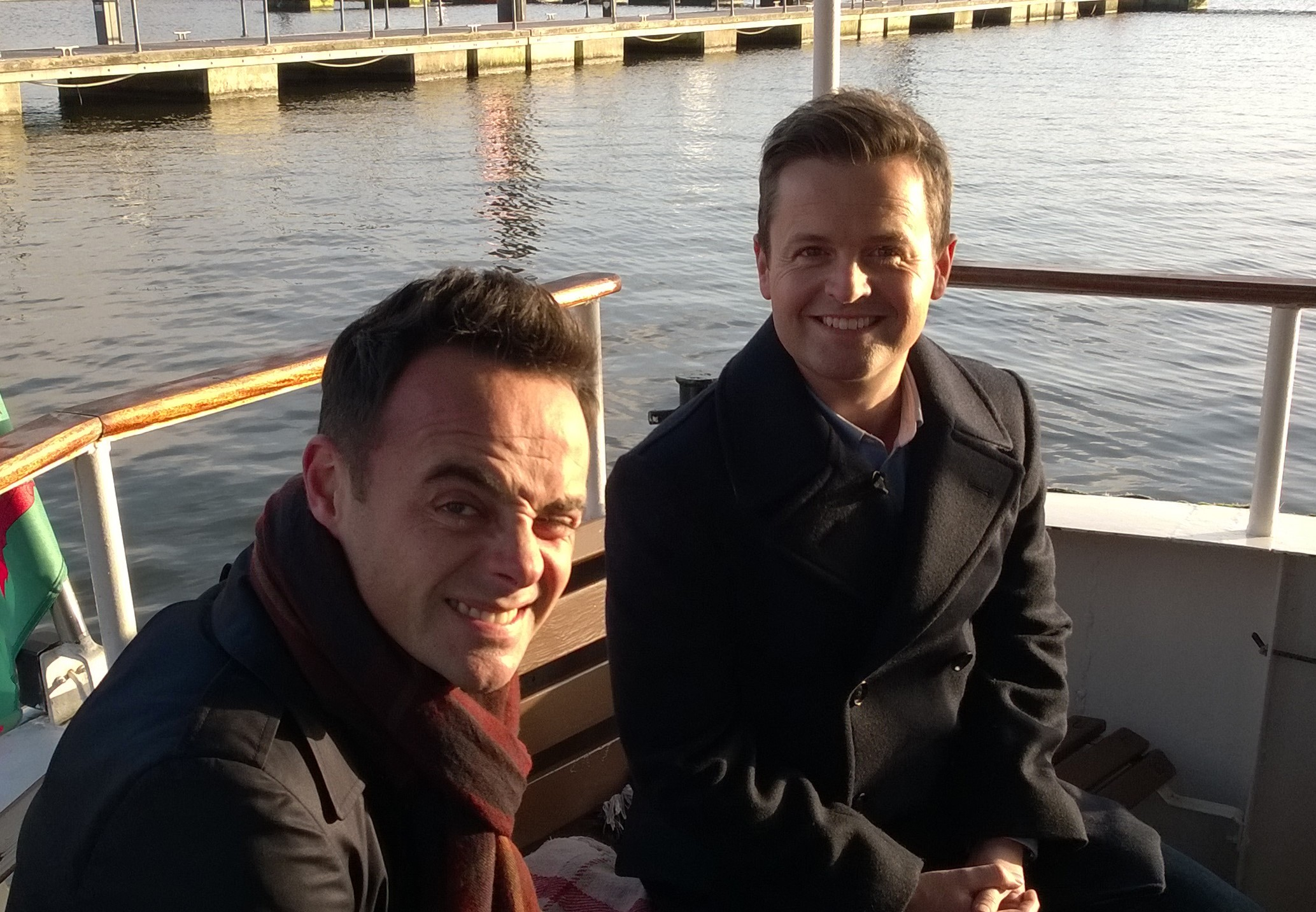
Ant & Dec (ITV1)

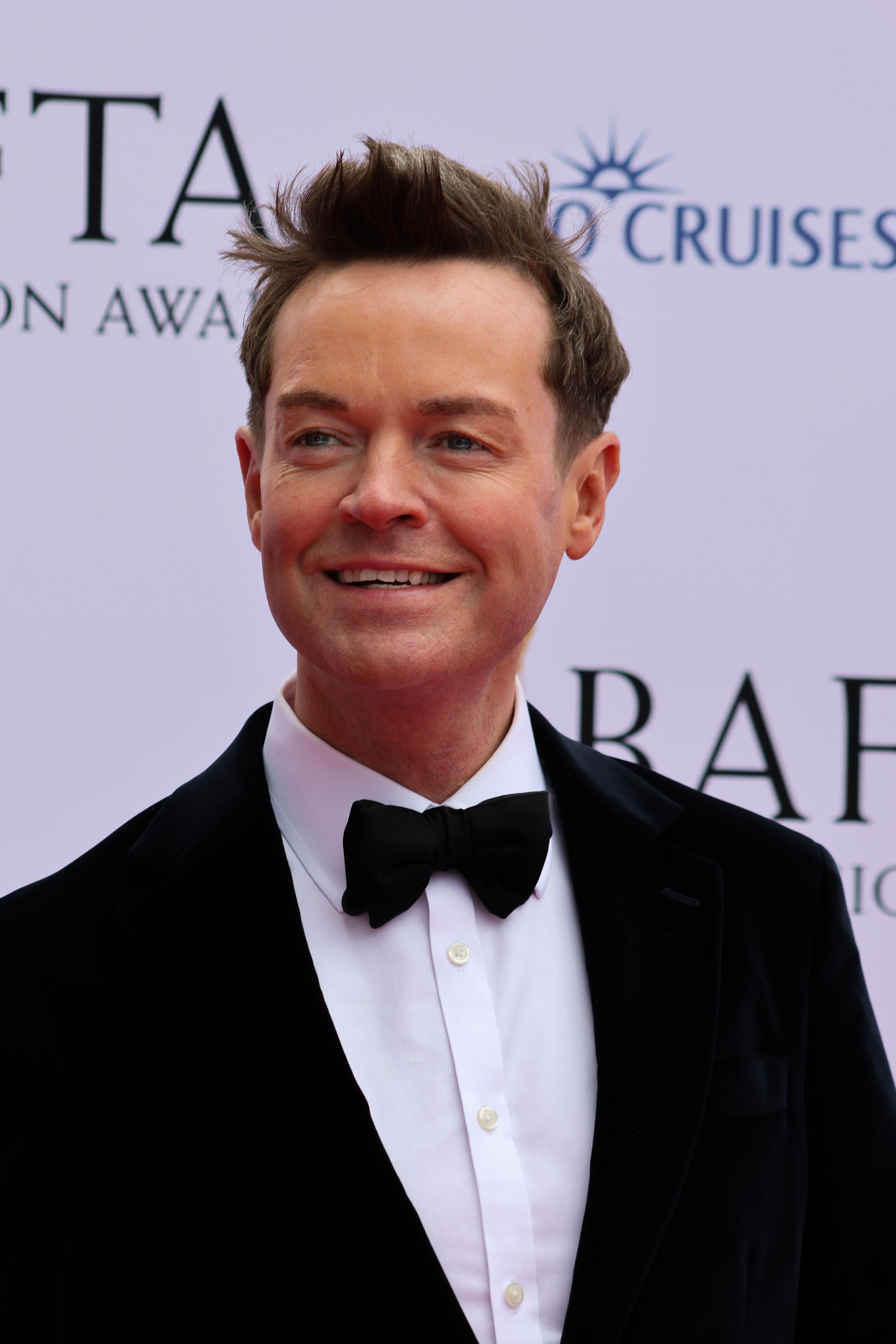
Stephen Mulhern (ITV2)

The eleventh series of British talent competition programme Britain's Got Talent was broadcast on ITV, from 15 April to 3 June 2017; because the One Love Manchester concert was to take place on 4 June, the live final was brought forward a day to avoid clashing with it. Following the closure of Fountain Studios the previous year, the live episodes were broadcast from Elstree Studios. The change in location allowed for a revamp of the studio used by both the main programme and its sister show, Britain's Got More Talent.

For the first time in eleven years, this series featured no judges' vote for each semi-final – instead the acts getting the highest and second-highest tally of public votes would move on to the live final; after the series' conclusion, Cowell admitted that he disliked this format change. In addition to the judges not voting for an act, the Public Wildcard format was dropped from the show, while the number of acts making it into the semi-finals was reduced to 40, returning to the original semi-final format used prior to the sixth series.

The eleventh series was won by pianist Tokio Myers, with magician Issy Simpson finishing in second place and comedian Daliso Chaponda third. During its broadcast, the series averaged around 9.1 million viewers.

== Series overview ==
Following open auditions held the previous year between October and December, the Judges' audition took place between January and February 2017, within Blackpool, London, Birmingham and Salford. Along with discontinuing the use of the Public wildcard format, production staff changed the rules to suspend the use of the Judges' vote – the change meant that the voting system would be purely conducted by a public vote, with the semi-finalists receiving the highest and second-highest tally of votes respectively automatically securing a place in the live final. This change in format was not announced until 27 May 2017; on 5 June, following the conclusion of the eleventh series, Cowell admitted he disliked this change and had production staff informed it would not be used for the next series.

Of the participants that took part, only forty made it into the five live semi-finals – of these acts, singer Sarah Ikumu, dance group MerseyGirls, comedian Daliso Chaponda, comic magician Matt Edwards, and singer Kyle Tomlinson, each received a golden buzzer during their auditions – with eight appearing in each one – returning to the original arrangement before the sixth series – and eleven of these acts making it into the live final; the wildcard act chosen by the judges was Sarah Ikumu, after she placed 3rd in the public vote in the third semi-final. The following below lists the results of each participant's overall performance in this series:

Winner | Runner-up | Finalist | Semi-finalist
Judges' Wildcard Finalist | Golden Buzzer Audition

Participant	Age(s) ^{1}	Genre	Performance Type	Semi-final	Result
Angelicus Celtis	12–17	Singing	Choir	4	Eliminated
Code 3	14–16	Dance	Dance Trio	5	Eliminated
Daliso Chaponda	37	Comedy	Stand Up Comedian	5	Third Place
David Geaney	22	Dance	Tap Dancer	3	Eliminated
Destiny Chukunyere	14	Singing	Singer	2	Eliminated
Dizzy Twilight	65	Music	DJ	2	Eliminated
DNA	29 & 43	Magic	Mentalist Duo	1	Finalist
Empire Dance Crew	15–27	Dance	Street Dance Group	1	Eliminated
Grace & Ali	17 & 16	Dance	Contemporary Dance Duo	2	Eliminated
Harry Gardner	16	Singing / Music	Singer & Pianist	2	Eliminated
Issy Simpson	8	Magic	Illusionist	2	Runner-Up
Jamie Lee Harrison	24	Singing	Singer	5	Eliminated
Jay Wynn	36	Singing	Singer	3	Eliminated
Jess Robinson	34	Singing / Comedy	Singing Impressionist	5	Eliminated
John Parnell	63	Variety	Hula Hoop Artist	4	Eliminated
Jonny Awsum	39	Comedy / Singing	Comic Singer	4	Eliminated
Josephine Lee	30	Magic	Magician	3	Eliminated
Kyle Tomlinson	15	Singing	Singer	1	Finalist
Leah Barniville	14	Singing	Classical Singer	2	Eliminated
London School of Bollywood	18–27	Dance	Bollywood Dance Group	3	Eliminated
Lords of Strut	35 & 36	Comedy / Dance	Comic Dance Duo	5	Eliminated
Martin & Faye	47 & 10	Singing	Opera Singing Duo	3	Eliminated
Matt Edwards	34	Comedy / Magic	Comic Magician	2	Finalist
MerseyGirls ^{2}	14–17	Dance	Contemporary Dance Group	4	Finalist
Miss Treat Vibe	19–24	Singing	Girl Band	1	Eliminated
Missing People Choir	32–71	Singing	Choir	5	Finalist
Ned Woodman	8	Comedy	Stand Up Comedian	3	Finalist
Niels Harder	26	Comedy / Magic	Comic Magician	1	Eliminated
Paws With Soul	24–29	Dance	Dance Group	4	Eliminated
PC Dan	33	Dance	Bodypopper	1	Eliminated
Perfect Pitch Creation	8–14	Singing	Choir	5	Eliminated
Reuben Gray	16	Singing / Music	Singer & Guitarist	4	Eliminated
Ryan Tracey	35	Variety	Balloon Artist	4	Eliminated
Sarah Ikumu	16	Singing	Singer	3	Finalist
St. Patrick's Junior Choir Drumgreenagh	8–12	Singing	Choir	1	Eliminated
TapTastik	19–62	Dance	Tap Dance Group	2	Eliminated
The Pensionalities ^{2}	84 & 75	Singing	Singing Duo	4	Finalist
TNG Characters	16–25	Dance	Dance Group	5	Eliminated
Tokio Myers	32	Music	Pianist	3	Winner
Tyrone & Mina	36 & 35	Danger	Knife Throwing Duo	1	Eliminated

- ^1 Ages denoted for a participant(s), pertain to their final performance for this series.
- ^2 Each respective participant(s) auditioned under a different name, before changing them for their semi-final appearance.

=== Semi-finals summary ===
Buzzed out | Advanced – 1st in public vote | Advanced – 2nd in public vote
Eliminated – 3rd in public vote | Eliminated

==== Semi-final 1 (29 May) ====
- Guest performance: Alfie Boe & Dame Vera Lynn ("We'll Meet Again")

Semi-finalist	Order	Performance Type	Buzzes				Percentage	Finished
Semi-finalist	Order	Performance Type	Cowell	Holden	Dixon	Walliams	Percentage	Finished
St. Patrick's Junior Choir Drumgreenagh	1	Choir					12.3%	4th – Eliminated
PC Dan	2	Bodypopper					6.7%	5th – Eliminated
Niels Harder	3	Comic Magician					0.9%	8th – Eliminated
Kyle Tomlinson	4	Singer					28.1%	2nd (Won Public Vote)
Empire Dance Crew	5	Street Dance Group					2.4%	7th – Eliminated
DNA	6	Mentalist Duo					32.0%	1st (Won Public Vote)
Tyrone & Mina	7	Knife Throwing Duo					3.0%	6th – Eliminated
Miss Treat Vibe	8	Girl Band					14.6%	3rd – (Lost Public Vote)

==== Semi-final 2 (30 May) ====
- Guest performance: Camila Cabello ("I Have Questions"/"Crying in the Club")

Semi-finalist	Order	Performance Type	Buzzes				Percentage	Finished
Semi-finalist	Order	Performance Type	Cowell	Holden	Dixon	Walliams	Percentage	Finished
Destiny Chukunyere	1	Singer					4.2%	6th – Eliminated
Dizzy Twilight	2	DJ					1.6%	8th – Eliminated
Harry Gardner	3	Singer & Pianist					12.9%	4th – Eliminated
Issy Simpson	4	Illusionist					26.6%	1st (Won Public Vote)
Matt Edwards	5	Comic Magician					23.4%	2nd (Won Public Vote)
Leah Barniville	6	Classical Singer					12.1%	5th – Eliminated
Grace & Ali	7	Contemporary Dance Duo					17.3%	3rd (Lost Public Vote)
TapTastik	8	Tap Dance Group					1.9%	7th – Eliminated

==== Semi-final 3 (31 May) ====
- Guest performance: Cast of Bat Out of Hell: The Musical ("I'd Do Anything for Love (But I Won't Do That)"/"Dead Ringer for Love")

Semi-finalist	Order	Performance Type	Buzzes				Percentage	Finished
Semi-finalist	Order	Performance Type	Cowell	Holden	Dixon	Walliams	Percentage	Finished
Josephine Lee	1	Magician					8.9%	4th – Eliminated
London School of Bollywood	2	Bollywood Dance Group					4.2%	6th – Eliminated
Martin & Faye	3	Opera Singing Duo					6.2%	5th – Eliminated
Ned Woodman	4	Stand Up Comedian					21.8%	2nd (Won Public Vote)
Jay Wynn	5	Singer					1.3%	8th – Eliminated
Sarah Ikumu ^{3}	6	Singer					16.8%	3rd (Lost Public Vote)
David Geaney	7	Tap Dancer					4.1%	7th – Eliminated
Tokio Myers	8	Pianist					36.7%	1st (Won Public Vote)

- ^3 Sarah Ikumu was later sent through to the final as the judges' wildcard.

==== Semi-final 4 (1 June) ====
- Guest performance: Richard Jones

Semi-finalist	Order	Performance Type	Buzzes				Percentage	Finished
Semi-finalist	Order	Performance Type	Cowell	Holden	Dixon	Walliams	Percentage	Finished
Paws With Soul	1	Dance Group					2.6%	7th – Eliminated
Angelicus Celtis	2	Choir					7.5%	5th – Eliminated
John Parnell	3	Hula Hoop Artist	^{1}				2.5%	8th – Eliminated
Reuben Gray	4	Singer & Guitarist					11.5%	3rd (Lost Public Vote)
Ryan Tracey	5	Balloonist					2.8%	6th – Eliminated
The Pensionalities	6	Singing Duo					33.0%	1st (Won Public Vote)
Jonny Awsum	7	Comic Singer					10.5%	4th – Eliminated
MerseyGirls	8	Contemporary Dance Group					29.6%	2nd (Won Public Vote)

- ^1 Cowell asked for his X to be removed during the comments.

==== Semi-final 5 (2 June) ====
- Guest performance: 5 After Midnight ("Up In Here")

Semi-finalist	Order	Performance Type	Buzzes				Percentage	Finished
Semi-finalist	Order	Performance Type	Cowell	Holden	Dixon	Walliams	Percentage	Finished
Jess Robinson	1	Singing Impressionist					7.7%	5th – Eliminated
Perfect Pitch Creation	2	Choir					4.7%	7th – Eliminated
Code 3	3	Dance Trio					3.7%	8th – Eliminated
Daliso Chaponda	4	Stand Up Comedian					41.1%	1st (Won Public Vote)
Missing People Choir	5	Choir					13.0%	2nd (Won Public Vote)
TNG Characters	6	Dance Group					5.8%	6th – Eliminated
Jamie Lee Harrison	7	Singer					12.8%	3rd (Lost Public Vote)
Lords of Strut	8	Comic Dance Duo					11.2%	4th – Eliminated

=== Final (3 June) ===
- Guest performance: Diversity

Winner | Runner-up

Finalist	Order	Performance Type	Percentage	Finished
The Pensionalities	1	Singing Duo	6.9%	5th
MerseyGirls	2	Contemporary Dance Group	5.1%	9th
Kyle Tomlinson	3	Singer	6.7%	6th
Ned Woodman	4	Stand Up Comedian	3.2%	10th
DNA	5	Mentalist Duo	3.0%	11th
Matt Edwards	6	Comic Magician	7.9%	4th
Missing People Choir	7	Choir	5.2%	8th
Sarah Ikumu	8	Singer	5.6%	7th
Daliso Chaponda	9	Stand Up Comedian	14.7%	3rd
Issy Simpson	10	Illusionist	17.5%	2nd
Tokio Myers	11	Pianist	24.2%	1st

== Ratings ==
Episode	Air date	Total viewers (millions)	ITV Weekly rank
Auditions 1	15 April	11.35	1
Auditions 2	22 April	11.62	2
Auditions 3	29 April	10.79	1
Auditions 4	6 May	11.69	1
Auditions 5	13 May	10.97	1
Auditions 6	20 May	11.39	1
Auditions 7	27 May	10.69	1
Semi-final 1	29 May	9.75	2
Semi-final 1 results	29 May	7.19	12
Semi-final 2	30 May	7.90	10
Semi-final 2 results	30 May	6.44	16
Semi-final 3	31 May	8.24	8
Semi-final 3 results	31 May	6.78	14
Semi-final 4	1 June	7.54	11
Semi-final 4 results	1 June	7.09	13
Semi-final 5	2 June	8.10	9
Semi-final 5 results	2 June	6.51	15
Final	3 June	10.07	1
