= Ruby Red Performers =

English burlesque dancing troupe

The Ruby Red Performers are an amateur burlesque dancing troupe from the English seaside town of Withernsea, near Hull.

== Biography ==
In April 2015, twelve members of the Ruby Red Performers appeared on series 9 of the primetime ITV variety show Britain's Got Talent. They attended an audition held in the Lowry Theatre in MediaCity Salford where they performed a routine dressed as 1950s cleaning women dancing to Queen's "I Want to Break Free". Early on into their routine, Simon Cowell pressed his buzzer to indicate that he did not like the act, but shortly afterwards there was a tempo change in the routine and the women stripped down to large pairs of underwear, much to the delight of the audience and judges.

After their performance, Cowell admitted that he had pressed his buzzer too early and suggested that the British Royal Family might like to see the act perform. They were given four 'yes' votes by the panel, allowing them to progress in the competition.

On 25 May 2015, The Ruby Red Performers performed live in the first semi final along with eight other acts but came in last place in the public vote, therefore not advancing to the final. The group began their routine dressed as lollipop ladies before stripping down to black underwear and exploding bras.

Their routine received favourable comments from the judges but they were criticised for their physical appearance on Twitter by columnist Katie Hopkins and former Strictly Come Dancing dancer James Jordan, with these comments being picked up by the national press. Jordan described the Ruby Reds as "fat old birds" whilst Hopkins, who is known for her outspoken vitriolic comments, said their act was about women "being confident about their bodies and eating pork pies". The group responded by tweeting a photograph of them all on the bus back to Withernsea eating pork pies.

The group progressed to the semi-final, but did not reach the final of the competition.

=== Other appearances ===
On 13 April 2015, following their debut performance on Britain's Got Talent, two members of the group gave their first television interview to Amanda Holden and Phillip Schofield on the live daytime magazine show This Morning. The group's leader, who goes by the name of Ruby, presented Holden with a pair of the nipple tassels worn by the ladies during their routine and Holden tried them out live on air.

The group have continued to perform after their departure from Britain's Got Talent.
