= Beau Dermott =

- Born: 28 October 2003 (age 22); Widnes, Cheshire, England
- Genres: Musical theatre; Pop
- Occupation: Singer
- Label: Decca Records

Beau Dermott (born 28 October 2003) is a British musical theatre singer. She rose to fame in 2016 during the tenth series of Britain's Got Talent finishing in fifth place.

== Career ==
Beau Dermott auditioned for the tenth series of Britain's Got Talent, singing "Defying Gravity" from the musical Wicked. She was judge Amanda Holden's Golden Buzzer act, securing herself a place in the live rounds of the competition. Her cousin, dancer Jack Higgins, also took part in this series.

She signed with Decca Records and her first album, Brave, was released on 1 September 2017.

Beau participated in the 2019 young voices at London's O_{2} arena.

== Personal life ==
Beau Dermott lives in Widnes, Cheshire. She attended The Hammond School in Chester. Beau's father died in February 2018.

== Discography ==
Title	Album details	Peak chart positions	
Title	Album details	UK	SCO
Brave	Released: 1 September 2017; Label: Decca; Formats: CD, digital download	73	51
