= Jules O'Dwyer & Matisse =

British dog dancing act

- Years active: 2015–present
- Occupation: Dog trick act
- Members: Jules O'Dwyer; Matisse; Chase; Skippy

Jules O'Dwyer & Matisse are a British canine freestyle act, comprising trainer Jules O'Dwyer and her dog Matisse, a male Border Collie. Together they won the ninth series of Britain's Got Talent in 2015.

== Career ==
=== Britain's Got Talent ===
Jules O'Dwyer & Matisse participated in the ninth series of Britain's Got Talent. For their audition in episode 7, O'Dwyer took the role of a dog catcher with Matisse portraying a stray dog. In addition to telling a story, Matisse performed a variety of canine freestyle tricks. The routine earned them four yes votes from the judges. On 23 May 2015 it was announced that they were one of the semi-finalists. They performed during the second semi-finals on 26 May. This time O'Dwyer acted as toy maker with Matisse being a toy. The act included another of O'Dwyer's dogs, Chase, who looks like Matisse. They received 29.3% of the viewers' votes, earning them first place in the semi-final and a place in the final.

Their performance in the final, on 31 May, consisted of O'Dwyer being a policewoman and Matisse a sausage thief. O'Dwyer included two of her other dogs, Chase and Skippy, in the act. Matisse performed numerous tricks, but the biggest trick was a dog scaling a tightrope. At the end of the night, it was revealed that Jules O'Dwyer & Matisse were the winners, receiving 22.6% of the votes. The runner-up, Jamie Raven, lost by 2.2%. The following day, O'Dwyer stated in an interview that Chase did the tightrope trick. The viewers were unaware of this because Matisse and Chase look very similar. Some viewers felt that they were tricked or misled since they didn't know that Chase was in the act and assumed that one dog did all the tricks. Ofcom received upwards of 200 complaints over the incident in their final performance. Although no formal action was taken, Simon Cowell said that they would not be stripped of their £250,000 prize money. On 17 August 2015 Ofcom ruled that Britain's Got Talent had misled the public, acknowledging that ITV did not intend to deceive viewers - it said they were ultimately misled - having received in excess of 1000 complaints, to that date. Ofcom said ITV broke rule 2.14 of the broadcasting code which states that "broadcasters must ensure that viewers... are not materially misled about any broadcast competition or voting".

== Personal life ==
As of 2015 they lived in Tongeren, Belgium.

== See also ==
- Ashleigh and Pudsey

Preceded by Collabro	Winner of Britain's Got Talent; 2015	Succeeded by Richard Jones
