= Richard Jones (magician) =

British magician and soldier (born 1990)

- Born: 21 September 1990 (age 35); Leytonstone, London, England
- Education: West Hatch High School, Chigwell, Essex, England
- Occupations: Soldier, magician
- Years active: 2016–present
- Height: 5 ft 8 in (1.73 m)

Lance Corporal Richard Jones (born 21 September 1990) is a British magician and former soldier, best known for winning the tenth series of Britain's Got Talent in 2016.

== Biography ==
Richard Jones was born in Leytonstone, London and grew up in Chigwell, Essex. He joined the British Army in 2010 and studied for one year in Twickenham at the Royal Military School of Music.

He spent three years with the band of the Parachute Regiment before being posted to the band of the Household Cavalry in 2014 as a mounted dutyman.

On 15 March 2016, he appeared as a contestant on ITV's The Chase.

On 11 June 2016, Lance Corporal Jones performed as a bandsman in the Trooping the Colour, as part of the 90th birthday celebrations of Her Majesty Queen Elizabeth II. He performed as a magician in the Royal Variety Performance at the Hammersmith Apollo in early December, in the presence of senior members of the British royal family. In 2017, he had his own Saturday night prime time TV series on ITV called Operation Magic.

Richard Jones has toured the UK with his Power of Imagination tour which began in Windsor in August 2017 and ended on the Isle of Wight in November 2017. And since toured with shows: 'Escape - breaking the limits' tour 2018, 'An evening of Magic' tour 2020, 'The Soldier of illusion tour' 2022-2024, 'The Sound of Magic' tour 2025-2026.

Jones competed in Britain's Got Talent: The Champions in 2019. He managed to reach the top 3, and since featured on Britain's Got Talent: the Ultimate Magician, and numerous series since as well as regularly appearing on TV shows in the UK and around the world.

Preceded by Jules O'Dwyer & Matisse	Winner of Britain's Got Talent; 2016	Succeeded by Tokio Myers
