= Our Generation (album) =

Studio album by Tokio Myers
- Released: 17 November 2017
- Recorded: 2017
- Length: 48:13
- Label: Syco
- Producer: Tokio Myers; Craigie Dodds; Guy Farley

Singles from Our generation
- 1. "Bloodstream" Released: 12 October 2017; 2. "Baltimore" Released: 27 October 2017; 3. "Angel" Released: 3 November 2017

Our Generation is the debut studio album by British classical musician Tokio Myers. It was released on 17 November 2017 through Syco Music and features contributions from Ed Sheeran, J'Danna, Latir, Meave, Vera Hall, Guy Farley, Craigie Dodds, Hugh Fothergill and Alex Hepburn.

== Track listing ==
Note: All tracks are produced by Tokio Myers, Craigie Dodds and Guy Farley

Our Generation
No.	Title	Writer(s)	Length
1.	"Red"	Torville Jones; Craigie Dodds; Guy Farley	1:41
2.	"Baltimore"	Jones; Dodds; J'Danah Marshall; Farley; Pete Boxta Martin	3:42
3.	"Bloodstream"	Edward Christopher Sheeran; Johnny McDaid; Gary Lightbody; Kesi Dryden; Piers Aggett; Amir Izadkhah; Achille-Claude Debussy	3:35
4.	"Angel"	Abel Tesfaye; Benjamin Diehl; Stephan Moccio; Danny Schofield	3:26
5.	"Limitless"	Jones; Dodds; Farley	3:54
6.	"Mercy"	Jones; Adell Hall Ward; Dodds; Farley	4:06
7.	"To Be Loved"	Jones; Latir Thakur; Dodds; Farley	3:18
8.	"Children (Interlude)"	Jones; Dodds; Farley	1:16
9.	"Children"	Roberto Concina	3:33
10.	"Polaroid"	Jones; Dodds; Farley	3:55
11.	"Our Generation"	Jones; Dodds; Farley	5:18
12.	"Lotus Flower"	Jones; Dodds; Farley	4:05
13.	"Pursuit of Happiness"	Jones; Anna Hepburn; Dodds; Farley	6:24
Total length:			48:13

Notes

- Track 2 features uncredited vocals from J'Danna.
- Track 3 features uncredited backing vocals from Ed Sheeran.
- Track 3 covers the songs "Bloodstream" by Ed Sheeran and "Clair de Lune" by Claude Debussy.
- Track 4 featured uncredited vocals from Latir and Meave.
- Track 4 covers the song "Angel" by The Weeknd, featuring Maty Noyes.
- Track 6 samples uncredited vocals from Vera Hall.
- Track 6 samples the song "Death, Have Mercy" by Vera Hall.
- Track 7 features uncredited vocals from Latir.
- Track 9 features uncredited vocals from Meave.
- Track 9 covers the song "Children" by Robert Miles.
- Track 12 features uncredited backing vocals from Tokio Myers, Craigie Dodds, Guy Farley and Hugh Fothergill.
- Track 13 features uncredited vocals from Alex Hepburn.

== Charts ==
=== Weekly charts ===
Chart (2017–18)	Peak position
Irish Albums (IRMA)	23
New Zealand Heatseeker Albums (RMNZ)	2
Scottish Albums (OCC)	9
UK Albums (OCC)	4

=== Year-end charts ===
Chart (2017)	Position
UK Albums (OCC)	88

== Certifications ==
Region	Certification	Certified units/sales
United Kingdom (BPI)	Gold	100,000^{‡}
^{‡} Sales+streaming figures based on certification alone.
