= Britain's Got Talent series 9 =

Britain's Got Talent
- Series 9
- Presented by: Ant & Dec (ITV); Stephen Mulhern (ITV2)
- Judges: David Walliams; Alesha Dixon; Amanda Holden; Simon Cowell
- Winner: Jules O'Dwyer & Matisse
- Runner-up: Jamie Raven

Release
- Original network: ITV; ITV2 (BGMT)
- Original release: 11 April – 31 May 2015

Series chronology
- ← Previous; Series 8 Next → Series 10

Judges and Presenter(s) for Britain's Got Talent Series 9

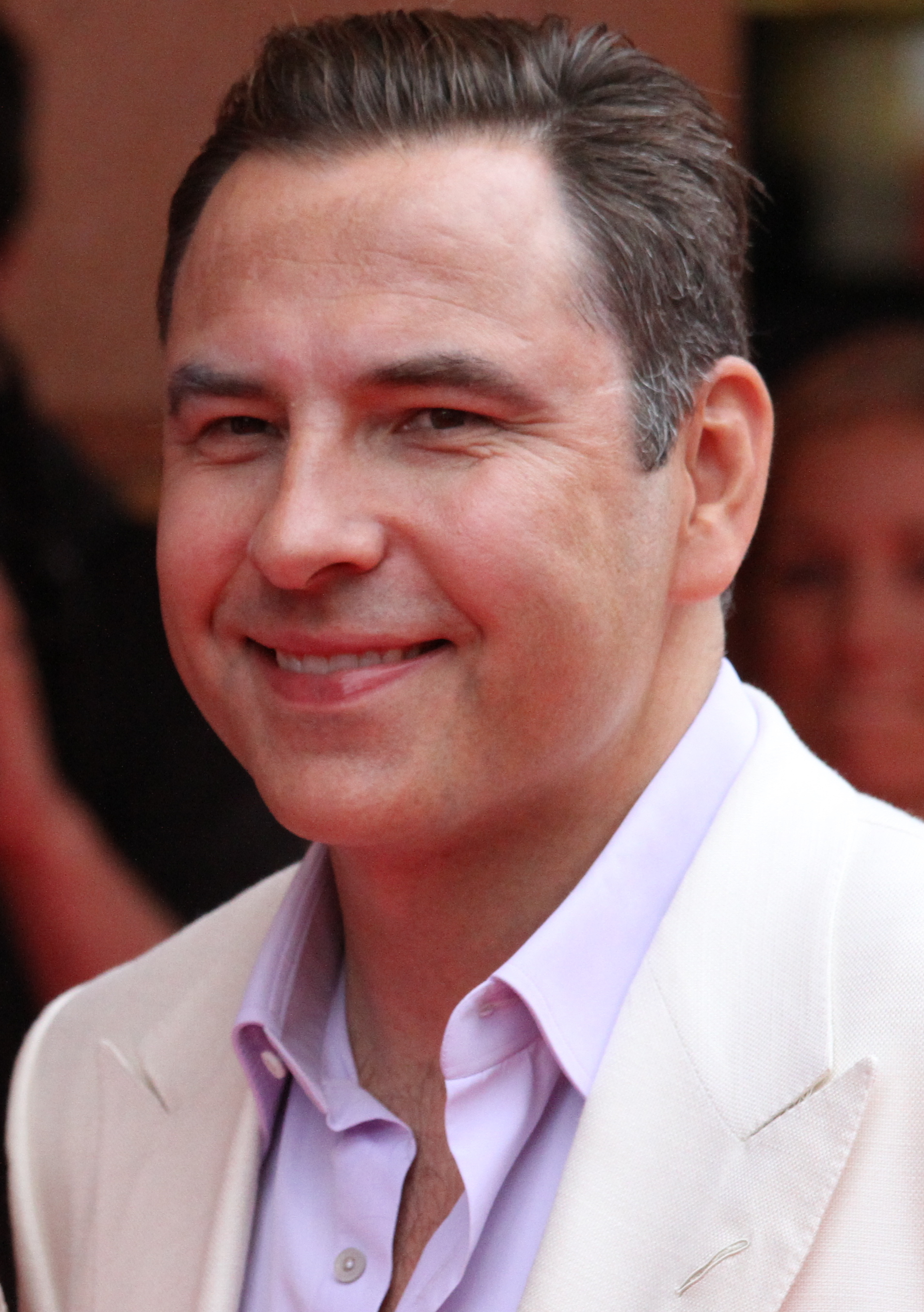
David Walliams

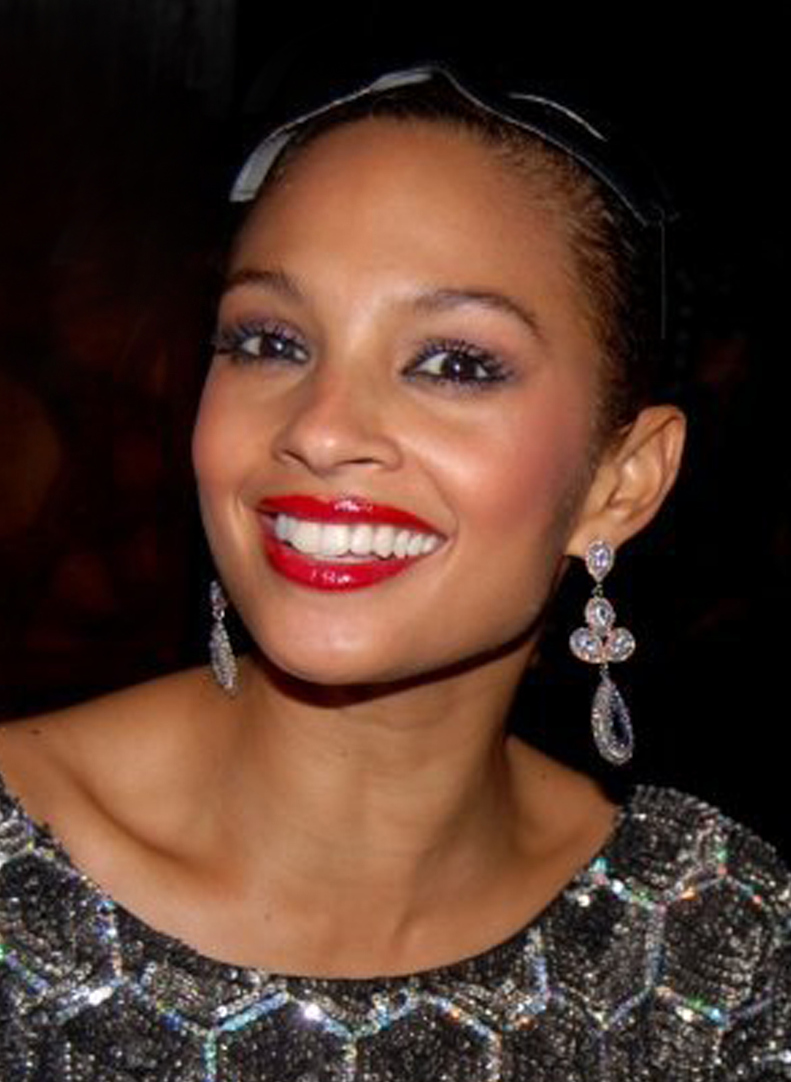
Alesha Dixon

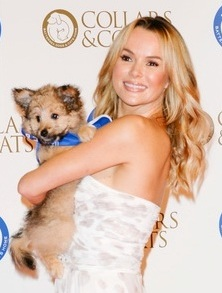
Amanda Holden

Simon Cowell

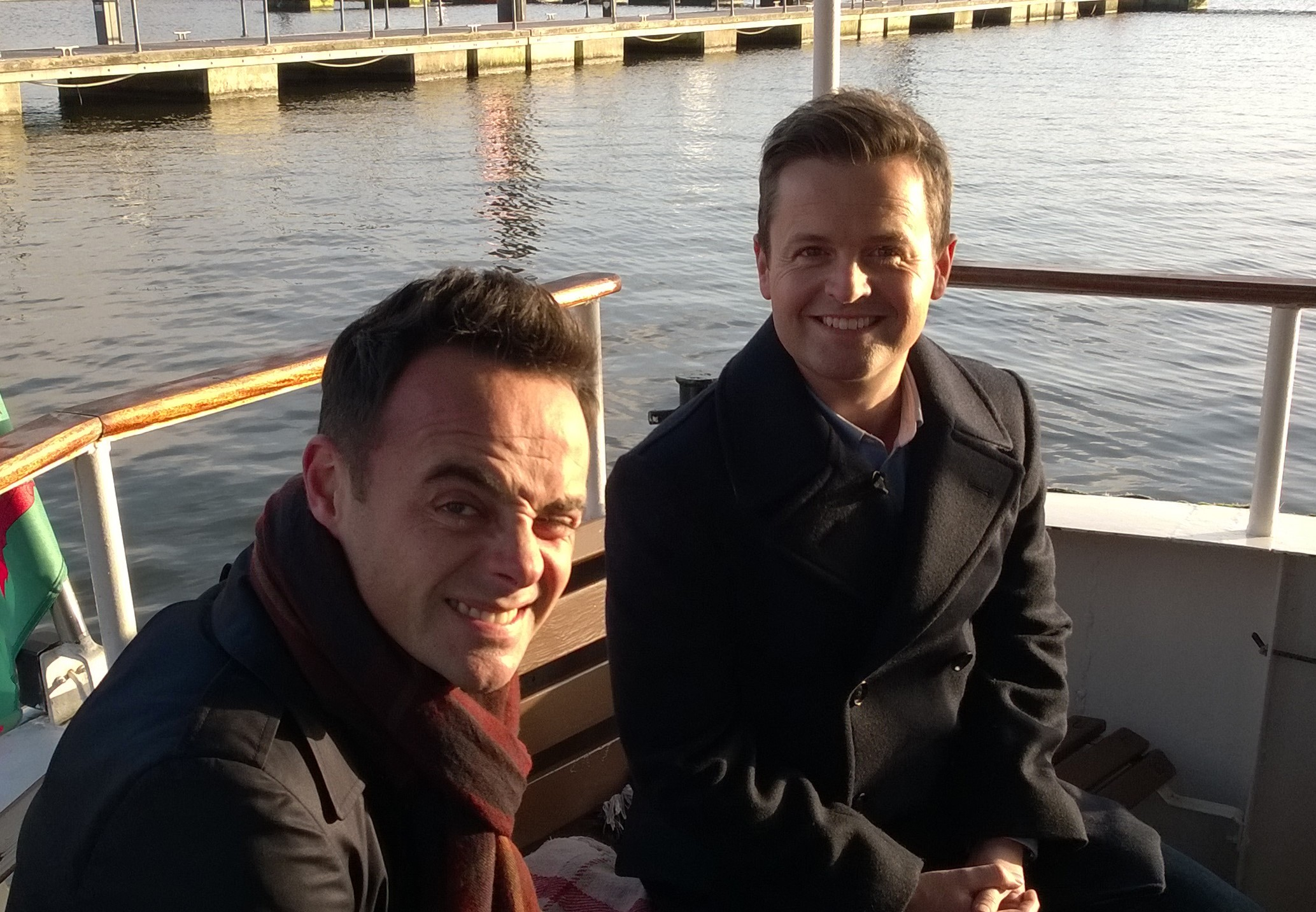
Ant & Dec (ITV1)

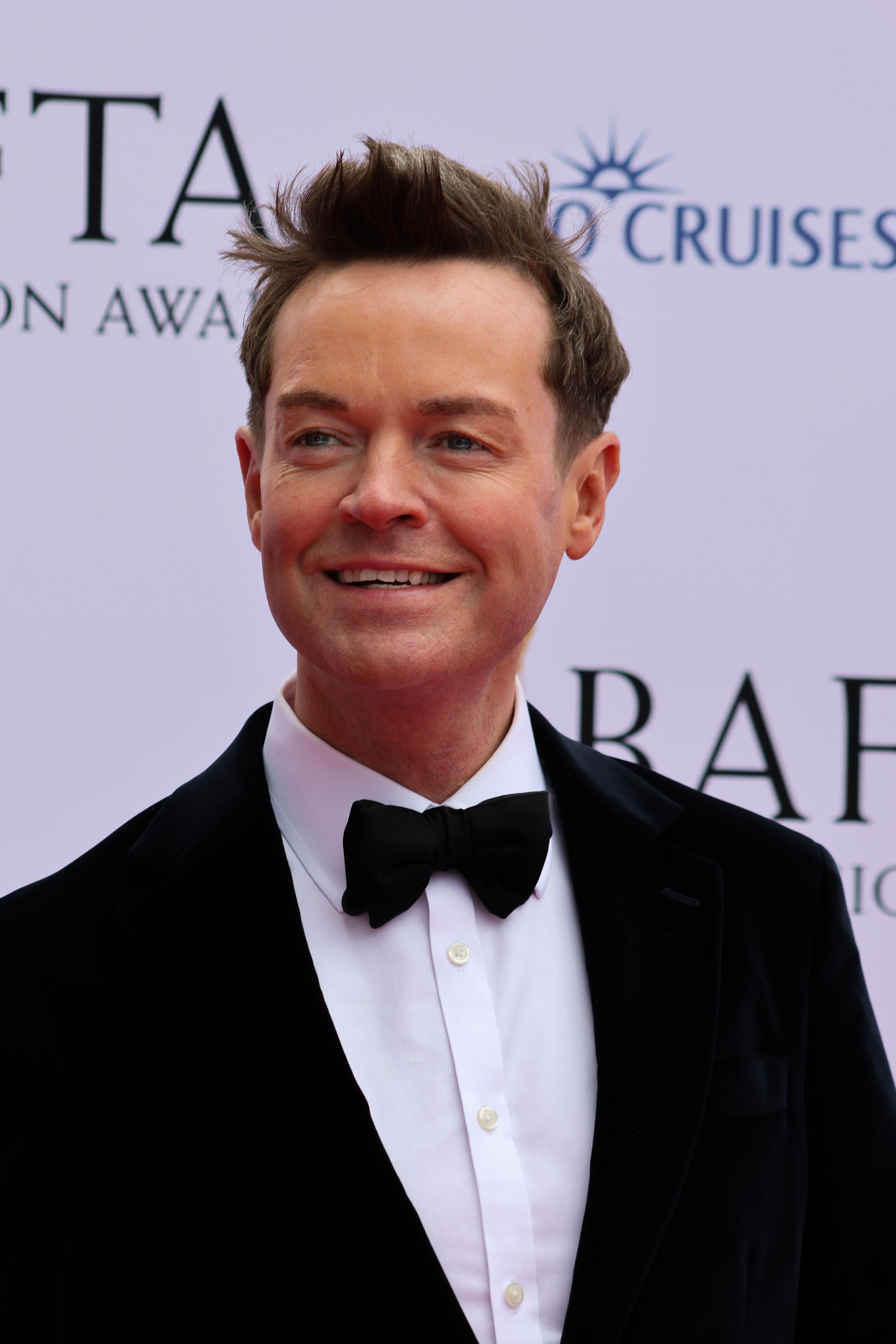
Stephen Mulhern (ITV2)

The ninth series of the British talent competition programme Britain's Got Talent was broadcast on ITV, from 11 April to 31 May 2015. The series saw the "Wildcard" format introduced in the sixth series being modified in this series to include a "Public Wildcard" – like the "Judges' Wildcard" any act eliminated in the semi-finals, primarily those that lost out in the Judges' vote, could be reinstated by the public, based on the one that received the most votes from them before the final. Although speculations and rumours began to emerge after the previous series ended, claiming that some of the judges would be leaving before the ninth series, these were later dismissed as being unfounded by ITV, on 16 January 2015.

The ninth series was won by dog tricks duo Jules O'Dwyer & Matisse, with magician Jamie Raven finishing in second place and Welsh choir Côr Glanaethwy third. During its broadcast, the series averaged around 9.9 million viewers. The ninth series saw the programme have to answer allegations of animal cruelty against a ventriloquist, while the producers caused controversy over the handling of O'Dwyer's performance in the final that Ofcom later ruled to have been misleading following complaints by viewers.

== Series overview ==
Following open auditions held the previous year between October and December, the Judges' auditions took place between January and February 2015, within Edinburgh, Manchester, Birmingham and London., Unlike previous years, where a guest judge had to stand-in for another, no issues occurred that caused a member of the judging panel to be absent. The auditions were held in a more standard manner for this year, though with the "Golden Buzzer" format remaining part of them since its introduction to the show in the previous series.

Of the participants that took part, forty-five made it past this stage and into the five live semi-finals – of these acts, dance troupe Boyband, singer Calum Scott, choir Revelation Avenue, dance act Entity Allstars, and comedy singer Lorraine Bowen, each received a golden buzzer during their auditions – with nine appearing in each one. In a minor change to the show's "Wildcard act" format, the series saw the introduction of the "Public Wildcard". Like the "Judges' wildcard", if a semi-finalist was eliminated in their semi-final at the Judges' vote, they became eligible to be picked as a wildcard act by the public, who would vote on which one they would like to reinstate into the final once all the semi-finals had been aired, with their choice being the one to have received the most votes by the time the final was due to be aired. While the Public Wildcard was extreme martial artist Jesse-Jane McParland, who lost out in the tied Judges' vote in the final semi-final, the Judges' Wildcard for this series was dance troupe Boyband, who lost the Judges' vote in the fourth semi-final. As a result, it led to a total of twelve acts taking part in the series' final.

The below lists the results of each participant's overall performance in this series:

Winner | Runner-up | Finalist | Semi-finalist
Judges' Wildcard Finalist | Public Wildcard Finalist | Golden Buzzer Audition

Participant	Age(s) ^{1}	Genre	Performance Type	Semi-final	Result
Alison Jiear	50	Singing	Singer	2	Eliminated
Andrew Fleming	51	Comedy	Impressionist	1	Eliminated
Beat Brothers	19–23	Dance	Tap Dance Group	5	Eliminated
Becky O'Brien	34	Singing	Singer	1	Eliminated
Billy & Emily England	28 & 25	Danger	Rollerskating Duo	1	Eliminated
Bonetics	17	Acrobatics / Dance	Contortionist Dancer	2	Eliminated
Boyband	17–19	Dance	Dance Group	4	Finalist
Calum Scott	26	Singing	Singer	5	Finalist
Chloe Louise Crawford	27	Magic	Illusionist	5	Eliminated
Côr Glanaethwy	7–65	Singing	Choir	1	Third Place
Danny Posthill	28	Comedy	Impressionist	5	Finalist
Dylan Byrd	17	Dance	Hip Hop Dancer	3	Eliminated
Ella Shaw	18	Singing	Singer	3	Eliminated
Emma Jones	23	Singing	Opera Singer	5	Eliminated
Entity Allstars	10–15	Dance	Street Dance Group	1	Finalist
Gracie Wickens-Sweet	11	Singing	Singer	3	Eliminated
Groove Thing	7–11	Dance	80’s Dance Group	2	Eliminated
Henry Gallagher	12	Singing / Music	Singer & Guitarist	1	Eliminated
IMD Legion	9–17	Dance	Street Dance Group	3	Eliminated
Isaac Waddington	15	Singing / Music	Singer & Pianist	4	Finalist
Jamie Raven	31	Magic	Magician	3	Runner-Up
Jeffrey Drayton	73	Magic	Entertainer	4	Eliminated
Jesse-Jane McParland	9	Acrobatics	Martial Artist	5	Finalist
Jonathan Lutwyche	15	Dance	Contemporary Dancer	5	Eliminated
Jules O'Dwyer & Matisse	49 & 7 ^{2}	Animals	Dog Act	2	Winner
Lisa Sampson	35	Variety	Hula Hoop Artist	4	Eliminated
Lorraine Bowen	53	Singing / Music	Singer & Keyboardist	1	Eliminated
Luca Calò	23	Singing / Dance	Singer & Dancer	2	Eliminated
Maia Gough	13	Singing	Singer	4	Eliminated
Marc Métral	61 ^{2}	Comedy / Animals	Ventriloquist & Dog Act	4	Eliminated
Michael Late	44	Magic	Illusionist	2	Eliminated
Misstasia	22–24	Singing	Girl Group	5	Eliminated
Mitch & Cally the Wonderdog	42 & 10 ^{3}	Animals	Record Breaking Dog Act	1	Eliminated
Narinder Dhani	43	Music	Comb Musician	3	Eliminated
OK Worldwide	19–28	Acrobatics	Acrobatic Group	4	Eliminated
Old Men Grooving	40–60	Dance	Dance Group	2	Finalist
Peter Lambert	32	Variety	Circus Performer	5	Eliminated
Revelation Avenue	20–30	Singing	Gospel Choir	2	Eliminated
Ruby Red Performers	25–64	Dance	Burlesque Dance Group	1	Eliminated
The Honeybuns	22–33	Singing	Girl Group	2	Eliminated
The Kanneh-Masons	9–18	Music	Classical Musicians	4	Eliminated
The Kingdom Tenors	21–31	Singing	Vocal Harmony Group	3	Eliminated
The Neales	24–59	Singing	Vocal Group	4	Finalist
The Sakyi Five	10–20	Singing	Boy Band	3	Eliminated
UDI	19-32	Dance	Electronic Dance Group	3	Finalist

- ^1 Ages denoted for a participant(s), pertain to their final performance for this series.
- ^2 The age of the dogs used by Jules O'Dwyer, other than Matisse, and that of the dog used by Marc Metral, were not disclosed during their time on the programme.
- ^3 The latter value denotes the age of the dog, as disclosed by its owner.

=== Semi-finals summary ===
Buzzed out | Judges' vote | Won the public vote
Won the judges' vote | Lost the judges' vote | Eliminated

==== Semi-final 1 (25 May) ====
- Guest performance: Ricky Martin ("Mr. Put It Down")

Semi-Finalist	Order	Performance Type	Buzzes and Judges' Vote				Percentage	Finished
Semi-Finalist	Order	Performance Type	Cowell	Holden	Dixon	Walliams	Percentage	Finished
Entity Allstars	1	Street Dance Group					12.8%	3rd (Won Judges' vote)
Billy & Emily England	2	Rollerskating Duo					7.6%	7th – Eliminated
Mitch & Cally the Wonderdog	3	World Record Dog Act					11.5%	5th – Eliminated
Henry Gallagher	4	Singer & Guitarist					17.5%	2nd (Lost Judges' vote)
Côr Glanaethwy	5	Choir					21.9%	1st (Won Public vote)
Ruby Red Performers	6	Burlesque Dance Group					2.5%	9th – Eliminated
Andrew Fleming	7	Impressionist					2.5%	8th – Eliminated
Becky O'Brien	8	Singer					11.4%	6th – Eliminated
Lorraine Bowen	9	Singer & Keyboardist					12.3%	4th – Eliminated

==== Semi-final 2 (26 May) ====
- Guest performance: Jack Pack ("Light My Fire")

Semi-Finalist	Order	Performance Type	Buzzes and Judges' Vote				Percentage	Finished
Semi-Finalist	Order	Performance Type	Cowell	Holden	Dixon	Walliams	Percentage	Finished
Groove Thing	1	80’s Dance Troupe					7.2%	4th – Eliminated
Jules O'Dwyer & Matisse	2	Dog Act					29.3%	1st (Won Public vote)
Bonetics	3	Contortionist Dancer					6.2%	5th – Eliminated
Revelation Avenue	4	Gospel Choir					16.3%	3rd (Judges' vote tied – Lost on Public vote)
The HoneyBuns	5	Girl Group					5.3%	6th – Eliminated
Michael Late	6	Illusionist					4.5%	7th – Eliminated
Luca Calò	7	Singer & Dancer					1.4%	9th – Eliminated
Alison Jiear	8	Singer					2.7%	8th – Eliminated
Old Men Grooving	9	Dance Group					27.1%	2nd (Judges' vote tied – Won on Public vote)

==== Semi-final 3 (27 May) ====
- Guest performance: Alesha Dixon ("The Way We Are")

Semi-Finalist	Order	Performance Type	Buzzes and Judges' Vote				Percentage	Finished
Semi-Finalist	Order	Performance Type	Cowell	Holden	Dixon	Walliams	Percentage	Finished
The Sakyi Five	1	Boy Band					8.0%	6th – Eliminated
UDI	2	Electronic Dance Group					12.4%	2nd (Judges' vote tied – Won on Public vote)
Dylan Byrd	3	Hip Hop Dancer					3.8%	8th – Eliminated
Ella Shaw	4	Singer					7.4%	7th – Eliminated
Gracie Wickens-Sweet	5	Singer					10.0%	5th – Eliminated
IMD Legion	6	Street Dance Group					11.6%	3rd (Judges' vote tied – Lost on Public vote)
Narinder Dhani	7	Comb Musician					2.3%	9th – Eliminated
The Kingdom Tenors	8	Vocal Harmony Group					10.8%	4th – Eliminated
Jamie Raven	9	Close Up Magician					33.7%	1st (Won Public vote)

==== Semi-final 4 (28 May) ====
- Guest performance: Olly Murs ("Beautiful To Me")

Semi-Finalist	Order	Performance Type	Buzzes and Judges' Vote				Percentage	Finished
Semi-Finalist	Order	Performance Type	Cowell	Holden	Dixon	Walliams	Percentage	Finished
Ok Worldwide	1	Acrobatic Group					1.3%	9th – Eliminated
Lisa Sampson	2	Hula Hoop Artist					5.1%	7th – Eliminated
The Kanneh-Masons	3	Classical Musicians					12.1%	5th – Eliminated
The Neales	4	Vocal Group					17.6%	2nd (Won Judges' vote)
Maia Gough	5	Singer					8.0%	6th – Eliminated
Jeffrey Drayton	6	Entertainer					3.1%	8th – Eliminated
Marc Métral	7	Ventriloquist & Dog Act					16.6%	4th – Eliminated
Isaac Waddington	8	Singer & Pianist					18.6%	1st (Won Public vote)
Boyband ^{4}	9	Dance Group					17.6%	3rd (Lost Judges' vote)

- ^4 Boyband were later sent through to the final as the judges' wildcard.

==== Semi-final 5 (29 May) ====
- Guest performance: Collabro ("I Won't Give Up")

Semi-Finalist	Order	Performance Type	Buzzes and Judges' Vote				Percentage	Finished
Semi-Finalist	Order	Performance Type	Cowell	Holden	Dixon	Walliams	Percentage	Finished
Beat Brothers	1	Tap Dance Group					6.5%	6th – Eliminated
Chloe Louise Crawford	2	Magician					2.5%	8th – Eliminated
Peter Lambert	3	Circus Performer					1.1%	9th – Eliminated
Misstasia	4	Girl Group					4.3%	7th – Eliminated
Jonathan Lutwyche	5	Contemporary Dancer					13.9%	4th – Eliminated
Emma Jones	6	Opera Singer					11.5%	5th – Eliminated
Danny Posthill	7	Impressionist					20.3%	2nd (Judges' vote tied – Won on Public vote)
Jesse-Jane McParland ^{5}	8	Martial Artist					14.3%	3rd (Judges' vote tied – Lost on Public vote)
Calum Scott	9	Singer					25.6%	1st (Won Public vote)

- ^5 Jesse-Jane McParland was later sent through to the final as the public's wildcard.

=== Public Wildcard ===
Semi-Finalist	Semi-Final	Performance Type	Percentage	Finished
Henry Gallagher	1	Singer & Guitarist	19.2%	2nd
Revelation Avenue	2	Gospel Choir	19.0%	3rd
IMD Legion	3	Street Dance Group	9.7%	5th
Boyband	4	Dance Group	18.8%	4th
Jesse Jane McParland	5	Martial Artist	33.3%	1st

=== Final (31 May) ===
- Guest performances: Andrea Bocelli ("The Prayer") & The Cast Of Michael Flatley's Lord of the Dance

Winner | Runner-up

Finalist	Order	Performance Type	Percentage	Finished
Entity Allstars	1	Street Dance Group	1.7%	11th
UDI	2	Electronic Dance Group	1.9%	10th
The Neales	3	Vocal Group	3.6%	9th
Boyband	4	Dance Group	1.5%	12th
Jesse-Jane McParland	5	Martial Artist	4.2%	8th
Danny Posthill	6	Impressionist	5.3%	7th
Calum Scott	7	Singer	8.2%	6th
Côr Glanaethwy	8	Choir	10.7%	3rd
Old Men Grooving	9	Dance Group	10.2%	4th
Jamie Raven	10	Close Up Magician	20.4%	2nd
Isaac Waddington	11	Singer & Pianist	9.7%	5th
Jules O'Dwyer & Matisse	12	Dog Act	22.6%	1st

== Ratings ==
Episode	Date	Total viewers (millions)	Weekly rank	Share (%)
Auditions 1	11 April	11.25	1	43.2
Auditions 2	18 April	11.47	1	44.1
Auditions 3	25 April	11.87	1	46.3
Auditions 4	2 May	11.73	1	45.0
Auditions 5	9 May	11.64	1	45.1
Auditions 6	16 May	11.55	1	47.0
Auditions 7	23 May	9.35	1	35.2
Semi-final 1	25 May	10.18	3	37.8
Semi-final 1 results	25 May	7.74	15	28.7
Semi-final 2	26 May	9.34	10	36.8
Semi-final 2 results	26 May	7.60	16	31.1
Semi-final 3	27 May	9.48	6	38.8
Semi-final 3 results	27 May	8.09	13	31.7
Semi-final 4	28 May	9.26	11	37.2
Semi-final 4 results	28 May	7.87	12	34.5
Semi-final 5	29 May	9.51	8	39.2
Semi-final 5 results	29 May	7.91	14	32.1
Live final	31 May	12.75	1	46.6

== Criticism & controversies ==
=== Marc Métral ventriloquism act ===
In April 2015, following the audition of Marc Métral, several animal rights groups raised complaints that his performance, involving the use of a dog, purported to portraying a form of animal cruelty on television. The routine he used involved his dog wearing a specially designed "ventriloquist mask" – a special device used by ventriloquists on human volunteers, in order to make them into special dummy character for their routines - and was conducted in a similar manner to that of a participant on the seventh series of America's Got Talent in 2012. Métral refuted the claims by stating that he cared deeply for the well-being of his dog, while Simon Cowell refuted the claims a month later, owing to his involvement in dog charities, defending the broadcast of the footage on Twitter by explaining that the audition was allowed to be shown because both himself and the production staff had involved the RSPCA to oversee the welfare of Métral's dog before, during, and after his performance.

=== Misleading dog act ===
The ninth series became notable for the controversy surrounding the performance of Jules O'Dwyer, and in particular the routine of her dog tricks act in the final. The nature of the complaint focused on the fact that while O'Dwyer had been clear that her occupation involved training and use multiple dogs for her routines, she hadn't disclosed the fact that she had to use two dogs with similar appearances for the final, as her main dog Matisse was unable to perform a trick involving a tightrope section. When this came to light in an interview the morning after the final on 1 June 2015, Ofcom were forced to launch an investigation after 1,000 complaints were raised by viewers who felt misled by the performance's broadcast.

Although no formal action was taken by the programme against O'Dwyer and producers, after Cowell launched his own investigation into the incident, an apology had to be issued for the confusion caused by the failure not to disclose this detail as clearly as possible. However, on 17 August, Ofcom found in their investigation that while there had been no intention to deceive viewers, both the production staff and ITV were responsible for allowing Britain's Got Talent to mislead people, and ruled that they had breached broadcasting codes that require television and radio programmes to not be misleading and present facts as accurately as possible.
