= Old Men Grooving =

British dance group

- Origin: United Kingdom
- Years active: 2014–present
- Members: Patrick Alan; Fred Folkes; Phil Stanley; Bret Jones; Richard Banks
- Past members: David Welch
- Website: Old Men Grooving's Website; Old Men Grooving on Twitter

Old Men Grooving, sometimes known as OMG, is a British dance group, best known for becoming a television sensation when they took part in the ninth series of Britain's Got Talent in 2015. The group, composed of five middle-aged men, represents a diverse background and is dedicated to sharing a variety of popular dance and “feel good” grooves.

== Career ==
=== 2014: Formation and Sainsbury's advert ===
The group formed in 2014 when Sainsbury's was looking for dancers to take part in an online advertisement for the supermarket chain's Christmas jumpers. Conceived and produced by Gravity Road, the commercial went viral, prompting a record number of shares on social media. Steve Hatch, the UK and Ireland M.D. of Facebook, said, “We don't normally comment on specific campaigns, but this really is exceptional.” The advertisement boosted record sales for that year. Sainsbury's CEO, Mike Coupe, stated, “We sold more than twice the number of Christmas jumpers compared to last”.

=== 2015: Britain's Got Talent ===
Old Men Grooving was invited to audition in front of the judges for the ninth series of Britain's Got Talent in 2015. Their audition at the Dominion Theatre in London brought an unexpected and wildly enthusiastic reaction from both the audience and the judges. After their audition they received four yeses. Simon Cowell said "A lot of dance acts I get bored rigid by, but I could watch you guys all night", and David Walliams said "You've made dad dancing cool".

The original BGT audition video has garnered over 60 million views on YouTube, but is estimated to have over 200 million views worldwide on various channels.

OMG went through to the live shows, where they performed on the second night of the semi-finals (26 May). After the judges put the decision to deadlock, Old Men Grooving won the public vote and made it through to the final of Britain's Got Talent. The final took place on 31 May, where the group performed ninth. They came fourth in the public vote, just missing out on a spot in the top three. They received 10.2% of the vote, only 0.5% under 3rd place, Cor Glanaethwy, which received 10.7%.

=== 2015–present: After Britain's Got Talent ===
Since Britain's Got Talent, Old Men Grooving has performed around the world – in the UK, America, Mexico, and Germany - and is continually asked to make television appearances in the UK and Europe. In November 2015, they performed at the ITV Gala at the London Palladium. They performed on ITV's charity telethon Text Santa in December 2015. They performed at the Ideal Home Show in March 2016. In May 2016, they appeared in an episode of Up Late with Rylan. In 2016, they performed in the 10th Anniversary special at the Britain's Got Talent series 10 final with other popular acts from the past ten years. They performed with Little Mix for BBC Children In Need in 2016. In 2017 they appeared on the German television show It's Showtime. In 2018 they performed for the biggest show on Italian television, Amici. In 2018 OMG was asked back to perform with presenter Stephen Mulhern on Britain's Got More Talent.

Old Men Grooving continues to perform, delighting and surprising audiences in the UK and abroad.

Recent Television Appearances:

2018 Britain's Got More Talent

2018 Amici – Italian TV (Biggest Television Show in Italy)

2017 AO.com - BGT 2017 Ident

2017 It's Showtime - German TV - Sat 1

2016 BBC Children in Need – (with Little Mix)

2016 BGT 2016 Ident

2016 Britain's Got More Talent

2016 Britain's Got Talent (Ninth Anniversary Tribute with Diversity, George Sampson, Collabro, Stavros Flatley, etc.)

Live Appearances Include:

2018 Uswitch.com Britain's Got Talent Pre-show VIP Room

2017 Grand Order of Water Rats – (Entertainment Industry Charity Christmas Gala)

2017 AO.com Britain's Got Talent Pre-show VIP Room

2017 Breakin’ Convention – Sadler's Wells Theatre, London

2016 Ideal Home Show - London (32 performances)

2016 Walled City Tattoo (Derry, Northern Ireland)

2016 Santander UK (Corporate)

2016 Intu Gateshead (Retailer Awards 2016)

2015 ITV Gala at the London Palladium

2015 The Bellagio - Las Vegas (Corporate)

2015 British Tourist Board (Destination Britain) - Mexico

2015 British Grand Prix - Silverstone

2015 Jersey Live Festival – Jersey

2015 NFL UK Regent Street

2015 Rugby World Cup – Twickenham

2015 Children's Sports Award Lunch

2015 National Reality TV Awards

2015 Loughborough University – Student Union Fresher's Week

2015 Spiderman Ball (Celebrity Charity event for Testicular Cancer, celebrating Newcastle United FC player Jonas Gutierrez beating testicular cancer.)

2015 Christmas light switch-on in various parts of the country, from Carlisle and Oldham to Essex

== Filmography ==
Television

Year	Title	Role
2014	Good Morning Britain	Guest performers
2015, 2016	Britain's Got Talent	Contestants, guest performers
2015, 2016	Britain's Got More Talent	Guests
2015	This Morning	Guests
2015	ITV Text Santa	Guest performers
2016	Up Late with Rylan	Guests

Advertisements

Year	Title	Role
2014	Sainsbury's Christmas Jumper Online Advert	Themselves/performers
2015	Citroën's Perfect Day: Old Men Grooving with the Citroën C4 Picasso	Themselves/performers
