= Tite =

Tite may refer to:

== People ==
- Tite (football manager) (born 1961), Brazilian footballer, trainer and manager
- Tite (footballer, born 1930) (1930–2004), Brazilian footballer
- Tite Curet Alonso (1926–2003), Puerto Rican composer
- Tite Kubo (born 1977), Japanese manga artist
- Tite Margwelaschwili, (1891–1946), Georgian philosopher and writer
- Karen Tite, English actress
- William Tite (1798–1873), British architect and politician

== Places ==
- Tite (Guinea-Bissau), an area of Guinea-Bissau
- Saint-Tite, Quebec, a town in Canada
- Tite Street, a street in London, England

== See also ==
- Tite et Bérénice – Play written by Pierre Corneille
