= Green Balloon =

Green Balloon may refer to:

- Zielony Balonik (Green Balloon, in Polish), a literary cabaret in Kraków
- Green Balloon Club, a children's program on the BBC
