= Bessie Cursons =

- Born: Bessie Cursons; 8 June 1995 (age 30)
- Origin: Portsmouth, Hampshire, England
- Genres: Musical theatre
- Occupations: Singer, actress, performer
- Instrument: Vocals
- Years active: 2007–present
- Labels: Syco, Sony
- Website: Twitter

Bessie Cursons (born 8 June 1995) is an English singer, actress and dancer from Portsmouth, Hampshire. She reached the final of the first series of the ITV talent show Britain's Got Talent in 2007. Cursons starred in the children's comedy-drama, My Phone Genie.

== Early life ==
Cursons was born on 8 June 1995 in Portsmouth, Hampshire. She began singing and dancing at the age of 4 at local dance and music clubs. Her main ambition was to go on stage and become famous.

== Career ==
=== 2007: Britain's Got Talent ===
Cursons and her family were on holiday in Goa in India when the Britain's Got Talent auditions were being held, in May 2007, but, along with her father, she made the trip back to the UK to take part in them. In her audition, which was the last of the show and was televised on 13 June 2007, she performed "Wouldn't It Be Loverly" from the musical My Fair Lady and received a standing ovation from the audience, with Simon Cowell saying her audition was the most professional in the whole competition. She received three "yes" votes from the judges and was placed in the next round. She was chosen as one of the 24 semi-finalists for the semi-finals in June.

In the semi-final, on 15 June 2007, she performed "Supercalifragilisticexpialidocious" from the musical Mary Poppins and received a standing ovation and positive comments from the judges saying that she managed to improve on her audition. Cursons was automatically placed in the final after receiving the highest number of votes.

In the final, on 17 June 2007, she performed "Get Me to the Church on Time" from My Fair Lady. Judges Piers Morgan and Amanda Holden said Cursons 'deserves to be in the West End'. Simon Cowell, while he also liked it, said he preferred her semi-final performance. Cursons didn't win the final with opera singer Paul Potts winning it.

=== 2007–present: Post Talent ===
Cursons filmed alongside Alan Carr, Martin Freeman, Marc Wootton and Jake Pratt in the film Nativity!, in which two schools compete to put on the best nativity show. Cursons played posh pupil Christy in the film, and leads a rendition of Ding Dong Merrily on High in which she is flanked by two choirs on stage. The film was released on 27 November 2009. The film made almost £800,000 in its first week, and went in at number six in the UK film chart. Cursons had three auditions for the film and was overjoyed to get the part. She said 'I was so excited. I really didn't know what to expect'. We filmed for about two or three months at this really old, posh-looking school in Coventry – it was a lot of fun.'

Cursons performed at the Guide Awards in November 2007 and was among the star performers. Cursons performed her audition routine from Britain's Got Talent, Wouldn't It Be Loverly from My Fair Lady, at the showbiz ceremony at the Kings Theatre in Southsea. Cursons also does the voice of Victoria the dog in the popular children's cartoon series Gaspard and Lisa.

Portsmouth Today on 25 February 2009 reported that Cursons had landed a role in the West End production of Oliver!, alongside Rowan Atkinson at the Theatre Royal, Drury Lane. Cursons appeared in the show from the beginning of March until August.

Cursons starred as Jasmine Hart in the CITV comedy-drama series, My Phone Genie, which was filmed in 2011 and aired in 2012.

== Personal life ==
She attended Sylvia Young Theatre School. After Cursons' appearance on Britain's Got Talent, her mother swapped her job as a secretarial manager at St Mary's Hospital in Portsmouth for a similar role at St Thomas's Hospital in London so her daughter would not be alone on the commute to the capital to attend theatre school.

She is currently a teacher at Youngstar Television & Film Acting School in Hampshire. Bessie now has her own theatre and dance academy, sharing her knowledge to ensure local children have experience in dance, theatre, and acting. Her pupils have performed in the West End and have also appeared on various TV shows and films

In July 2021, she married her partner, Ashley Carter, and in December 2022, they welcomed a daughter.

== Filmography ==
=== Film ===
Year	Film	Role	Notes
2009	Nativity!	Christy	Film debut

=== Television ===
Year	Title	Role	Notes
2007	Britain's Got Talent	Herself	Finalist
2009	Gaspard and Lisa	Victoria, Donnie, Tad, Lila, Chad, Franny	Voice
2012	My Phone Genie	Jasmine Hart	
2013	By Any Means	Miss Cummings	
2016	Casualty	Dani Davis	Episode: "Hopelessly Addicted"

=== Stage ===
Year	Title	Role	Notes
2009	Oliver!	TBC	In role March–August 2009
