= Connie Talbot =

British singer (born 2000)

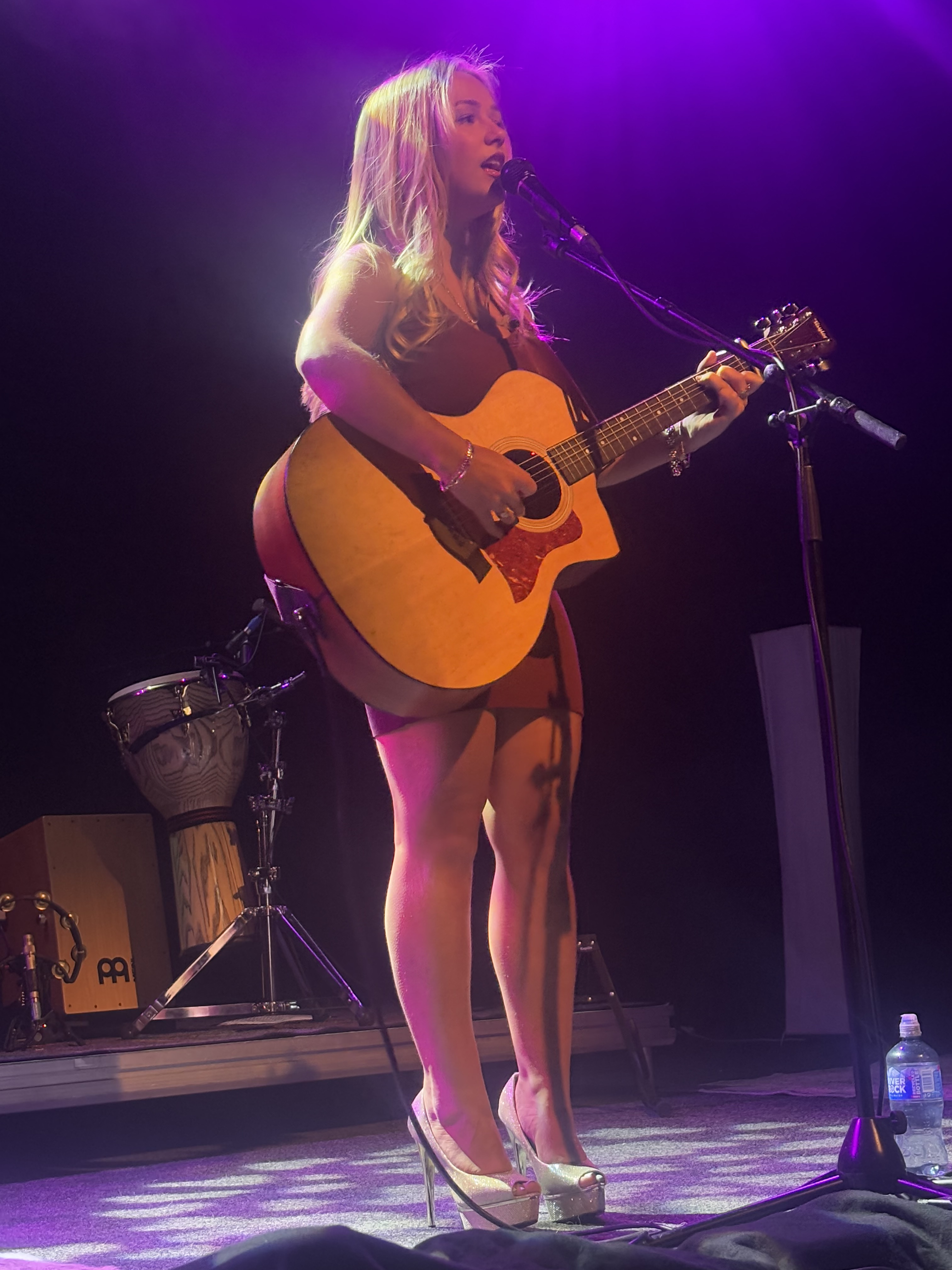
- Talbot performing in Dublin, 2025

Background information
- Born: Connie Victoria Elizabeth Talbot; 20 November 2000 (age 25); Birmingham, West Midlands, England
- Genres: Pop; ballad
- Occupations: Singer; songwriter
- Instruments: Vocals; guitar; piano
- Years active: 2007–present
- Label: Rainbow Records
- Website: www.connietalbot.com

Connie Victoria Elizabeth Talbot (born 20 November 2000) is a British singer who was the runner-up of the first series of Britain's Got Talent in 2007. She then signed with Rainbow Recording Company and released her debut album Over the Rainbow on 26 November 2007, which has sold over 250,000 copies worldwide and reached number one in three countries.

Talbot's second album, Connie Talbot's Christmas Album, was released on 24 November 2008, her third, Holiday Magic, was released on 20 October 2009 and her fourth, Beautiful World, was released on 26 November 2012. In 2019, she competed on Britain's Got Talent: The Champions and in 2020 competed on America's Got Talent: The Champions.

== History ==
=== Britain's Got Talent and Sony BMG ===
Talbot initially auditioned for the first series of television reality show Britain's Got Talent for fun, but her confidence increased when Simon Cowell, whom she is said to have idolised, described her as "pure magic" and said that he would make her earn "£1 million-plus this year". The judges had expected a "joke" performance as she had never taken singing lessons, but Talbot's initial performance received international press coverage. She reached the final round after winning her semi-final with a live performance of "Ben" by Michael Jackson. On the night of the final, she sang The Wizard of Oz's "Over the Rainbow", but lost to Paul Potts as a result of the call-in vote. Talbot and Potts had been joint favourites to win the series.

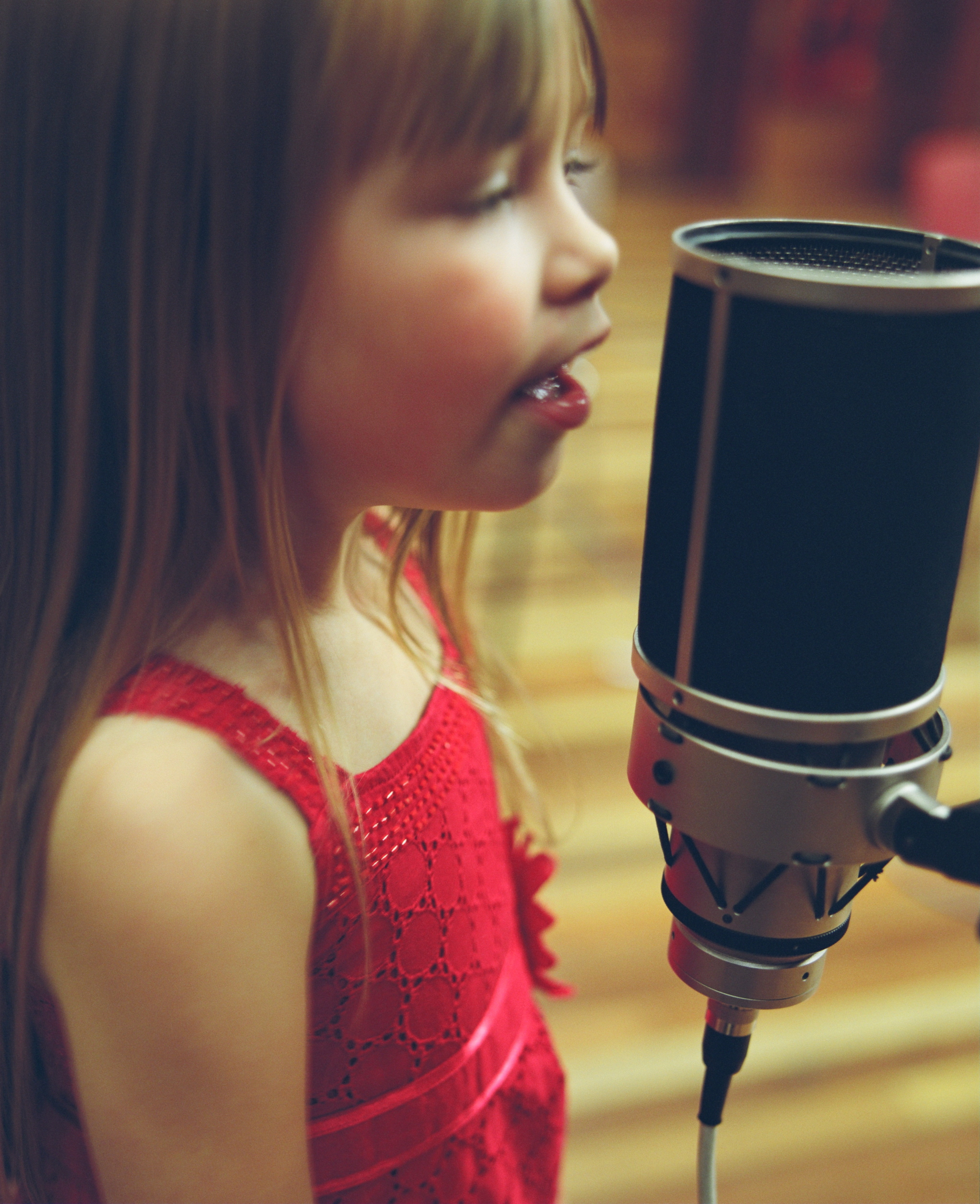
Talbot during the recording of "Smile" for Sony BMG

According to journalist and Britain's Got Talent judge Piers Morgan, Talbot's performances resulted in many children, including Faryl Smith, auditioning for the second series of the show. After his victory, series 2 winner George Sampson spoke of his participation in the first series, where he was knocked out before the live shows, saying "I don't think I had any shot of winning last year ... When you look at the standard of Paul Potts and Connie Talbot. Paul Potts is out of this league, and Connie is out of this league – I wasn't good enough." Talbot voted for Sampson, saying "I liked his dancing – he was good on the lamppost".

Cowell had preliminarily agreed to sign Talbot with his own record label, Sony BMG. After recording two songs in London with Talbot ("Over the Rainbow" and "Smile"), the label pulled out of the deal. Talbot's mother, Sharon, said she was told that her daughter "...was too young to be their sort of artist", adding "We have been told to look for a company which looks after children." In a statement, the label said "there was some deliberation over the possibility of recording with Connie ... However, the decision not to proceed was made with the best intentions for Connie, taking into consideration her age and that it would not be right to do so at this time." Cowell himself said that "when the time is right, [he would] be delighted to see if [they could] make it work".

=== Over the Rainbow ===
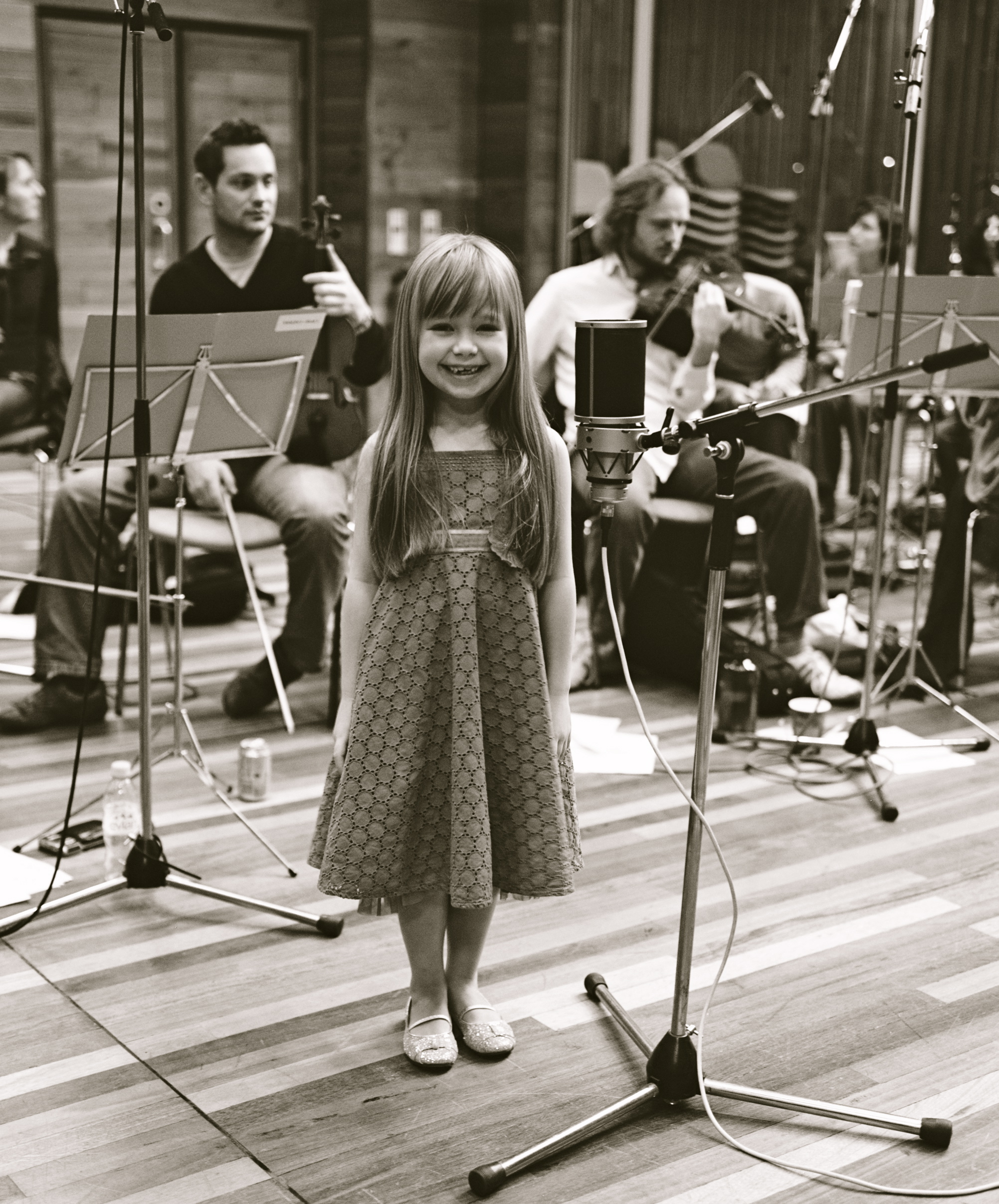
Talbot at the Olympic Studios during the recording of Over the Rainbow in 2007

In October 2007, Talbot signed with the Rainbow Recording Company for a six-figure deal. Rainbow Recording Company, an offshoot of record label Rhythm Riders made specifically for Talbot, was due to release Talbot's first album on 26 November 2007. It was later reported that the album was named Over the Rainbow, and the first single, "Over the Rainbow"/"White Christmas", would be released on 3 December 2007. Experts predicted that she had a good chance of getting the Christmas number one, but the single was cancelled in favour of an album-first release. Before the album was released, there was much speculation about Talbot and the album, with music experts describing her as potentially being "the next Charlotte Church". The team behind the album consisted of John Arnison, who also managed Gabrielle and Billy Ocean, and Marc Marot, former managing director of Island Records. It was produced and mixed by Simon Hill and Rob May.

The album was released on 26 November 2007 and was certified gold in early December, with Talbot being presented a gold disc by Phillip Schofield on This Morning. Initially, 50,000 copies of the album were pressed, but an additional 120,000 had to be made after the album sold out in days.

In late 2007, public appearances by Talbot included headlining the Great Bridge Christmas and Winter Festival, which local police threatened to cancel unless crowds clamouring to reach the tent in which Talbot was performing could be brought under control. At the event, on 7 December 2007, Talbot said "I love it here, it's brilliant, really fun", but had to be ushered off-stage by the police. Talbot performed publicly in Walsall's HMV store, and in Birmingham's Centenary Square. TV appearances included GMTV and Channel 5 news, both on 26 November 2007. According to her mother, Talbot has received offers for film roles. Sharon said "[Talbot]'s been sent a script, I haven't had a good look at it yet but it's really exciting ... Connie's a singer, not an actress, so we'll see what happens. It's completely up to her whether or not she wants to do it. I can't believe it, though."

Sharon Mawer of Allmusic praised Over the Rainbow by saying "She can sing, for a seven-year old, and most of the notes (if not all of them) are in the right order and sung to the right pitch; the timing is fine too". However, she criticised the album, saying "there's no feeling, no emotion, no realisation of what each song is about; they're just pretty little songs", giving the album 2/5. Nick Levine, of Digital Spy, said in a review of the album that Talbot had a "sweet, pure voice", but that there is "no nuance or depth to her performance". However, he said that "There's something inherently wrong about awarding a star rating to a seven-year-old", and that "the decidedly adult concept of musical merit should have nothing to do with [her music]", awarding the album 2/5.

The album was re-released on 16 June 2008, but was available for pre-order in May, with three new tracks to replace its Christmas-themed songs. The first single from the album, "Three Little Birds", was released in June 2008. In April and May 2008, Talbot toured Asia to promote Over the Rainbow. Asian press attributed her success to her videos on YouTube, with the Sun.Star mentioning that her most viewed video had been watched over 14 million times, and The Straits Times saying that videos of Talbot's performances have been watched over 30 million times. The tour made stops in South Korea, Taiwan, Hong Kong and Singapore, and Talbot and her family returned to England in late May. Following the tour, it was reported that the album had reached number one on the charts in Taiwan, South Korea and Hong Kong, as well as reaching number three in Singapore. After the tour, Talbot travelled to Poland, where she performed on television.

Over the Rainbow's release in the United States in September, resulted in attention from American press sources including Fox Business Network and MarketWatch. The US version was eventually released on 14 October, with Talbot appearing on American television shows including The Ellen DeGeneres Show to publicise the release.

In August 2008, it was announced that Talbot had signed a contract with Data Design Interactive for production of a video game on the Wii console. The game was to feature 15 songs from Over the Rainbow, allowing players to sing along with full-motion video footage of Talbot or against other players in a karaoke mode. Talbot re-recorded the album for the game. The game was scheduled for release in the first quarter of 2009, and was to be called Connie Talbot: Over the Rainbow, but was quietly cancelled due to licensing reasons over the songs to be used. A prototype build of the game surfaced in 2020 and was purchased by video game preservationist Forest of Illusion, who later uploaded a disk image of the game on the Internet Archive.

=== Christmas Album and Holiday Magic ===
In November 2008, it was announced that Talbot had produced a series of new songs for an album. Recorded in her bedroom studio, Connie Talbot's Christmas Album was released on 24 November. It is a Christmas themed album, featuring, according to Talbot's official website, "a mix of classics and modern Christmas tunes". News was also released of a one-off Christmas special to be shown on ITV1 in the days leading up to Christmas, featuring footage of Talbot's journey to America and a "secret concert" at her primary school. The documentary, Christmas with Connie, was shown on ITV Central on 18 December. Talbot appeared at Walsall's HMV branch shortly after the release of her Christmas Album to sign copies and meet fans. She then embarked on a promotional tour making stops around the world, which included a performance at Ewha Womans University in Korea, and a performance on the "A Heart for Children" television charity gala in Berlin, Germany. She returned home in mid December, to have "a quiet family Christmas".

Connie Talbot's Christmas Album was difficult to obtain in Britain after the distributor, Pinnacle Entertainment, went into administration. Talbot's mother, Sharon, was quoted as saying "We don't really know what's going to happen at the moment ... We think they'll probably wait and promote the album later this year. It's a shame, but they can still get the album in Asia and the US." Reviewing the album for FemaleFirst magazine, Ruth Harrison gave it 4/5, saying that Talbot has "a great voice when it comes to swing, but lets us down in parts".

In April 2009, Talbot again travelled to the US to publicise her new single, a cover of "I Will Always Love You". The single was released in the US on 7 April, along with a newly recorded "You Raise Me Up". Talbot then traveled to the US on 30 April, and returned on 2 May. Appearances included a performance on Good Day New York on Fox Broadcasting Company's WNYW.

Talbot's third album, Connie Talbot's Holiday Magic, was released on 20 October 2009 in the United States and on 30 November 2009 in the United Kingdom. The United States album is dedicated to the Toys for Tots campaign, of which Talbot has been named the child ambassador. In a statement, Bill Grein, vice-president of the Marine Toys for Tots Foundation, said:

The Marine Toys for Tots Foundation is extremely proud and excited to have Connie as our youngest ambassador ever ... She is the perfect person to inform the public of the millions of less fortunate children who may be overlooked this Christmas holiday season, unless people step up to donate a toy or make a cash contribution. Her angelic looks and voice will remind everyone of the innocence of children. And they all deserve to experience the magic of the holiday season! I hope she sells lots of CDs and raises a lot of money and awareness for our children.

Along with Talbot's third album, a television special, entitled Holiday Magic, was produced by WVIA. Holiday Magic featured performances of all of the songs from Connie Talbot's Holiday Magic, and was available to all PBS stations shown in November and December 2009. A 17-track DVD of the special, including two additional songs, "What a Wonderful World" and "Over the Rainbow", was released for sale.

=== 2010–2015 ===
Talbot opened a special concert celebrating South Korea's hosting of the G20 summit of world leaders in 2010. She performed for her largest ever audience when she performed on Chinese state television for the Chinese new-year in 2011. Viewing figures for the event were estimated to be around 400 million.

During this time, Talbot continued to upload videos of her performances onto YouTube.

Maggie Coughlan praised her covers of Katy Perry's "Firework" and Bruno Mars's "Grenade", but was most impressed by her cover of Adele's "Someone Like You", which she said was performed "with such grace that she makes the entire performance look effortless".

The video was also picked up by PerezHilton.com. After the death of Whitney Houston, Talbot posted a cover version of "Run to You" as a tribute. The video received attention from around the world. In November 2011, she released "Beautiful World" as a single on iTunes. The song was written by Talbot when she was seven. A demo of the track was placed on YouTube, and became the 39th most watched video in the world on the day it was uploaded.

She was the youngest artist to make the UK album charts, and the youngest to release a gold-selling record. Others involved in the event included Randolph Matthews and The High Kings. Performances took place elsewhere in the United Kingdom, including Manchester and Birmingham.

Talbot toured with the Young Voices choir for a second year in early 2013, performing at venues across the UK. The African Children's Choir also took part in these events. Her song "Let's Get Along", written by Kipper, was featured on ONE Campaign's agit8 Spotify album that July. Talbot also featured in the song "Building Bridges", which also made the agit8 album, together with Jordan Jansen.

In October 2013, Talbot's vocals featured in the theme song of the newly released video game Rain, and she appeared as a special guest at the African Children's Choir concert in Walsall, UK. It was announced that Talbot would be an ambassador for the African Children's Choir and have a school named after her.

In 2014, she performed two concerts in South Korea (Osan and Seoul) in late April, shortly after the Sewol ferry tragedy. She performed with yellow ribbons to show her respect for the families of the victims. The proceeds from at least one of the concerts were donated to the fundraising efforts in support of the families of the victims. In July, a DVD and Blu-ray was released of her concerts in Hong Kong and Taiwan during her Beautiful World tour in 2012. It features live performances of the songs from Beautiful World, and two additional songs, "I Will Always Love You" and "Over the Rainbow".

On 17 November 2014, Talbot released the five-song EP Gravity, containing the original songs "Gravity" and "Inner Beauty", with the latter also appearing as an instrumental acoustic version.

=== Matters to Me (2016–present) ===
On 19 February 2016, the release of digital single "Shut Up (Move On)" was announced. The single is taken from Talbot's studio album Matters to Me, a 13-track album with a bonus track available only on iTunes. The album was released on 25 March 2016.

On 11 May 2017, Connie Talbot released a song called "Good to Me", which she stated is "about a person who I admired, respected and who taught me so much. That person sadly passed away and I wrote this song from my heart." On 13 October 2017, Connie released a video for the song "Rumours".

In April 2019 she collaborated with Boyce Avenue covering the Jonas Brothers song "Sucker". The following month she also covered "Can You Feel the Love Tonight" from The Lion King with the band.

On 31 August 2019 Talbot took part in Britain's Got Talent: The Champions with an original composition, "Never Give Up on Us". The song was released the same day. By the following day, the song had reached number eight on the U.K. iTunes chart.

On 27 January 2020 she competed on America's Got Talent: The Champions, where she performed her romantic original song "I Would" on the piano.

In January 2022 she went back to collaborating with Boyce Avenue and helped cover the Bryan Adams song "(Everything I Do) I Do It for You". The following month they covered the Lionel Richie song "Endless Love".

On 1 June 2023, she released her new single "Easier Pretending You're Dead" from her then-upcoming EP Growing Pains.

On 14 July 2023, she released her new single "Growing Pains".

The EP Growing Pains was released on 25 August 2023, also featuring "Just a Broken Heart" and "Roses".

Talbot will play the main character, Ellie, in the upcoming movie The Key to the West.

Her latest EP “Original” was released on 15th May 2026 featuring 5 new songs, additionally a CD version of the EP was released independently and distributed through Kartel Music Group which includes 3 acoustic versions of songs off the EP plus her interpolation version of Happy Together by The Turtles.

== Personal life ==
Talbot has two older siblings. In 2006, she sang at her grandmother's funeral.

== Discography ==
=== Albums ===
Title	Details	Peak chart positions								Sales	Certifications
Title	Details	UK	HKG	SIN	KOR	TWN	US Heat	US Kid	US Indie	Sales	Certifications
Over the Rainbow	Released: 26 November 2007; Format: Digital download, CD; Label: Rainbow Recording Company	35	1	3	1	1	7	8	43	KOR: 30,000; Worldwide: 250,000	UK: Gold; HKG: Platinum; KOR: 2× Platinum; TWN: Platinum
Connie Talbot's Christmas Album	Released: 24 November 2008; Format: Digital download, CD; Label: Rainbow Recording Company	93	—	—	—	—	—	—	—		
Connie Talbot's Holiday Magic	Released: 20 October 2009; Format: Digital download, CD; Label: AAO Music	—	—	—	—	—	—	—	—		
Beautiful World	Released: 28 November 2012; Format: Digital download, CD; Label: Evosound	—	7	—	—	1	—	—	—		
Matters to Me	Released: 25 March 2016; Format: Digital download, CD; Label: Evolution Music Group	—	12	—	—	12	—	—	—		
"—" denotes an album that did not chart or was not released in that territory.

=== Video albums ===
Title	Details
Holiday Magic	Released: 2009; Label: AAO Music, WVIA-TV; Formats: DVD
Beautiful World Live	Released: 2014; Label: Evolution; Formats: DVD, Blu-ray

=== Extended plays ===
Title	Details
Gravity	Released: 17 November 2014; Label: Evosound, Evolution; Formats: Digital download, CD
Growing Pains	Released: 25 August 2023; Label: Venice; Format: Digital download
Original	Released: 15 May 2026; Label: Independent; Format: Digital download, CD

=== Singles ===
Year	Title	Peak chart positions			Album
Year	Title	UK Indie	SCO	US HSS	Album
2008	"Three Little Birds"	3	—	1	Over the Rainbow
2009	"I Will Always Love You"	—	—	3	Over the Rainbow
2011	"Beautiful World"	—	—	—	Beautiful World
2012	"Sail Away"	—	—	—	Non-album singles
2014	"Heroes"	—	—	—	Non-album singles
2015	"Lay Me Down"	—	—	—	Non-album singles
2016	"Shut Up (Move On)"	—	—	—	Matters to Me
2016	"P.S."	—	—	—	Matters to Me
2017	"Good to Me"	—	—	—	Non-album single
2019	"Never Give Up on Us"	—	20	—	TBA
2020	"I Would"	—	—	—	TBA
2023	"Easier Pretending You're Dead"	—	—	—	Growing Pains
2023	"Growing Pains"	—	—	—	Growing Pains
"—" denotes a single that did not chart or was not released.

=== Other appearances ===
Year	Title	Album	Notes
2013	"Let's Get Along"	ONE Campaign's agit8 Spotify album	Written by Kipper, Pete Bellotte and Bradley Mair; Produced by Kipper
2013	"Building Bridges" (featuring Jordan Jansen)	ONE Campaign's agit8 Spotify album	Written by Talbot; Produced by Toby Gad
2013	"A Tale Only the Rain Knows"	Rain (Soundtrack)	Theme song, "Clair de Lune" by Claude Debussy; Arranged by the game's composer Yugo Kanno

=== Music videos ===
Year	Title	Director
2008	"Three Little Birds"	—N/a
2012	"Beautiful World"	—N/a
2013	"Over the Rainbow"	—N/a
2013	"I Have a Dream"	—N/a
2013	"Smile"	—N/a
2013	"Beautiful World"	—N/a
2013	"Let It Be"	—N/a
2013	"Count On Me"	—N/a
2013	"Hero"	—N/a
2013	"Heal the World"	—N/a
2013	"White Christmas"	—N/a
2013	"The Climb"	—N/a
2013	"Amazing Grace"	—N/a
2013	"Colours of the Wind"	—N/a
2013	"Pray"	—N/a
2013	"Gift of a Friend"	—N/a
2013	"What the World Needs Now"	—N/a
2014	"Heroes"	—N/a
2014	"Mr. Blue Sky"	Oscar May
2014	"Let It Go"	Oscar May
2015	"Inner Beauty"	Oscar May
2015	"Gravity"	Linda Ludwig & James David Curle
2016	"Shut Up (Move On)"	—N/a
2016	"I'm Over You"	Ian Gamester
2016	"This Is Home"	—N/a
2017	"Good to Me"	Oscar May
2017	"Rumours"	Connie Talbot
2023	"Easier Pretending You’re Dead”	—
2023	"Growing Pains”	—
2024	“Wonderland Skies”	
2026	“Pink Champagne”	Connie Talbot
