= Christophe Coppée =

French bartender and mixologist

Christophe Coppée (born 1974, France), is a French bartender and mixologist. He has worked closely with bartenders, including Atilla Iskifoglu, Neil Lowrey and Neil Garner, as well as Frédéric Sharp of Mixillusion. In 2002, during an event organised at the Covent Garden in London, Coppée won the Guinness World Record for the most cocktails made (created) in one hour.

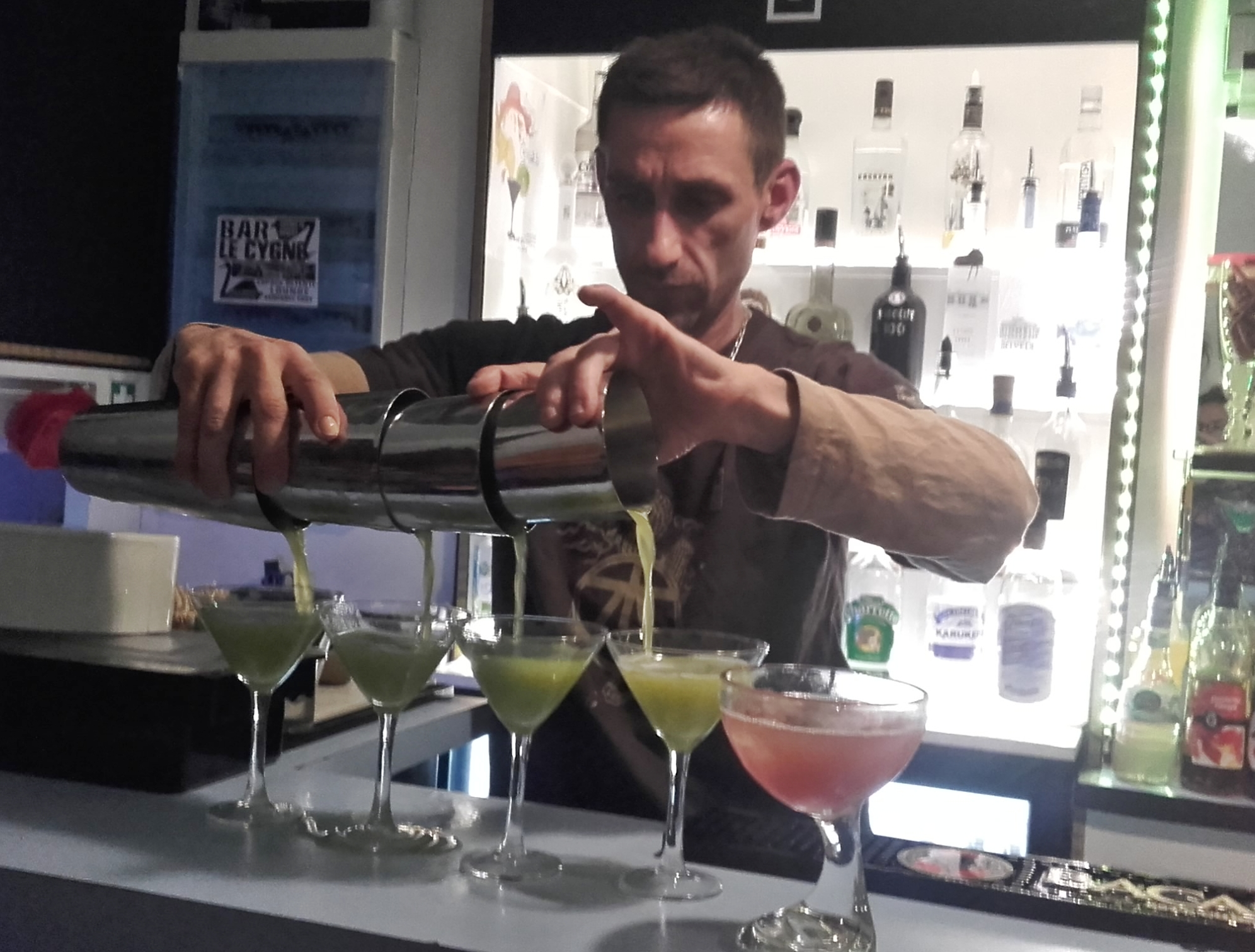
Christophe Coppée - Mixology Bartending

Sir Delynwell and five other jury assisted at the official tasting in front of BBC television along with more than two thousand people. He has developed new cocktail recipes for drink companies such as Wyborowa Exquisite Single Estate Vodka, Appleton Rum, Polstar vodka, Advoscotch, Tuaca liqueur, Pago fruit juices.

In 2016, Coppée opened a cocktail bar lounge in France where he operated without any drink menu.
