= Three Little Birds =

1977 song by Bob Marley and the Wailers

Single by Bob Marley and the Wailers

from the album Exodus
- B-side: "Every Need Got an Ego to Feed"
- Released: 29 August 1980
- Recorded: 1977
- Genre: Roots reggae
- Length: 3:01
- Label: Tuff Gong
- Songwriter: Bob Marley
- Producer: Bob Marley and the Wailers

Bob Marley and the Wailers singles chronology
"Could You Be Loved" (1980)	"Three Little Birds" (1980)	"Redemption Song" (1980)

Music video
- "Three Little Birds" on YouTube

"Three Little Birds" is a song by Bob Marley and the Wailers. It is the fourth track on side two of their 1977 album Exodus and was released as a single in 1980. The song reached the Top 20 in the UK, peaking at number 17. It is one of Marley's most popular songs and has been covered by numerous other artists. The song is often thought to be named "Don't Worry About a Thing" or "Every Little Thing is Gonna Be Alright", because of the prominent and repeated use of these phrases in the chorus.

== Writing and inspiration ==
Marley's inspiration for the lyrics of "Three Little Birds" remains disputed. Some believe Marley was using birds as a metaphor for the way Jamaicans grew cannabis. Some believe the lyrics are partly inspired by birds that Marley was fond of that used to fly and sit next to his home. Tony Gilbert, a friend of Marley's when the song was written, said, "Bob got inspired by a lot of things around him. He observed life. I remember the three little birds. They were pretty birds, canaries, who would come by the windowsill at Hope Road." However, three female singers from the reggae group I Threes who did shows with Marley claim it is a reference to them. I Threes member Marcia Griffiths said, "After the song was written, Bob would always refer to us as the Three Little Birds. After a show, there would be an encore; sometimes people even wanted us to go back onstage four times. Bob would still want to go back and he would say, 'What is my Three Little Birds saying?'"

The song is written in the key of A major.

== Charts ==
=== Weekly charts ===
Chart (1980)	Peak position
Germany (GfK)	49
Spain (AFYVE)	3
UK Singles (OCC)	17

== Certifications ==
Region	Certification	Certified units/sales
Brazil (Pro-Música Brasil)	Gold	30,000^{‡}
Denmark (IFPI Danmark)	Platinum	90,000^{‡}
Germany (BVMI)	Gold	250,000^{‡}
Italy (FIMI) sales since 2009	Platinum	70,000^{‡}
New Zealand (RMNZ)	6× Platinum	180,000^{‡}
Spain (Promusicae)	Platinum	60,000^{‡}
United Kingdom (BPI) sales since 2004	3× Platinum	1,800,000^{‡}
^{‡} Sales+streaming figures based on certification alone.

== Monty Alexander version ==
"Three Little Birds"

Single by Monty Alexander

from the album Stir it up - The Music of Bob Marley
- Released: 25 September 1999
- Genre: Jazz, Reggae
- Label: Telarc International Corporation
- Songwriter: Bob Marley

Monty Alexander produced and recorded a jazz-heavy cover of "Three Little Birds" in January 1992; he released it as a single in 1999.

=== Track listings ===
Side one
No.	Title	Writer(s)	Length
1.	"Three Little Birds"	Bob Marley	3:00

Side two
No.	Title	Writer(s)	Length
2.	"Could You Be Loved"	Bob Marley	2:50

== Connie Talbot version ==
"Three Little Birds"

Single by Connie Talbot

from the album Over the Rainbow
- B-side: "You Raise Me Up"
- Released: 10 June 2008
- Genre: Reggae
- Length: 3:08
- Label: Rainbow Recording Company
- Songwriter: Bob Marley
- Producers: Simon Hill and Rob May

Music video
- Three Little Birds on YouTube

"Three Little Birds" was released as the first single by British child singer Connie Talbot on 10 June 2008. It was taken from the 2008 re-release of her 2007 album, Over the Rainbow. Talbot released a music video to publicise the single, which was filmed in Jamaica. The release reached number 3 on the UK Independent Singles Chart, and number 1 on the Billboard Hot Singles Sales chart in the United States.

=== Background ===
After rising to fame on the first series of Britain's Got Talent, Talbot signed with Rainbow Recording Company and began production of her debut album, Over the Rainbow. The album initially featured several Christmas themed songs, and the first single, "Over the Rainbow"/"White Christmas", was planned be released on 3 December 2007. The single was then cancelled in favour of an album-first release. The album was rereleased with more general tracks to replace the Christmas songs, and one of the new tracks was a cover of Bob Marley's "Three Little Birds". The songs on the album were chosen with collaboration between Talbot and her management; first Talbot and her family wrote "a list of the songs that Connie would sing at her birthday party", and the management then thought "long and hard" about including the more adult songs, including "I Will Always Love You", but Talbot herself insisted. The album was recorded in a bedroom studio, nicknamed "the hut".

=== Release and reception ===
"Three Little Birds" was released as Talbot's first single on 10 June 2008 in the UK, and released alongside the album in the U.S. on 14 October. Rashvin Bedi, writing for Malaysian newspaper The Star, said that "Three Little Birds" was her favourite song on Over the Rainbow. The single peaked at number 3 on the Independent Singles Charts in the United Kingdom, and entered the Billboard Hot Singles Sales chart at number 2, dropping to 3 the next week. It then rose back to number 2, and, on the sixth week, reached number 1. Talbot received attention from the British press because of the single's success, with the Daily Telegraph attributing her success in America to her appeal to the Christian market. As of November 2008, the single has sold more than 250,000 copies worldwide.

=== Music video ===
The music video for the single was released on 19 June 2008. It was shot in Jamaica in late March/early April 2008.

The video begins with images of Talbot skipping through a garden, which is then replaced with an image of her singing on a beach. She then joins a child whose parents had been arguing and plays with them and others in a field, then dances with them on the beach. The children are then led to a stage, where Talbot performs as the others sing and play musical instruments. The video closes with Talbot in the garden, skipping away from the camera.

=== Chart performance ===
Chart	Country	Peak	Date
Independent Singles Charts	United Kingdom	3	20 June 2008
Hot Singles Sales	United States	1	27 November 2008

=== Track listing ===
No.	Title	Lyrics	Music	Length
1.	"Three Little Birds"	Bob Marley	Bob Marley	3:08
2.	"You Raise Me Up"	Brendan Graham	Rolf Løvland	4:04
