= Over the Rainbow (Connie Talbot album) =

Studio album by Connie Talbot
- Released: 26 November 2007
- Recorded: Olympic Studios, 2007–2008
- Genre: Pop
- Length: 38:41 (Original); 38:18 (Rerelease)
- Label: Rainbow Recording Company
- Producer: Simon Hill and Rob May

Connie Talbot chronology
| Over the Rainbow (2007) | Connie Talbot's Christmas Album (2008) |

Over the Rainbow is the debut album by child singer Connie Talbot, and was released 26 November 2007 by Rainbow Recording Company. Talbot entered the public eye after her appearance on the first series of Britain's Got Talent at age six. Over the Rainbow consists entirely of covers of pop and Christmas songs, and was recorded primarily in a spare room in the house of Talbot's aunt, in an attempt not to interrupt Talbot's childhood by disrupting her regular activities. Although public appearances were initially kept to a minimum, Talbot did make appearances to promote the album, and performed in public several times after the British release.

Over the Rainbow received poor reviews. Though praising Talbot's voice, critics noted a lack of depth in the performances, and questioned the appropriateness of releasing and rating work by such a young artist. The album peaked at number 35 on the UK Albums Chart. Despite its poor chart performance, additional copies of the album had to be pressed after sales were higher than expected. Talbot later toured Asia in support of the album; Over the Rainbow achieved more success on Asian charts, reaching number one in Taiwan, South Korea and Hong Kong.

Over the Rainbow was rereleased on 18 June 2008 with an updated track list, replacing some of the Christmas-themed tracks of the original with more general covers. The first single from the album, a cover of Bob Marley's "Three Little Birds", was released in June 2008, and a music video for the song was shot in Jamaica. On 14 October, the album was released in the US, appearing on several Billboard charts. Talbot visited the US to promote the album, appearing on national television.

== Recording and release ==
Connie Talbot entered the public eye appearing, aged six, on the first series of the reality programme Britain's Got Talent, reaching the final. To produce her first album Over the Rainbow, Talbot worked with John Arnison, then-manager to Gabrielle and Billy Ocean, and Marc Marot, a former managing director of Island Records. It was produced and mixed by Simon Hill and Rob May. Talbot said that "it was just amazing that we could do it in my auntie's house". Arnison and Marot asked the Talbot family to "write down a list of the songs that Connie would sing at her birthday party" to help choose the track listing, and then "thought long and hard" about including more adult songs on the album. Talbot herself insisted that they should.

The final version of Over the Rainbow was recorded at Olympic Studios, on 12 October 2007. Arnison described the recording process by saying that Talbot "hadn't sung nursery rhymes; she'd always sung classic tracks. So it was actually quite an easy task to make the record". The album was released on 26 November 2007 through Rainbow Recording Company, with an initial pressing of 50,000 copies. However, an additional 120,000 had to be created after the album sold out in a matter of days.

Over the Rainbow was re-released on 18 June 2008, with the new version being made available for pre-order in May. The re-release featured three new tracks to replace the Christmas-themed songs on the original album. The new tracks were made available from Talbot's official website so that those who bought the original need not buy the re-release. Over the Rainbow was released in the US on 14 October, and Talbot travelled to the country with her family to publicise it. Talbot's cover of "I Will Always Love You" was released as a single in the US on 7 April, along with a newly recorded version of "You Raise Me Up". Music videos for "Over the Rainbow", "I Have a Dream", "Smile" and "White Christmas" would be released later in 2013. (Note: Attributed to multiple sources:)

=== "Three Little Birds" ===
"Three Little Birds"

Single by Connie Talbot

from the album Over the Rainbow
- B-side: "You Raise Me Up"
- Released: 10 June 2008
- Length: 3:08
- Label: Rainbow Recording Company
- Songwriter: Bob Marley
- Producers: Simon Hill and Rob May

Music video
- Three Little Birds on YouTube

"Three Little Birds" was released as a single on 10 June 2008 in the UK, and was released alongside the album in the US on 14 October. Bedi, writing for the Malaysian newspaper The Star, said that "Three Little Birds" was her favourite song on Over the Rainbow.

The single peaked at number 3 on the Independent Singles Charts in the United Kingdom, and entered the Billboard Hot Singles Sales chart at number 2, dropping to 3 the next week. It then raised back to number 2, and, on the sixth week, reached number 1. As of November 2008, the single has sold more than 250,000 copies worldwide. Talbot received attention from the British press because of the single's success, with the Daily Telegraph attributing her success in America to her appeal to the Christian market.

Talbot's father, Gavin, spoke about the song reaching number one, saying "When we received the phone call we were driving back from doing a round of radio interviews in London and Connie was asleep in the back of the car. When we told her she just took it in her stride. I just cannot believe that she is number one in America. We are all very proud of her. It is a big achievement – people have just taken a shine to her." He also said it was "a big shock to hear she was number one. It is tremendous."

The music video for "Three Little Birds" was released on 19 June 2008, which was shot in Jamaica in late March/early April 2008. Talbot was quoted as saying that the travel to Jamaica was "the best thing I've done this year". The video begins with images of Talbot skipping through a garden, which is then replaced with an image of her singing on a beach. She then joins a child whose parents had been arguing and plays with them and others in a field, then dances with them on the beach. The children are then lead to a stage, where Talbot performs as the others sing and play musical instruments. The video closes with Talbot in the garden, skipping away from the camera.

=== Cancelled video game tie-in ===
In August 2008, it was announced that Talbot had signed a contract with Data Design Interactive for production of a video game on the Wii console. The game was to feature 15 songs from Over the Rainbow, allowing players to sing along with full-motion video footage of Talbot or against other players in a karaoke mode. Talbot re-recorded the album for the game. The game was scheduled for release in the first quarter of 2009, and was to be called Connie Talbot: Over the Rainbow, but was quietly cancelled due to licensing reasons over the songs to be used. A prototype build of the game surfaced in 2020 and was purchased by video game preservationist Forest of Illusion, who later uploaded a disk image of the game on the Internet Archive.

== Publicity ==
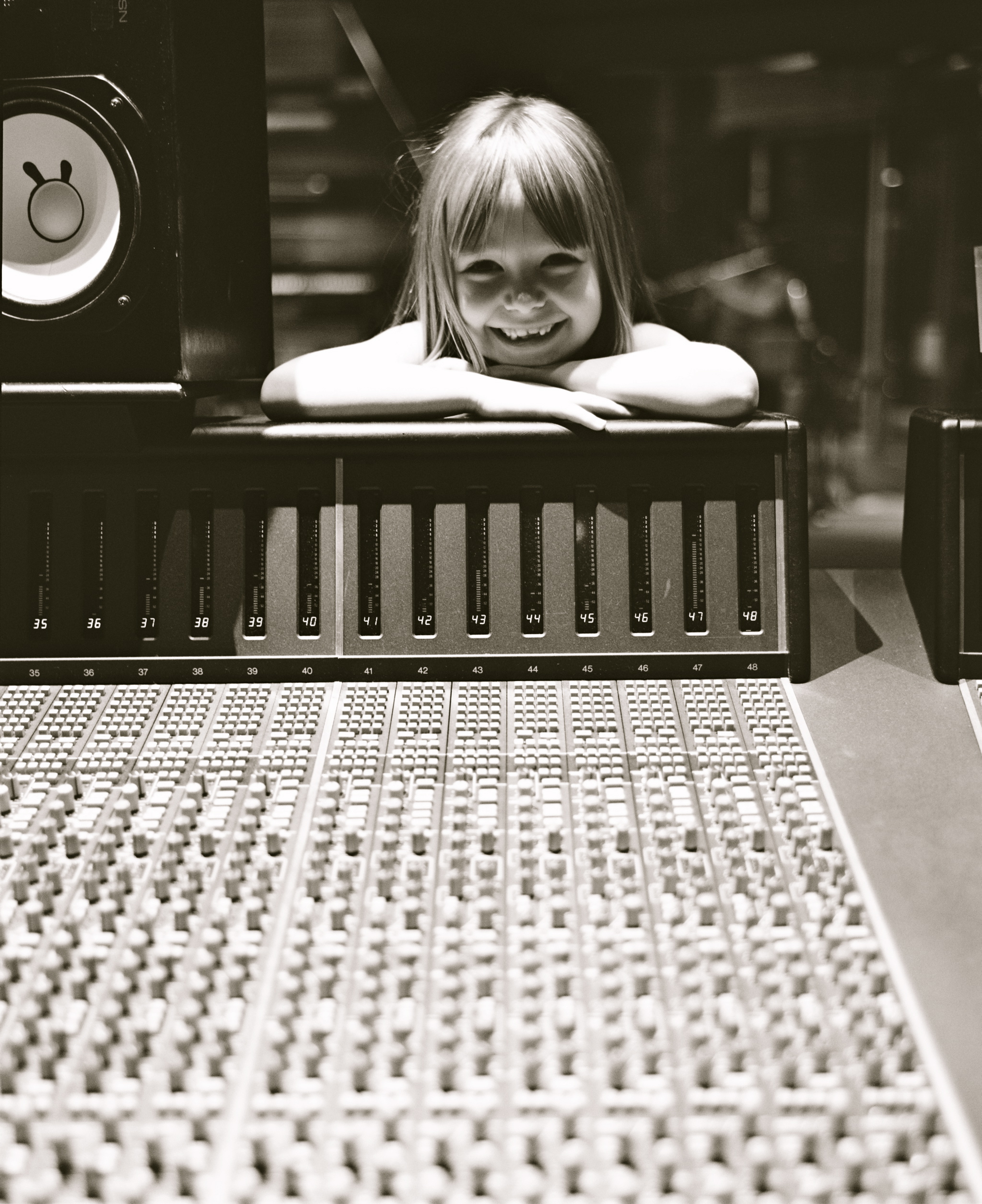
A publicity shot of Talbot taken during the recording of Over the Rainbow at Olympic Studios (12 October 2007).

Talbot made several public appearances after the release of Over the Rainbow. These included headlining the Great Bridge Christmas and Winter Festival, which local police threatened to cancel unless crowds clamouring to reach the tent in which Talbot was performing could be brought under control. At the event, on 7 December 2007, Talbot was quoted as saying "I love it here, it's brilliant, really fun", but she had to be ushered off-stage by the police. Talbot performed publicly in Walsall's HMV store, and in Birmingham's Centenary Square. TV appearances included slots on GMTV and 5 News, both on the day of the album's release.

In April and May 2008, Talbot toured Asia to promote Over the Rainbow. Asian journalists attributed her success in the region to her videos on YouTube, with writers for the Sun.Star noting that her most-viewed video had been watched over 14 million times, and Bernard Koh, of The Straits Times, saying that videos of Talbot's performances had been watched over 30 million times. The tour made stops in South Korea, Taiwan, Hong Kong and Singapore, and Talbot and her family returned to England in late May.

News that Over the Rainbow was to be released in the US resulted in Talbot receiving attention from American press sources including Fox Business Network and MarketWatch. Kerri Mason, writing for Reuters, described Talbot's videos as "viral", and added that she had been watched on YouTube over 46 million times. Talbot travelled to the US for a promotional tour to coincide with the release, where she performed on The Ellen DeGeneres Show and appeared as a guest on The Oprah Winfrey Show. She made appearances in Los Angeles, Philadelphia, New York City and Washington, D.C. Following the television appearances, sales of the album were boosted in the US. Talbot again travelled to the US to promote her single "I Will Always Love You" in April 2009, returning again in May. Appearances included a performance on Good Day New York on Fox Broadcasting Company's WNYW.

== Critical reception ==
Professional ratings
Review scores
| Source | Rating |
|---|---|
| AllMusic | 2/5 stars |
| Digital Spy | 2/5 stars |

Over the Rainbow received negative reviews from music critics. Sharon Mawer, of AllMusic, praised Talbot, saying that she "can sing, for a seven-year-old, and most of the notes (if not all of them) are in the right order and sung to the right pitch; the timing is fine too". However, she argued that the album had "no feeling, no emotion, no realization of what each song is about". Mawer ultimately gave Over the Rainbow a rating of two out of five stars. Nick Levine, writing for Digital Spy, said in a review of the album that Talbot had a "sweet, pure voice", but that there is "no nuance or depth to her performance". Though awarding the album two out of five, he said that "there's something inherently wrong about awarding a star rating to a seven-year-old", and that "the decidedly adult concept of musical merit should have nothing to do with [her music]".

Reviewers writing in the British newspaper the Harlow Star also commented on Talbot's age, saying that "there's no doubt she's a sweet little girl with a nice voice", but asking whether there is "something inherently wrong with thrusting a child into the limelight at such a young age". Rashvin Bedi, writing for Malaysian newspaper The Star, praised the album, saying that "Connie sings with ease and manages the high notes admirably", but asked whether "people would buy an album of the same songs sung by a 20-year-old".

== Chart performance and sales ==
The album entered in the British album charts at 35 on 8 December 2007, but was at the bottom of the charts by Christmas, despite having been tipped as a potential Christmas number one. It remained in the charts for five weeks, peaking at 35. However, the album was certified gold in Britain in early December, with Talbot being presented a gold disc by Phillip Schofield on daytime television programme This Morning.

Following Talbot's tour of Asia, it was reported that the album had reached number one on the charts in Taiwan, South Korea and Hong Kong, as well as reaching number three in Singapore. The album has received platinum certification in Taiwan and Hong Kong, and double platinum in Korea, selling 30,000 copies. In the US, the album appeared on three charts. It featured on the Top Heatseekers chart for nine weeks, peaking at number 7, on the Kid Albums chart for four weeks, peaking at number 8, and on Top Independent Albums chart for one week, at number 43.

== Track listings ==
=== Original track listing ===
| No. | Title | Writer(s) | Length |
|---|---|---|---|
| 1. | "Over the Rainbow" | Harold Arlen, E. Y. Harburg | 2:52 |
| 2. | "I Believe" | Ervin Drake, Irvin Graham, Jimmy Shirl, Al Stillman | 2:58 |
| 3. | "White Christmas" | Irving Berlin | 3:15 |
| 4. | "Smile" | Charlie Chaplin, Geoffrey Claremont Parsons, John Turner | 2:48 |
| 5. | "Imagine" | John Lennon | 3:05 |
| 6. | "Walking in the Air" | Howard Blake | 3:32 |
| 7. | "Favourite Things" | Richard Rodgers, Oscar Hammerstein II | 2:37 |
| 8. | "What a Wonderful World" | Bob Thiele, George David Weiss | 2:21 |
| 9. | "Ben" | Don Black, Walter Scharf | 2:46 |
| 10. | "I Will Always Love You" | Dolly Parton | 4:25 |
| 11. | "Silent Night" | Franz Gruber | 3:29 |
| 12. | "I Have a Dream" | Benny Andersson, Björn Ulvaeus | 4:33 |
| Total length: | | | 38:41 |

=== Re-release track listing ===
| No. | Title | Writer(s) | Length |
|---|---|---|---|
| 1. | "Over the Rainbow" | Harold Arlen, E. Y. Harburg | 2:51 |
| 2. | "I Believe" | Ervin Drake, Irvin Graham, Jimmy Shirl, Al Stillman | 2:58 |
| 3. | "Smile" | Charlie Chaplin, Geoffrey Claremont Parsons, John Turner | 2:48 |
| 4. | "Three Little Birds" | Bob Marley | 3:05 |
| 5. | "Imagine" | John Lennon | 3:05 |
| 6. | "Favourite Things" | Richard Rodgers, Oscar Hammerstein II | 2:37 |
| 7. | "Any Dream Will Do" | Andrew Lloyd Webber, Tim Rice | 3:49 |
| 8. | "What a Wonderful World" | Bob Thiele, George David Weiss | 2:21 |
| 9. | "Ben" | Don Black, Walter Scharf | 2:45 |
| 10. | "I Will Always Love You" | Dolly Parton | 4:24 |
| 11. | "I Have a Dream" | Benny Andersson, Björn Ulvaeus | 4:31 |
| 12. | "You Raise Me Up" | Rolf Løvland, Brendan Graham | 4:04 |
| Total length: | | | 39:18 |
