= Connie Talbot's Holiday Magic =

Studio album by Connie Talbot
- Released: 13 October 2009
- Genre: Pop
- Label: AAO Music
- Producer: Simon Hill; Rob May

Connie Talbot chronology
Connie Talbot's Christmas Album (2008)	Connie Talbot's Holiday Magic (2009)	Beautiful World (2012)

Connie Talbot's Holiday Magic, also known as Connie Talbot's Christmas Magic, is the third album by British child singer Connie Talbot. Released 13 October 2009 by AAO Music, it features rerecordings of songs from Talbot's previous album, Connie Talbot's Christmas Album, as well as new tracks. The album was released after Talbot was named child ambassador for the Toys for Tots Campaign, and some of the proceeds from the album were given to the organisation. The album was marketed with a tour of the United States, a cross-marketing campaign with Boscov's, and a television special produced by WVIA, a DVD of which was later released for sale. Reviews of the album were mixed; while Talbot was called "sweet" and her range was praised, other reviewers considered the album to be "cloying" and "little more than a novelty act".

== Production ==
In September 2009, it was announced that Talbot had been named child ambassador of the Marine Corps Toys for Tots Campaign, a charitable programme which purchases toys for underprivileged American children. It was announced that, in addition to promoting the drive on adverts and on television, Talbot's forthcoming album, Connie Talbot's Holiday Magic, would be dedicated to the campaign. Further, a portion of the proceeds from the sales of the album were to be donated to the charity. Talbot said that upon being declared ambassador, she was "I'm sad and happy—sad because I'm learning there are so many children who are not as lucky as I am, and I'm happy that I'm able to help them." Vice-president of the Toys for Tots Foundation Bill Grein said:

The Marine Toys for Tots Foundation is extremely proud and excited to have Connie as our youngest ambassador ever ... She is the perfect person to inform the public of the millions of less fortunate children who may be overlooked this Christmas holiday season, unless people step up to donate a toy or make a cash contribution. Her angelic looks and voice will remind everyone of the innocence of children ... And they all deserve to experience the magic of the holiday season! I hope she sells lots of CDs and raises a lot of money and awareness for our children.

The track listing of Connie Talbot's Holiday Magic was compiled by people including Talbot's family and friends, and AAO Music manager Peter Kuys; of the tracks, Talbot said that her favourite was "When a Child Is Born". Some of the songs had previously appeared on Connie Talbot's Christmas Album, and Talbot's official site describes Connie Talbot's Holiday Magic as "re-launched". However, Connie Talbot's Holiday Magic also featured three new songs, and the album's vocals were completely rerecorded.

== Release and promotion ==
Connie Talbot's Holiday Magic was released on 13 October 2009, by the Albany-based record label AAO Music. The release was promoted by a United States tour and a television special. The special, entitled Holiday Magic, was taped from 24 to 27 September, and produced by WVIA. Holiday Magic featured performances of all of the songs from Connie Talbot's Holiday Magic, and was available to all PBS stations to be shown in November and December. On the special, Talbot performed with a choir from Scranton High School. A 17-track DVD of the performance, featuring all of the songs from Connie Talbot's Holiday Magic, and two additional songs, "What a Wonderful World" and "Over the Rainbow", was produced. In addition, the DVD featured an interview with Talbot and behind the scenes footage.

Appearances in the United States included performances at the Colonie Center. In addition, Talbot participated in a cross-marketing campaign with Boscov's; she received signage and merchandising at Boscov's stores, and wore Boscov's clothes. Albert Boscov, of Boscov's, said "We're thrilled that Connie—such a talented youngster—is joining us to bring a little holiday magic to everyone this holiday season." Kuys, of AAO Music, said "We have had a long relationship with Boscov's over the last decade. This campaign was personally picked by Mr. Boscov, and we feel that both parties can be perfect for each other while adding great value to Connie's Toys for Tots campaign."

== Reception ==
Professional ratings
Review scores
Source	Rating
The Philadelphia Daily News	(B−)
The Salt Lake Tribune	(B)

Connie Talbot's Holiday Magic received mixed reviews. Sunny Tse, reviewing the album for the South China Morning Post, said that the album was "just right for the kids", but added that Talbot's "stunning rendition of 'Ave Maria' ... will blow your mind". Jonathan Takiff, writing for The Philadelphia Daily News, said that "[l]istening to her trill through 'Silent Night,' the calypso-flavored 'Mary's Boy Child' and 'Rockin' Around the Christmas Tree' might inspire your kids." He gave the album a B−. David Burger, writing for The Salt Lake Tribune, gave the album a B, and praised Talbot's range, saying that there were "sweet, playful and jazzy arrangements". Reviewers also praised the link with the Toys for Tots Foundation, which Tse considered "one more reason why you should grab a copy."

While Tse described Talbot's voice as "sweet" and "beautiful", and Takiff called her "a freak of nature, with a grown-up singing voice in the body of a (just-turned) 9-year-old", other reviewers were more critical. Jon Bream, of the Minneapolis Star Tribune, called the album "more cloying than cute", and David Yonke, writing for The Blade, described Talbot's performance as "little more than a novelty act because of the overly sappy backdrop". Yonke did praise Talbot for her "impressive vocal skills", but considered her "earnestness [as] wasted on arrangements that sound as if they were ripped from a 1930s Shirley Temple songbook". Wayne Bledsoe, writing for ScrippsNews, said that Talbot "has a great voice for a kid", but added that "this album wore me out. Maybe it's the never-ending vibrato."

== Credits ==
- Dave Bishop – Clarinet, saxophone
- Ben Castle – Clarinet, flute
- Laurence Cottle – Arrangement
- Elspeth Dutch – French horn
- Sid Gauld – Trumpet
- Graham Harvey – Piano
- Simon Hill – Arrangement, drums, editing, mixing, percussion, production, programming
- Chris Jackson – Photography
- Debbie Johnson – Backing vocals
- Noel Langley – Trumpet
- Hank Linderman – Acoustic guitar, electric guitar
- Rob May – Arrangement, bass, editing, keyboards, mixing, piano, production, programming
- Mark Nightingale – Trombone
- Andy Panayi – Alto saxophone, flute
- Phil Robson – Guitar
- Ralph Salmins – Drums
- Jamie Talbot – Flute, tenor saxophone
- Nichol Thompson – Trombone
- Pat White – Trumpet
- Martin Williams – Flute, tenor saxophone
- Andy Wood – Trombone

== Track listing ==
No.	Title	Writer(s)	Length
1.	"Have Yourself a Merry Little Christmas"	Hugh Martin and Ralph Blane	2:47
2.	"White Christmas"	Irving Berlin	3:15
3.	"Silent Night"	Josef Mohr (lyricist – German) and Franz Xaver Gruber (composer)	3:28
4.	"It's Beginning to Look a Lot Like Christmas"	Meredith Willson	2:14
5.	"Do You Hear What I Hear?"	Noël Regney (lyricist) and Gloria Shayne Baker (composer)	3:22
6.	"Mary's Boy Child"	Jester Hairston	3:32
7.	"O Little Town of Bethlehem"	Phillips Brooks (lyricist) and Lewis Redner (composer)	3:55
8.	"When a Child Is Born"	Fred Jay (lyricist) and Zacar (composer)	3:07
9.	"Frosty the Snowman"	Jack Rollins and Steve Nelson	2:47
10.	"Rockin' Around the Christmas Tree"	Johnny Marks	2:34
11.	"Santa Claus Is Coming to Town"	J. Fred Coots and Haven Gillespie	2:58
12.	"Walking in the Air"	Howard Blake	3:31
13.	"Ave Maria"	Vladimir Vavilov	2:50
14.	"I Believe in Father Christmas" (Bonus track)	Greg Lake and Peter Sinfield	3:30
