= Beautiful World (Connie Talbot album) =

Studio album by Connie Talbot
- Released: 26 November 2012
- Genre: Pop
- Length: 47:39
- Label: Evosound
- Producer: Kipper, Phil Taylor

Connie Talbot chronology
Connie Talbot's Holiday Magic (2009)	Beautiful World (2012)	Gravity – EP (2014)

Beautiful World is the fourth studio album by Connie Talbot. It was released on 26 November 2012 by Hong Kong–based Evolution Media Ltd's Evosound label. It charted at number 1 in Taiwan. The album is produced by Grammy-winning producer Kipper together with Phil Taylor. The title track is a rerecorded version of Talbot's self-penned track "Beautiful World", previously released as a single in 2011.

Talbot promoted the album by performing in Hong Kong, Taiwan, the Philippines and Indonesia for her Beautiful World tour in December 2012. Her debut headline concert appearance was on 21 December at the Taiwan International Convention Centre in front of an audience of 1800. This was followed by two headline concerts at KITEC, Hong Kong. She also made guest appearances in several TV shows, namely Eat Bulaga!.

On 28 July 2014, a DVD and Blu-ray was released of Talbot’s concerts in Hong Kong and Taiwan during her Beautiful World tour in 2012. It features live performances of the songs from the Beautiful World album, and two additional songs, "I Will Always Love You" and "Over the Rainbow".

Since 26 November 2012, Connie Talbot released her fourth album Beautiful World, 3 years later after her previous album Connie Talbot's Holiday Magic, which was released on 20 October 2009

Since 26 November 2012, Connie Talbot released 10 Singles from her Beautiful World album within 4 years until her fifth album called Matters to Me was released on 25 March 2016

== Track listing ==
No.	Title	Writer(s)	Length
1.	"Count On Me"	Bruno Mars, The Smeezingtons	3:39
2.	"Let It Be"	John Lennon, Paul McCartney	3:58
3.	"The Climb"	Jessi Alexander, Jon Mabe	3:36
4.	"What the World Needs Now"	Hal David, Burt Bacharach	4:19
5.	"Fireflies"	Adam Young	3:04
6.	"Beautiful World"	Connie Talbot	4:32
7.	"Amazing Grace"	John Newton	3:56
8.	"Pray"	Justin Bieber, Adam Messinger, Nasri Atweh, Omar Martinez	3:29
9.	"Gift of a Friend"	Adam Watts, Andy Dodd, Demi Lovato	3:21
10.	"Imagine"	John Lennon	3:40
11.	"Colours of the Wind"	Alan Menken, Stephen Schwartz	4:06
12.	"Heal the World"	Michael Jackson	4:41
13.	"Hero"	Mariah Carey, Walter Afanasieff	3:58
Total length:			47:39

== Singles ==
"Beautiful World" was taken from Beautiful World, was released as Talbot's lead single, which was released on 22 November 2011 in the UK. The music video for the single Beautiful World was published on 22 December 2012 from her official Music Channel called ConnieTalbotOfficial on Youtube.

But a year later, Connie released the music video on the Youtube channel ConnieTalbotVEVO. It was released on 26 June 2013.

"Hero", taken from Beautiful World, was released as Talbot's second single in April 2013 in the UK. The music video for the single Hero was published on 5 April 2013.

"Heal The World", taken from Hero, was released as Talbot's third single in late April 2013 in the UK. The music video for the single Heal The World was published on 24 April 2013.

"Let It Be" was taken from Beautiful World, was released as Talbot's second single that came out on the same day as her other single Count On Me in 2013 in the UK. The music video for the single Let It Be was published on 14 June 2013.

"Count On Me" taken from Beautiful World, was released as Talbot's third single on 2013 in the UK, which was released on the same day as her other single Let It Be in 2013 in the UK. The music video for the single Let It Be was published on 14 June 2013.

"Colours of The Wind" taken from Beautiful World, was released as Talbot's sixth single in late 2013 in the UK. The music video for the single Colours of The Wind was published on 26 June 2013.

"Pray" taken from Beautiful World, was released as Talbot's seventh single in September 2013 in the UK. The music video for the single Pray was published on 28 September 2013.

"Gift Of A Friend" taken from Beautiful World, was released as Talbot's ninth single in December 2013, which was released on the same day as the Single What The World Needs Now in the UK. The music video for the single Gift Of A Friend was published on 23 December 2013.

"What The World Needs Now" taken from Beautiful World, was released as Talbot's tenth single in December 2013, which was released on the same day as the Single Gift Of A Friend in the UK. The music video for the single What The World Needs Now was published on 23 December 2013.

=== Promotional singles ===
"The Climb" taken from Beautiful World, was released as Talbot's first promotional single in June 2013 in the UK. The music video for The Climb was published on 19 June 2013.

"Amazing Grace" taken from Beautiful World, was released as Talbot's second promotional single near the end of June 2013 in the UK. The music video for the single Amazing Grace was published on 22 June 2013.

==== Chart performance ====
Chart	Country	Peak	Date
Independent Singles Charts	UK	3	20 June 2008
Hot Singles Sales	U.S.	1	27 November 2008

== Charts ==
Chart (2013)	Peak position
Hong Kong	7
Taiwan	1
