= My Phone Genie =

- Created by: Lee Walters
- Starring: Adam Wadsworth; Bessie Cursons; Fox Jackson-Keen; Haruka Abe; Heather Nicol; Lothaire Gérard; Ethan Hammer
- Countries of origin: United Kingdom; France; Ireland; Germany
- Original language: English
- No. of seasons: 1
- No. of episodes: 26 (list of episodes)

Production
- Executive producers: Tony Humphreys; Paul Cummins; Maïa Tubiana; Benoît di Sabatino; Christophe di Sabatino; Nicole Keeb; Katharina Pietzsch; Jamila Metran
- Producers: John Brady; Siobhán Ní Ghadhra
- Running time: 22 minutes
- Production companies: Talent Television; MoonScoop; Telegael; ZDF Enterprises

Original release
- Network: ITV (CITV) (UK); ZDF (Germany)
- Release: 1 January – 1 December 2012

My Phone Genie is a children's television comedy-drama series about a young girl with a genie in her mobile. It premiered on 1 January 2012 and aired on ITV and CITV.

== Production ==
My Phone Genie is co-produced by British company Talent Television, French company MoonScoop, and Irish company Telegael Teoranta, in association with CITV and German companies ZDF and ZDF Enterprises.

The series was announced in April 2011. MoonScoop and ZDF would handle global distribution rights except in Japan, which would be handled by Talent Television.

The series is aimed at international audiences aged 12+.

== Plot ==
A free ringtone summons a genie.

== Cast ==
- Bessie Cursons as Jaz
- Haruka Abe as Naoko
- Fox Jackson-Keen as Mobbsy
- Heather Nicol as Pene
- Ethan Hammer as Reese
- Lothaire Gérard as Brent
- Christine Mackie as Miss Hicks
- Nick Wymer as Principal Tubb
- Lauterio Zamparelli as Mr Duffy

== Episodes ==
No.	Title	Directed by	Written by	Original release date	Prod. code
1	"Serve and Protect"	Jeff Naylor	Lee Walters	1 January 2012	1.1
Worried about her first day at a new school, Gene’s help to protect Jaz gets her in more trouble than she could ever have imagined.
2	"Home Movie"	Tom Poole	Lee Walters	8 January 2012	1.2
Gene makes Jaz and her friends the stars in a selection of movies after Jaz wishes that her Saturday afternoon could be more interesting. But things start getting out of hand when pene is in the house to meaning that some of them have to stall Pene while others have to star in the film in each room to cancel them out before Pene goes in them.
3	"It's a Jungle in Here"	Tom Poole	Bryan Johnson	15 January 2012	1.3
Gene helps Jaz revive the school plants she's forgotten to water over the holidays...turning the house into a living jungle!
4	"Growing Pains"	Tom Poole	Marcus Fleming	22 January 2012	1.4
Annoyed at her younger brother’s silly antics, Jaz wishes he ‘would just grow up’. But the problem starts when Gene grants and made Reese into a full sized adult.
5	"The Sleepover"	Tom Poole	Lee Walters	29 January 2012	1.5
A sleepover at Jaz’s house has the kids play a game of ‘Truth or Dare’ with Gene choosing the dares!
6	"Talk to the Hair"	Jeff Naylor	Marcus Fleming	5 February 2012	1.6
Wishing for some confidence in the school debate, Jaz is surprised when Gene gives her hair a mind and uncontrollable attitude of its own.
7	"Cheat"	Jeff Naylor	Nigel Smith	12 February 2012	1.7
When Jaz wishes for help with her school project Gene downloads a cheat application for her which makes Jaz cheat at everything.
8	"Pene's Perfect Date"	Tom Poole	David Richard Fox	19 February 2012	1.8
Gene steps in to help find Pene the perfect date for the school dance which doesn’t go exactly to plan.
9	"Garage Band"	Tom Poole	Bryan Johnson	26 February 2012	1.9
Jaz, Mobbsy and Naoko form a rock band and with Gene as manager become an internet sensation.
10	"The Exciting Life of Jaz"	Jeff Naylor	Adam Long	4 March 2012	1.10
Jaz wishes for a more exciting life but doesn’t expect Gene to make her life into a reality show with her as the ‘star’.
11	"Clever"	Tom Poole	Jon Groves	11 March 2012	1.11
Gene grants Jaz a wish to show how smart she can be, but he makes her super smart at everything which brings its own problems.
12	"The Party"	Jeff Naylor	Bryan Johnson	18 March 2012	1.12
Gene throws a party in school detention which everybody else in the school soon wants to join in with.
13	"Double Losers"	Jeff Naylor	Lee Walters	25 March 2012	1.13
When Jaz gives her friends each a wish, Naoko ends up inside a video game…while Mobbsy has his own problems.
14	"Side FX"	Jeff Naylor	Dan Berlinka & Sean Carson	8 September 2012	1.14
When Mobbsy is too ill to perform in a talent contest, Gene makes him better, but the treatment has side effects!
15	"Jaz Plastic"	Tom Poole	Lee Walters	15 September 2012	1.15
Having lost Jaz in a wish gone wrong, Gene must figure out what she wished for and where she disappeared to.
16	"Unfriend Me"	Jeff Naylor	Marcus Fleming	22 September 2012	1.16
When Jaz wishes that her teacher were more friendly, Gene creates a whole new social network for her.
17	"Upgrades"	Tom Poole	Nigel Smith	29 September 2012	1.17
When Jaz needs to clean the house after a party, Gene gets all the household appliances to help. But they start getting carried away when they want a party themselves. As the vacuum cleaner is seen as the most boring appliance the rest of the appliances ditch the vacuum cleaner along with Jaz.
18	"Sisters"	Tom Poole	Richard Fegen	6 October 2012	1.18
Jaz wins tickets to a local concert and is soon battling her sister for who gets to go, though Gene may have a solution.
19	"Saving Face"	Jeff Naylor	Dave Cantor	13 October 2012	1.19
When Jaz wakes up with a pixelated face, Gene takes control of getting her through the day without it being noticed.
20	"Parents' Day"	Jeff Naylor	Dan Berlinka & Sean Carson	20 October 2012	1.20
Jaz is disappointed when her parents can’t attend Parents’ Day, so Gene creates far more interesting parents for her.
21	"Indoor Activities"	Jeff Naylor	Bryan Johnson	27 October 2012	1.21
When Jaz, Mobbsy and Naoko miss a school trip and get locked inside school overnight, Gene creates his own survival course for them.
22	"Grounded"	Tom Poole	Bryan Johnson	3 November 2012	1.22
Jaz breaks the family television and is grounded, so with Jaz not being able to leave her room, Gene brings the outside world to her.
23	"Technical Hitch"	Tom Poole	Jon Groves	10 November 2012	1.23
Jaz’s phone breaks and results in her being sent an older model with a much older Genie. Nobody ever reads the manual.
24	"Superheroes"	Jeff Naylor	Dan Berlinka & Sean Carson	17 November 2012	1.24
Jaz, Naoko and Mobbsy wish to be superheroes, but Gene gives them all rather unusual and not very superhero powers.
25	"Dumb and Dummy"	Jeff Naylor	Charlie Hodges & Bryan Johnson	24 November 2012	1.25
Gene grants Jaz’s wish to make fake things real, which leads to experiences that none of the team could ever have imagined. A CPR dummy comes to life which gives Naoko a chance to be his mother and look after him
26	"Mobbsy's Girlfriend"	Tom Poole	Lee Walters	1 December 2012	1.26
Mobbsy’s obsession with a new Girlfriend App on his phone has Gene take him and the girls inside the app in order to dump her.

== International broadcast ==
My Phone Genie airs on ITV and CITV in the United Kingdom and ZDF in Germany.
