= Fox Jackson-Keen =

English actor, singer and dancer

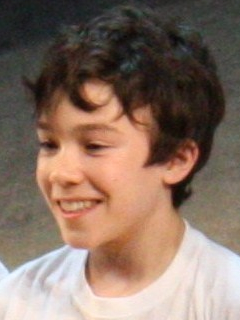
- Fox Jackson-Keen in March 2010
- Born: 14 May 1995 (age 31); Hornsey, England
- Occupations: Stage actor television actor singer dancer
- Years active: 2006–present

Fox Jackson-Keen (born 14 May 1995) is an English stage and television actor, singer and dancer. He is known for his shared performances in a two and a half-year run as the star role of 'Billy' in Billy Elliot the Musical at London's Victoria Palace Theatre. He has appeared as Mobbsy in the 26 episode live action children's comedy series, My Phone Genie, on ITV and CITV.

== Career ==
Jackson-Keen has appeared in a wide range of advertising campaigns and TV shows, and competed four times in the UK National Gymnastics finals. He received the first name of "Fox" because his father was a fan of the TV's The X Files. His father was a gymnast, and in initially followed in his father's footsteps, Fox entered and won several youth competitions before representing London in a national competition, where he came third. At 9-years-old in 2006, he started break-dancing and hip-hop, and then studied ballet and tap.

His broadcast career began in 2006 with a role in the UK television series The Bill, and in the award-winning film Terry Pratchett's Hogfather.

From June 2008 to March 2010, Jackson-Keen played the role of Billy in Billy Elliot the Musical in London. When cast at 12½ years old, he became the 16th boy to play that role. His 23 June 2008 debut marked the first Londoner to play that role.

On 8 March 2010, Jackson-Keen and three other boys from the cast were invited to 10 Downing Street, and met with Prime Minister Gordon Brown, Alistair Darling, Peter Mandelson and Minister for Culture and Tourism Margaret Hodge.

In 2013, he appeared as Roger in the Teatro Kismet touring production of the Philip Pullman novel I Was a Rat! or The Scarlet Slippers, in the United Kingdom.

== Television ==
- The Bill (1 episode, 2006)
- Terry Pratchett's Hogfather (2006) (TV)
- Hyperdrive (1 episode, 2007)
- This Morning (1 episode, 2008)
- What's on Theatre (1 episode, 2008)
- The Alan Titchmarsh Show (1 episode, 2010)
- Doctors (1 episode, 2012)
- My Phone Genie (2012)
- Sadie J (1 episode, 2013)
- Casualty (1 episode, 2014)
- New Tricks (1 episode, 2014)

== Discography ==
=== Extended plays ===
Title	Details
A Sex Demo	Released: TBA; Label: Independent; Format: Digital download, streaming

=== Singles ===
Title	Year	Album
"Behind Closed Doors"	2020	Non-album singles
"Like You in Everyway"	2021	Non-album singles
"This Other Girl"	2021	Non-album singles
"Anything for You" / "Funky Baby"	2022	Non-album singles
"Glimpses"	2023	Non-album singles
"A Sex Demo"	2024	A Sex Demo
