= Connie Talbot's Christmas Album =

Studio album by Connie Talbot
- Released: 24 November 2008
- Recorded: June–August 2008
- Genre: Christmas music
- Label: Rainbow Recording Company
- Producer: Simon Hill; Rob May

Connie Talbot chronology
Over the Rainbow (2007)	Connie Talbot's Christmas Album (2008)	Connie Talbot's Holiday Magic (2009)

Connie Talbot's Christmas Album, sometimes referred to as Connie's Christmas Album or just Christmas Album, is the second album by English child singer Connie Talbot, released on 24 November 2008. The album is made up of Christmas-themed songs, and was recorded in the middle of 2008. Shortly after the release, Pinnacle Entertainment, the United Kingdom distributor, went into administration. Despite this, the album had some success in Asia and the United States, and Talbot's third album, Connie Talbot's Holiday Magic, included many of the same tracks. Talbot appeared publicly to promote the album, including an appearance on ITV Central in December, and embarked on a tour, making stops around the world. Critics responded warmly to the album, describing Talbot's voice as "sweet".

== Recording and release ==
Talbot's voice was recorded near her home. Other parts of the album were recorded elsewhere in the UK, as well as in the US, Bulgaria and Hong Kong. Connie Talbot's Christmas Album contains "a mix of classics and modern Christmas tunes", and was produced by Simon Hill and Rob May, who produced her first album, Over the Rainbow. Big band arrangements on the album included music from Laurence Cottle Big Band, while the orchestral sections of the more traditional songs were performed by the Bulgarian Symphony Orchestra. The duet on "When a Child Is Born" was performed by Talbot and Ginger Kwan. Describing the recording of the album, Talbot said "I really liked it. I liked all the songs they picked and everything. It was really good and enjoyable." Five tracks ("Let it Snow!", "Rockin' Around the Christmas Tree", "Jingle Bell Rock", "Santa Claus Is Coming to Town" and "Frosty the Snowman") were recorded in the style of a big band, while the remainder were recorded in a "more traditional" style.

Connie Talbot's Christmas Album was released on 24 November 2008. The album was difficult to obtain in Britain after the distributor, Pinnacle Entertainment, went into administration. Talbot's mother, Sharon, was quoted as saying, "We don't really know what's going to happen at the moment ... We think they'll probably wait and promote the album later this year. It's a shame, but they can still get the album in Asia and the US." In 2009, Talbot's third album, Connie Talbot's Holiday Magic, was released in the United States, with many of the same songs as Connie Talbot's Christmas Album, but with rerecorded vocals.

== Publicity ==
Before the release of the album, Talbot recorded a "secret concert" at her primary school. The documentary, Christmas with Connie, was shown on ITV Central on 18 December. Talbot appeared at the HMV Walsall branch the day after the release to sign copies of the album and to meet fans. After the release, Talbot embarked on a promotional tour that made stops around the world, including a performance at Ewha Womans University in Korea, where Over the Rainbow had sold over 30,000 copies. Talbot also performed on the A Heart for Children television charity gala in Berlin, Germany. Talbot returned home in mid-December, to have "a quiet family Christmas". Plans were made for a promotional trip to the US in 2009.

== Critical reception and sales ==
Professional ratings
Review scores
Source	Rating
FemaleFirst	(4/5)

Ruth Harrison, writing for FemaleFirst magazine, gave the album 4/5, saying that Talbot has "a great voice when it comes to swing, but lets us down in parts". Harrison said that Talbot struggled with the "rock sound" associated with "Merry Christmas Everybody", but said that the vocals on "Ave Maria" are "incredible", and that the bonus tracks "really are a bonus". The Leicester Mercury published a review from a nine-year-old critic, Natasha Dattani, who said that Talbot "has a nice voice, it's very cute", and added that "older people, like grandparents, will really like" the album. James Whittle, writing for the South China Morning Post, described the album as "chock-a-block with old-time favourites", calling Talbot "sweet-voiced".

Despite the problems in the United Kingdom, which left hundreds of copies of the album in warehouses, Amy Bowen of the Walsall Advertiser wrote that the album was proving successful in Asia. In its first week of release, Connie Talbot's Christmas Album sold 4,551 copies worldwide, and, as of December 2009, it has sold 14,913.

== Track listing ==
This is the main track listing as given by AllMusic. The ordering of both the main and bonus tracks varies between releases, and different releases have different bonus tracks. For example, the Hong Kong release contained only the bonus tracks "Silent Night" and "White Christmas".

No.	Title	Writer(s)	Length
1.	"Let it Snow!"	Sammy Cahn (lyricist) and Jule Styne (composer)	2:33
2.	"When a Child Is Born" (Duet with Ginger Kwan)	Fred Jay (lyricist) and Zacar (composer)	3:09
3.	"Frosty the Snowman"	Jack Rollins and Steve Nelson	2:48
4.	"Merry Christmas Everybody!"	Noddy Holder and Jim Lea	3:31
5.	"Santa Claus Is Coming to Town"	J. Fred Coots and Haven Gillespie	2:59
6.	"Ave Maria"	Vladimir Vavilov	2:49
7.	"Winter Wonderland"	Richard B. Smith (lyricist) and Felix Bernard (composer)	2:38
8.	"Do You Hear What I Hear?"	Noël Regney (lyricist) and Gloria Shayne Baker (composer)	3:22
9.	"Rockin' Around the Christmas Tree"	Johnny Marks	2:36
10.	"O Little Town of Bethlehem"	Phillips Brooks (lyricist) and Lewis Redner (composer)	3:53
11.	"Jingle Bell Rock"	Joe Beal and Jim Boothe	2:47
12.	"I Wish it Could Be Christmas Every Day"	Roy Wood	4:33

=== Bonus tracks ===
No.	Title	Writer(s)	Length
1.	"Walking in the Air"	Howard Blake	3:31
2.	"Silent Night"	Josef Mohr (lyricist – German) and Franz Xaver Gruber (composer)	3:28
3.	"White Christmas"	Irving Berlin	3:16
