= Jake Pratt =

English actor

- Born: 25 September 1996 (age 30); Scarborough, North Yorkshire, England
- Occupation: Actor
- Years active: 2007–present
- Known for: Billy Elliot the Musical, Britain's Got Talent, Green Balloon Club

Jake Stephen Pratt (born 25 September 1996) is an English actor. He entered the public eye when he appeared on the first series of the ITV1 television show Britain's Got Talent in June 2007 where he reached the semi-finals, and lost a place in the grand final. He has since appeared in the British children's television programme, Green Balloon Club, and also worked as a voice-over artist. He starred as Alfie in the BBC comedy film Nativity!, which was released on 27 November 2009.

Pratt's debut in the West End was in Billy Elliot the Musical, where he played the role of Michael from 1 June 2009 to 28 August 2010. A year later, Pratt played the part of Nigel Hicks in the Stratford production of Matilda the Musical, and Tommy in the West End production.

In 2017, Pratt became a voice artist of the various animals in the CBBC mockumentary The Zoo.

== Early life ==
Pratt was born on 25 September 1996 in Scarborough, North Yorkshire, England. He has been attending the Sylvia Young Theatre School since his appearance on Britain's Got Talent. He previously attended YMCA Scarborough, and the Scarborough Dance Centre.

== Career ==
=== Early career ===
Pratt won the Park Resorts National Finals for the 11 & Under Section for three years in a row.

Before Britain's Got Talent, Pratt appeared at BBC Radio York's stand-up comedy event, More Front Than Scarborough, on 11 March 2007. He impressed the judges with his jokes, coming in at second place to Karen Tite.

Pratt has also appeared on The Paul O'Grady Show.

=== 2007: Britain's Got Talent ===
Pratt, at the age of 10, was a contestant on the first series of the ITV television talent show Britain's Got Talent. In his audition, which took place at the Manchester auditions at the Apollo Theatre in March 2007, and was televised on 9 June 2007, he performed a stand-up comedy routine and at the end sang a part of the song "Life is a Cabaret" by Liza Minnelli. His performance received positive comments from all three judges, from Piers Morgan's "You've got brilliant, distinctive comic timing", to Amanda Holden's "You're a real star in the making, real showman, great confidence, you were fantastic", with the exception of Simon Cowell, saying, "I think you're funnier than Peter Kay"; he added that the singing was terrible but the comedy was fantastic. He was placed into the next round, after receiving three yeses from the judges. However, on the day the judges were to choose the 24 semi-finalists for the live semi-finals, on 10 May 2007, at first the judges decided not to put Pratt through. The following day, after two acts were disqualified, the judges decided to put Pratt and a beatboxing group called Crew 82, the two acts they previously rejected, through to the live semi-finals.

In the live semi-final, on 15 June 2007, he performed again a stand-up comedy routine, and sang the chorus of "There's No Business Like Show Business", where this time Cowell buzzed. He told Pratt he should have stuck to telling jokes, so did Holden, who said he should "ditch" the singing at the end, but Morgan decided that he should carry on singing. Cowell asked him why he sang, and he replied "'Cos the producers said I should'". Cowell considered firing the producer, but instead gave him a "done" to finish off. He also said that if he made it to the final, he would improve the singing. He failed to get through to the final and was eliminated from the competition.

=== 2007–present: Post-Talent ===
Pratt has also performed at the fair in Braeburn House, an old people's home in Moor Lane, Eastfield, alongside Bessie Cursons, who reached the final of the talent show, but lost to Paul Potts. Pratt also entered a talent show called Beeon.tv at the end of 2007. He performed a variety of talents – poetry, singing, jokes etc. Pratt appeared on Lori Kellett's fundraising show Lori's One Night Only at the Spa Theatre on 24 June 2007.

Pratt's first major acting role was as nature reporter Jay in the CBeebies television series Green Balloon Club about the environment. Pratt presented segments about birds. The show began in June 2008 and finished in May 2009. Pratt also sang several songs for the show, along with the cast.

In the summer of 2008, Pratt worked on a film called Nativity! alongside Martin Freeman and Ashley Jensen, playing the role of Alfie. It was released on 27 November 2009.

Pratt has also been commended by the Mayor of Scarborough, Janet Jefferson, for his success on Britain's Got Talent. He has also been appearing in cabaret shows organised by his theatre school. He has also opened the mayor of Scarborough's summer fair in 2007, with Sir Jimmy Savile. Money raised went towards local charities.

Pratt also provided the voices of several cartoon characters. He voices one of the main characters in a cartoon based on the Wibbly Pig books by Mick Inkpen on CBeebies where he is the narrator, which started on 7 September 2009. For the cartoon Fun with Claude, broadcast on the channel Playhouse Disney, he provided the voice for grizzly bear Boris. He was also the first voice of Darwin Watterson, from the Cartoon Network show The Amazing World of Gumball. He voiced the character in the 2008 early reel and was replaced in the main series by Kwesi Boakye and Terrell Ransom Jr.

The Scarborough Evening News on 5 June 2009 reported that Pratt had joined the cast of Billy Elliot the Musical. On 1 June 2009 he made his West End debut, taking the role of Billy's best friend, Michael. Pratt did a comic performance for his audition, which got him the role of Michael. He moved into the Billy Elliot house, along with the other youngsters who play the lead roles in the musical.

In 2011, Pratt was cast as Nigel in the Stratford production of Matilda the Musical, and rejoined the West End, where he played Tommy.

Jake attended Hurtwood House, a sixth form college in Surrey, from 2013 – 2015. He starred in several productions including Jesus Christ Superstar, Love & Money and several other showcases. His biggest success however was landing the role of 'Murdered Man' in Hurtwood's Christmas production of Chicago, for which he was awarded the 'Cyrano Award'.

== Personal life ==
Pratt currently lives in Ickenham, London (after previously living in Scarborough) with his mother Joanne, father Steve and sisters Ellie-Jo and Tilly, who also made an appearance on Green Balloon Club on 20 February 2009.

== Filmography ==
Film
Year	Film	Role	Notes
2009	Nativity!	Alfie	
Television
Year	Title	Role	Notes
2007	Britain's Got Talent	Himself	Contestant
2009	Wibbly Pig	Wibbly Pig	Narrator, Voice
2009	Green Balloon Club	Jay	
2009	Fun with Claude	Boris	Voice
2009	The Amazing World of Gumball	Darwin	Voice (Only in the episode 'Early reel')

Stage
Year	Title	Role	Theatre	Notes
1 June 2009 – 28 August 2010	Billy Elliot the Musical	Michael	Victoria Palace Theatre	West End
2011	Matilda the Musical	Nigel	Courtyard Theatre	Original cast
