= Britain's Got Talent series 1 =

Britain's Got Talent
- Series 1
- Hosted by: Ant & Dec (ITV); Stephen Mulhern (ITV2)
- Judges: Piers Morgan; Amanda Holden; Simon Cowell
- Winner: Paul Potts

Release
- Original network: ITV; ITV2 (BGMT)
- Original release: 9 June – 17 June 2007

Series chronology
- Next → Series 2

Judges and Presenter(s) for Britain's Got Talent Series 1

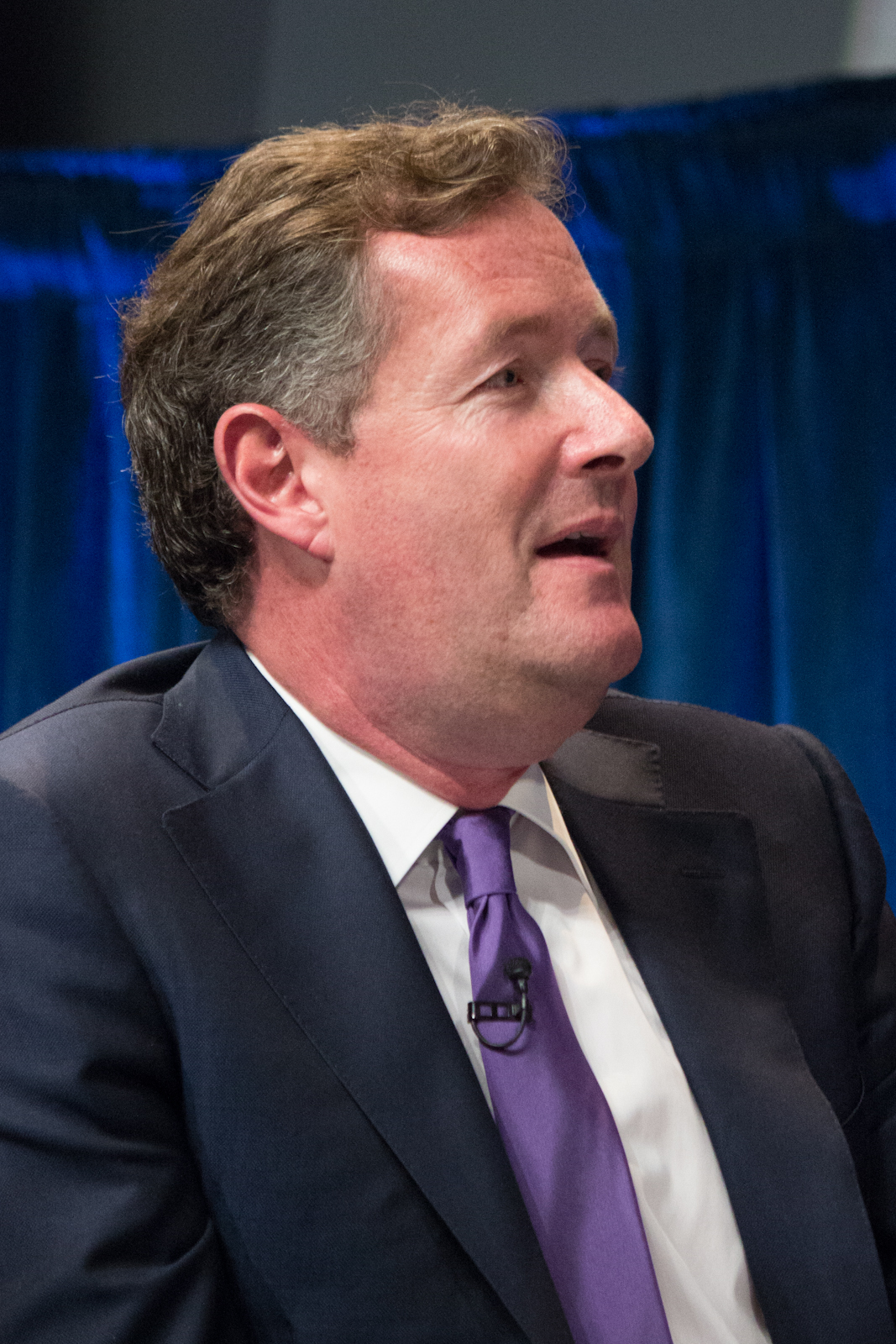
Piers Morgan

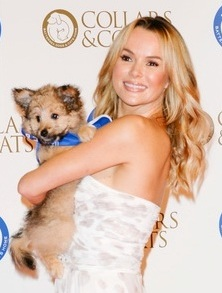
Amanda Holden

Simon Cowell

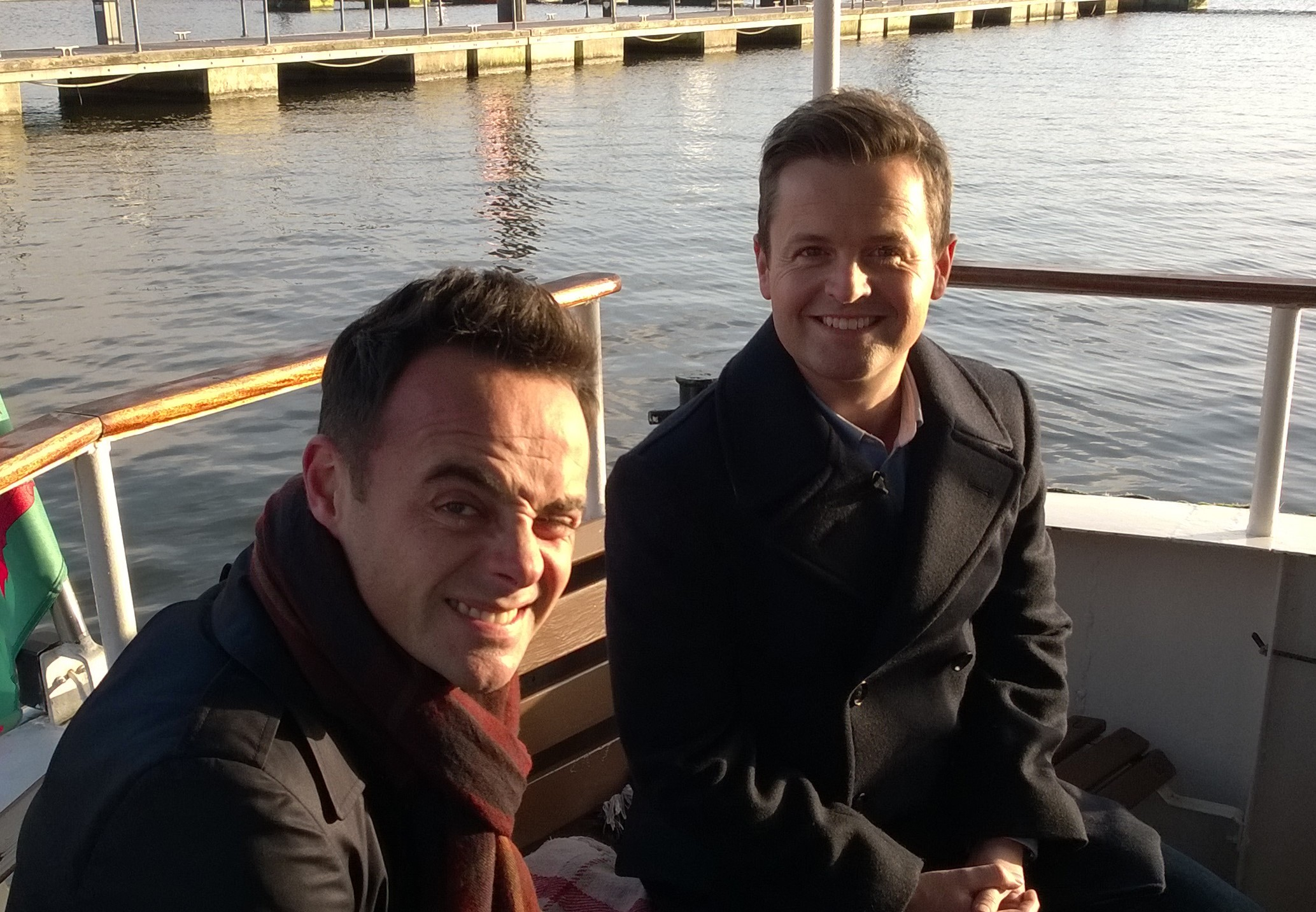
Ant & Dec (ITV1)

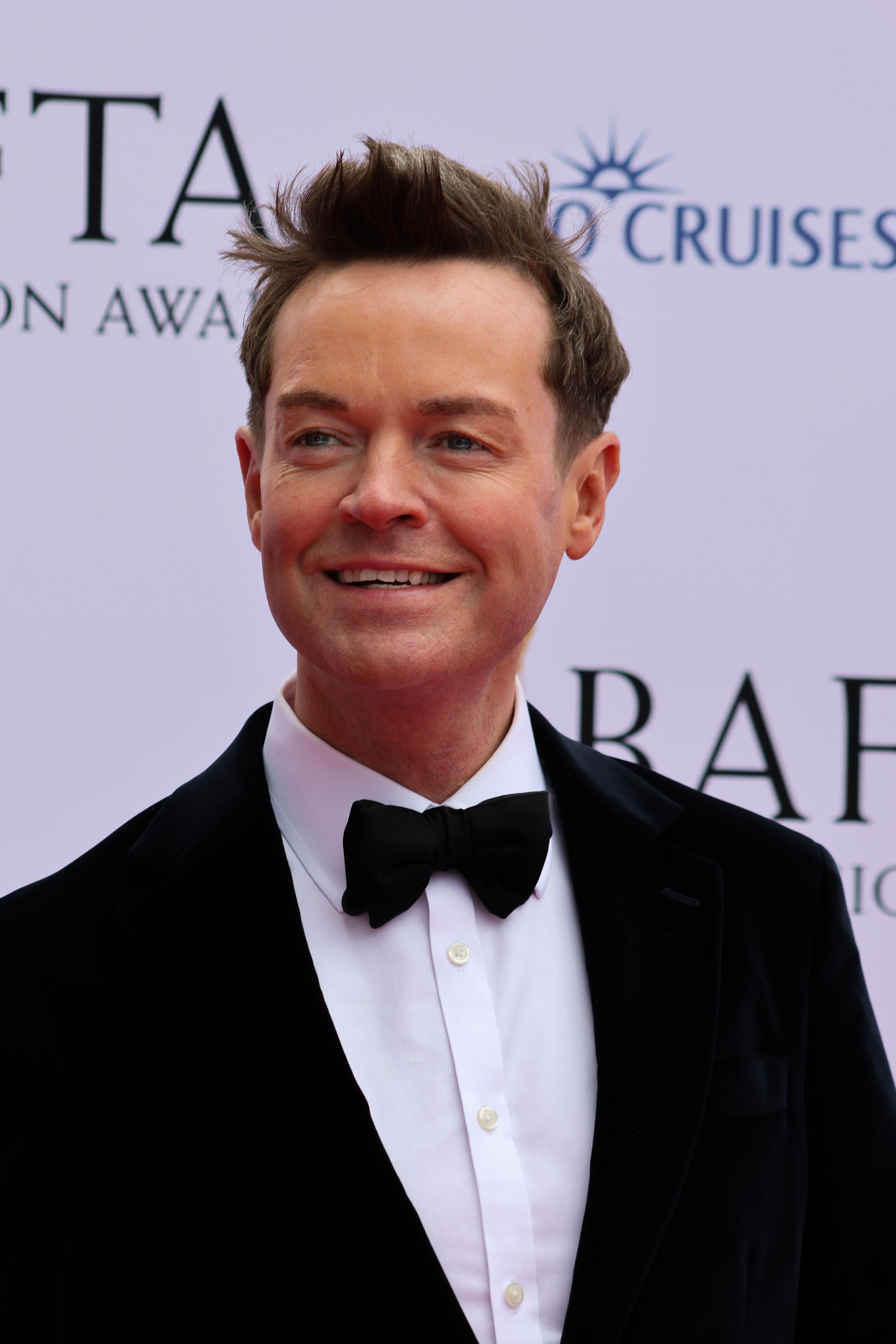
Stephen Mulhern (ITV2)

The first series of British talent competition programme Britain's Got Talent was broadcast on ITV, from 9 to 17 June 2007; it was commissioned following the success of the first season of America's Got Talent, helping to revive production of the British edition after initial development was suspended in 2005. Simon Cowell, the programme's creator, formed the judging panel with both Piers Morgan and Amanda Holden, with Ant & Dec operating as the programme's hosts. Alongside the main programme, the first series was accompanied by a spin-off sister programme on ITV2, titled Britain's Got More Talent, hosted by Stephen Mulhern.

The first series was won by opera singer Paul Potts; as of today, result information on other finalists has yet to be disclosed. During its broadcast, the series averaged around 8.4 million viewers. The first series faced controversy relating to the involvement of two participants who failed to disclose information that would make them ineligible for participation, alongside receiving criticism from viewers for airing footage that was considered unsuitable during one of the semi-finals.

== Series overview ==
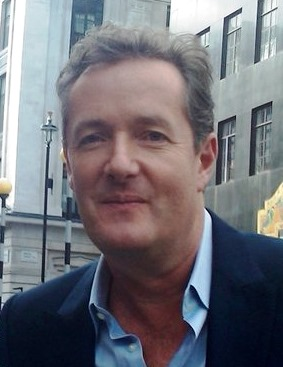
When production on the show resumed, Morgan was brought in as a judge, having been an original choice during the show's initial conception.

After Simon Cowell pitched to ITV his plans for a televised talent competition, production was green-lighted for a full series after a pilot episode was created in mid-2005, with the original panel being Cowell, journalist Piers Morgan and former This Morning presenter, Fern Britton. However, a dispute broke out between Paul O'Grady, the original choice as host for the programme, and the broadcaster, that resulted in O'Grady signing up to another broadcaster. His decision resulted in production being suspended, and did not resume until in the wake of the success of the first series of America's Got Talent. When it did resume, production staff focused on a schedule of ten episodes to begin with for the first series of Britain's Got Talent, with major auditions for potential acts held within the cities of Manchester, Birmingham, London and Cardiff. The initial choices for judges changed to begin with following O'Grady's decision to switch broadcasters, with it eventually finalised on Cowell, Morgan and actress Amanda Holden rather than Britton as originally intended and the hosts being Anthony McPartlin and Declan Donnelly, commonly known as Ant & Dec.

Of the participants who auditioned to be in the contest for this series, only 24 made it into the three live semi-finals, with eight appearing in each one, and six of these acts moving on into the live final. The following below lists the results of each participant's overall performance in this series:

Key: Winner | Runner-Up | Finalist | Semi-finalist

| Participant | Age(s) | Genre | Performance Type | Semi-final | Result |
|---|---|---|---|---|---|
| Bessie Cursons | 11 | Singing | Musical Theatre Performer | 2 | Finalist |
| Caroline Boyes | 48 | Dance | Dancer | 1 | Eliminated |
| Cheeky Bits | 14–29 | Dance | Dance Group | 3 | Eliminated |
| Connie Talbot | 6 | Singing | Singer | 3 | Finalist |
| Craig Womersley | 17 | Variety | Baton Twirler | 2 | Eliminated |
| Crazeehorse | 29–37 | Acrobatics | Acrobatic Duo | 2 | Eliminated |
| Crew 82 | 18–32 | Music | Beatboxing Group | 3 | Eliminated |
| Damon Scott | 27 | Comedy | Ventriloquist | 1 | Finalist |
| Doctor Gore | 30 | Magic | Gore Magician | 3 | Eliminated |
| Dominic Smith | 14 | Singing | Singer | 1 | Eliminated |
| Jack Reeve | 80 | Dance | Tap Dancer | 2 | Eliminated |
| Jake Pratt | 10 | Comedy | Comedian | 2 | Eliminated |
| Kombat Breakers | 13–25 | Dance | Dance Group | 2 | Finalist |
| Luke & Charlotte | 11 & 11 | Dance | Ballroom Dance Duo | 1 | Eliminated |
| MD Productions | 11–28 | Dance | Dance Group | 1 | Eliminated |
| Mel's Klever K9’S | 10–25 | Animals / Dance | Dog Act | 1 | Eliminated |
| Mike Garbutt | 37 | Comedy | Impressionist | 3 | Eliminated |
| Paul Potts | 36 | Singing | Opera Singer | 1 | Winner |
| Scott Holtom | 21 | Dance | Breakdancer | 3 | Eliminated |
| The Bar Wizards | 26—28 | Variety | Juggling Duo | 3 | Finalist |
| The Free Runners | 17–35 | Acrobatics | Free Running Group | 1 | Eliminated |
| The Mini-Mezzos | 8–11 | Dance | Dance Group | 2 | Eliminated |
| Tony Laf | 26 | Singing / Music | Singer & Guitarist | 3 | Eliminated |
| Victoria Armstrong | 29 | Variety | Angle Grinder | 2 | Eliminated |

=== Semi-final summary ===
Buzzed out | Judges' vote | Advanced - Public Vote
Advanced - Judges' Vote | Eliminated - Judges' Vote | Eliminated

==== Semi-final 1 (14 June) ====
| Semi-Finalist | Order | Performance Type | Buzzes and Judges' Vote | | | Result |
| Semi-Finalist | Order | Performance Type | Cowell | Holden | Morgan | Result |
|---|---|---|---|---|---|---|
| MD Productions | 1 | Dance Group | | | | Eliminated |
| Damon Scott | 2 | Puppeteer | | | | Advanced (Won Judges' Vote) |
| Mel's Klever K9’S | 3 | Dog Act | | | | Eliminated |
| Dominic Smith | 4 | Singer | | | | Eliminated (Lost Judges' Vote) |
| Luke & Charlotte | 5 | Ballroom Dance Duo | | | | Eliminated |
| Caroline Boyes | 6 | Dancer | | | | Eliminated |
| The Free Runners | 7 | Free Running Group | | | | Eliminated |
| Paul Potts | 8 | Opera Singer | | | | Advanced (Won Public Vote) |

==== Semi-final 2 (15 June) ====
| Semi-Finalist | Order | Performance Type | Buzzes and Judges' Vote | | | Result |
| Semi-Finalist | Order | Performance Type | Cowell | Holden | Morgan | Result |
|---|---|---|---|---|---|---|
| Kombat Breakers | 1 | Dance Group | | | | Advanced (Won Judges' Vote) |
| Victoria Armstrong | 2 | Angel Grinder | | | | Eliminated |
| Jack Reeve | 3 | Tap Dancer | ^{1} | ^{1} | | Eliminated |
| Jake Pratt | 4 | Stand Up Comedian | | | | Eliminated |
| The Mini-Mezzos | 5 | Dance Group | | | | Eliminated |
| Crazeehorse | 6 | Acrobatic Duo | | | | Eliminated |
| Craig Womersley | 7 | Baton Twirler | | | | Eliminated (Lost Judges' Vote) |
| Bessie Cursons | 8 | Musical Theatre Performer | | | | Advanced (Won Public Vote) |

- ^1 Cowell inexplicably pressed Holden's buzzer, followed by his own, during Jack Reeves' performance. The buzzers were never removed, however Cowell offered no reason as to why he did this, going on to praise the act.

==== Semi-final 3 (16 June) ====
| Semi-Finalist | Order | Performance Type | Buzzes and Judges' Vote | | | Result |
| Semi-Finalist | Order | Performance Type | Cowell | Holden | Morgan | Result |
|---|---|---|---|---|---|---|
| Cheeky Bits | 1 | Dance Group | | | | Eliminated |
| Mike Garbutt | 2 | Impressionist | | | | Eliminated |
| Doctor Gore | 3 | Gore Magician | | | | Eliminated |
| Tony Laf | 4 | Singer & Guitarist | | | | Eliminated (Lost Judges' Vote) |
| Scott Holtom | 5 | Breakdancer | | | | Eliminated |
| Crew 82 | 6 | Beatboxing Group | | | | Eliminated |
| The Bar Wizards | 7 | Cocktail Juggling Duo | | | | Advanced (Won Judges' Vote) |
| Connie Talbot | 8 | Singer | | | | Advanced (Won Public Vote) |

=== Final (17 June) ===
| Finalist | Order | Performance Type | Result |
|---|---|---|---|
| Kombat Breakers | 1 | Dance Group | Finalist |
| Damon Scott | 2 | Puppeteer | Finalist |
| Bessie Cursons | 3 | Musical Theatre Performer | Finalist |
| The Bar Wizards | 4 | Cocktail Juggling Duo | Finalist |
| Connie Talbot | 5 | Singer | Finalist |
| Paul Potts | 6 | Opera Singer | Winner |

== Ratings ==
| Episode | Air date | Total viewers (millions) | ITV1 Weekly rank | Viewer share |
|---|---|---|---|---|
| Auditions 1 | 9 June | 5.20 | 12 | 22.7% |
| Auditions 2 | 10 June | 6.73 | 8 | 28.0% |
| Auditions 3 | 11 June | 7.28 | 15 | 29.4% |
| Auditions 4 | 12 June | 7.39 | 13 | 29.3% |
| Auditions 5 | 13 June | 7.51 | 11 | 29.2% |
| Semi-final 1 | 14 June | 8.36 | 9 | 34.0% |
| Semi-final 2 | 15 June | 9.28 | 8 | 38.1% |
| Semi-final 3 | 16 June | 9.29 | 7 | 40.9% |
| Live final | 17 June | 11.58 | 1 | 43.7% |
| Live final results | 17 June | 11.45 | 2 | 44.7% |

== Criticism & controversies ==
The first series of Britain's Got Talent found itself marred with controversy over two participants - Richard Bates, and Kit Kat Dolls - that auditioned for the competition, after they were found to have breached rules that required personal details and information that was not "untruthful, inaccurate or misleading". Bates was removed at the request of Lancashire Police, after they revealed that he had not disclosed being on the UK's Violent and Sex Offender Register at the time of filming for an offence he had committed in 2005, while the Kit Kat Dolls were disqualified after three of their members were discovered to be secretly working as prostitutes during an undercover investigation by the News of the World.

When the live rounds took place, viewers criticised the programme for the involvement of magician Doctor Gore. Their complaints focused on the nature of his performance and their presentation, which they deemed as unsuitable for a family-orientated programme that would be watched by young children. Production staff claimed in their defence that the performance was thoroughly reviewed before it was broadcast, but the investigation of regulator Ofcom ruled against Britain's Got Talent for breaching its broadcasting code with regards to protecting young children from unsuitable material.
