= Jordan Jansen =

Australian singer

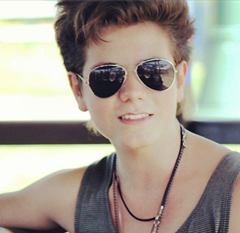

Background information
- Born: 12 March 1998 (age 28); Gold Coast, Queensland, Australia
- Genres: Pop, Rock, R&B
- Occupation: Singer
- Instruments: Vocals, guitar, piano
- Years active: 2005–present
- Label: Kite Records

Jordan Jansen (born 12 March 1998) is an Australian pop singer from Gold Coast, Queensland. As of 2020, he works full-time as a healthcare worker in neurosurgery, specifically as a biomedical technician.

In May 2010, Hollywoodlife.com called Jansen "the latest pride and joy of Australia", following his appearances on Australia's Got Talent and sudden rise to popularity online.

Jansen has been called "the new Bieber" and has more than three-quarters of a million followers on Twitter and a fan club of devotees who call themselves "Jordaneers".

As of March 2018, his music video of the Leonard Cohen song "Hallelujah" has over 4.9 million views on YouTube. As of March 2018, his YouTube channel as a whole has accumulated over 37 million views.

In 2011, Jansen was signed by American record label Kite Records (Toby Gad) and Australian label Sony Music Australia, with David Sonenberg as his manager. In late 2014, they parted ways and Jansen announced his upcoming EP to be released in the fall of 2015.

On 31 May 2016, his EP Invincible was released worldwide.
