= Green Balloon Club =

British children's television series

- Genre: Children's
- Created by: Clare Bradley
- Developed by: Gary Stevenson
- Starring: Jake Pratt; Isabella Blake-Thomas; Debbie Korley; Adam Wells; Thai Murray-Edwards; Aliex Yuill; Chris Howard; Bill Oddie
- Narrated by: Gary Martin
- Theme music composer: Paul Mossel
- Country of origin: United Kingdom
- Original language: English
- No. of seasons: 2
- No. of episodes: 63

Production
- Executive producer: Graham Lawson
- Producer: Clare Bradley
- Production locations: Capital Group Studios; Gruffalo Studios
- Camera setup: Tony Bragg; Derek Gruszeckyi
- Running time: 20 minutes
- Production company: BBC Children's Production

Original release
- Network: CBeebies
- Release: 20 June 2008 – 29 May 2009

Related
- Springwatch/Autumnwatch

Green Balloon Club is a British children's factual television program that started on CBeebies on 20 June 2008.

== Format ==
Green Balloon Club focuses on the adventures of four children - Jay, Cat, Lilly-Rose and Ant, as they travel throughout the United Kingdom on a green hot-air balloon led by balloonist Skye and Cat's dog Skipper. During their travels, they look out for other Green Balloon Club members and have a look at what wildlife they have in their patch. Each episode starts with the children doing the register, then joining in with the "Green Balloon Club" chant. At the end of the show, the balloon "lands" and everybody sings one of several songs.

Other BBC personalities appear on the show, with the puppet Jelly from The Story Makers and Springwatch appearing as a special reporter, and fellow BBC presenters Chris Howard and Bill Oddie.

== Cast ==
=== Green Team/Main ===
The cast members on the show were all ordinary children all found at extensive auditions:

- Debbie Korley as Sky, the balloonist of the Green Team who leads the group on various adventures. She was replaced with Chris Howard near the end of the series' main run, and in the Green Balloon Club Goes on Holiday spin-off, but later returned in the Winter Special.
- Isabella Blake-Thomas as Lily Rose, the flower expert of the Green Team. She is the youngest of the children (her actress was only five at the time of the production), and sometimes can be a bit self-centred.
- Jake Pratt as Jay, the bird expert of the Green Team. He can be quite a jokester at times. He did not appear in one episode, and did not appear for the Green Balloon Club Goes on Holiday spin-off, but later returned for the Winter Special.
- Adam Wells as Ant, the bug expert of the Green Team and the only member who is not southern.
- Thai Murray-Edwards as Cat, the animal expert of the Green Team and the owner of Skipper.
- Skipper the Dog as herself, the canine companion of the Green Team. Skipper's dog actress was the real-life pet of the actress for Cat, Thai Murray-Edwards. Skipper's sounds are done through stock sound effects.

=== Recurring ===
- Aliex Yuill as Jelly, a green puppet who is one of the Story Makers. She normally appears in episodes as a Special Reporter (reprising this role from Springwatch and Autumnwatch) or is with Bill Oddie in his garden.
- Chris Howard, a presenter from Springwatch and Autumnwatch, he normally appears with other children as the leader of the Ground Crew, but near the end of the show's run became the pilot of the balloon going by the name "Nature Chris", replacing Debbie Korley.
- Bill Oddie, another BBC nature presenter, he appears in some episodes alongside Jelly, where they look at the different kinds of nature around his garden.

== Songs ==
The series also has a major focus on music and singing, and every episode features an originally-written song performed by the main cast. All of the songs were written by Paul Moessl.

- Theme Song
- Let's Go Play Outside
- It's Our World
- Listen
- All Earth's Creatures
- Underwater
- Fun on the Beach
- Minibeast Madness
- Flying
- Whatever's Good at Christmas (written by Bill Oddie and produced by Paul Moessl, was released as a single)
- Dig In
- Good to get away (Arran song)
- At the Zoo (Belfast song)
- Animal Alphabet
- Waggle Dance
- It's a Dog's Life
- and a final special arrangement of the title song for the Winter Special

== Development ==
The program was conceived and made by Clare Bradley, Lotte Elwell and the CBeebies production team, and grew out of their previous award-winning work on Springwatch and Autumnwatch.

== Episodes ==
=== Green Balloon Club (2008–2009) ===
Green Balloon Club was produced as part of CBeebies' "EcoBeebies" brand. It started with a launch show named Easy Peasy Eco Beebies on 13 June 2008, and this was followed by 48 episodes, one every week from 20 June 2008 to 29 May 2009, although there was a break during the Christmas Holidays.

Titles were sourced from the BBC Australia website (the episodes on the UK BBC website don't have episode titles).

No. overall	No. in season	Title	Original release date
1	1	"Episode 1" "Easy Peasy Green"	20 June 2008
The Green Balloon Club themselves are introduced. Song: Let's Go and Play Outside
2	2	"Episode 2" "Animals Under the Waters"	27 June 2008
The team finds out about animals under the water. Song: All Earth's Creatures
3	3	"Episode 3" "Dragonflies"	4 July 2008
The team travels over the Scottish Highlands to find out what wildlife lives there, which includes the likes of the various fruits and dragonflies.
4	4	"Episode 4" "Bugs Hunt"	11 July 2008
The gang is going on a bug hunt, while Jelly is visiting the Isles of Scilly. Song: Dig In (reruns)
5	5	"Episode 5" "Lily-Rose Plants Nasturtiums"	18 July 2008
Lily-Rose plants some nasturtiums, while the rest of the team finds out about night-time creatures.
6	6	"Episode 6" "The Team Go to the Coast"	25 July 2008
The team goes to the coast of the UK and finds out about the wildlife that lives there.
7	7	"Episode 7"	1 August 2008
Ant brings a giant spider as a special visitor to the club. Note: This episode was skipped over in Australia due to the episode's focus being on spiders, as Australia is home to some of the most deadliest spiders. Because of this, it has no official title.
8	8	"Episode 8" "Heathland"	8 August 2008
The team is on the lookout for wildlife in the Heathlands.
9	9	"Episode 9" "Busy Bee Boogie"	15 August 2008
Lily Rose and her gang discover a forest of flowers. Lily Rose does her Busy Bee Dance, while Jelly visits Bill Oddie to find a shell for Lily Rose.
10	10	"Episode 10" "Under the Sea"	22 August 2008
The team explores near the sea and is fascinated by the different sea creatures.
11	11	"Episode 11" "Sweet Lavender"	29 August 2008
The team discovers how sweet lavender is.
12	12	"Episode 12" "All the Senses"	5 September 2008
The Green Team uses all their senses to explore the world around them. Song: On the Beach
13	13	"Episode 13" "Building a Nest"	12 September 2008
Jay and Ant show the viewers how tricky it is to build a nest.
14	14	"Episode 14" "Life on the Waterways"	19 September 2008
The Green Team are finding out about life on the waterways. Song: Let's Go and Play Outside
15	15	"Episode 15" "Mud Festival in Wales"	26 September 2008
The balloon is heading to a mud festival in Wales and the green team are having much messy fun with compost and clay. Song: Dig In (reruns)
16	16	"Episode 16" "Canal Boat"	3 October 2008
Jelly goes on a trip on a canal boat and looks at the wildlife along the banks along with several other Club Members. Song: Underwater
17	17	"Episode 17" "Basil the Cat"	10 October 2008
The Green Team has a special visitor with them in the balloon. Basil the kitten has come to the Green Balloon with Cat, and the team looks at how he is like his larger African cousins. Song: All Earth's Creatures
18	18	"Episode 18" "Apples"	17 October 2008
Jelly is harvesting apples in an orchard while Lily-Rose and Ant are starting a planting experiment to see if they can grow an apple tree. Song: Listen
19	19	"Episode 19" "Animals and the Seashore"	24 October 2008
The Green Team finds out about owls and what wildlife can be found on the seashore at this time of year. Song: Flying
20	20	"Episode 20" "Halloween"	31 October 2008
It is Halloween and there are some spooky goings-on in the Green Balloon, including bats and a Tower of Flour. Song: Minibeast Madness
21	21	"Episode 21" "Birds in Autumn"	7 November 2008
As part of the Autumnwatch season, the Green Team are having a good look at Autumn – how the leaves change colour and whether it is possible to preserve their lovely shades. Song: Flying
22	22	"Episode 22" "Wild About Woods"	14 November 2008
The Green Team are going wild about woods. Song: Listen
23	23	"Episode 23" "Hibernating Birds"	21 November 2008
The Green Team are learning about hibernation and Jay is finding out if birds hibernate. Song: Flying
24	24	"Episode 24" "Jumping Salmon"	28 November 2008
The Green Team marvel at just how athletic some creatures are. The balloon is visited by a very athletic little friend: Georgina the ferret. Song: All Earth's Creatures
25	25	"Episode 25" "Mini Christmas Trees"	5 December 2008
The Green Team is starting to think about Christmas. They have an idea for making mini Christmas trees. Song: Whatever's Good at Christmas
26	26	"Episode 26" "Christmas Tree"	12 December 2008
Christmas is getting near and Sky has bought a Christmas tree for the Green Balloon. Song: Whatever's Good at Christmas
27	27	"Episode 27" "The Story of Christmas"	19 December 2008
Christmas is almost here and the Green Team is thinking about presents. Along the way, they find out the true meaning of the holiday, alongside an adaptation of the nativity told through animals. Song: Whatever's Good at Christmas Note: There was a two-week break between this episode and the next, due to the cast going on Christmas holidays.
28	28	"Episode 28" "New Year Special"	9 January 2009
The Green Team is all together again and full of wishes for the New Year. Song: It's Our World Note: Jake Pratt, who plays Jay, was absent for this episode. In the show itself, it was said that Jay had the flu.
29	29	"Episode 29" "Lily-Rose Hates Winter"	16 January 2009
It is January and Lily-Rose is feeling fed up with the Winter. Her flowers have died and there is no wildlife around to spot. The Green Team set about showing her that there is still plenty to do and see in the winter.
30	30	"Episode 30" "Birds in Winter"	23 January 2009
The Green Balloon Club has a good look at the birds in the winter garden. Cat and Lily-Rose are making comical dancing birds, and there is a close look at stoats, who are also great movers. Song: Flying
31	31	"Episode 31" "Pantomime"	30 January 2009
The Green Team reimagines the story of Little Red Riding Hood with Lily-Rose playing the lead, and not one, not two, but three wolves. Song: Listen
32	32	"Episode 32" "Making Bread"	6 February 2009
The Green Team learns how bread is made. Song: All Earth's Creatures
33	33	"Episode 33" "Blue Tits"	13 February 2009
The first signs of Spring are starting to appear and birds are looking for places to build their nests and start a family. Jay is putting up a new home for his robins and a family of blue tits is introduced in this episode. Song: Minibeast Madness
34	34	"Episode 34" "Lily-Rose's Tooth"	20 February 2009
Lily-Rose has lost her first tooth and she brings it in to show the Green Team. Ant in turn shows her his collection of animal teeth and they look at what jobs the different kinds of teeth do. Song: Flying
35	35	"Episode 35" "Weather with Nature Chris"	27 February 2009
Nature Chris joins the Green Team, who are having a weather day. Song: On the Beach
36	36	"Episode 36" "Skipper's Birthday"	6 March 2009
The Green Team wonders when Skipper's birthday is, which Cat doesn't know about. They decide that it would not be more difficult to have Skipper's birthday than in the present. Song: Let's Go and Play Outside
37	37	"Episode 37" "Creatures Communicate"	13 March 2009
The Green Team is finding out about creatures that communicate using vibrations. They decide to create a communication system of their own. Song: Underwater
38	38	"Episode 38" "Ladybirds in Spring"	20 March 2009
Spring is on the way. Ant has found his first ladybird of the year, and it looks like it is coming out of hibernation. Song: It's Our World
39	39	"Episode 39" "The Lifecycle"	27 March 2009
The Green Team finds out about the life cycles of animals. Ant has brought in some pupae that he is watching, hoping that they will soon hatch into butterflies. Song: Minibeast Madness
40	40	"Episode 40" "Animal Tracks"	3 April 2009
The Green Team is going tracking, also finding out that every creature makes a different print.
41	41	"Episode 41" "City Farm and Baby Rabbits"	10 April 2009
A pair of baby rabbits visit the Green Balloon. Jelly and her friends set off to a city farm to discover what baby animals they have there, and at the same time get involved with some pig racing.
42	42	"Episode 42" "Dig In"	17 April 2009
The Green Team joins in with the BBC's Dig In Campaign. Song: Dig In
43	43	"Episode 43" "Toy Farm and Baby Animals"	24 April 2009
Cat brings in a toy farm to the Club. Along the way, the Green Team finds out about baby farm animals.
44	44	"Episode 44" "Bluebells"	1 May 2009
The Green Team is amazed by just how fast things can grow.
45	45	"Episode 45" "Stag Beetles"	8 May 2009
Ant brings in his prize model of a stag beetle and the team finds out about Britain's biggest insect, which is under threat.
46	46	"Episode 46" "Animals That Live in Dens"	15 May 2009
The Green Team builds a fantastic den inside the Green Balloon, thinking about the animals that live in dens and under the ground.
47	47	"Episode 47" "Ocean in a Box"	22 May 2009
The Green Team make their own nature worlds, including an amazing Ocean-in-a-Box by Cat and Ant.
48	48	"Episode 48" "Four Seasons"	29 May 2009
The Green Team thinks about the four seasons and tries to decide which is best. Song: Let's Go and Play Outside

==== Ratings ====
Episode viewing figures from BARB.

Episode no.	Airdate	Total viewers	CBeebies weekly ranking
1	20 June 2008	342,000	7
2	27 June 2008	352,000	2
3	4 July 2008	290,000	4
4	11 July 2008	338,000	9
5	18 July 2008	504,000	1
6	25 July 2008	Under 294,000	Outside Top 10
7	1 August 2008	383,000	1
8	8 August 2008	Under 319,000	Outside Top 10
9	15 August 2008	Under 302,000	Outside Top 10
10	22 August 2008	Under 311,000	Outside Top 10
11	29 August 2008	Under 312,000	Outside Top 10
12	5 September 2008	Under 329,000	Outside Top 10
13	12 September 2008	Under 389,000	Outside Top 10
14	19 September 2008	Under 332,000	Outside Top 10
15	26 September 2008	Under 368,000	Outside Top 10
16	3 October 2008	Under 350,000	Outside Top 10
17	10 October 2008	Under 347,000	Outside Top 10
18	17 October 2008	Under 361,000	Outside Top 10
19	24 October 2008	Under 380,000	Outside Top 10
20	31 October 2008	Under 345,000	Outside Top 10
21	7 November 2008	Under 336,000	Outside Top 10
22	14 November 2008	Under 331,000	Outside Top 10
23	21 November 2008	Under 364,000	Outside Top 10
24	28 November 2008	Under 331,000	Outside Top 10
25	5 December 2008	Under 338,000	Outside Top 10
26	12 December 2008	Under 324,000	Outside Top 10
27	19 December 2008	Under 401,000	Outside Top 10
28	9 January 2009	Under 415,000	Outside Top 10
29	16 January 2009		
30	23 January 2009		
31	30 January 2009		
32	6 February 2009		
33	13 February 2009		
34	20 February 2009		

=== Green Balloon Club Goes on Holiday (2009) ===
In 2009, a stand-alone series of 10 episodes was broadcast. The first half featured the Green Team visiting the Isle of Arran and the second half featured the Green Team becoming zookeepers at the Belfast Zoo for a week.

=== Winter Special (2009) ===
A stand-alone Winter Special aired in December 2009, featuring the entire cast on a winter camping adventure. This special is officially part of the Green Balloon Club Scrapbook production order, and listed as Episode 13.

=== Green Balloon Club Scrapbook (2010) ===
In 2010, a spin-off series of 15 episodes entitled "Green Balloon Club Scrapbook" was produced, which showed "what the Green Team get up to when they're not in the Green Balloon. Different members of the team check the laptop to find out what the other members of the Green Balloon Club are getting up to". This series also included animated segments starring Skipper the Dog, who, in this series, gained a voice. This series also included two song specials.

Episode	Original air date	Details	Total viewers
1	13 January 2010	Skipper heads off on an adventure where she meets a monkey gang from South Africa.	278,000
2	20 January 2010	Skipper heads off on an adventure with a parrot party in the South American rainforest.	300,000
3	27 January 2010	Jelly is on a camping trip with some friends in Wales.	230,000
4	3 February 2010	Skipper heads off to the jungle where she meets a bird who can make the most amazing sounds.	268,000
5	10 February 2010	Ant is making his Bug Files at his local Tropical House.	249,000
6	17 February 2010	Jelly reports from the Welsh coast where she meets a surfing family.	236,000
7	24 February 2010	Skipper is off on an African adventure, where she meets a lot of water-loving hippos.	204,000
8	3 March 2010	Skipper heads underwater where she encounters a giant octopus.	193,000
9	10 March 2010	Skipper heads off to Antarctica where she goes for a long and cold walk with a group of penguins.	191,000
10	17 March 2010	Skipper heads off to South America on a multi-coloured Macaw adventure.	105,000
11	24 March 2010	Ant and his friend Bradley meet some big hissing cockroaches and have a race with them.	164,000
12	29 March 2010	Jay is out doing some birdwatching, he's looking at how autumn is a good time for birds.	
13	23 December 2009	Winter Special: Lily Rose and the Green Balloon Club fly off to a winter camping trip - in yurts!	213,000
14	30 March 2010	Song Special part 1: The Green Team introduces their favourite songs in a special programme of music and verse.	203,000
15	31 March 2010	Song Special part 2: Ant is out looking for minibeasts.	350,000

Note: Episode 13 was not shown between episodes 12 and 14, as it was shown within the Christmas schedule.

== International airings ==
- The show began airing in Australia on their version of CBeebies in late 2009, in time for the summer season. Until 2019, the show still aired on the channel, in a late-night slot.
- The show also aired on CBeebies Poland from 2010 to 2013, titled Podróże z Zielonym Balonem ("Travel with the Green Balloon") and dubbed into Polish by now-defunct dubbing company Eurocom Studio.
