= Karen Tite =

Karen Tite (born 28 November 1966 in Scarborough, North Yorkshire, England) is an English actress based in Newcastle upon Tyne

She was formerly a member of the now-disbanded Purple Monkey Theatre Company, and was involved with the Valley Theatre Company also based in Scarborough.

== Awards ==
In March 2007 Karen won the top prize at BBC Radio York's "More Front Than Scarborough" event for Comic Relief 2007, with a performance as Blodwyn Pigg.

In 2006 she won the Saltburn Drama Festival's adjudicator's award for her role in A Ticket For Graceland. More recently she has worked in conjunction with the RSC and it's "Romeo and Juliet remix" at the Sage Gateshead. Entertained a crowd of would be standups at the Dog and Parrot pub Newcastle. Was a lead actress in degree work at Newcastle college. she is now a member of The Peoples Theatre Newcastle and appeared in " They Shoot Horses Don't They"
