= Bar Wizards =

British flair bartending act

The Bar Wizards (Neil Lowrey and Neil Garner) are a British flair bartending act. They first rose to fame when they were finalists in the first series of the British television talent show Britain's Got Talent in 2007, in which they lost to the eventual winner, singer Paul Potts. The Bar Wizards started off as bartenders but now perform their Tandem Flair Show worldwide, and bartend at private parties.

== Background ==
The Bar Wizards are from Manchester. Garner originally worked as a bartender in Stockport and Lowrey in Blackley. They met while competing in flare bartending competitions and teamed up as a double act. Bar Wizards International came into being in early 2005, as a result of a partnership between Lowrey and Garner. The pair already had ten years' experience in the bar industry and had worked in over fifty countries. This led them to make a show which they believed would allow them to work as performers and entertainers.

=== Tandem Flair Show ===
The main performance of the Bar Wizards is their Tandem Flair show which they created. They then promoted their new show around the United Kingdom, and soon found interest in the corporate market as an after dinner show, allowing them the opportunity to develop the routine, and hone their tandem skills, whilst experimenting with new moves, music and themes. This culminated in a performance at the 2006 Roadhouse World Finals in Covent Garden, London.

The act uses a variety of different tricks and music including Queen's "Don't Stop Me Now", "I Believe in a Thing Called Love" by The Darkness, and "Freedom" by Aretha Franklin.

Their act includes flipping, spinning, throwing, catching, shaking and pouring their way through a routine using bottles, tins, glasses, and bar equipment.

== Britain's Got Talent ==
The Bar Wizards were one of the finalists in the show and one of just two acts in the final featuring more than one person, with the other being Kombat Breakers. The Bar Wizards act consisted of flair bartending, juggling and throwing glass bottles and cocktail tins, all choreographed to music. At the finale of their act they rainbow poured drinks (up to six at one time) in Red, White and Blue to match their "British Theme".

The Bar Wizards responded to criticism that their act was not varied enough to perform at the Royal Variety Performance by adding new elements, such as hitting each other over the head with sugar bottles. Overall judges comments were positive with judge Piers Morgan describing them as "highly amusing".

== Other work ==
The Bar Wizards have also appeared on GMTV, as well as being the mystery guests on an episode of A Question of Sport on BBC One and have appeared on The Paul O'Grady Show. They were extras in the film Basic Instinct 2 and have appeared on China Central Television, Channel M television station based in Manchester and Britain's Next Top Model.

They have made a number of guest appearances such as the opening of a new café bar at the Scarborough campus of the University of Hull.

The Bar Wizards were part of Hellmann's Mayonnaise squeezy campaign in a television commercial and web campaign "Squeezy Skills" where they displayed other uses for their flair skills by making sandwiches using flair bartending. The Bar Wizards continue to event bartend, have also developed a mobile cocktail bar service.

They also run Flair and Mixology training courses, where they train flair bartenders.

As a reward for winning the task, on the first episode of the fifth series of the BBC One show The Apprentice the boys' team was treated to a cocktail made by 'The Bar Wizards'.

They were featured on Guinness World Records Smashed, where they set a new World Record

They went into business together in 2009, opening their own bar/restaurant in Littleborough, Rochdale, called "The Barwizards Lounge".
