= Paradise Lost (Agents of S.H.I.E.L.D.) =

- Agents of S.H.I.E.L.D. episode
- Episode no.: Season 3 Episode 16
- Directed by: Wendey Stanzler
- Written by: George Kitson; Sharla Oliver
- Cinematography by: Allan Westbrook
- Editing by: Joshua Charson
- Original air date: April 12, 2016
- Running time: 43 minutes

Guest appearances
- Powers Boothe as Gideon Malick; Bethany Joy Lenz as Stephanie Malick; Reed Diamond as Daniel Whitehall; Mark Dacascos as Giyera; Cameron Palatas as young Gideon Malick; Joel Dabney Courtney as Nathaniel Malick; Axle Whitehead as James

Episode chronology
← Previous "Spacetime"	Next → "The Team"
- Agents of S.H.I.E.L.D. season 3

"Paradise Lost" is the sixteenth episode of the third season of the American television series Agents of S.H.I.E.L.D. Based on the Marvel Comics organization S.H.I.E.L.D., it follows Phil Coulson and his team of S.H.I.E.L.D. agents as they learn of their new enemy, Hive. It is set in the Marvel Cinematic Universe (MCU) and acknowledges the franchise's films. The episode was written by George Kitson and Sharla Oliver, and directed by Wendey Stanzler.

Clark Gregg reprises his role as Coulson from the film series, and is joined by series regulars Ming-Na Wen, Brett Dalton, Chloe Bennet, Iain De Caestecker, Elizabeth Henstridge, Henry Simmons, and Luke Mitchell.

"Paradise Lost" originally aired on ABC on April 12, 2016, and according to Nielsen Media Research, was watched by 3.01 million viewers.

== Plot ==
In 1970, a teenage Gideon Malick and his younger brother Nathaniel inherit their father, Wilfred's estate following his death, and become the leaders of the religious branch of Hydra, who periodically select one of their number to be sent to Maveth through the Monolith, as a sacrifice to the ancient Inhuman. The brothers reluctantly visit an imprisoned Daniel Whitehall, who is dismissive of their belief in the Inhuman, believing it to be mythical. He reveals that Wilfred used sleight of hand to ensure he would never be chosen as a sacrifice, leaving both brothers upset at both his deception and cowardice. They're disappointed to discover that he was not the man they thought he was and vow to each other to become better men than he was. Malick, however, later uses the same trick to avoid being sent to Maveth, ensuring Nathaniel is sent instead, who's horrified at his brother's betrayal.

In the present, realizing that the Inhuman from Maveth is possessing Grant Ward's body, Leo Fitz and Jemma Simmons determine that the Transia board members were eaten alive by a microscopic insectoid swarm, deducing that the Inhuman is made up of an amalgam of these alien organisms. Phil Coulson is left disillusioned that he may have unleashed a far worse threat by killing Ward. Hydra seize control of an agricultural company related to Transia, who are studying means of inoculating animals and plants against invasive organisms, leading Simmons to theorize that their studies could be used against the Inhuman. While the rest of the team go there to investigate, Lincoln Campbell takes Daisy Johnson to South Dakota in search of James, an Australian mercenary and inactive Inhuman who was banished from Afterlife for stealing a Kree artifact and information about the ancient Inhuman from their archives. In exchange for a Terrigen crystal, James reveals that the creature, "Alveus" (Latin for "Hive"), was one of the first Inhumans, who led his kin in a revolution against the Kree, driving them from Earth. Some of the other Inhumans became fearful of Hive, and united with humankind against him, ultimately banishing him to Maveth. Lincoln grabs the spherical artifact but double-crosses James, refusing to relinquish the promised crystal, believing he does not deserve Terrigenesis. James is outraged and warns Daisy that Lincoln is not to be trusted. Due to what James let slip, Lincoln is forced to confess to Daisy that he once drunkenly caused a car crash that nearly killed his previous girlfriend, prior to coming to Afterlife. In return, Daisy tells Lincoln about her vision of a S.H.I.E.L.D. agent's death in space, possibly her own or someone on the team. (Note: A vision Daisy had in "Bouncing Back".)

A terrified Malick confides in a disbelieving Stephanie Malick that he will soon be killed by Hive, according to the vision Charles Hinton showed him. Hive visits the Malicks' home to arrange a meeting of Hydra's inner circle, revealing himself to them as proof he is indeed the one he professes to be, he morphs into his true tentacled form, leaving them all agape. He also tells Stephanie of her father's betrayal of Nathaniel, whose memories and persona he still retains. A distraught Stephanie, disappointed she's been lied to all these years, tells Hive to punish Malick however he sees fit, and as Malick watches, Hive kisses Stephanie, unleashing his parasites into her body and killing her from the inside. "Now you understand sacrifice", Hive tells a shock-stricken Malick. Meanwhile, Giyera is captured at the agricultural company, after Melinda May defeats him in a fight. However he later breaks free of containment and telekinetically flies the plane to Malick's headquarters in the Netherlands, with Coulson, May, Fitz, Simmons and Alphonso "Mack" Mackenzie trapped on board. In response, Daisy and Lincoln decide to bring in Joey Gutierrez and Elena Rodriguez for a rescue mission.

In an end tag, Hive informs a grief-stricken and mutinous Malick of the S.H.I.E.L.D. team's capture, and assures him that he has nothing further to fear, as Nathaniel has been avenged to Hive's satisfaction. He places a hand on Malick's shoulder, and in Nathaniel's voice utters, "Together, till the end."

== Production ==
=== Development ===
In March 2016, Marvel announced that the sixteenth episode of the season would be titled "Paradise Lost", to be written by George Kitson and Sharla Oliver, with Wendey Stanzler directing.

=== Writing ===
After the previous episode, executive producers Jed Whedon and Maurissa Tancharoen discussed how the title characters would be affected by the reveal that Hive was walking around in the body of Grant Ward, going into this episode, with Whedon saying, "This is going to be the most shocking for Coulson because he did something dark but for a good reason, and now he knows he didn't achieve much. Maybe he even did something or created something worse with that act. I think that Coulson's real feelings about Ward will come to the surface. For everybody else, obviously it's going to be a very large threat." Tancharoen added, "Up until this point, Coulson has been coping with what he did to Ward back on Maveth by just pushing forward, not really thinking about it. Now, basically Ward's face filled the screen in his office and he literally came face-to-face with the person that he killed. And he's no longer a person, so what is he is still a question. We've been alluding to the fact that he's the ultimate symbol of evil, so that's not good."

Bethany Joy Lenz was briefly introduced as Stephanie Malick in "Parting Shot", ahead of her larger role in this episode, on which Tancharoen explained, "We definitely wanted to explore what it's like to be a family that grew up in the religion of Hydra, if you will. How that is the backbone of their beliefs and their bond. It's a very interesting dynamic, this father-and-daughter relationship in that world of Hydra." On the character kissing Hive moments before her death, Whedon said, "Is it creepy that she's basically kissing her uncle? Yes. But she's caught up. This is the most powerful thing that she's been taught to worship her whole life that's paying attention to her. If she took a step back, maybe she would think a little harder about it. But in the moment, she's just enthralled."

=== Casting ===
In March 2016, Marvel revealed that main cast members Clark Gregg, Ming-Na Wen, Brett Dalton, Chloe Bennet, Iain De Caestecker, Elizabeth Henstridge, Nick Blood, Adrianne Palicki, Henry Simmons, and Luke Mitchell would star as Phil Coulson, Melinda May, Hive, Daisy Johnson, Leo Fitz, Jemma Simmons, Lance Hunter, Bobbi Morse, Alphonso "Mack" Mackenzie, and Lincoln Campbell, respectively. It was also revealed that the guest cast for the episode would include Reed Diamond as Daniel Whitehall, Powers Boothe as Gideon Malick, Mark Dacascos as Giyera, Cameron Palatas as young Gideon Malick, Alexander Wraith as Agent Anderson, Joel Dabney Courtney as Nathaniel Malick, Axle Whitehead as James, Mark Atteberry as Kurt Vogel, Ana Zimhart as S.H.I.E.L.D. agent, Henry LeBlanc as mourner and Bethany Joy Lenz as Stephanie Malick. Wraith, Atteberry, Zimhart, and Leblanc did not receive guest star credit in the episode. Diamond, Boothe, Dacascos, Wraith, and Lenz reprise their roles from earlier in the series. Blood and Palicki do not ultimately appear.

== Broadcast ==
"Paradise Lost" was first aired in the United States on ABC on April 12, 2016.

== Reception ==
=== Ratings ===
In the United States the episode received a 1.0/3 percent share among adults between the ages of 18 and 49, meaning that it was seen by 1.0 percent of all households, and 3 percent of all of those watching television at the time of the broadcast. It was watched by 3.01 million viewers.
