= Spacetime (Agents of S.H.I.E.L.D.) =

- Agents of S.H.I.E.L.D. episode
- Episode no.: Season 3 Episode 15
- Directed by: Kevin Tancharoen
- Written by: Jed Whedon; Maurissa Tancharoen
- Cinematography by: Feliks Parnell
- Editing by: Eric Litman
- Original air date: April 5, 2016
- Running time: 43 minutes

Guest appearances
- Powers Boothe as Gideon Malick; Matthew Willig as Lash; Mark Dacascos as Giyera; Bjørn Johnson as Charles Hinton; Wolfgang Bodison as Edwin Abbott; Lola Glaudini as Polly Hinton; Markus Flanagan as Rowan Hamilton; Blair Underwood as Andrew Garner

Episode chronology
← Previous "Watchdogs"	Next → "Paradise Lost"
- Agents of S.H.I.E.L.D. season 3

"Spacetime" is the fifteenth episode of the third season of the American television series Agents of S.H.I.E.L.D. Based on the Marvel Comics organization S.H.I.E.L.D., it follows Phil Coulson and his team of S.H.I.E.L.D. agents as they race to prevent a vision of the future from playing out. It is set in the Marvel Cinematic Universe (MCU) and acknowledges the franchise's films. The episode was written by Maurissa Tancharoen and Jed Whedon, and directed by Kevin Tancharoen.

Clark Gregg reprises his role as Coulson from the film series, and is joined by series regulars Ming-Na Wen, Brett Dalton, Chloe Bennet, Iain De Caestecker, Elizabeth Henstridge, Henry Simmons, and Luke Mitchell.

"Spacetime" originally aired on ABC on April 5, 2016, and according to Nielsen Media Research, was watched by 2.81 million viewers.

== Plot ==
In New York City, Edwin Abbot is given a vision of his impending death by a homeless Inhuman, Charles Hinton, and calls the police, with his call being intercepted by S.H.I.E.L.D. when he mentions Daisy Johnson, who he saw in his vision. Phil Coulson, Melinda May, Daisy and Lincoln Campbell meet with Abbot just as Hydra attacks, killing Abbot and abducting Hinton. When Daisy grabs Hinton's hand while trying to save him, she is shown visions of the future in which she unsuccessfully attempts to rescue Hinton, who is killed. Despite Leo Fitz's insistence that the future is fixed and Daisy's conviction that she must save Hinton, Coulson decides to instead send May.

Daisy speaks to Hinton's ex-wife, Polly, who tells her how Hinton's powers destroyed their family because every time he touched her or their daughter Robin, they would witness a death that would happen soon after. Polly cries, which Daisy saw in her visions, realizing that they are starting to come true.

Accompanied by Gideon Malick, Giyera and Hinton, the ancient Inhuman visits the Transia Corporation, massacres the board members, and retrieves a mechanized exoskeleton developed by the company. Having promised Malick the "true power" he craves, the Inhuman convinces him to put on the exoskeleton, enhancing his strength. Just as S.H.I.E.L.D. find out about the attack on Transia and May prepares for the mission, Andrew Garner arrives and surrenders, explaining he is about to transform into Lash permanently. Coulson convinces May to stay with Andrew and try to cure him with Jemma Simmons' previously-untested vaccine, which proves ineffective. After they say goodbye to one another, May watches Andrew transform, after which he no longer recognize her.

Meanwhile, Daisy goes to Transia alone, but after Fitz hacks into the facility's CCTV and finds footage of "Ward", Coulson and Lincoln follow Daisy inside. They are unsuccessful in their attempts to find the Inhuman, who escapes with Giyera, while Daisy pursues the fleeing Hydra agents to the roof in a bid to rescue Hinton, only to be attacked by Malick. Hinton saves Daisy by giving Malick a vision, whereupon he fatally wounds Hinton and flees. As Hinton dies with Daisy lying badly injured beside him, he shows her another vision, of a S.H.I.E.L.D. agent dying aboard an exploding spaceship.

In an end tag, a fleeing Malick calls Giyera to remind him "you work for me", but Giyera tells him that his place is beside The Ancient Inhuman. He tells the Inhuman that, for the first time, Malick seems afraid.

== Production ==
=== Development ===
In March 2016, Marvel announced that the fifteenth episode of the season would be titled "Spacetime", to be written by executive producers Maurissa Tancharoen and Jed Whedon, with Kevin Tancharoen directing.

=== Writing ===
Discussing Daisy Johnson's ultimate inability to change the future, Maurissa Tancharoen said, "In this episode, Daisy believes her destiny is to alter this future but it's right on the heels of us building this arc with Daisy where she has this hubris. She has this sense of Inhuman pride. The fact that she thinks she can stop the future is an example of that pride. When we build something up in a character, we like to take it away, and this is an example of that." When asked about the final scene between Melinda May and Andrew Garner, and whether Garner is truly gone for good, Whedon replied, "I think so. It's a goodbye between Andrew and May, and it's a powerful one. They were both so wonderful in those scenes....I think right now, it is goodbye to Andrew and hello to perma-Lash."

=== Casting ===
In March 2016, Marvel revealed that main cast members Clark Gregg, Ming-Na Wen, Brett Dalton, Chloe Bennet, Iain De Caestecker, Elizabeth Henstridge, Nick Blood, Adrianne Palicki, Henry Simmons, and Luke Mitchell would star as Phil Coulson, Melinda May, Grant Ward, Daisy Johnson, Leo Fitz, Jemma Simmons, Lance Hunter, Bobbi Morse, Alphonso "Mack" Mackenzie, and Lincoln Campbell, respectively. It was also revealed that the guest cast for the episode would include Blair Underwood as Andrew Garner, Matthew Willig as Lash, Powers Boothe as Gideon Malick, Mark Dacascos as Giyera, Alexander Wraith as Agent Anderson, Bjørn Johnson as Charles Hinton, Wolfgang Bodison as Edwin Abbott, Lola Glaudini as Polly Hinton, Markus Flanagan as Rowan Hamilton, Scott Broderick as officer, Matt Ferrucci as S.H.I.E.L.D. agent and Andrew Thacher as Rowan lawyer #1. Wraith, Broderick, Ferrucci, and Thacher did not receive guest star credit in the episode. Underwood, Willig, Boothe, and Dacascos reprise their roles from earlier in the series. Blood, Palicki, and Simmons did not ultimately appear.

=== Filming ===
Following the success of a single-shot fight sequence in the Kevin Tancharoen-directed second season episode "The Dirty Half Dozen", Maurissa Tancharoen and Whedon wrote a similar single-take sequence into the script of "Spacetime". Kevin compared this sequence to the previous one by saying, "I don't think any one of these versions is going to be better or worse than the other. They're just going to be different. This particular one was in a smaller room, so it was a little bit more complicated." The sequence, which took "three or four hours of sprints and sprints and sprints" to get right, not only accommodated the actors and camera crew in the small, "intimate" room, but the producers and showrunners as well, as they wished to "witness the action scene unfold."

Kevin Tancharoen noted that "on shows like Daredevil or The Flash or Arrow or any of these other superhero shows, they have a mask on and a hood or something that can cover their face. On S.H.I.E.L.D., they don't have that, and it's full out. You have to make sure that the person who is acting the part is actually physically doing it. I give all my props to Chloe [Bennet] for making that work." On why the series' story needed the sequence, Tancharoen stated, "There has been such an arc from [Daisy] being a computer hacker to a supreme badass. To see her expertly take out every single opponent, and not hide it by cutting and editing, I think speaks volumes about how far Skye/Daisy has come as a character."

== Broadcast ==
"Spacetime" was first aired in the United States on ABC on April 5, 2016.

== Reception ==
=== Ratings ===
In the United States the episode received a 0.9/3 percent share among adults between the ages of 18 and 49, meaning that it was seen by 0.9 percent of all households, and 3 percent of all of those watching television at the time of the broadcast. It was watched by 2.81 million viewers.

=== Accolades ===
In June 2016, IGN ranked the episode as the eighth best in the series.
