= Watchdogs (Agents of S.H.I.E.L.D.) =

- Agents of S.H.I.E.L.D. episode
- Episode no.: Season 3 Episode 14
- Directed by: Jesse Bochco
- Written by: Drew Z. Greenberg
- Cinematography by: Allan Westbrook
- Editing by: Kelly Stuyvesant
- Original air date: March 29, 2016
- Running time: 42 minutes

Guest appearances
- Titus Welliver as Felix Blake; Mark Dacascos as Giyera; Gaius Charles as Ruben Mackenzie

Episode chronology
← Previous "Parting Shot"	Next → "Spacetime"
- Agents of S.H.I.E.L.D. season 3

"Watchdogs" is the fourteenth episode of the third season of the American television series Agents of S.H.I.E.L.D. Based on the Marvel Comics organization S.H.I.E.L.D., it follows Phil Coulson and his team of S.H.I.E.L.D. agents as they face the Watchdogs, an anti-Inhuman terrorist group. It is set in the Marvel Cinematic Universe (MCU) and acknowledges the franchise's films. The episode was written by Drew Z. Greenberg, and directed by Jesse Bochco.

Clark Gregg reprises his role as Coulson from the film series, and is joined by series regulars Ming-Na Wen, Chloe Bennet, Iain De Caestecker, Elizabeth Henstridge, Henry Simmons, and Luke Mitchell.

"Watchdogs" originally aired on ABC on March 29, 2016, and according to Nielsen Media Research, was watched by 3.20 million viewers.

== Plot ==
The Watchdogs, a militant terrorist organization dedicated to eradicating the Inhumans, destroy an Indiana Advanced Threat Containment Unit (ATCU) facility using nitramene in gel projectiles. Alphonso "Mack" Mackenzie, who is in the area visiting his brother Ruben, reluctantly leaves and joins Daisy Johnson and Leo Fitz to investigate, and they inform Coulson of the use of nitramene, leading him to suspect the Watchdogs are being led by former S.H.I.E.L.D. agent Felix Blake, who tried to improve nitramene weaponry in the past. Mack gets into an argument with Ruben, who is unaware that Mack is a S.H.I.E.L.D. agent and resents him for barely being present in his life and for helping care for their elderly parents. Ruben was recently made redundant and is struggling financially, blaming the government for his problems and sympathising with the Watchdogs.

Trying to track down Andrew Garner, Melinda May enlists Jemma Simmons, who suggests that as Andrew is becoming more animalistic, he is running on base instincts and not his usual desires. She also advises against May's intended plan to kill Andrew, believing they can still devise a cure for Terrigenesis before he becomes Lash permanently. Tracing the Watchdogs' online activity, Daisy and Fitz track down one of their non-radical members and coerce him into revealing the location of the Watchdogs' local headquarters, at a farm. Daisy, Fitz and Mack spy on the farm, but Ruben arrives, intending to apologize to Mack, and blows their cover, forcing the agents to defend him from Watchdogs. In the ensuing fight Fitz is shot with a nitramene gel projectile, but Daisy stops the implosion by freezing the gel with liquid nitrogen.

Following Ruben home, Mack admits he works for S.H.I.E.L.D.. They are attacked by five Watchdogs, who saw Daisy's powers in use at the farm but believed Mack to be the Inhuman. The brothers work together to defend themselves, killing or wounding their attackers. Meanwhile, Coulson and Lincoln Campbell search one of Blake's old safe houses and find him there. Blake exposes his hatred of Inhumans and his belief that S.H.I.E.L.D. will always use dangerous alien elements to spread terror, and Lincoln reluctantly tries to kill him with Coulson's permission, only to find "Blake" is a hologram. The team later learn that the Watchdogs were directed to the ATCU facility by Gideon Malick, and destroyed the building to cover up the theft of a nuclear weapon, which Blake (a paraplegic after being attacked by Mike Peterson (Note: As depicted in "End of the Beginning".)) delivers to Giyera in exchange for more powerful weapons.

== Production ==
=== Development ===
In March 2016, Marvel announced that the fourteenth episode of the season would be titled "Watchdogs", to be written by Drew Z. Greenberg, with Jesse Bochco directing.

=== Casting ===
In March 2016, Marvel revealed that main cast members Clark Gregg, Ming-Na Wen, Brett Dalton, Chloe Bennet, Iain De Caestecker, Elizabeth Henstridge, Nick Blood, Adrianne Palicki, Henry Simmons, and Luke Mitchell would star as Phil Coulson, Melinda May, Hive, Daisy Johnson, Leo Fitz, Jemma Simmons, Lance Hunter, Bobbi Morse, Alphonso "Mack" Mackenzie, and Lincoln Campbell, respectively. It was also revealed that the guest cast for the episode would include Titus Welliver as Felix Blake, Mark Dacascos as Giyera, Gaius Charles as Ruben Mackenzie, Trenton Rostedt as Dallas Wyatt, Justin Morck as Watchdog Alpha, Jonathan Camp as Watchdog Oscar and D. Elliot Woods as Watchdog Victor. Rostedt, Morck, Camp, and Woods did not receive guest star credit in the episode. Welliver and Dacascos reprise their roles from earlier in the series. Dalton, Blood, and Palicki did not ultimately appear.

=== Marvel Cinematic Universe tie-ins ===
The episode connects the series to several other MCU television shows: by featuring the chemical compound nitramene, which was developed by Howard Stark and seen in the Agent Carter episodes "Now is Not the End" and "Bridge and Tunnel"; by noting a gang war in Hell's Kitchen, Manhattan, as seen in the second season of Daredevil; and by referencing the company Damage Control, which was the focus of a potential MCU television series of the same name and later seen in Spider-Man: Homecoming.

== Release ==
=== Broadcast ===
"Watchdogs" was first aired in the United States on ABC on March 29, 2016.

=== Marketing ===
On March 26, 2016, the episode was screened at WonderCon.

== Reception ==
=== Ratings ===
In the United States the episode received a 1.0/3 percent share among adults between the ages of 18 and 49, meaning that it was seen by 1.0 percent of all households, and 3 percent of all of those watching television at the time of the broadcast. It was watched by 3.20 million viewers.
