= Agents of S.H.I.E.L.D. season 3 =

Agents of S.H.I.E.L.D.
- Season 3
- Promotional poster and home media cover art
- Showrunners: Jed Whedon; Maurissa Tancharoen; Jeffrey Bell
- Starring: Clark Gregg; Ming-Na Wen; Brett Dalton; Chloe Bennet; Iain De Caestecker; Elizabeth Henstridge; Nick Blood; Adrianne Palicki; Henry Simmons; Luke Mitchell
- No. of episodes: 22

Release
- Original network: ABC
- Original release: September 29, 2015 – May 17, 2016

Season chronology
- ← Previous; Season 2 Next → Season 4

The third season of the American television series Agents of S.H.I.E.L.D., based on the Marvel Comics organization S.H.I.E.L.D., follows Phil Coulson and his team of S.H.I.E.L.D. agents and Inhumans as they face new threats to the world. It is set in the Marvel Cinematic Universe (MCU) and acknowledges the continuity of the franchise's films. The season was produced by ABC Studios, Marvel Television, and Mutant Enemy Productions, with Jed Whedon, Maurissa Tancharoen, and Jeffrey Bell serving as showrunners.

Clark Gregg reprises his role as Coulson from the film series, starring alongside the returning series regulars Ming-Na Wen, Brett Dalton, Chloe Bennet, Iain De Caestecker, Elizabeth Henstridge, Nick Blood, Adrianne Palicki. They are joined by Henry Simmons and Luke Mitchell who were promoted from recurring guest roles in the second season. The third season was ordered in May 2015, and filmed from that July to the following April. It takes inspiration from the Secret Warriors comic by Jonathan Hickman and Brian Michael Bendis, combining it with the series' Inhuman and Hydra storylines, while paralleling the film Captain America: Civil War (2016); connections to other MCU television series are also included in the season, as are characters from previous MCU media. Glenn Hetrick created prosthetics for the less-human looking Inhumans, Legacy Effects provided additional practical effects, and FuseFX returned to create the visual effects.

The first episode of the season premiered in Los Angeles on September 23, 2015, with the season, consisting of 22 episodes, airing on ABC from September 29, 2015, until May 17, 2016. The premiere was watched by 4.90 million viewers, higher than any episode of the entire second half of season two. Overall, the season had generally consistent ratings, and received positive reviews. Critics felt the series had "hit its stride" with the season, and particularly praised the risky bottle episode "4,722 Hours", though the pacing of the season received criticism for trying to do too much at times. The series was renewed for a fourth season in March 2016.

== Episodes ==
No. overall	No. in season	Title	Directed by	Written by	Original release date	U.S. viewers (millions)
45	1	"Laws of Nature"	Vincent Misiano	Jed Whedon & Maurissa Tancharoen	September 29, 2015	4.90
After developing metal-bending abilities, Joey Gutierrez is saved from the hostile Advanced Threat Containment Unit (ATCU)—President Matthew Ellis' replacement for the underground S.H.I.E.L.D.—by S.H.I.E.L.D. agents. When Agent Daisy Johnson struggles to explain to Gutierrez their Inhuman heritage, activated by exposure to the recently released compound Terrigen, she seeks the help of Lincoln Campbell, who taught her but now wants to live a normal life. S.H.I.E.L.D. Director Phil Coulson finds the leader of the ATCU, Rosalind Price, and the two realize that there is a third party interested in new Inhumans: the monstrous Inhuman Lash, who attacks Daisy and Lincoln. The subsequent arrival of the ATCU causes both Lash and Lincoln to flee; the organization begins hunting them. Agent Leo Fitz acquires an ancient Hebrew scroll describing the Kree Monolith—that consumed his partner Jemma Simmons—as "Death" (Hebrew: מות), which Fitz is unable to accept. Simmons, meanwhile, is on a desolate alien planet.
46	2	"Purpose in the Machine"	Kevin Tancharoen	DJ Doyle	October 6, 2015	4.32
Dr. Andrew Garner evaluates Gutierrez and deems him not yet ready to join the Secret Warriors, Daisy's potential team of Inhumans. Grant Ward, looking to rebuild Hydra, recruits Werner von Strucker, son of previous leader Baron Wolfgang von Strucker. Tasked with hunting down and killing Ward, Agent Lance Hunter tracks down Garner's ex-wife Agent Melinda May, who has been on leave from S.H.I.E.L.D. for six months. May is convinced not to run from her life, despite difficulties in her relationships with Garner and Coulson, and eventually agrees to join Hunter in his mission. Fitz realizes that the Monolith is a portal and S.H.I.E.L.D. enlists Asgardian Elliot Randolph. Randolph takes them to an old English castle, where a now-deteriorated machine was constructed to open the Monolith using vibrations. Daisy is able to replicate this effect with her abilities and Fitz sends a flare through before entering the portal himself. He finds Simmons and is able to bring her back just as Daisy's power destroys the Monolith.
47	3	"A Wanted (Inhu)man"	Garry A. Brown	Monica Owusu-Breen	October 13, 2015	3.74
The ATCU closes in on Lincoln, who is betrayed by an old friend when the ATCU asks for public help in capturing the "alien". He calls Daisy for help. Coulson meets with Price, asking her to let S.H.I.E.L.D. take Lincoln instead, but realizes that they know of Daisy, too, and that, to keep her safe, he must let the ATCU take Lincoln. Unaware of this, Daisy finds Lincoln, but is followed by the ATCU. Lincoln attacks them and escapes, so they try to take Daisy instead. To save her, Coulson agrees to work with Price to capture the Inhumans together. Hunter and May meet with a contact Hunter has in Hydra who takes them to the new initiation system: Hunter must fight to the death to prove himself worthy of Hydra. Hunter fights his contact, kills him, and is accepted into Hydra's ranks. Fitz attempts to help Simmons reacclimate to her old life, but she is struggling with both the physics of Earth and mental trauma. Later, Agent Bobbi Morse finds Simmons wanting to reopen the portal and return to the planet.
48	4	"Devils You Know"	Ron Underwood	Paul Zbyszewski	October 20, 2015	3.85
Daisy discovers an encoded email at the scene of a Lash attack and traces it to Dwight Frye, an Inhuman who is negatively affected by the presence of other Inhumans that Lash has been using to find targets. May visits S.H.I.E.L.D. to warn Coulson that Hunter's mission is becoming too personal and reckless, but refuses to talk to Garner, who left her while they were trying to rekindle their relationship. The ATCU takes Frye, with Daisy and Agent Alphonso Mackenzie allowed to go with them to see their base and Inhuman facilities. However, Lash ambushes their van, kills Frye, and injures Mack, but spares Daisy, who witnesses him transforming into an ordinary human afterward. Hunter is brought on a mission with Hydra, but is seen by Ward and attacks him. May arrives to help, but Ward reveals Strucker is prepared to kill Garner unless Hunter and May allow him to escape. May, unable to sacrifice Garner, is willing to back off, but Hunter attacks Ward, shooting him in the shoulder as he flees. In retaliation, Strucker seemingly kills Garner.
49	5	"4,722 Hours"	Jesse Bochco	Craig Titley	October 27, 2015	3.81
Simmons agrees to tell Fitz of her six months on the planet. After being dragged through the portal, she found herself on an apparently sun-less, deserted planet, where she came across a pool of water and an alien life form inhabiting it, allowing her to sustain herself until she met stranded astronaut Will Daniels. Daniels had traveled through the portal with a team of scientists in 2001, when the monolith was in NASA's possession, but, over time, they had been driven mad by the planet and an evil entity upon it, each eventually dying. Simmons realized that the opening of the portal could be predicted by studying the stars and alignment of the planet's moons and, over months, they were able to anticipate the next opening of the portal. When they missed it, Simmons lost hope, but found solace with Daniels and fell in love with him. When they saw Fitz's flare, Simmons was able to make it to him while Daniels distracted the entity. Now, Simmons wants to reopen the portal so they can return to save Daniels, something with which Fitz agrees to help.
50	6	"Among Us Hide..."	Dwight Little	Drew Z. Greenberg	November 3, 2015	3.84
S.H.I.E.L.D. finds Garner alive after Strucker flees the scene. Hunter is replaced by Morse on the Ward mission; she and May begin tracking Strucker. Since Daisy and Mack never made it to the ATCU facility, Coulson visits it himself, while Daisy, Mack, and Hunter believe that Price's right-hand man, Luther Banks, may be Lash. They find Banks, knock him out, take some of his blood, and sneak a camera into the facility to which he was headed. As analysis proves that Banks is not an Inhuman, they realize that they are at the ATCU facility and witness Coulson seeing a captured Inhuman arrive in suspended animation. Price tells Coulson that she wants to 'cure' the Inhumans because she could not help her husband, who died of cancer. May and Morse trace Strucker to the apartment of Gideon Malick, with whom Strucker sought sanctuary. Malick, instead, turned him over to Hydra in exchange for a future favor. As Morse fights off the Hydra members, Strucker tells May that Garner survived his attack because Garner is Lash.
51	7	"Chaos Theory"	David Solomon	Lauren LeFranc	November 10, 2015	3.49
May confronts Garner, who explains that, while researching for S.H.I.E.L.D., he opened a ledger of known Inhumans belonging to Daisy's late mother which was booby trapped to release Terrigen on its reader. Inhuman abilities within Garner were unlocked and, when Garner was subsequently drawn to an 'unworthy' Inhuman, transformed into Lash, and killed him, Garner broke things off with May. Coulson joins Price for a meeting with the President about the outbreak of enhanced people, but is interrupted en route by Lincoln, who has deduced that Lash must have access to the ledger. S.H.I.E.L.D. and the ATCU track down Garner and May, the latter being held hostage, and Coulson tries to talk down Garner. Garner's Lash instincts want him to kill Lincoln and, after the latter attacks Lash, only May is able to calm him down and return him to his human form. Lincoln warns that the Lash form will soon be permanent, so May has the ATCU put Garner in stasis until their cure is complete. Coulson then spends the night with Price.
52	8	"Many Heads, One Tale"	Garry A. Brown	DJ Doyle & Jed Whedon	November 17, 2015	3.60
Malick knows that Ward wants access to one of von Strucker's vaults—said to contain the true power of Hydra, which he wishes to use to kill Coulson—so he sends men to kill Ward. Ward defeats them and tortures the vault's location from them. Hunter and Morse enter the ATCU, disguised as FBI agents investigating a security breach triggered by Garner's containment module. Morse discovers that the ATCU is keeping the Inhumans offsite and is trying to make more instead of curing them. Coulson confronts Price, but she was unaware of this because her long-time business partner, Malick, had been running that side. Ward breaks into the vault and is confronted by an impressed Malick. As Fitz and Simmons realize that Daniels was sent through the portal by Hydra as a sacrifice to the entity, Malick explains to Ward that it is an ancient Inhuman, Hive (from Latin: Alveus), who was banished through the portal. If Ward helps Hydra return it to Earth, their original founding purpose, then Malick will help Ward take down S.H.I.E.L.D.
53	9	"Closure"	Kate Woods	Brent Fletcher	December 1, 2015	3.84
At dinner with Coulson, Price reveals plans to confront Malick, before being abruptly sniped by Ward and dying in Coulson's arms. Promoting Mack to interim director of S.H.I.E.L.D., Coulson sets out for revenge and goes off-book with Hunter and Morse to kidnap Ward's younger brother, Thomas. Fitz and Simmons go with Banks to investigate the ATCU, but Banks is killed and the other two are captured by Hydra. Simmons is tortured until Fitz agrees to help Hydra return Hive to Earth, while Coulson uses a phone call between the Ward brothers, where Grant attempts to justify himself and his past actions to Thomas, to locate Hydra: they have set up base at the English castle. Mack clears Gutierrez and Lincoln for field duty and mobilizes the rest of S.H.I.E.L.D. for a rescue mission. Hydra reopens the portal and Malick convinces Ward to lead Hydra through it with Fitz and return with Hive, promising that Coulson will die when they return. Determined to kill Ward, Coulson manages to enter the portal as well.
54	10	"Maveth"	Vincent Misiano	Jeffrey Bell	December 8, 2015	3.85
Fitz finds Daniels and convinces Ward that they will need him to find the exit point. Mack sends May and the Secret Warriors (Daisy, Lincoln, and Gutierrez) to find Simmons while he, Morse, and Hunter infiltrate the castle and secure the portal room. Simmons escapes herself after Lincoln shuts down Hydra's power, and discovers several Inhumans that Malick has gathered as an army, including Garner. Simmons agrees to unleash Lash on Hydra before making her way to the others. Fitz and Daniels lead Ward to the ruins of an ancient civilization where they manage to get away, while Coulson catches up to Ward and overpowers him, forcing him to follow them. At the exit, Daniels attacks Fitz; Hive killed Daniels as Simmons escaped and now inhabits his body. Ward attacks Coulson when he is distracted by Fitz, but Coulson uses his prosthetic hand to kill Ward while Fitz uses a flare to destroy Daniels' body. Fitz and Coulson return to Earth, but Hive secretly does as well, now inhabiting Ward's body.
55	11	"Bouncing Back"	Ron Underwood	Monica Owusu-Breen	March 8, 2016	3.52
S.H.I.E.L.D. agents arrive in Bogotá to investigate an Inhuman who stole weapons from the police. The woman, Elena Rodriguez, is apprehended despite her super speed (with the limitation of returning to where she began moving from after one heartbeat) and reveals that she was destroying the weapons to prevent their misuse by corrupt police officers. Coulson uses the machine that restored his memories on Strucker—who is in a vegetative state following brutal treatment by Malick's men—and discovers where he contacted Malick. Coulson uses the phone there to find many of Malick's facilities, which are promptly shut down by Malick. The police kidnap Morse and Hunter using their own Inhuman, Lucio, who can temporarily petrify anyone using eye contact. Rodriguez aids S.H.I.E.L.D. in rescuing the pair and, though Lucio is captured by Hydra, Rodriguez agrees to join the Secret Warriors; she remains in Colombia, on call. Ellis informs Coulson that the new head of the ATCU will be Glenn Talbot, who will report directly to Coulson.
56	12	"The Inside Man"	John Terlesky	Craig Titley	March 15, 2016	2.94
Talbot and Coulson meet with delegates from several countries to discuss Inhumans, accompanied by Carl Creel—a human who survived terrigenesis thanks to Hydra experimentation and whose blood Simmons believes could be used to "cure" Inhumans who have not yet transitioned. Coulson suspects that one of the delegates is an inside man for Malick and sends Hunter, Morse, and May to find out who it is. Hunter, seeing Creel acting suspiciously, discovers Talbot's son in ATCU stasis. They also discover that the Australian government has captured an Inhuman, Eden Fesi, for experimentation. Talbot turns on Coulson when Malick arrives, the latter convincing the delegates that Coulson is Hydra and that they should carry out their plans—the building of an Inhuman sanctuary—with Malick instead. May saves Talbot's son, allowing him to leave with Coulson without fear for his family. Hunter and Morse follow Malick to Russia, S.H.I.E.L.D. agents rescue Fesi, and Hive restores Ward's corpse to full strength by sacrificing several humans.
57	13	"Parting Shot"	Michael Zinberg	Paul Zbyszewski	March 22, 2016	2.88
Hunter and Morse follow Malick to a decommissioned facility in Siberia, where Russian delegate Anton Petrov wishes to build a sanctuary against the wishes of Russian Prime Minister Dimitri Olshenko. Olshenko sends his attaché to shut down the operation, but he is murdered by General Androvich, an opposition minister and Inhuman whose shadow is made of sentient darkforce. Malick suggests that the Prime Minister be invited to the facility himself and that Androvich be unleashed upon him. Hunter kills Petrov to protect Olshenko, while Morse kills Androvich to destroy his shadow. Olshenko, unaware of the attempt on his life, has the two arrested. Their Interpol interrogator threatens to turn them over to the Russians for execution unless they confirm that S.H.I.E.L.D. still exists, but Morse and Hunter refuse. Ellis intervenes with Coulson; they save the pair's lives on the condition that they never work for the U.S. government again. With the option of working in secret out of the field, Morse and Hunter instead choose to leave S.H.I.E.L.D.
58	14	"Watchdogs"	Jesse Bochco	Drew Z. Greenberg	March 29, 2016	3.20
Mack, struggling with the departures of Morse and Hunter, takes time off to be with his brother Ruben. When an online hate group called the Watchdogs uses Howard Stark-developed nitramene bombs to perform a terrorist attack on an ATCU facility, Coulson suspects that former S.H.I.E.L.D. agent Felix Blake—who had been committed to the advancement of nitramene technology and has been missing since having his back broken by Deathlok (Note: As depicted in "End of the Beginning".)—has taken over the group. Ruben becomes disillusioned with Mack when he leaves to investigate a Watchdog base and accidentally reveals his S.H.I.E.L.D. agent status, but Mack is able to improve their relationship when he fends off a group of the terrorists that attack the brothers. Coulson takes Lincoln to search Blake's known safehouses and the two are confronted by Blake via hologram at one; he reveals that Hydra is backing him and the Watchdogs in their crusade to kill all Inhumans, and S.H.I.E.L.D. realizes that the attack was a cover for Hydra to steal something from the ATCU.
59	15	"Spacetime"	Kevin Tancharoen	Maurissa Tancharoen & Jed Whedon	April 5, 2016	2.81
S.H.I.E.L.D. picks up an emergency call about Daisy and finds the caller, who was shown a vision of his death by the Inhuman Charles Hinton, in time for him to learn Daisy's name before being murdered by Hydra, who capture Hinton. Daisy is able to touch Hinton first, giving her a vision of his death. Hive promises to reward Malick with "true power" for sending Ward through the portal; they use Hinton to obtain a powerful exoskeleton from a private corporation. Desperate to prove that fate is not fixed, S.H.I.E.L.D. seeks to stop Daisy's vision from playing out by sending May to find Hinton instead of Daisy, as the vision showed, but, at the last minute, Garner arrives, stating that he wants to say goodbye to May before he transforms into Lash for good. Subsequently, Daisy goes to the corporation where S.H.I.E.L.D. has tracked Hydra and Hinton and faces Malick and his exoskeleton. Hinton saves Daisy by distracting Malick, giving them both visions—hers of a S.H.I.E.L.D. agent dying in space—before dying himself.
60	16	"Paradise Lost"	Wendey Stanzler	George Kitson & Sharla Oliver	April 12, 2016	3.01
Malick's father died in 1970, leaving him and his brother Nathaniel to lead the "religious" side of Hydra, including periodically sending a sacrificial "traveler"—chosen at random from Hydra's inner circle—through the portal for Hive to inhabit until his return. Discovering that their father used a trick to never be chosen as the traveler, Gideon does the same and Nathaniel is chosen. In the present, Gideon tells his daughter Stephanie of his vision: he believes he saw his own death at the hands of Hive. Daisy and Lincoln track down J. T. James, an untransitioned Inhuman with knowledge of Hive who gives them an ancient Kree device. The rest of S.H.I.E.L.D. captures Giyera, Gideon's right-hand man who is now loyal to Hive. A telekinetic Inhuman, Giyera takes control of their plane and directs it to a Hydra base with most of S.H.I.E.L.D. as his prisoners. Hive comes to the Malicks' house and reveals to Gideon that he has Nathaniel's memories. As punishment for Gideon's betrayal of Nathaniel, Hive murders Stephanie in front of him.
61	17	"The Team"	Elodie Keene	DJ Doyle	April 19, 2016	2.85
Daisy and Lincoln unite with Gutierrez and Rodriguez as the Secret Warriors and infiltrate the Hydra base to free S.H.I.E.L.D. Gutierrez kills Lucio in the process, while Lincoln captures Malick. During questioning, Malick explains to Coulson that Hive can infect the minds of Inhumans, warning him against trusting any of the Secret Warriors. Simmons confirms from an autopsy of Lucio that Hive parasites had infected his brain and the same could have happened to any of the Secret Warriors. When Malick is found dead, the human agents trap the Inhumans in quarantine and search their belongings. They discover the Kree device in Lincoln's possession rather than in asset lockup; Lincoln protests, but the other three are released. That night, Daisy visits Lincoln and offers to break him out. Lincoln refuses when he realizes that Hive is controlling Daisy and used her to murder Malick and frame Lincoln. Daisy leaves on her own, creating an earthquake to destroy the S.H.I.E.L.D. base with everyone inside.
62	18	"The Singularity"	Garry A. Brown	Lauren LeFranc	April 26, 2016	3.22
Escaping the base mostly unharmed, S.H.I.E.L.D. knows that Daisy could have killed them all and believes there is hope of freeing her from Hive. Fitz and Simmons seek out transhumanist Holden Radcliffe, who believes in the improvement of humanity through enhancement and whose studies of parasites could help with counteracting Hive's abilities. Hive turns Alisha Whitley (a duplicating Inhuman ally of S.H.I.E.L.D.) and James (after first giving him terrigen which allows him to imbue objects with fire) to his cause and takes his fledgling army to interrupt Fitz and Simmons. Daisy warns Fitz of her vision, Hive's memories of Daniels petition Simmons to move on with her romantic life, and the others kidnap Radcliffe, taking him to a town that Hive bought with Malick's remaining fortune in order to recreate the original Kree experiments that made the first Inhumans. Talbot and the ATCU use Malick's final intel to completely dismantle Hydra's remaining infrastructure, and Fitz and Simmons finally consummate their relationship.
63	19	"Failed Experiments"	Wendey Stanzler	Brent Fletcher	May 3, 2016	2.92
Radcliffe's first attempt to turn humans into Inhumans fails, as he requires Kree blood. Fitz and Simmons attempt to combine their potential Inhuman cure with what they know of Radcliffe's research, but require an Inhuman test subject; Lincoln volunteers himself, severely compromising his immune system and seemingly proving that the cure cannot free the Inhumans of Hive's connection. S.H.I.E.L.D. locates Hive's town; Mack and May lead a team to hopefully free the others by simply killing Hive. The latter activates the Kree artifact, a beacon which calls two Kree reapers to the town. They promptly murder Whitley. Daisy and Hive each confront a reaper, with Daisy managing to begin harvesting hers' blood until the process is sabotaged by Mack. Hive, not realizing this, destroys the other reaper. Daisy attacks Mack, nearly killing him, but is interrupted by May, who helps Mack retreat with the rest of their team. Daisy then offers her own blood as an alternative for Radcliffe's experiment, as it was recently infused with Kree blood. (Note: As depicted in "T.A.H.I.T.I.".)
64	20	"Emancipation"	Vincent Misiano	Craig Titley	May 10, 2016	2.93
Following the signing of the Sokovia Accords, Talbot and Coulson discuss registering the Inhuman agents, with Coulson taking Talbot to the S.H.I.E.L.D. base to introduce him to Rodriguez and Lash, explain the Hive situation, and show him the need to keep the Secret Warriors anonymous. Hive captures several Watchdogs for Radcliffe's next experiment attempt; they are horrifically mutated into primitive Inhumans, but do fall under Hive's sway, prompting him to proceed with his ultimate plan—to use a warhead stolen from the ATCU to spread Radcliffe's new pathogen around the world and transform all humans into these primitives. Lincoln contacts Daisy and convinces her that he wants to be with her. Hacking into S.H.I.E.L.D.'s systems as her blood is drained, Daisy helps him escape the S.H.I.E.L.D. base in a quinjet. However, this was a ruse on S.H.I.E.L.D.'s part, with Lash arriving instead of Lincoln. Lash uses his abilities to free Daisy from Hive's sway, but is killed by James. Daisy escapes back to S.H.I.E.L.D.
65	21	"Absolution"	Billy Gierhart	Chris Dingess & Drew Z. Greenberg	May 17, 2016	3.03
S.H.I.E.L.D. keeps Daisy in containment while she is showing withdrawal symptoms after losing her connection to Hive, but her intel allows them to find the base from which Hive is attempting to launch the warhead. With Talbot's military contacts, S.H.I.E.L.D. is able to disable the rocket while a team of agents infiltrates the base, captures Hive, and extracts Radcliffe, with the latter agreeing to cooperate with S.H.I.E.L.D. and revealing that the Primitive process is irreversible. Giyera and James steal the warhead and, while S.H.I.E.L.D. is focused on locating it, detonate a bomb they smuggled into the S.H.I.E.L.D. hangar, releasing some of Radcliffe's pathogen. Several S.H.I.E.L.D. agents transform into Primitives that free Hive from his containment and he proceeds to steal Zephyr One, S.H.I.E.L.D.'s airborne mobile command that could take the warhead high enough for the pathogen to transform a large portion of humanity. Daisy escapes and confronts Hive, begging him to connect to her again.
66	22	"Ascension"	Kevin Tancharoen	Jed Whedon	May 17, 2016	3.03
Hive realizes that Lash has made Daisy impervious to his influence so, instead, he overpowers and abducts her. Giyera and James bring him the warhead, while many of the Primitives remain to kill the rest of S.H.I.E.L.D. May and Fitz infiltrate Zephyr One and free Daisy. Fitz kills Giyera, while Coulson and the others evade the Primitives and escape the base in the Quinjet, boarding Zephyr One. Coulson plans to send the warhead into space in the Quinjet to detonate safely; Daisy believes that she must go with it to atone for her actions under Hive's sway and fulfill her vision. She enters the Quinjet with the warhead, where she is confronted by Hive, but Lincoln throws her out and fries the jet's manual controls, ascending to space, where the warhead detonates and kills both him and Hive, thus fulfilling Daisy's vision. Six months later, Daisy has left S.H.I.E.L.D. and is operating as the vigilante "Quake", evading Coulson, who is no longer director of S.H.I.E.L.D. Radcliffe uploads his artificial intelligence AIDA into a Life Model Decoy.

== Cast and characters ==
=== Main ===
- Clark Gregg as Phil Coulson
- Ming-Na Wen as Melinda May
- Brett Dalton as Grant Ward and Hive (Note: Due to this Inhuman character's ability to possess corpses, Hive was briefly portrayed by Dillon Casey while it reanimated the body of Will Daniels, before Dalton took over the role when it reanimated the body of Ward. Additionally, Hive's original human form is briefly portrayed, through flashback, by Jason Glover.)
- Chloe Bennet as Daisy Johnson / Quake
- Iain De Caestecker as Leo Fitz
- Elizabeth Henstridge as Jemma Simmons
- Nick Blood as Lance Hunter
- Adrianne Palicki as Bobbi Morse
- Henry Simmons as Alphonso "Mack" Mackenzie
- Luke Mitchell as Lincoln Campbell

=== Recurring ===
- Constance Zimmer as Rosalind Price
- Andrew Howard as Luther Banks
- Juan Pablo Raba as Joey Gutierrez
- Spencer Treat Clark as Werner von Strucker
- Blair Underwood as Andrew Garner
  - Matthew Willig as Lash
- Powers Boothe as Gideon Malick
- Mark Dacascos as Giyera
- Natalia Cordova-Buckley as Elena "Yo-Yo" Rodriguez
- Adrian Pasdar as Glenn Talbot
- Axle Whitehead as J. T. James / Hellfire
- John Hannah as Holden Radcliffe

=== Notable guests ===
- William Sadler as Matthew Ellis
- Peter MacNicol as Elliot Randolph
- Tyler Ritter as Thomas Ward
- Brian Patrick Wade as Carl Creel
- Titus Welliver as Felix Blake
- Reed Diamond as Daniel Whitehall
- Derek Phillips as O'Brien

== Production ==
=== Development ===
In March 2014, executive producer Jeffrey Bell stated at the Agents of S.H.I.E.L.D. PaleyFest panel that the producers and the writers are able to read the screenplays for upcoming Marvel Cinematic Universe (MCU) films to know where the universe is heading, which allowed them to form a general plan for the show through the end of a third season. The series was renewed for that third season on May 7, 2015. By April 2015, Marvel had been developing a spin-off series to accompany the season, starring Adrianne Palicki and Nick Blood, but ABC opted not to go ahead with it, with entertainment president Paul Lee saying, "We thought the right thing now is to leave [Palicki and Blood] on S.H.I.E.L.D., because S.H.I.E.L.D. is so strong on [sic] the moment".

However, a pilot for the spinoff was ordered in August 2015, with the series titled Marvel's Most Wanted. Bell and fellow Agents of S.H.I.E.L.D. executive producer Paul Zbyszewski developed the series, while working on Hunter and Morse's storyline for season three, preparing them to move over to the spin-off. Bell explained that it would set up Marvel's Most Wanted by defining exactly who the characters are, such as Hunter and his lack of loyalty to S.H.I.E.L.D. and to ideologies—"nothing specific about the show, it's just who Hunter is"—and that while the characters are "on S.H.I.E.L.D., we want to take advantage of who they are, and give the audience as much of their relationship with one another, and with other people, as possible. We are aware that there is a potential imminent end, and so they won't be neglected."

Hunter and Morse are written off the series in the episode "Parting Shot", both leaving S.H.I.E.L.D., as Palicki and Blood "physically had to go leave to shoot the pilot ... they had to stop being on S.H.I.E.L.D. and get ready for the pilot and then shoot the pilot and all of that, so it didn't make sense for us to have all these episodes with them and then not have them in two or three episodes, and then go, 'Oh, we were just over here,' and then come back and go away again." On whether they could return to the series at some point, Bell said, "I can't answer that, but I can say it would be kind of cheating to make Mack cry like that only to buy it back—not that we haven't brought characters back from the dead. We want to earn stuff."

=== Writing ===
What's it like to be different?...I think that's [a] metaphor that people really resonate to, whether it's the color of your skin or your religion, or whether you're gay. The modern-day world is becoming more and more accepting of those things, but it still doesn't mean that there aren't challenges to them ... you could tell someone it's going to get better, but that doesn't mean it's going to get better for them. When you get to take that and put it in Marvel terms, it's, "OK, everything I touch turns to ice ... what's going to happen to me? And do I want to live in this world?

— Marvel Television head Jeph Loeb on the real life parallels to the Inhumans that the season explores.

In May 2015, Bell said that writing for the third season would begin the following month, with the story set six months after the events that concluded the second season. Bell stated that S.H.I.E.L.D. would be depicted as it was in the second season, underground with small "pockets" of S.H.I.E.L.D. around the world, as following the release of Captain America: The Winter Soldier (2014) "we found we like our team ... as underdogs, as opposed to a giant, powerful, NSA organization that can do pretty much anything".

Regarding the characters that could appear in the season, Bell said in May 2015 that "The idea of some familiar faces with some new faces is something to look forward to. I also think finding some new Marvel characters to pull into the universe would be cool. Fans seem to respond when there are characters from the Marvel Comics and Marvel Cinematic Universe." He later explained that the series has the opportunity to explore the Inhumans outside of the Inhuman Royal Family (who are the major focus of the comics, television series and previously planned film). The season mentions the character Eden Fesi as an Inhuman, who is a mutant in the comics. The change was due to 20th Century Fox controlling the film and television rights to the majority of Marvel's X-Men and mutant characters.

When asked about possible hints made in the season two finale towards an adaptation of Secret Warriors by Jonathan Hickman and Brian Michael Bendis, Bell noted that the series does share the character Daisy Johnson with that comic, and "the idea of a team of powered people is something we've seen in the show ... I think there's a world down the road where we do our version." Elaborating on this and the series dealing with the many powered people introduced in season two, Bell said, "People seem to respond to powered people on the show and while it's not going to take over and become what the show's about, as a texture and flavor of the stories, we really enjoy that. The fact that Inhumans are now out there is something I think we need to investigate". He later clarified that characters would not have to be Inhuman to join the Secret Warriors, just powered, and that not just any powered character would be allowed to join, given that Daisy had to go through years of training on top of getting powers to join the team, and so similar rules would apply to other potential members. Executive producers Maurissa Tancharoen and Jed Whedon also discussed the Secret Warriors, the former cautioning "a very slow build" to the team, and the latter explaining, "We feel a duty to the Cinematic Universe to not hyper-accelerate how many people have powers ... We don't want it to be there's a thousand people with powers with a show that at its heart is about what it's like to not have powers in a world with powers."

In September 2015, Tancharoen stated the overall theme for the season explored with each character was them "trying to get back in touch with their humanity in a world where Inhumans are popping up", with Whedon adding that the nature of couples–some having broken up in previous episodes, some getting back together, and potential for new ones–would be explored. Later that month, Bell talked about some of the new character pairings in the season, saying "Putting Mack and Daisy together; putting Hunter and May together; putting Bobbi and Fitz together—suddenly you have all these different dynamics, all these different stories that you didn't have before." Tancharoen later highlighted the number of characters in the season compared to previous, stating that "There's more scale and scope, but at the same time, I think we're diving into each character's internal struggle a little bit more."

At the center of the show now is this question of, if you could choose [becoming Inhuman], would you want to? Would you choose to have this happen to you? Is it a choice? People who change, how do we treat them? Do they immediately have freedom to be who they want to be? Or is it a very dangerous weapon that we have to control or at least understand?"

— Jed Whedon on the introduction of a possible "cure" for Inhumanity.

The second part of the season, which begins with episode 11, takes place three months after the events of episode 10. On the structure of the season and shifting the focus between the two parts, Bell stated it was the intent to follow the format from season two, by tying "a whole bunch of [interesting threads] but not all of them off by the midseason. And then we launch something exciting for the back half...the promise of more to come." Whedon added that "though we do break the season up, we feel that the season as a whole is one arc" and so the series would explore the same themes in the second half, "themes of what it means to be human and Inhuman. What does it mean to all these people when they have to live with their actions? Are they capable of the things their enemies are capable of?...What is the true nature of a person? Is everybody capable of everything if put in a terrible position? Or is there true good and a true evil?" The second half of the season sees the introduction of the comics' right-wing hate group the Watchdogs, depicted as radicals wishing to "eliminate the Inhumans", as well as a "cure" that can prevent terrigenisis in yet-to-transition Inhumans.

"Bouncing Back" opens with "a mysterious flash-forward to three months in the future, showing an unidentified S.H.I.E.L.D. agent seemingly dead in space". Tancharoen called it "the promise of something fairly ominous to come", and stated, "We will be uncovering things from the midseason opener all the way to the finale. We will slowly be discovering what that image is." She added that any "clues" would likely play out during present day sequences rather than further flash-forwards, such as when Daisy receives a vision of the flash-forward in "Spacetime", an episode where she learns that "she cannot change the outcome of these visions and the future is the future". Whedon discussed this idea, and that of the "theory behind the Inhumans that each one of them serves a purpose", saying, Inhumans "are made, they're not random. There's a lack of something that needs filling and an Inhuman will be created that fills that niche. It's an interesting concept we like playing with, and that plays into the idea of fate, which with our future visions, we're hitting pretty hard." On choosing Lincoln to be the one to die, which the executive producers knew going into the season when forming the arcs for Lincoln, Daisy, and Ward, Bell said he "earned it" adding that Lincoln comes to a point where he realizes what his purpose is, with Whedon noting that he understands that Daisy has a different purpose. Whedon continued that the decision was based on the fact that the series did not "want to be a body count show, but it is a real world with real stakes. What we had not done is the heroic death and the full-sacrifice death. This was a conscious decision. We also think that there's a poetry in the fact that the person doing it doesn't consider himself a hero. That's the beauty of the moment—it's not just for [Daisy], but it is, and it's not just for him, but it is."

Discussing the season finale, Tancharoen stated, "This season, we've explored a lot of different themes: There's the notion of purpose. We also introduced an Inhuman who has a strong sense of faith. We talk a lot about destiny and all these things intertwine." Bennet likened the end of the season to "the end of the first book of S.H.I.E.L.D. This finale feels like the end of something bigger and the beginning of a whole new tone for the show". Whedon added, "We wanted to put a close to [Hive's] story. We knew going into this season what our plan was for both Ward and Hive. Our goal was to make it not just feel like victory—we like to get a victory and also a loss at the same time." On whether the Inhumans storyline would also be ending with the season, Whedon said, "We think of it as never closed. We like that we were able to open up that world and make Inhumans a permanent part of the universe. Now, we have a quick-fire way of introducing people with powers. It gives us a lot of leeway in our world, and it lets us explode the metaphors of what it is like to be different. We will never close that chapter." On making a six-month time jump at the end of "Ascension", Bell said that despite each character completing their arcs this season, "we still have a lot of plot. Emotionally, their arcs are done. What the jump lets you do is to do a reset ... It allows us to put down a lot of old plot and pick up a lot of new." Whedon added, "We've done it each season, so we just wanted to do it a little early ... we would've done [the time jump] in episode 1 next year but what we wanted to do was tease" things to come at the end of this season.

=== Casting ===
All principal cast members from the first and second seasons (Clark Gregg as Phil Coulson, Ming-Na Wen as Melinda May, Brett Dalton as Grant Ward, Chloe Bennet as Daisy Johnson (no longer going by the name of "Skye"), Iain De Caestecker as Leo Fitz, Elizabeth Henstridge as Jemma Simmons, Nick Blood as Lance Hunter, and Adrianne Palicki as Bobbi Morse) return for the third season. In May 2015, Bell said that the writers would look to incorporate the character Lincoln Campbell into the season, as he was a "nice addition" to the second season, and that they were looking forward to exploring Alphonso "Mack" Mackenzie's character in new ways during the third season following his role in the second-season finale. Luke Mitchell and Henry Simmons, who recurred as Lincoln and Mack, respectively, throughout the second season, were subsequently promoted to the principal cast for the third. During the season, Grant Ward is killed. His body is possessed by the parasitic Inhuman Hive, based on a creature from the Secret Warriors comic, with Dalton taking on that role. Also returning from earlier in the series are Daz Crawford as Kebo, Peter MacNicol as Elliot Randolph, Blair Underwood as Andrew Garner, Alicia Vela-Bailey as Alisha Whitley, Brian Patrick Wade as Carl Creel, Adrian Pasdar as Glenn Talbot, Raquel Gardner as Carla Talbot, Titus Welliver as Felix Blake, Reed Diamond as Daniel Whitehall, and Derek Phillips as O'Brien.

In July 2015, the Inhuman Lash, a villainous character from the comics, was confirmed to be appearing in the season, while Andrew Howard and Constance Zimmer were cast as Luther Banks and Rosalind Price, respectively, both recurring. In August 2015, Matthew Willig was revealed to be cast as Lash, while Juan Pablo Raba was announced as another new Inhuman, Joey Gutierrez. In October, Powers Boothe was announced in the recurring role of Gideon Malick, the previously unnamed World Security Council member that he portrayed in The Avengers. The next month, Lash was revealed to be the Inhuman form of Andrew Garner, and Mark Dacascos was announced in the "heavily recurring" role of Giyera. Tyler Ritter appeared as Grant Ward's younger brother Thomas in December 2015. The character previously appeared as a boy through flashbacks in "The Well". By February 2016, Natalia Cordova-Buckley was cast as Elena "Yo-Yo" Rodriguez, a Secret Warrior from the comics. Axle Whitehead and John Hannah also recur as the Inhuman J. T. James / Hellfire and scientist Holden Radcliffe, respectively. Additionally, Alexander Wraith makes multiple appearances as the minor S.H.I.E.L.D. agent Anderson, while William Sadler reprises his role of President Matthew Ellis from Iron Man 3 (2013).

=== Design ===
The season introduces a new title graphic for the series, replacing the one that appeared for the first two seasons, as well as a new aircraft for the team called Zephyr One, designed by series visual effects vendor FuseFX. Glenn Hetrick again worked with the make-up and visual effects departments to design and create the more "unique"-looking Inhumans, such as Lash, after having worked on Raina during season two. Willig's Lash make-up initially took 6 hours to apply, but the make-up team was able to reduce the time to 4.5 hours. Before a new Inhuman character can be introduced, the cost of creating their powers must be weighed, with Bell saying, "Can we afford to produce this effect? Because every time last year Gordon [teleported] we went, 'Wow, that was [expensive].'" For the S.H.I.E.L.D. agents' costumes, series costume designer Ann Foley made sure to reflect the fact that they have "graduated from the ragtag group of soldiers and scientists to the more precise militaristic outfit they always imagined they were". As well, once Simmons returns from Maveth, her costumes did not feature any color, patterns, or prints, in order to reflect Simmons' emotional space.

Bennet cut her hair for the season, in order to further her character's transformation to the Daisy Johnson / Quake of the comics, while not cutting her hair as short as her comic counterpart. Bennet stated, "The comic book version of Daisy Johnson has very short, Miley Cyrus-esque hair. We wanted to stay true to the comic book character fans love; I wanted to please them but also make sure there was still some movement and length and sexiness in the hair." Bennet also received a new costume for the season, along with Quake's signature gauntlets. On the costume, Foley said, "It's about strength. She feels very empowered in it....I wanted to stay true to some of the designs I saw in the comics. In the style lines, I wanted to pay a little bit of a tribute to [Daisy's] tactical ability from last season, but we also incorporated the Quake symbol into her gauntlets and on the back of her suit." Legacy Effects created the gauntlets and utility belt, "out of flexible materials painted to look like metal" so as not to injure anyone during stunts.

After losing a hand at the end of the second season, Coulson receives a prosthetic replacement with "a few surprises hidden inside". Prop master Scott Bauer took a mold of Gregg's hand to build the prosthetic and was able to make the fingers bendable to depict Coulson holding objects. The hand evolves throughout the season, with a later iteration projecting an energy shield, inspired by a similar one used in the comics by Captain America. The energy shield was created by Cosa, one of the series' visual effects vendors.

=== Filming ===
Production on the season began in late July 2015, in Culver City, California, and lasted until late April 2016. Location filming for the alien planet occurred in a work quarry in Simi Valley and in Northridge, Los Angeles near the Mojave Desert.

=== Music ===
With the season reinventing the series again, composer Bear McCreary expanded the sound of the score "in a big way". In addition to introducing new themes for the characters of Lash and Rosalind Price, McCreary made some changes to the orchestra: "To represent Lash, I brought in larger percussion: merciless pounding taikos that I digitally compressed and distorted. This new, mangled percussion sound is horrific, and will become increasingly important as the season progresses." McCreary also brought in trombones "to get the scariest sound possible", which resulted in the recording space being reconfigured when they were recorded. For Price, her scenes with Coulson "give the series the feeling of a dense political thriller...I really leaned into that, musically. I introduce light acoustic percussion, mostly egg shakers, to give the pulsing synths a softer edge. And I used an acoustic piano to play the 'Rosalind Theme' at key moments in her scenes...her music is meant to add intrigue and suspicion, and simultaneously allow us to have some fun with their witty banter." For "Maveth", McCreary used a 90-piece orchestra rather than the series' typical 50 or 70 players.

=== Marvel Cinematic Universe tie-ins ===
On the season's potential for crossover with the rest of the MCU, Bell said in May 2015 that "I think [last] year worked really well—we got to be our own show and tell our own stories in the Marvel Cinematic Universe and do a nice hand off or a tie-in, but neither are incumbent upon the other to be a follow, and I think that's a great model for us. Ant-Man comes out this summer and will have come and gone before we air again in September, so whether there's anything vestigial from that or for [Captain America: Civil War] next season is to be determined. But we're in contact with the movie people and them with us, and any time we can put little easter eggs in, it's a lot of fun for die-hard fans." Bell also stated that there was a possibility of Hayley Atwell once again reprising her role as Peggy Carter in the season for an Agent Carter (2015–2016) crossover, and after the series acknowledged the character's death in Civil War, added, "Any time we can make a connection to her, whether in a flashback or dealing with what's happening now, it makes the universe smaller."

In June 2015, it was revealed that the season would include the Secret Warriors team by introducing Inhuman characters inspired by the comic of the same name. The episode "Emancipation" is set in the aftermath of Civil War, and deals with how the Secret Warriors and other Inhumans are affected by the Sokovia Accords, with some members of the S.H.I.E.L.D. team feeling "Inhumans should be registered and [others] who feel that's a first step to them being sequestered, imprisoned, exterminated". Wen noted that "The connection is there, but it's also very tenuous at this point, because S.H.I.E.L.D. has become so isolated with what's going on with the Avengers and them not knowing still that Coulson is alive". On how the themes of Civil War allowed the series to make more of a philosophical tie-in than with previous films, Whedon stated that "we do have people across the globe who have powers on our show and there would be varying reactions to that. A lot of fear, some excitement, some people wanting to use it for good, some people wanting to use it for evil. So, a lot of those same themes [from the film] will be addressed on our show." Bennet added, "we've been dealing with the bigger issues of Civil War on a smaller, more personal scale for a while now. It's been building. We've been having our own mini version of Civil War."

Additionally, the episode "Many Heads, One Tale" sees the season tie its Hydra and Inhuman storylines together, retconning the history of Hydra in the MCU, while the episode "Watchdogs" connects the series to several other MCU television shows: by featuring the chemical compound nitramene, which was developed by Howard Stark and seen in the Agent Carter episodes "Now is Not the End" and "Bridge and Tunnel"; by noting a gang war in Hell's Kitchen, as seen in the second season of Daredevil (2015–2018); and by referencing the company Damage Control, which was the focus of a potential MCU television series of the same name and later seen in Spider-Man: Homecoming (2017). Despite similarities between the final conversation between Daisy and Lincoln in "Ascension" and that of Steve Rogers and Carter in Captain America: The First Avenger (2011), the executive producers did not mirror that scene intentionally, with Whedon stating "There's something heartbreaking about not being able to be face-to-face with the person". "Ascension" also introduces the concept of Life Model Decoys.

== Marketing ==
Promotional image for Agents of S.H.I.E.L.D.: Fallen Agent

To promote the inclusion of the Secret Warriors in the season, at San Diego Comic-Con in 2015, Marvel gave fans a chance to be a part of the team, with ambassadors roaming the convention to find the most dedicated fans and rewarding them with limited edition "Secret Warriors" pins. Fans with pins were then asked to post a photo of themselves wearing the pin to social media, for cast members of the series to select their favorites. A premiere was held for the season on September 23, 2015, at Pacific Theatres at The Grove in Los Angeles, where the first episode was shown. In early October, Marvel released a comedy video starring Dalton and Marvel Entertainment Chief Creative Officer Joe Quesada discussing a potential rebranding for Hydra, which was conceived and written by Dalton. On October 9, 2015, "A Wanted (Inhu)man" was screened at New York Comic Con, and on March 26, 2016, "Watchdogs" was screened at WonderCon.

Also at WonderCon, a poster based on the season was made available, with art by Mike McKone. It features Daisy, her pose an homage to a well-known Secret Warriors cover depicting the comic version of the character, with other main characters paired behind her (Coulson and Price, the latter because "she really was a big part of the first half of the season and ... her death is the thing [that] drives Coulson", according to Bell; Fitz and Simmons; Hunter and Morse; May and Garner / Lash; and Mack and Elena Rodriguez). Lincoln is featured on his own, so as not to "take a super strong female character [Daisy] and reduce her to being a part of a relationship where she won't be fulfilled until she finds her man", as are Ward / Hive and Malick, the latter with the symbol of the former upon him: "We have told you who Ward's become, and Hive is the person that Malick is really in a relationship with. So the fact that reflection is on him or in him or around him is pretty potent", explained Bell.

Beginning with "The Singularity", the final episodes of the season were marketed as Agents of S.H.I.E.L.D.: Fallen Agent, a "four-episode event". Marvel released clues as to who the Fallen Agent was online in the form of "sneak peek clips, artwork and more", leading up to the final reveal in the season finale. Marvel also released a poster for the event that recreated the cover of the "iconic" The Amazing Spider-Man #121 that served as the first issue of the story arc "The Night Gwen Stacy Died". The poster, created by Greg Land, also appeared as a "rare 1:1000" variant cover for Civil War II #0. Ahead of the final two episodes of the season, Marvel released a series of videos that "memorialized" each of the potential characters who could have been the Fallen Agent, with the Fallen Agent ultimately being Lincoln Campbell.

A Lexus-sponsored five-part web series, Agents of S.H.I.E.L.D.: Academy, released from March 9 to May 4, 2016, on ABC.com and Watch ABC. In Academy, three Agents of S.H.I.E.L.D. fans compete to play an agent in that series. Members of the Agents of S.H.I.E.L.D. cast also appear. All three fans ultimately made cameo appearances in the season finale, "Absolution". Agents of S.H.I.E.L.D.: Academy was nominated at the 28th Producers Guild of America Awards for Outstanding Digital Series.

== Release ==
=== Broadcast ===
The season began airing in the United States on ABC on September 29, 2015, and ran for 22 episodes. In Australia, the season aired on Fox8, rather than Seven Network with previous seasons, with a two-week delay from the U.S. airings. In the United Kingdom, the season moved to E4 after previously airing on Channel 4, and debuted on January 10, 2016.

=== Home media ===
The season began streaming on Netflix in the United States on June 16, 2016, and was available until February 28, 2022. It was released on Blu-ray and DVD in Region 4 on March 1, 2017. It became available on Disney+ in the United States on March 16, 2022, joining other territories where it was already available on the service.

== Reception ==
=== Ratings ===
Viewership and ratings per episode of Agents of S.H.I.E.L.D. season 3
No.	Title	Air date	Rating/share (18–49)	Viewers (millions)	DVR (18–49)	DVR viewers (millions)	Total (18–49)	Total viewers (millions)
1	"Laws of Nature"	September 29, 2015	1.7/5	4.90	1.2	2.96	2.9	7.86
2	"Purpose in the Machine"	October 6, 2015	1.6/5	4.32	1.2	2.92	2.8	7.24
3	"A Wanted (Inhu)man"	October 13, 2015	1.4/4	3.74	0.9	2.48	2.3	6.22
4	"Devils You Know"	October 20, 2015	1.5/4	3.85	1.0	2.54	2.5	6.39
5	"4,722 Hours"	October 27, 2015	1.4/4	3.81	1.1	2.59	2.5	6.40
6	"Among Us Hide..."	November 3, 2015	1.4/4	3.84	1.1	2.64	2.5	6.48
7	"Chaos Theory"	November 10, 2015	1.3/4	3.49	1.0	2.37	2.3	5.86
8	"Many Heads, One Tale"	November 17, 2015	1.3/4	3.60	1.1	2.69	2.4	6.29
9	"Closure"	December 1, 2015	1.3/4	3.84	1.1	2.62	2.4	6.46
10	"Maveth"	December 8, 2015	1.3/4	3.85	0.9	2.16	2.2	6.01
11	"Bouncing Back"	March 8, 2016	1.1/4	3.52	1.0	2.43	2.1	5.95
12	"The Inside Man"	March 15, 2016	1.0/3	2.94	0.9	2.24	1.9	5.18
13	"Parting Shot"	March 22, 2016	0.9/3	2.88	0.9	2.31	1.8	5.19
14	"Watchdogs"	March 29, 2016	1.0/3	3.20	0.9	2.19	1.9	5.39
15	"Spacetime"	April 5, 2016	0.9/3	2.81	1.1	2.33	2.0	5.14
16	"Paradise Lost"	April 12, 2016	1.0/3	3.01	0.9	2.19	1.9	5.20
17	"The Team"	April 19, 2016	0.9/3	2.85	0.8	2.03	1.7	4.89
18	"The Singularity"	April 26, 2016	1.0/3	3.22	0.9	2.16	1.9	5.38
19	"Failed Experiments"	May 3, 2016	0.9/3	2.92	0.9	2.10	1.8	5.02
20	"Emancipation"	May 10, 2016	0.9/3	2.93	0.9	2.03	1.8	4.96
21	"Absolution"	May 17, 2016	1.0/4	3.03	0.8	1.95	1.8	4.98
22	"Ascension"	May 17, 2016	1.0/4	3.03	0.8	1.95	1.8	4.98

The season averaged 5.52 million total viewers, including from DVR, ranking 85th among network series in the 2015–16 television season. It also had an average total 18–49 rating of 2.0, which was 47th.

=== Critical response ===
The review aggregator website Rotten Tomatoes reports a 100% approval rating with an average score of 8.2/10, based on 22 reviews. The website's consensus reads, "Still evolving in its third season, Marvel's Agents of S.H.I.E.L.D. further hits its stride with a blend of thrills, humor, and heart."

Based on the premiere, Merrill Barr of Forbes felt that the show "has grown up a lot since its first year, and with the start of season three, it's hard to imagine what complaints any fans could possibly still have. If you want overall continuity, you got it. If you want people with super powers going crazy, it's there. If you want an ensemble cast that brings the broadcast television corner of the MCU to life, then look no further. The point is, with the new season of S.H.I.E.L.D., it's everything one could ask from the show." Vulture's Scott Meslow stated that the premiere was "riddled with [many] visual signifiers, highlighting the ways Agents of S.H.I.E.L.D. has gradually become sharper, sleeker, and more reliant on the bones of its comic-book source material".

Kevin Fitzpatrick at ScreenCrush said that "Laws of Nature" "feels [like] the show's most confident, ambitious swing yet, its action-packed opening minutes a clear mission statement with an even more specific focus than Season 2". Brian Lowry, reviewing the episode for Variety, said, "Television obviously can't compete with the budgets and action found in summer blockbusters...but it has an advantage in being able to explore characters. Agents of S.H.I.E.L.D. obviously possesses a core audience drawn to those attributes, and showrunners Jed Whedon and Maurissa Tancharoen have admirably kept the plot moving ahead—engaging in larger serialized narratives—while grappling with the logistics of those ancillary considerations, which include plans for an Inhumans movie".

Eric Goldman of IGN scored the season a 7.9 out of 10, feeling it "had its up and downs, mixing in elements that worked (Daisy getting her Quake on, the Fitz and Simmons drama), elements we could have used more of (Secret Warriors!) and elements that just never felt right (Lincoln and his relationship with Daisy)". Goldman also felt that the first half of the season was "the stronger, more cohesive of the two halves" as it aired the episode "4,722 Hours" which Goldman called "the best hour of Agents of S.H.I.E.L.D. to date". He criticized the pacing of the season, saying "some episodes felt a bit jumbled and could have benefited from slowing down a bit—or simply not trying to do so much at once. Sometimes it was just a question of including too many characters or storylines in single episodes, causing some scenarios to not have time to breathe or get the proper build up they might have with more character-focused episodes."

=== Analysis ===
The season's connection to Captain America: Civil War of paralleling that film's themes and events was noted by critics.

Alex McCown, writing for The A.V. Club, called the season's use of the Watchdogs as "the most topical and relevant to our real-world situation Marvel's Agents of S.H.I.E.L.D. has ever gotten", comparing the group to Cliven Bundy and supporters of Donald Trump's 2016 presidential campaign, and feeling that "It's heartening to see the series laying this much groundwork in anticipation of mirroring the events of Civil War. We've all talked about how the films affect the shows, but not vice versa. This narrative means S.H.I.E.L.D. is taking full advantage of its medium in order to tell the story the upcoming Captain America film can't: A full and fraught exploration of the need to protect freedom and privacy, even for those with extraordinary abilities."

Fitzpatrick further discussed the "downright eerie parallel to current events" the Watchdogs brought to the series, saying that "if you stare at the news long enough it starts to mirror fiction, and boy if Agents of S.H.I.E.L.D. didn't terrifyingly benefit from that [in "Watchdogs"]....Sometimes, anyone in need of someone to blame for their troubles can fall in with radicals." Fitzpatrick noted other MCU tie-ins in the same episode "never felt particularly labored, but rather lived-in with a world that stretches back to Agent Carter-era Stark tech, drops the odd Daredevil Easter Egg, and helps contextualize a world where heroes create country-dropping robots....A topical bent like tonight's "Watchdogs" made for a great angle to build up that world mentality without feeling particularly subservient to the movies."

=== Accolades ===
The Atlantic named "4,722 Hours" one of the best television episodes of 2015.

Year	Award	Category	Nominee(s)	Result	Ref.
2016	Kids' Choice Awards	Favorite Family TV Show	Agents of S.H.I.E.L.D.	Nominated	
2016	Kids' Choice Awards	Favorite Female TV Star – Family Show	Chloe Bennet	Nominated	
2016	Kids' Choice Awards	Favorite Female TV Star – Family Show	Ming-Na Wen	Nominated	
2016	Saturn Awards	Best Superhero Adaptation Series	Agents of S.H.I.E.L.D.	Nominated	
2016	Teen Choice Awards	Choice TV Villain	Brett Dalton	Nominated	
2016	California On Location Awards	Location Manager of the Year – One Hour Television	Justin Hill	Won	
