= Bouncing Back =

- Agents of S.H.I.E.L.D. episode
- Episode no.: Season 3 Episode 11
- Directed by: Ron Underwood
- Written by: Monica Owusu-Breen
- Cinematography by: Feliks Parnell
- Editing by: Kelly Stuyvesant
- Original air date: March 8, 2016
- Running time: 43 minutes

Guest appearances
- Powers Boothe as Gideon Malick; Juan Pablo Raba as Joey Gutierrez; William Sadler as Matthew Ellis; Natalia Cordova-Buckley as Elena Rodriguez; Mark Dacascos as Giyera; Spencer Treat Clark as Werner von Strucker; Yancey Arias as Victor Ramon; Gabriel Salvador as Lucio

Episode chronology
← Previous "Maveth"	Next → "The Inside Man"
- Agents of S.H.I.E.L.D. season 3

"Bouncing Back" is the eleventh episode of the third season of the American television series Agents of S.H.I.E.L.D. Based on the Marvel Comics organization S.H.I.E.L.D., it follows Phil Coulson and his team of S.H.I.E.L.D. agents as they investigate the appearance of a new Inhuman. It is set in the Marvel Cinematic Universe (MCU) and acknowledges the franchise's films. The episode was written by Monica Owusu-Breen, and directed by Ron Underwood.

Clark Gregg reprises his role as Coulson from the film series, and is joined by series regulars Ming-Na Wen, Brett Dalton, Chloe Bennet, Iain De Caestecker, Elizabeth Henstridge, Nick Blood, Adrianne Palicki, Henry Simmons, and Luke Mitchell.

"Bouncing Back" originally aired on ABC on March 8, 2016, and according to Nielsen Media Research, was watched by 3.52 million viewers.

== Plot ==
The episode opens with a mysterious flash-forward to three months in the future, showing an unidentified S.H.I.E.L.D. agent being killed in an explosion in space.

In Bogotá, Colombia, Elena Rodriguez, an Inhuman with super-speed (but who can only travel a certain distance between heartbeats, before being teleported back to the point from which she started), steals a large amount of weapons from the Colombian police. The next day Daisy Johnson, Alphonso "Mack" Mackenzie, Bobbi Morse, Lance Hunter and Joey Gutierrez investigate the thefts, but Mack is abducted by Elena. The team track them down and subdue Elena, but she later explains that the police are corrupt, and she has been using her newfound powers (which she believes to be a gift from God) to stop them from hurting innocents.

Hunter and Morse find her cousin Francisco disposing of the weapons in a river, but the police arrive, including Lucio, an Inhuman with paralytic vision. Lucio immobilizes Francisco, who is executed, and Hunter and Morse, who are abducted. Daisy, Mack, Elena and Joey attack the police station and rescue Hunter and Morse, while Lucio is defeated when Joey welds his sunglasses to his face, after which he is abducted by Hydra.

Back in the United States, Phil Coulson (now the director of S.H.I.E.L.D. again) and Melinda May meet with President Matthew Ellis at Rosalind Price's abandoned apartment. With Price having vouched for S.H.I.E.L.D. before her death, Ellis has decided to let them continue dealing with the Inhuman threat as a "black ops" unit, and to have the new head of the Advanced Threat Containment Unit (ATCU) answer to Coulson. Elsewhere, Gideon Malick has been tending to the ancient Inhuman, who is very weak from the millennia of clinging to life, but is growing stronger, promising that Malick's faith in his capabilities is not misplaced. He also displays one of his powers, to disperse Grant Ward's body into a mass of particles, and vows to "make a believer" of Giyera. To find Malick, Coulson uses John Garrett's mind probe, in conjunction with Lincoln Campbell's powers, on a vegetative Werner von Strucker, who awakens long enough to inform them of a location where Malick can be contacted. There Coulson finds a phone, through which he calls Malick, while May traces the call to a number of locations worldwide, where Malick's various companies can be found, though he promptly sells them.

Elena agrees to be a reserve member of the Secret Warriors, but refuses to leave Colombia. She gains the nickname "Yo-Yo" from Mack. Jemma Simmons and Leo Fitz address the distance between them since he destroyed Will Daniels's body on Maveth, which she does not blame him for because Will was already dead, and they agree to start over. May consoles Coulson over his decision to murder Ward, telling him that he "joined the Cavalry".

In an end tag, Ellis informs Coulson that he has appointed Glenn Talbot as the new head of the ATCU.

== Production ==
=== Development ===
In February 2016, Marvel announced that the eleventh episode of the season would be titled "Bouncing Back", to be written by Monica Owusu-Breen, with Ron Underwood directing.

=== Writing ===
The episode opens with "a mysterious flash-forward to three months in the future, showing an unidentified S.H.I.E.L.D. agent seemingly dead in space." Executive producer Maurissa Tancharoen called it "the promise of something fairly ominous to come", and stated, "We will be uncovering things from the midseason opener all the way to the finale. We will slowly be discovering what that image is." Her fellow showrunner Jed Whedon explained that the decision to use the flash-forward device in the episode was made "to kick off [the second part of the season] with a mystery."

=== Casting ===
In February 2016, Natalia Cordova-Buckley was revealed to be portraying Elena "Yo-Yo" Rodriguez, based on the character from the Secret Warriors comic. Cordova-Buckley said she had auditioned for a character called "Adriana Molina", only learning she was actually playing Rodriguez shortly before filming the episode. Learning this, she called it "a dream come true" to portray a Latina superhero.

A week later, Marvel revealed that main cast members Clark Gregg, Ming-Na Wen, Brett Dalton, Chloe Bennet, Iain De Caestecker, Elizabeth Henstridge, Nick Blood, Adrianne Palicki, Henry Simmons, and Luke Mitchell would star as Phil Coulson, Melinda May, Grant Ward, Daisy Johnson, Leo Fitz, Jemma Simmons, Lance Hunter, Bobbi Morse, Alphonso "Mack" Mackenzie, and Lincoln Campbell, respectively. It was also revealed that Natalia Cordova-Buckley would guest star in "Bouncing Back", along with Juan Pablo Raba as Joey Gutierrez, Spencer Treat Clark as Werner von Strucker, Powers Boothe as Gideon Malick, William Sadler as President Matthew Ellis, Mark Dacascos as Giyera, Paul Lincoln Alayo as Francisco Rodriguez, Vance Valencia as Turkish old man, Yancey Arias as Colonel Victor Ramon, Gabriel Salvador as Lucio, Jamie Alvarez as lead officer, Ronnie Alvarez as uniformed officer and Eric Thomas Wilson as Hydra guard. Alayo, Valencia, Jamie Alvarez, Ronnie Alvarez, and Wilson did not receive guest star credit in the episode. Raba, Clark, Boothe, Sadler, and Dacascos reprise their roles from earlier in the series.

== Broadcast ==
"Bouncing Back" was first aired in the United States on ABC on March 8, 2016.

== Reception ==
In the United States the episode received a 1.1/4 percent share among adults between the ages of 18 and 49, meaning that it was seen by 1.1 percent of all households, and 4 percent of all of those watching television at the time of the broadcast. It was watched by 3.52 million viewers.
