= Parting Shot =

- Agents of S.H.I.E.L.D. episode
- Episode no.: Season 3 Episode 13
- Directed by: Michael Zinberg
- Written by: Paul Zbyszewski
- Cinematography by: Feliks Parnell
- Editing by: Joshua Charson
- Original air date: March 22, 2016
- Running time: 43 minutes

Guest appearances
- Powers Boothe as Gideon Malick; William Sadler as Matthew Ellis; Bethany Joy Lenz as Stephanie Malick; Ravil Isyanov as Anton Petrov; Ivo Nandi as Duval; Endre Hules as Dmitry Olshenko; Kristof Konrad as Androvich

Episode chronology
← Previous "The Inside Man"	Next → "Watchdogs"
- Agents of S.H.I.E.L.D. season 3

"Parting Shot" is the thirteenth episode of the third season of the American television series Agents of S.H.I.E.L.D. Based on the Marvel Comics organization S.H.I.E.L.D., it follows Phil Coulson and his team of S.H.I.E.L.D. agents as they infiltrate a Russian facility intended for Inhumans. It is set in the Marvel Cinematic Universe (MCU) and acknowledges the franchise's films. The episode was written by Paul Zbyszewski, and directed by Michael Zinberg.

Clark Gregg reprises his role as Coulson from the film series, and is joined by series regulars Ming-Na Wen, Chloe Bennet, Iain De Caestecker, Elizabeth Henstridge, Nick Blood, Adrianne Palicki and Henry Simmons.

The episode marked the final regular appearances of Blood and Palicki, and was intended to lead into a planned spin-off series, Marvel's Most Wanted.

"Parting Shot" originally aired on ABC on March 22, 2016, and according to Nielsen Media Research, was watched by 2.88 million viewers.

== Plot ==
Imprisoned at an Interpol facility, Bobbi Morse and Lance Hunter are interrogated by Duval, who wants them to admit that they are S.H.I.E.L.D. agents, so Russia can blame them for the deaths of three government officials and declare war on the United States in revenge. Flashbacks to the previous day depict the events which led to the agents' imprisonment. Following the events of "The Inside Man", Gideon Malick's plane lands in Siberia, and Morse and Hunter pursue him and Anton Petrov to an abandoned facility they intend to repurpose into the Inhuman sanctuary, which has been banned by the Russian Prime Minister, Dmitry Olshenko. Melinda May, Daisy Johnson and Alphonso "Mack" Mackenzie join Hunter and Morse, and the five of them infiltrate the facility, discovering the dead body of Olshenko's personal attaché. Cabinet ministers opposed to Olshenko arrive to meet with Malick and Petrov, who reveal that the attaché was murdered by General Androvich, the Minister of Defence, revealed to be an Inhuman who can manifest and control living shadows made of Darkforce. Malick suggests they have Androvich assassinate Olshenko, who soon arrives looking for his missing attaché. Malick departs, leaving Androvich to make his assassination attempt, but the S.H.I.E.L.D. team causes a distraction, and Hunter rescues Olshenko and kills Petrov. Androvich unleashes a Darkforce shadow, which subdues Daisy and Mack before attacking Olshenko and Hunter, but it dissipates when Morse kills Androvich, after which she and Hunter are arrested by Olshenko's bodyguards while the other agents escape.

In the present, Morse and Hunter deny their involvement with S.H.I.E.L.D., claiming they were on vacation and became caught up in events by accident, sticking to their story even when Phil Coulson offers to extract them, as they are determined to protect their friends and prevent war. Insisting S.H.I.E.L.D. no longer exists, President Matthew Ellis and Coulson (posing as an Advanced Threat Containment Unit (ATCU) consultant) convince Olshenko not to execute Morse and Hunter, on the condition that they never work for the U.S. government again. Morse and Hunter are released, but can have no further contact with S.H.I.E.L.D. The couple debate what to do next in a bar, aware they will be followed by both US and Russian agents. They notice Coulson, May, Mack, Daisy, Leo Fitz and Jemma Simmons watching them, and the agents share a silent farewell, drinking "parting shots".

In an end tag, Malick meets with his daughter Stephanie, also a Hydra agent, and updates her on the failure of the Russian Inhuman facility and the status of the ancient Inhuman.

== Production ==
=== Development ===
In March 2016, Marvel announced that the thirteenth episode of the season would be titled "Parting Shot", to be written by co-executive producer Paul Zbyszewski, with Michael Zinberg directing. After the twelfth episode, "The Inside Man", set up the characters of Bobbi Morse and Lance Hunter for an apparent solo mission in "Parting Shot", it was asked if this was leading to the potential Agents of S.H.I.E.L.D. spin-off Marvel's Most Wanted (which would star Adrianne Palicki and Nick Blood as those characters, respectively, if ever made), to which executive producer Jeffrey Bell stated, "while they're on S.H.I.E.L.D., we want to take advantage of who they are, and give the audience as much of their relationship with one another, and with other people, as possible. We are aware that there is a potential imminent end, and so they won't be neglected."

=== Writing ===
Hunter and Morse are ultimately written off the series in "Parting Shot", both leaving S.H.I.E.L.D., as Palicki and Blood "physically had to go leave to shoot the pilot [of Most Wanted]," Bell explained, "They had to stop being on S.H.I.E.L.D. and get ready for the pilot and then shoot the pilot and all of that, so it didn't make sense for us to have all these episodes [of Agents of S.H.I.E.L.D.] with them and then not have them in two or three episodes, and then go, "Oh, we were just over here," and then come back and go away again." On the final scene in which the main cast silently farewell Morse and Hunter, Bell said, "When Paul [Zbyszewski] was pitching it in the room, he was getting choked up, we were in the room getting choked up, and then we all read it and we got choked up. At the table read, where everyone is saying goodbye, everyone is getting choked up there and...then on the day at the bar that we shot at, everybody was a mess. For [Palicki and Blood], they were also leaving to go shoot the pilot. It wasn't just a pretend thing; these were people who had worked together for a couple of years and see each other every day and formed relationships."

=== Casting ===
In March 2016, Marvel revealed that main cast members Clark Gregg, Ming-Na Wen, Brett Dalton, Chloe Bennet, Iain De Caestecker, Elizabeth Henstridge, Nick Blood, Adrianne Palicki, Henry Simmons, and Luke Mitchell would star as Phil Coulson, Melinda May, Grant Ward, Daisy Johnson, Leo Fitz, Jemma Simmons, Lance Hunter, Bobbi Morse, Alphonso "Mack" Mackenzie, and Lincoln Campbell, respectively. It was also revealed that the guest cast for the episode would include Powers Boothe as Gideon Malick, William Sadler as President Matthew Ellis, Ravil Isyanov as Anton Petrov, Kristof Konrad as General Androvich, Ivo Nandi as Inspector Duval, Bethany Joy Lenz as Stephanie Malick, Endre Hules as Prime Minister Olshenko, Julia Aks as waitress, Roman Varshavsky as FSO agent and Vladimir Orlov as Russian soldier. Konrad, Aks, Varshavsky, and Orlov did not receive guest star credit in the episode. Boothe, Sadler, and Isyanov reprise their roles from earlier in the series. Despite being credited, Dalton and Mitchell did not ultimately appear.

== Broadcast ==
"Parting Shot" was first aired in the United States on ABC on March 22, 2016.

== Reception ==
=== Ratings ===
In the United States the episode received a 0.9/3 percent share among adults between the ages of 18 and 49, meaning that it was seen by 0.9 percent of all households, and 3 percent of all of those watching television at the time of the broadcast. It was watched by 2.88 million viewers.

=== Accolades ===
Palicki was named as an honorable mention for TVLine's "Performer of the Week" for the week of March 20, 2016, for her performance in this episode.
