= Fallen (miniseries) =

- Promotional poster
- Based on: The Fallen by Tom Sniegoski
- Screenplay by: Sara B. Cooper
- Story by: Tim Huddleston
- Directed by: Mikael Salomon; Kevin Kerslake
- Starring: Paul Wesley; Chelah Horsdal; Fernanda Andrade; Rick Worthy; Hal Ozsan; Will Yun Lee; Tom Skerritt; Elizabeth Lackey; Bryan Cranston; Peter Williams
- Music by: Joel J. Richard
- Country of origin: United States
- Original language: English

Production
- Producers: Jay Sanders/Peter Donaldson Edward Bates; Rochelle Bates; Ron McLeod; Patti Allen
- Cinematography: Jon Joffin
- Editor: Alan Cody
- Running time: Part 1: 84 minutes Part 2: 83 minutes Part 3: 80 minutes Total: 247 minutes
- Production companies: Disney Television Studios; Three Angels Productions
- Budget: $7,000,000

Original release
- Network: ABC Family
- Release: July 23, 2006 – August 5, 2007

Fallen is a 2006 ABC Family miniseries based on The Fallen series of novels by Thomas Sniegoski, and broken into three parts. The first part was originally advertised as an "ABC Family Original Movie", but nearly a year later, it was followed up with two other parts of equal length over the course of a weekend. Fallen stars Paul Wesley as Aaron Corbett, a good-natured high school student who discovers he is a Nephilim, human-angel hybrid. An alternate reality game advertising the series won a Primetime Emmy Award for Outstanding Interactive Program.

== Summary ==
On Aaron Corbett's 18th birthday, he begins exhibiting strange abilities, such as the ability to talk to animals. It is revealed that Aaron is the Redeemer of prophecy, a Nephil with the ability to redeem the fallen angels and return them to Heaven. Aaron leaves his adopted family and spends the next year traveling the world with the angel Camael in order to fulfill his destiny.

A fallen angel known as Azazel is released from his prison by a shadowy figure, who enlists his help in "aiding the Redeemer in fulfilling his destiny." Camael, having been wounded in a battle with the Powers, is put into a trance in order for him to heal, giving Aaron the freedom to do what he wishes. Aaron visits a nearby college, where he discovers an obsessive professor who has captured a Nephil, who turns out to be Aaron's old high school crush Vilma Rodriguez. Aaron rescues Vilma, but inadvertently alerts the Powers to his whereabouts. Camael arrives to defend Aaron and Vilma from Mazarin, the leader of the Powers, and his forces, but is captured. Aaron and Vilma are saved by Azazel. Azazel leads them underground and falsely tells them that Camael is dead.

Camael tries desperately to reveal the truth that Aaron is a part of the Creator's divine plan, but Mazarin refuses to listen and cuts Camael's wings off as punishment. Aaron begins doubting himself, and Azazel tells him of a man known as "the Light Bringer", who made the initial prophecy of the Redeemer and could help quell his suspicions that his abilities are somehow wrong. When Aaron discovers that the fallen do not have long to live, he gives in and redeems Anane, once again alerting the Powers. Refusing to run, Aaron decides to face them, even if it means his death.

Aaron and Azazel defeat the Powers, and force Mazarin and his second-in-command to leave. Camael returns to Ariel for help. Aaron, Vilma, Gabriel, and Azazel travel up a mountain where the Light Bringer's temple is. Aaron alone ventures inside and it is revealed that the Light Bringer is not only Aaron's true father but Lucifer, the first fallen and leader of the Great Rebellion against God in Heaven. Vilma enters the temple to save Aaron, only to be taken to Hell.

Lucifer tells Aaron that if he redeems him, allowing him to return to Heaven to conquer the Creator, he will release Vilma. Vilma, however, escapes on her own, leading Aaron to the conclusion the only one trapped in Hell is Lucifer. Aaron defeats Lucifer, then escapes in time to redeem Camael. Mazarin finally accepts Aaron as a part of God's plan and refuses to hunt the Nephilim or the Fallen anymore. Mazarin returns Azazel to his prison, while Aaron, Vilma, and Gabriel decide to return home.

== Cast ==
- Paul Wesley as Aaron Corbett
- Chelah Horsdal as Lori Corbett
- Ivana Miličević as Ariel
- Kwesi Ameyaw as Policeman
- Fernanda Andrade as Vilma Rodriguez
- Sharon Canovas as Vilma's cousin
- Stuart Cowan as David Brady
- Doolittle as Gabriel the Talking Dog
- Alex Ferris as Stevie
- Bryan Cranston as Lightbringer / Lucifer Morningstar
- Jesse Hutch as Peter Lockhart
- Jennifer Kitchen as Driver
- Diego Klattenhoff as Nathaniel
- Elizabeth Lackey as Verchiel
- Carmen Lavigne as Zeke's Daughter
- Byron Lawson as Kushiel
- Tom Skerritt as Zeke
- Malcolm Stewart as Dr. Michael Jonas
- Peter Williams as Kolazonta
- Rick Worthy as Camael
- Will Yun Lee as Mazarin
- Hal Ozsan as Azazel
- Ty Olsson as Hawkins
- Christian Vincent as Michael the Archangel
- Natassia Malthe as Gadreel
- Rade Šerbedžija as Prof. Lukas Grasic

== Reception ==
Common Sense Media rated the miniseries four out of five stars, and described Aaron as "a great role model", citing his defending bullied classmates and the respect he shows to his family.

It has also been reviewed in Variety; the Orange County Register, which called it "a tale of action-filled good vs. evil and unintentional heroes"; and Deseret News. In her piece for Variety, Laura Fries wrote that the series is "more mythology than theology" and "heavy on setup" but "follows the books closely in plot, if not detail". While she acknowledged the "obvious" traces of Sniegoski's "affiliation with 'Buffy the Vampire Slayer' (...a reluctant chosen one, a prophecy, a protector of said chosen one)", Fries felt that writer Sara Cooper's script was "big on talk" and lacked "the snappy dialogue that made 'Buffy' both fun and frightening". She commended the series for "delving further into character development than one might expect", and "deftly" addressing "Aaron's unpleasant past...without pity", but opined that its symbolism had been "oversimplified".
