= Fernanda Andrade =

Brazilian-American actress and model

- Born: 8 March 1984 (age 42); São José dos Campos, São Paulo, Brazil
- Occupations: Actress, model, singer
- Years active: 2000–present
- Spouse: Josh James (m. 2017)

Fernanda Andrade (born 8 March 1984) is a Brazilian actress, model and singer based in the United States. She is best known for starring in the 2012 horror film, The Devil Inside as Isabella Rossi, Special Agent Salazar in the 2020 sci-fi action thriller television show Next and for her role in the Marvel Cinematic Universe as Wendy Spector in Moon Knight.

== Biography ==
Andrade was born in São José dos Campos, São Paulo state, but raised in Campinas. Her mother is of Italian and Spanish descent, while her father's ancestry is Portuguese, Spanish and Native Brazilian.

Her father was an engineer who traveled frequently. She moved with her family to the U.S. state of Florida when she was 11-years old when her father accepted a permanent engineering position. The move to the United States proved difficult at first, as her father was the only family member who spoke English at the time.

== Career ==
Andrade became interested in acting and film during high school. She was cast in her first professional role when she was 15 years old, when she appeared in the 2000 HBO biopic, For Love or Country: The Arturo Sandoval Story, which starred Andy García as the Cuban jazz musician, Arturo Sandoval. Andrade played Paloma, Sandoval's daughter-in-law, in the television film.

Andrade moved from Florida to Los Angeles when her agent relocated to Southern California. She appeared in several short films and television series during the 2000s and 2010s, including guest spots on CSI: NY and Law & Order: Los Angeles. In 2006, she starred in the ABC Family miniseries, Fallen.

In 2011, she was cast in a recurring role in season four of Sons of Anarchy.

She remained a relatively unknown actress until the debut of her 2012 horror film, The Devil Inside. The film, which stars Andrade, Simon Quarterman, Evan Helmuth, and Suzan Crowley, was produced on a shoe-string budget, but debuted in January 2012 with $34.5 million to win its opening weekend, beating out Mission: Impossible – Ghost Protocol for the #1 slot at the box office. The film eventually grossed 101.8 million.

In 2016 she was cast as Christina Santos in the pilot episode of the Marvel's Most Wanted, but the series was not picked up by ABC.

In 2017 she was part of another pilot, this time as Mariana Silva in the USA Network show by Blumhouse Productions called Run For Your Life. Although the pilot was not picked up she stayed busy the next few years with reoccurring roles in shows like Here and Now on HBO starring Tim Robbins and Holly Hunter, the hulu original The First starring Sean Penn and NCIS: Los Angeles as Claudia Diaz.

In 2020, she recurred in season two of Narcos: Mexico and was a lead in the FOX limited series Next opposite John Slattery.

In 2022, she portrayed Wendy Spector in the Disney+ mini series Moon Knight, part of the Marvel Cinematic Universe.

== Personal life ==
She is fluent in Portuguese, Spanish and English.

Andrade married musician Josh James from the band Stick to Your Guns in August 2017 in a ceremony in Pala, California and currently resides in Los Angeles.

During the COVID-19 lockdown she started a punk hardcore band called Sorry Fern with her husband. The two recorded an EP at their home where Andrade tracked her vocals in the bathtub. 250 limited cassette tapes were produced and sold with all proceeds going to various Los Angeles mutual aid groups.

== Filmography ==
=== Film ===
Key
†	Denotes films that have not yet been released

Year	Title	Character	Notes
2003	La americanita	Marisol	Short
2007	Kill Quincy Wright	Abby	Short
2009	Why Am I Doing This?	Marianne	
2012	The Devil Inside	Isabella Rossi	
2015	The Beautiful Ones	Eva Romano	Nomination for Best Actress - Monica Vitti Award, Blow-Up International Arthouse Film Festival
2019	Lying and Stealing	Mary Bertring	
2023	Assassin	Olivia	

=== Television ===
Year	Title	Character	Notes
2000	For Love or Country: The Arturo Sandoval Story	Paloma	Television movie
2001	The Suitor	Carmencita	Television movie
2002	CSI: Miami	Elena De Soto	Episode: "Wet Foot/Dry Foot"
2007	Fallen	Vilma Rodriguez	Miniseries
2007	Dicas de um Sedutor		Episode: "Pilot"
2010	CSI: NY	Yvonne	Episode: "Tales from the Undercard"
2010	Undercovers	Pigtails	Episode: "Not Without My Daughter"
2011	Law & Order: Los Angeles	Lucia	Episode: "Hayden Tract"
2011	The Glades	Juliana Amparo	Episode: "Swamp Thing"
2011	Sons of Anarchy	Elyda	2 episodes: "Booster" and "Out"
2011	The Mentalist	Sofia Chavez	Episode: "Where in the World is Carmine O'Brien?"
2013	Red Widow	Eva Ramos	3 episodes
2013	Franklin & Bash	Juliette Morano	Episode: "Captain Johnny"
2014	Scorpion	Rene Munoz	Episode: "Once Bitten, Twice Die"
2014	NCIS	Leticia Gomez	Episode: "Honor Thy Father"
2016	From Dusk till Dawn: The Series	Solaya / Itzpa	Episode: "La Llorona"
2016	Rizzoli & Isles	Jenny Evans	Episode: "Bomb Voyage"
2016	Marvel's Most Wanted	Christina Santos	Unaired pilot episode, series was not ordered by ABC
2018	Here and Now	Carmen Torres	5 episodes
2018	The First	Camila Rodriguez	4 episodes
2020	Narcos: Mexico	Alejandra	2 episodes
2020	NeXt	Shea Salazar	Main cast
2022	Moon Knight	Wendy Spector	Episode: "Asylum"
2022	Let the Right One In	Elizabeth Kane	Recurring
2026	Beef	Sara	2 episodes
