= Marvel's Most Wanted =

Unaired Marvel Television pilot

- Genre: Action; Adventure; Drama; Science fiction; Superhero
- Created by: Jeffrey Bell; Paul Zbyszewski
- Based on: Mockingbird by; Len Wein; Neal Adams; Lance Hunter by; Gary Friedrich; Herb Trimpe
- Written by: Jeffrey Bell; Paul Zbyszewski
- Directed by: Billy Gierhart
- Starring: Adrianne Palicki; Nick Blood; Delroy Lindo; Fernanda Andrade; Oded Fehr
- Country of origin: United States
- Original language: English

Production
- Executive producers: Jeffrey Bell; Paul Zbyszewski; Jeph Loeb; Jim Chory
- Production companies: ABC Studios; Marvel Television

Original release
- Network: ABC

Related
- Agents of S.H.I.E.L.D.; Marvel Cinematic Universe television series

Marvel's Most Wanted is an unaired American television pilot created by Jeffrey Bell and Paul Zbyszewski for ABC, based on the Marvel Comics characters Bobbi Morse and Lance Hunter. It is set in the Marvel Cinematic Universe (MCU) and acknowledges the continuity of the franchise's films and other television series. A spin-off from Agents of S.H.I.E.L.D., the pilot was written by Bell and Zbyszewski, and directed by Billy Gierhart.

The pilot revolves around the characters of Bobbi Morse and Lance Hunter, ex-S.H.I.E.L.D. agents and ex-spouses on the run, with Adrianne Palicki and Nick Blood reprising their respective roles of Morse and Hunter from Agents of S.H.I.E.L.D. Delroy Lindo, Fernanda Andrade, and Oded Fehr also starred in the pilot. A television series featuring Morse entered development for ABC Family in July 2011, but never materialized. The character subsequently appeared in the second season of Agents of S.H.I.E.L.D. along with Hunter, and plans for a spin-off centered on the duo, with Palicki and Blood attached, began in April 2015. The series would have been based on storylines occurring at the end of that second season, but ABC passed on the project.

In August 2015, the series was reinvented as Marvel's Most Wanted and received a pilot order from ABC. The cast was filled out in early 2016, and production was completed by late March. The episode was co-produced by ABC Studios and Marvel Television. In May 2016, ABC announced that it would not pick up the pilot to series, and would look to develop other series with Marvel instead.

== Premise ==
Ex-spies and ex-spouses Bobbi Morse and Lance Hunter are on the run, trying to uncover a conspiracy against them. With no help from S.H.I.E.L.D., the peacekeeping and spy agency that previously employed them, they enter into an uneasy partnership with rogue adventurer Dominic Fortune and his niece Christina Santos.

== Cast and characters ==
=== Main ===
- Adrianne Palicki as Bobbi Morse:
  Hunter's ex-wife and a former agent of S.H.I.E.L.D., who Palicki felt "believes in the universe and things happening for a reason". Palicki knew of the comics version of the character, but said that the writers put "their own spin" on the MCU version.
- Nick Blood as Lance Hunter:
  Morse's ex-husband, a former mercenary and agent of S.H.I.E.L.D., who is "a bit of an outsider" and unsure of his loyalties according to Blood. Palicki added that Hunter "believes that you make things happen yourself".
- Delroy Lindo as Dominic Fortune: A "rogue adventurer with a wealth of resources" who agrees to protect Morse and Hunter.
- Fernanda Andrade as Christina Santos:
  A "tough-as-nails woman of mystery" and Fortune's niece. She helps Fortune aide Morse and Hunter while furthering their own agenda. Santos has a history with Hunter that would have been explored throughout the series, with Andrade adding that she has "special skills. She just kind of knows how to work things, like weapons and cars."
- Oded Fehr as a "well-known character" from the comics, who exudes a "villainous charm" and is "a force to be reckoned with" for Morse and Hunter.

=== Guests ===
- Mckenna Grace as Zoe Abel
- Laura Allen as Olivia
- Damon Dayoub

== Production ==
=== Development ===
At the 2011 San Diego Comic-Con, head of Marvel Television Jeph Loeb announced the series Mockingbird was in development at ABC Family. The series, which was described as "Alias meets Felicity", would feature Bobbi Morse as a freshman science major at "a prestigious university in the Silicon Valley... [until h]er life changes when she is recruited by S.H.I.E.L.D. and is forced to become a student by day and a super spy by night." By March 2012, Mockingbird was still in development, with Loeb saying, "as with anything that you're doing, particularly when you're starting up a brand new entity [like Marvel Television], things take time, and we want to make sure we get it right."

At the 2014 San Diego Comic-Con, Morse was revealed to be appearing in the second season of Agents of S.H.I.E.L.D., while Nick Blood was announced as cast in the role of Lance Hunter, a series regular for the season. In August 2014, Adrianne Palicki was cast as Morse in a guest role, and later promoted to series regular with the season two episode "Aftershocks". When joining Agents of S.H.I.E.L.D., it was discussed with Palicki that her character would appear in the Marvel Cinematic Universe films or a spin-off series. By April 2015, Marvel was developing a spin-off series focused on those characters with Agents of S.H.I.E.L.D. showrunner Jeffrey Bell and writer Paul Zbyszewski. The spin-off would be based on storylines occurring at the end of the second season of Agents of S.H.I.E.L.D., and would receive its own pilot rather than a backdoor pilot. Palicki and Blood were in final discussions to headline the potential new series, but ABC passed on the project by May 7, 2015, when they announced their series renewals, cancellations, and pickups. ABC entertainment president Paul Lee explained, "We thought the right thing now is to leave [Palicki and Blood] on S.H.I.E.L.D., because S.H.I.E.L.D. is so strong on [sic] the moment", though he did not rule out returning to the spin-off in the future.

Blood and Palicki returned as principal cast members for the third season of Agents of S.H.I.E.L.D. In August 2015, the spin-off series received new life, reworked as Marvel's Most Wanted and given a pilot order. Bell and Zbyszewski were again developing the series, writing the pilot and executive producing. The pair were set to serve as showrunners for the series if it was picked up. Loeb and Jim Chory were also attached as executive producers. The series would still focus on Morse and Hunter, with Palicki and Blood both attached, and was described as "a new take focusing on the same duo and their continuing adventures." In January 2016, Lee stated that the pilot was "absolutely" moving forward, praising the script and saying production would begin "in the next few months." In the Agents of S.H.I.E.L.D. episode "Parting Shot", the two characters were written off that series, having them leave and disavow S.H.I.E.L.D. Bell explained that Palicki and Blood had to leave to film the pilot, and "it didn't make sense" to have the story explain their absence for several episodes just to have the pair leave again soon after to begin production on the rest of Marvel's Most Wanted if it was picked up to series.

=== Writing ===
With S.H.I.E.L.D., there's more of a clear line between the good guys and the bad guys and between protocol and going off grid. Whereas in the Most Wanted world, it's all shades of gray, and judgment calls have to be made.

— Nick Blood on the different moral code of the spin-off.

Bell compared Marvel's Most Wanted to the Buffy the Vampire Slayer spin-off Angel, saying the series would be more intimate than Agents of S.H.I.E.L.D. because at the heart of the series would be the question, "What's the metaphor of the relationship that's going to dramatize over the course of the episode versus the larger machinations of the world that S.H.I.E.L.D. [is] in?" Palicki said the pilot is less based in Marvel mythology and more focused on the two characters, whose dynamic she compared to Mr. and Mrs. Smith. Blood added, "It's exploring how you make a relationship work with the backdrop of all this crazy stuff that goes on" in their world.

Bell and Zbyszewski worked together on Morse and Hunter's storyline for the third season of Agents of S.H.I.E.L.D., preparing them to move over to the spin-off, with Bell explaining that it would set up Marvel's Most Wanted by defining exactly who the characters are, such as Hunter and his lack of loyalty to S.H.I.E.L.D. and to ideologies—"nothing specific about the show, it's just who Hunter is." Blood noted that Hunter is "willing to ignore the rules and regulations to get the right thing done. Sometimes, Bobbi needs that kick up the backside to send her in that direction. By the same token, Hunter needs Bobbi's rationale sometimes to make sure he doesn't get in trouble again." Bell added that for Hunter, "laws are kind of suggestions, and if he's with them he'll follow them, and he's always been much more a loyalist to the guy in the trenches than to any ideology". Palicki remarked that the differences in the character's views and beliefs would be "a big through line throughout the entire show", and that having Morse and Hunter work for Fortune would test both of their morals, with Hunter having "a bit more experience with that, where the line to cross is a bit fluid. It might take Bobbi a bit more to adapt to that." Palicki also thought the pilot was "a little darker [and] grittier" than Agents of S.H.I.E.L.D.

=== Casting ===
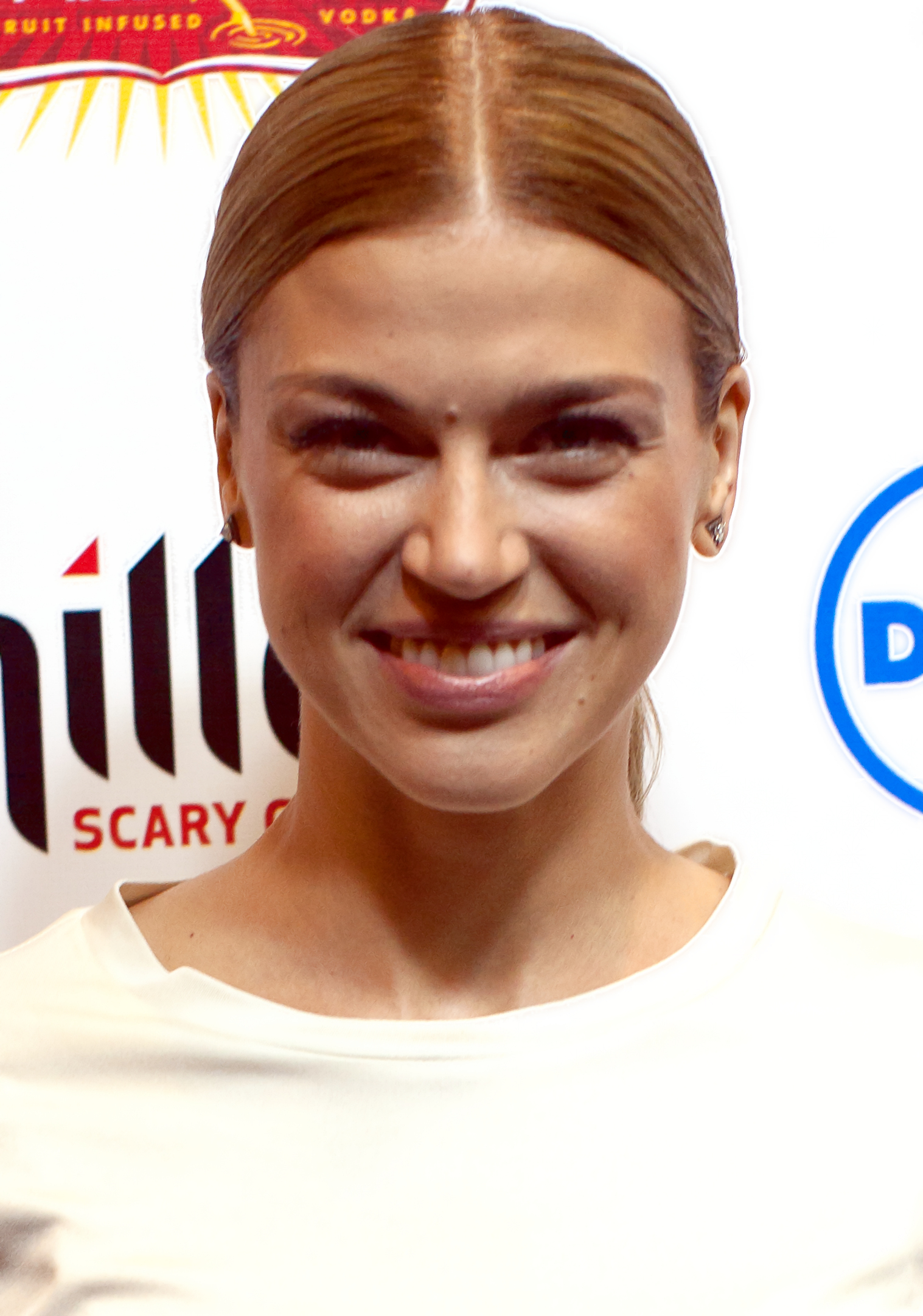
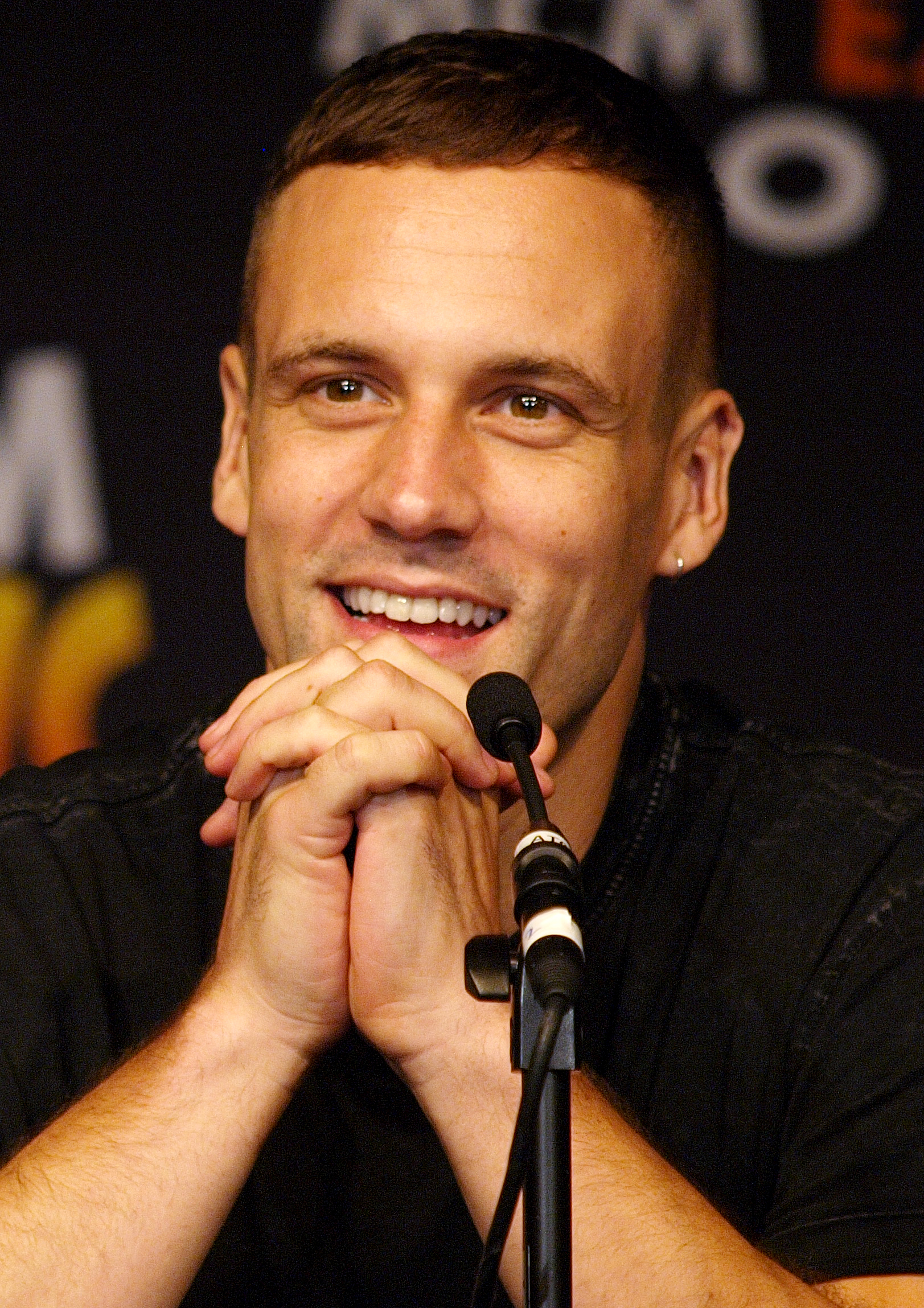
Adrianne Palicki and Nick Blood reprise their roles from Agents of S.H.I.E.L.D., Bobbi Morse and Lance Hunter respectively.

In August 2015, Palicki and Blood were attached to Marvel's Most Wanted with the pilot order, reprising their Agents of S.H.I.E.L.D. roles as Bobbi Morse and Lance Hunter, respectively. In January 2016, Delroy Lindo was cast as "rogue adventurer" Dominic Fortune. That March, Oded Fehr and Fernanda Andrade were also cast in the pilot, as a "well-known character" from the comics and Fortune's niece Christina Santos, respectively. Additionally, guest stars for the pilot include Mckenna Grace as Zoe Abel, Laura Allen as Olivia, and Damon Dayoub.

=== Filming ===
Filming on the pilot took place in early 2016, with Billy Gierhart directing. Production began following that of the Agents of S.H.I.E.L.D. episode "Parting Shot", and was completed by late March. William O. Hunter, who worked on Marvel's The Avengers, served as production designer, with Christine Bieselin Clark as costume designer.

=== Marvel Cinematic Universe tie-ins ===
On potential crossovers with Agents of S.H.I.E.L.D., Bell said in March 2016, in reference to the way Hunter and Morse were written off of that series, "We want to be clear we're telling a different type of story, and in doing so, you don't want to be telling a story where you go, "Why don't they call Coulson? He can fix this easily," because that line's been cut. Not that you can't bring them back someday or have someone from S.H.I.E.L.D. show up on this show, but it's really setting up a different [part of the] universe". Blood described the situation as "they're on their own, they can make up their own rules, just turn the phones on airplane mode and ignore the calls from back home".

== No pick-up and future ==
In April 2016, Marvel's Most Wanted was seen to be "a no-brainer" for a series pick-up by industry insiders. However, in early May it was said to be "cooling" and "not considered the lock it once was". At that time, the producers were prepping "if-come" orders, "deals with writers that will come into effect in the event a pilot is picked [up] to series". On May 12, 2016, the pilot was passed on by ABC, with Lee's successor Channing Dungey explaining that Marvel's Most Wanted "did not feel as strong as some of the other pilots that we shot. We talked about it with Marvel and we all came to an agreement that we want to figure out what the next show is that we do together, is something that we all feel is as creatively strong as it can be." However, Dungey said that ABC was open to the series being shopped to another network if Marvel found "another home" for it. Loeb also acknowledged this possibility, but said that the series was designed "to do a very specific thing" alongside S.H.I.E.L.D. on ABC. In June 2018, Loeb indicated that Marvel could not release the pilot, as any potential release was controlled by ABC.

== See also ==
- List of unproduced Marvel Comics adaptations
