= Al MacKenzie =

Publication information
- Publisher: Marvel Comics
- First appearance: Nick Fury vs. S.H.I.E.L.D. #3 (Aug. 1988)
- Created by: Bob Harras (writer); Paul Neary (artist)

In-story information
- Alter ego: Alphonso MacKenzie
- Team affiliations: S.H.I.E.L.D. C.I.A.

Al MacKenzie is a fictional character appearing in American comic books published by Marvel Comics.

Al MacKenzie appeared in the Marvel Cinematic Universe (MCU) television series Agents of S.H.I.E.L.D., portrayed by Henry Simmons. After briefly becoming the host of Spirit of Vengeance, he eventually became the new director of S.H.I.E.L.D.

== Publication history ==
Al MacKenzie first appeared in Nick Fury vs. S.H.I.E.L.D. #3 (Aug. 1988), and was created by Bob Harras and Paul Neary.

The character subsequently appears in Nick Fury, Agent of S.H.I.E.L.D. #1–7 (Sept. 1989–Jan. 1990).

MacKenzie appears in the reference series The Official Handbook of the Marvel Universe Update '89.

== Fictional character biography ==
Al MacKenzie was born in Austin, Texas. He was once the C.I.A. liaison to S.H.I.E.L.D. He became romantically involved with Valentina Allegra de Fontaine, which led to an estrangement between him and Nick Fury. Because of this, he returned to the CIA.

After leaving S.H.I.E.L.D., MacKenzie writes UnSHIELDed: an Unauthorized Insider's Look Behind the World's Most Powerful Global Spy Network, an informational book about the history of S.H.I.E.L.D.

== In other media ==
Henry Simmons as Alphonso Mackenzie in Agents of S.H.I.E.L.D.

Alphonso Mackenzie appears in Agents of S.H.I.E.L.D., portrayed by Henry Simmons. This version is an African-American mechanic and engineer who was recruited into S.H.I.E.L.D. by Phil Coulson. Mack later goes on to become the director of S.H.I.E.L.D due to the ill health and subsequent death of Coulson.

Simmons reprises his role in the web series Agents of S.H.I.E.L.D.: Slingshot.
