= Luke Mitchell =

Australian actor (born 1985)

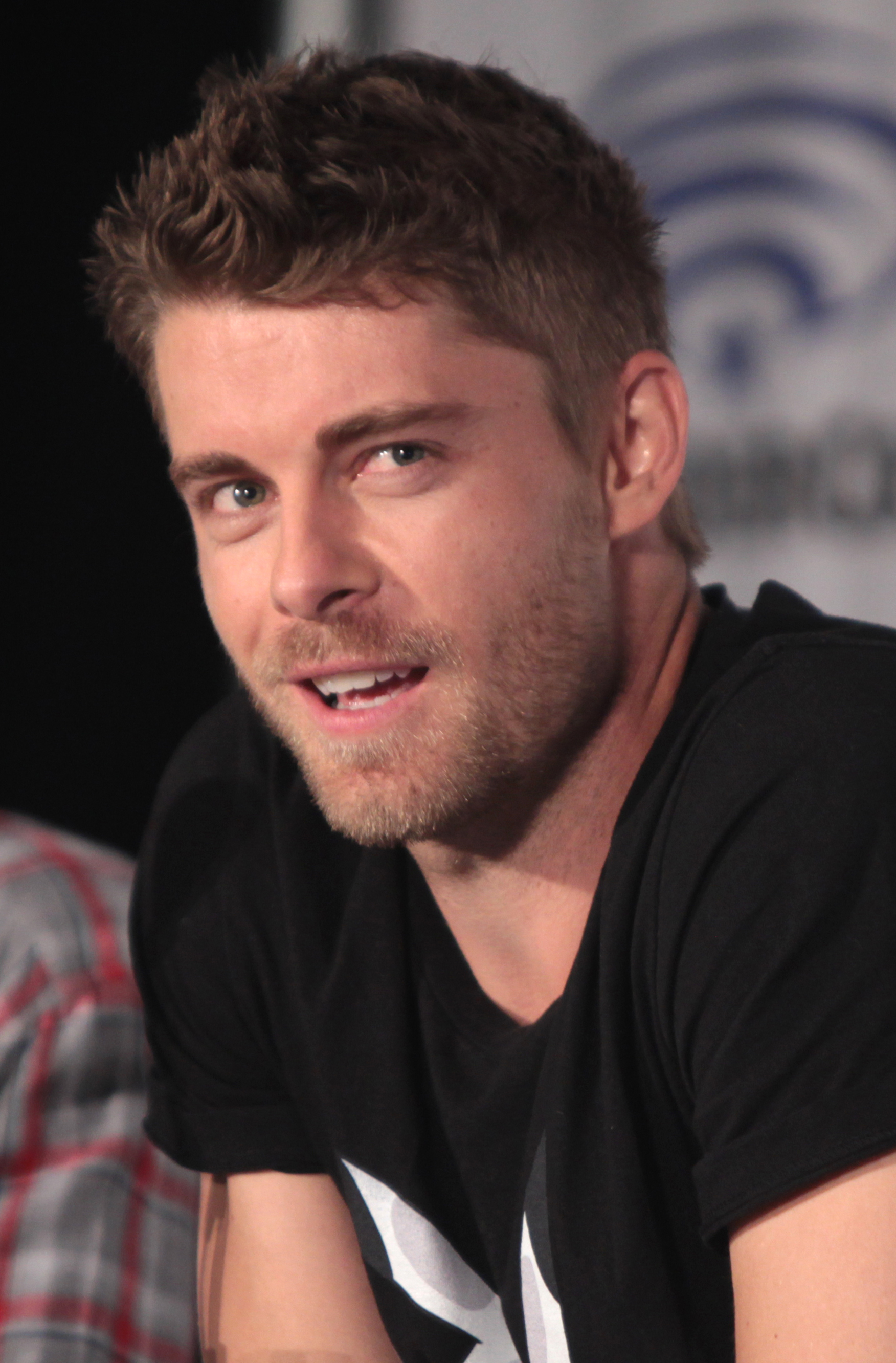
- Mitchell in 2016
- Born: 17 April 1985 (age 41); Gold Coast, Queensland, Australia
- Occupation: Actor
- Years active: 2008–present
- Spouse: Rebecca Breeds (m. 2013)
- Children: 1

Luke Mitchell (born 17 April 1985) is an Australian actor. He attended the Film and Television Studio International, and won the role of Chris Knight in Neighbours in 2008. Mitchell appeared as Will in the third season of H_{2}O: Just Add Water in 2009. He starred as Romeo Smith in Home and Away from 2009 to 2013. The role saw Mitchell win the Most Popular New Male Talent Logie Award in 2010.

In 2013, he starred as John Young in the CW's The Tomorrow People. In 2015, he joined the cast of Agents of S.H.I.E.L.D. for the series' second season, playing the recurring character of Inhuman Lincoln Campbell, before being promoted to series regular for its third season. He joined NBC's Blindspot as a series regular during its second season in 2016, playing Roman.

== Early life ==
Mitchell was born on 17 April 1985 and grew up on the Gold Coast. His parents later divorced and both went on to remarry. Mitchell has three brothers, Michael, Daniel and Benjamin and a younger sister, Bree. His older brother coaches tennis, while his younger brother, Ben, was in the top 10 of Australian Tennis Players and peaked at 109 in the world rankings. Mitchell played tennis from the age of five to nineteen. He aimed to go professional, but gave it up after realizing it was the only thing in his life. Mitchell attended Nerang State High School.

== Career ==
Mitchell trained at the Film and Television Studio International and worked with professionals such as Joss McWilliam, Iain Gardner, Kim Krejus and Dean Carey. He travelled around Australia with international entertainment company Sudden Impact Entertainment and worked in their live theatre shows.

Whilst working in Melbourne he successfully auditioned for the guest-role of Chris Knight in Neighbours and appeared in 11 episodes. He then moved back to the Gold Coast to play the part of Will in the third season of H_{2}O: Just Add Water. In 2008, Mitchell filmed the gay-themed romance Performance Anxiety, which was selected as part of the 9th Annual Brisbane Queer Film Festival as a screening for cast and crew.

In June 2009, Mitchell relocated to Sydney and began starring as Romeo Smith in Home and Away. Mitchell won the 2010 Logie Award for Most Popular New Male Talent for his portrayal of Romeo. On 4 November 2012, it was announced that Mitchell had chosen to leave Home and Away after four years and his character departed on-screen in 2013. Following his departure from Home and Away, Mitchell was cast as John Young in The CW's remake of Tomorrow People in February 2013. In July 2014, it was announced that Mitchell had joined the cast of US series Members Only playing Jesse. However, the series was cancelled before the pilot aired.

In February 2015, Mitchell joined Agents of S.H.I.E.L.D. as Lincoln Campbell, a charismatic Inhuman; he was promoted to the main cast for season three of the show. After leaving Agents of S.H.I.E.L.D., Mitchell was cast as Roman in Blindspot. He initially turned down the audition, as he did not think he was right for the role. Upon returning to the United States, Mitchell learned that he was still wanted for the part and he sent in an audition tape. He asked if he could keep his beard and producers agreed.

In August 2018, Mitchell was cast in the lead role of Captain John "Abe" Abraham in the CBS drama The Code. He took over the role from Dave Annable, who played the character in the pilot episode. The series was cancelled after one season. Mitchell plays Rowdy in Without Remorse, a 2021 film adaptation of Tom Clancy's 1993 novel of the same name, alongside Michael B. Jordan. Mitchell played the lead role of Danny in The CW drama The Republic of Sarah which was written by Jeffrey Paul King. The series was green lit by The CW on 12 May 2020 for the 2020–2021 television season. In September 2021, The Republic of Sarah was cancelled after one season. In April 2022, he was cast in the role of Ken, the King of the Gods, in the fourth and final season for the CW drama Legacies.

Mitchell also joined the cast of Big Sky for its third season as Sunny Barnes' (Reba McEntire) son Cormac. In 2023, he played Russ in the Hallmark Channel television film A Pinch of Portugal, alongside Heather Hemmens. Mitchell made several appearances as a guest star in the ninth season of Chicago Med as ED doctor Mitch Ripley. His role is expanded in Season 10.

== Personal life ==
Mitchell once shared a house with his H_{2}O: Just Add Water co-stars Burgess Abernethy, Phoebe Tonkin and Cariba Heine. During a TV Week interview, Mitchell revealed that his interests were body boarding, nature and going to the movies.

In 2009, Mitchell began dating his Home and Away co-star Rebecca Breeds. The couple announced their engagement in May 2012 and married in January 2013. In November 2024, Breeds announced she and Mitchell were expecting their first child, and they announced the birth of their son on 20 February 2025.

== Filmography ==
=== Film ===
Year	Title	Role	Notes
2008	Performance Anxiety	Peter Koliat	
2010	Cryptopticon	Y	
2015	7 Minutes	Sam	
2016	Mothers and Daughters	Nelson Quinn	
2020	Black Water: Abyss	Eric	
2021	Without Remorse	Rowdy	
2023	A Pinch of Portugal	Russ	TV movie

=== Television ===
Year	Title	Role	Notes
2008	Neighbours	Chris Knight	Season 24 (recurring role, 11 episodes)
2009–2010	H_{2}O: Just Add Water	Will Benjamin	Season 3 (main role, 26 episodes)
2009–2013	Home and Away	Romeo Smith	Seasons 22–26 (main role, 673 episodes)
2013–2014	The Tomorrow People	John Young	Season 1 (main role, 22 episodes)
2015	Members Only	Jesse	Unaired TV pilot (ABC)
2015–2016	Agents of S.H.I.E.L.D.	Lincoln Campbell	Season 2 (recurring role, 7 episodes); Season 3 (main role, 22 episodes)
2016	Agents of S.H.I.E.L.D.: Academy	Himself	Episodes: "Inhuman Adaptation", "Commencement"
2016–2020	Blindspot	Roman	Seasons 2–3 (main role, 44 episodes); Season 4 (recurring role, 7 episodes); Season 5 (guest role, 1 episode)
2019	The Code	Captain John "Abe" Abraham	Season 1 (main role, 12 episodes)
2021	The Republic of Sarah	Danny Cooper	Season 1 (main role, 13 episodes)
2022	Legacies	Ken	Season 4 (recurring role, 5 episodes)
2022–2023	Big Sky	Cormac Barnes	Season 3 (recurring role, 13 episodes)
2024–present	Chicago Med	Dr. Mitch Ripley	Seasons 9–present (main role, 23+ episodes)

== Awards and nominations ==
Year	Award	Category	Result	Refs
2010	Logie Award	Most Popular New Male Talent	Won	
