= Henry Simmons =

American actor

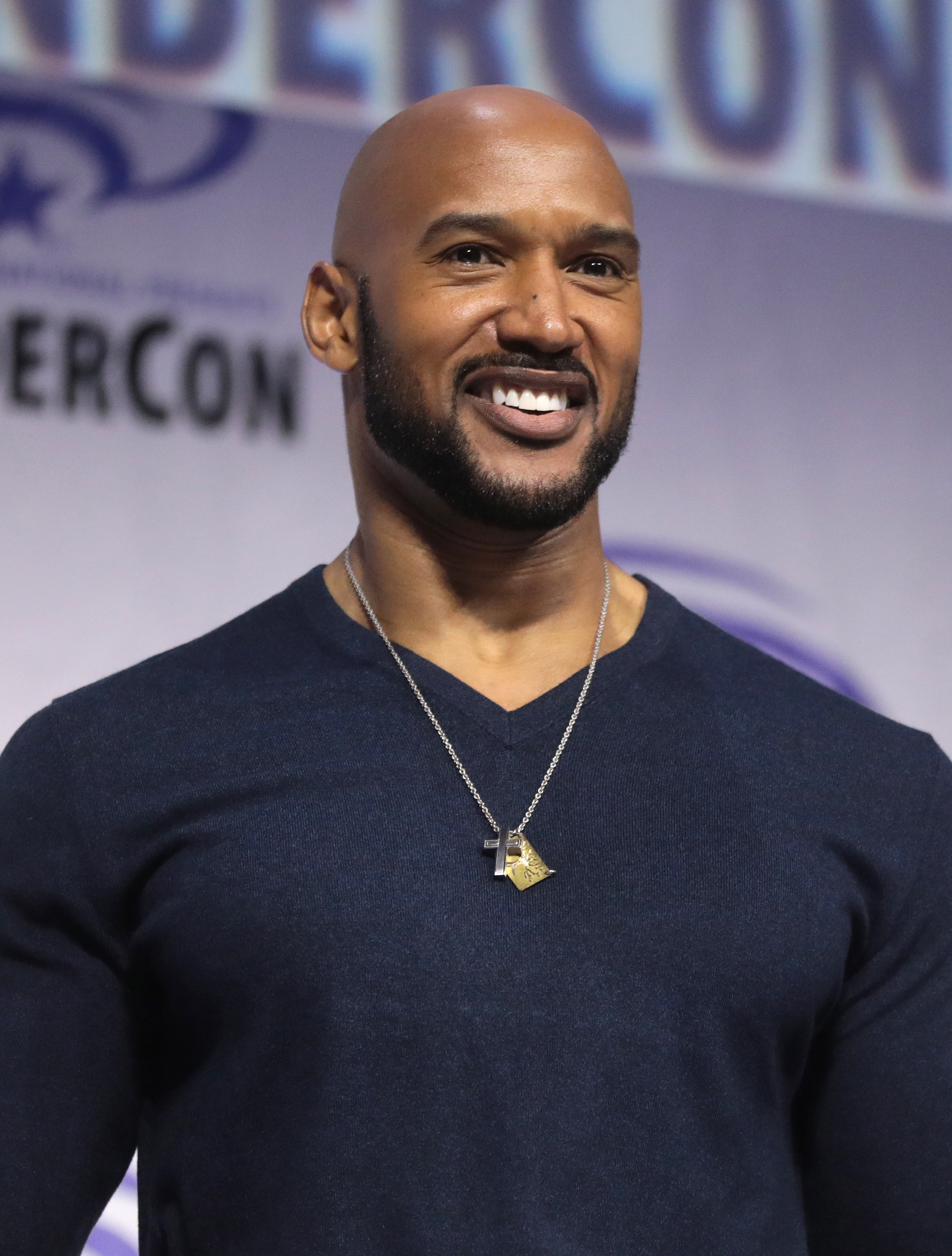
- Simmons in 2019
- Born: Henry Oswald Simmons; July 1, 1970 (age 56); Stamford, Connecticut, U.S.
- Education: Franklin Pierce University
- Occupation: Actor
- Years active: 1994–present
- Spouse: Sophina Brown (m. 2010)

Henry Oswald Simmons (born July 1, 1970) is an American actor. He is known for portraying Alphonso "Mack" Mackenzie in the ABC superhero drama series Agents of S.H.I.E.L.D. (2014–2020) and Baldwin Jones in the ABC police drama series NYPD Blue (2000–2005).

== Early life and education ==
Simmons was born in Stamford, Connecticut. He is the son of Aurelia, a school teacher, and Henry Simmons Sr., an IRS Revenue Officer. He is one of three children, including his twin sister, and another sister. Simmons earned a basketball scholarship to Franklin Pierce University, where he earned a business degree.

While attending Franklin Pierce University, he experimented in theater. After graduating from college, he briefly worked at a Fortune 500 company in Stamford. Unhappy with his job, Simmons moved to New York City and began to study acting and after a few bit roles, he landed a recurring role on the soap opera Another World.

== Career ==
Simmons played Detective Baldwin Jones on the ABC drama NYPD Blue for six seasons. He had a leading role in the CBS legal drama Shark, a leading role in World's Greatest Dad, and the ABC-TV comedy series Man Up!

His film work includes the 2004 action/comedy film Taxi, From the Rough, and 2014's No Good Deed.

Simmons won the Grand Jury Award for Best Actor at the American Black Film Festival, for his portrayal of Dr. Walter Chambers in the 2007 film South of Pico.

From 2014 to 2020, Simmons starred in the ABC superhero drama series Agents of S.H.I.E.L.D., portraying S.H.I.E.L.D. Director Alphonso "Mack" Mackenzie. After being a recurring character in the second season, he was promoted to a series regular for season 3, and for all remaining seasons.

In 2021, he starred as the lead in the Ava DuVernay series, Cherish the Day.

Next, he will star in the MGM+ drama series, Emperor of Ocean Park, with Forest Whitaker.

== Personal life ==
Simmons married actress Sophina Brown in May 2010.

== Filmography ==
=== Film ===
Film roles
Year	Title	Role	Notes
1994	Above the Rim	Starnes	
1995	Coincidents	Tiger	Short
1997	13 Bourbon St.	-	
1999	On the Q.T.	Peter	
1999	Let It Snow	Mitch Jennings	
2001	On the Q.T.	Peter	
2002	A Gentleman's Game	Walter Kane	
2004	Taxi	Jesse	
2005	Are We There Yet?	Carl	
2005	Lackawanna Blues	Jesse	TV movie
2006	Something New	Kyle	
2006	Madea's Family Reunion	Issac	
2006	The Insurgents	Marcus	
2007	South of Pico	Dr. Walter Chambers	
2009	World's Greatest Dad	Mike Lane	
2009	Georgia O'Keeffe	Jean Toomer	TV movie
2011	From the Rough	Kendrick Paulsen Jr.	
2012	Superman vs. The Elite	Efrain Baxter (voice)	Video
2013	Stalkers	Cliff Wagner	TV movie
2014	No Good Deed	Jeffery Granger	
2014	Saint Francis	Peter	TV movie
2015	Two Bellmen	Ivan	Short
2015	Synapse	Agent 805	
2018	Bedtime Story	Therapist	Short

=== Television ===
Television roles
Year	Title	Role	Notes
1994	Saturday Night Live	Johnny	Episode: "Martin Lawrence/Crash Test Dummies"
1994	The Cosby Mysteries	Kevin Lewis	Episode: "Expert Witness"
1994–1995	New York Undercover	Jackson / Trapp	Episode: "The Friendly Neighborhood Dealer" & "High on the Hog"
1997–1999	Another World	Tyrone Montgomery	Regular Cast
2000–2005	NYPD Blue	Detective Baldwin Jones	Main cast: season 7–12
2004	Spartacus	Draba	TV mini series
2006	Pepper Dennis	Curtis Wilson	Recurring cast
2006–2008	Shark	Issac Wright	Main cast
2009	The Cleaner	Bobby Carmichael	Episode: "Standing Eight"
2009	CSI: Miami	Andrew Ballard	Episode: "Point of Impact"
2009	Raising the Bar	Officer Howard	Episode: "Oh, Say Can You Pee"
2011	Let's Stay Together	Mike	Episode: "Daddy's Home"
2011	Man Up	Grant Sweet	Main cast
2012	Common Law	Morgan Watkins	Episode: "The Ex-Factor"
2013	Bones	Tom Molnor	Episode: "The Corpse on the Canopy"
2013	Second Generation Wayans	Baron 'The Truth' Fouse	Recurring cast
2013	Coogan Auto	Louis	Episode: "Guess Who's Coming to Visit"
2013–2014	Ravenswood	Simon Beaumont	Recurring cast
2014	Transparent	Derek	Episode: "Original Pilot"
2014	Reckless	Dr. Charles Briggs	Episode: "And So It Begins"
2014	Law & Order: Special Victims Unit	Shakir Wilkins	Episode: "American Disgrace"
2014–2020	Agents of S.H.I.E.L.D.	Alphonso "Mack" Mackenzie	Recurring cast: season 2, main cast: season 3–7
2016	Agents of S.H.I.E.L.D.: Academy	Himself	Episode: "Skydive Challenge"
2016	Agents of S.H.I.E.L.D.: Slingshot	Alphonso "Mack" Mackenzie	Episode: "Progress"
2022	Dynasty	Kevin	2 episodes
2022	Cherish the Day	Ellis Moran	Main cast
2024	The Emperor of Ocean Park	Addison Garland	Main cast
