= Nick Blood =

English actor (born 1982)

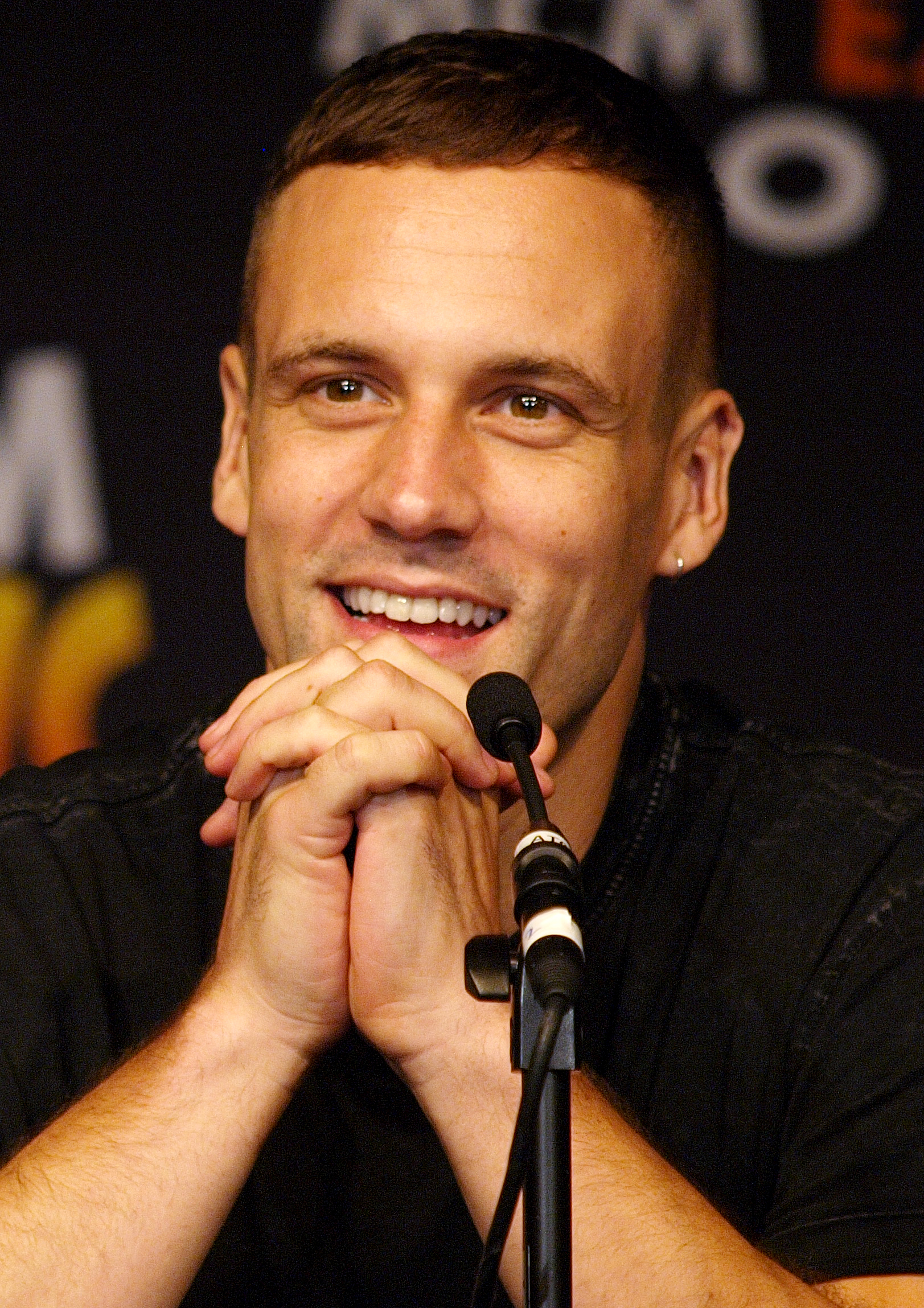
- Blood in 2015
- Born: 20 March 1982 (age 44); Aylesbury, Buckinghamshire, England
- Education: London Academy of Music and Dramatic Art
- Occupation: Actor
- Years active: 2009–present

Nick Blood (born 20 March 1982) is an English actor. He is known for his roles as Kieran in Trollied (2011-2013), Lance Hunter in Agents of S.H.I.E.L.D. (2014-2017), Vincent Pyne in The Day of the Jackal (2024) and as Gus Howard on Euphoria.

== Early life ==
Blood was born in Aylesbury in Buckinghamshire. He joined his local drama club at the age of 7 and soon realised that he wanted to become an actor. Blood went to local Wingrave Church of England Primary School before he was a pupil at Sir Henry Floyd Grammar School in Aylesbury, followed by sixth form at Cedars Upper School for A Levels before attending Bristol University. He found his pathway into acting via the ITV Drama Club. Blood subsequently attended the London Academy of Music and Dramatic Art.

== Career ==
=== Film and television ===
Blood's first acting role came in the 25th series of The Bill in a two-episode story of an armed robbery at a toy shop.

He had a role as Alex, Ali's gay flatmate who works as a designer, in the BBC drama Material Girl (2010).

In 2011, he appeared in the Channel 4 drama Misfits as Jen's boyfriend and coma victim, Dom. In 2011, he was announced to play the role of Kieran, a butcher, in fictitious "Valco" in the Sky1 sitcom Trollied. Blood left the show in the finale of series 3.

In 2012, Blood gained his first feature film role as Davy Famous in Spike Island.

In 2013, he appeared in the final series of BBC Three's Him & Her as Becky's ex-boyfriend, Lee. In 2014, Blood appeared in ITV's mystery drama The Bletchley Circle, as Ben, a police officer. Blood also appeared in the Channel 4 police comedy-satire Babylon. He also provides a voice in the video game Dragon Age: Inquisition. In 2018, he played Adam in the indie thriller, Still.

Blood became a regular on the second season of Marvel's Agents of S.H.I.E.L.D. as Lance Hunter, a mercenary whom Coulson turns to for help and who agrees to join S.H.I.E.L.D. His character is later forced to retire from S.H.I.E.L.D. prior to the season 3 finale. He returned in the season 5 episode "Rewind".

In 2024, he starred as Vincent Pyne, working alongside Eddie Redmayne and Charles Dance in the British spy thriller television series The Day of the Jackal (2024).

=== Theatre ===
In 2009, Blood formed a theatre company called "WE. BUY. GOLD" with his friend at LAMDA, Tom McCall.

WE. BUY. GOLD.'s debut show, Inches Apart, which was co-written and starred Blood, was entered into the Old Vic New Voices Theatre503 Award, which it subsequently won. The Old Vic then produced a full professional production at Theatre503, which ran from 12 May to 13 June 2009.

Blood made his professional stage debut in 2009 in The Priory as Adam, at the Royal Court Theatre which ran from 19 November 2009 to 16 January 2010. In 2010, he went on to perform as Sordido in a modern adaptation of the Jacobean tragedy Women Beware Women at the National Theatre, directed by award-winning Marianne Elliott.

In 2011, he appeared in Backbeat which told the story of the formation and early years of The Beatles. It ran in the Duke of York's Theatre from 10 October 2011 to 18 February 2012, and Blood played the lead role of the "fifth Beatle" Stuart Sutcliffe. Due to the musical nature of the role he has learned to play bass guitar, and also subsequently joined a band, Shaaark. The show was an overwhelming critical success during its West End run. This success took the show to Toronto, Ontario, Canada, from 24 August 2012 to 31 August 2012, for a run of seven days.

== Personal life ==
Blood is a lifelong supporter of Liverpool F.C.

== Filmography ==
=== Film ===
Year	Title	Role	Notes
2012	Spike Island	Dave Famous	
2014	X Moor	Matt	
2014	Between Places	Christian	Short film
2014	Red Lobster	Himself	Short film
2014	Commitment	Tube Male	Short film
2015	Brand New-U	Johan	
2015	Hero	—N/a	Short film Director
2019	Say My Name	Statton	
2023	The Offering	Arthur	
2023	Lovely, Dark, and Deep	Jackson	

=== Television ===
Year	Title	Role	Notes
2009	The Bill	Mick Jones	2 episodes
2010	Material Girl	Alex	Main cast; 6 episodes
2010	Stanley Park	Harry Stevens	Main cast; Pilot
2010	Combat Kids	Paul	Main cast; 3 episodes
2011	Misfits	Dom	Episode #3.5
2011–2013	Trollied	Kieran	Main cast; 26 episodes
2012	Public Enemies	Glen Smithfield	2 episodes
2013	Him & Her	Lee	Recurring cast (series 4); 5 episodes
2014	The Bletchley Circle	Ben Gladstone	Recurring cast (series 2); 4 episodes
2014	Babylon	Warwick	Main cast; 7 episodes
2014–2017	Agents of S.H.I.E.L.D.	Lance Hunter	Main cast (season 2–3), guest star (season 5); 36 episodes
2016	Marvel's Most Wanted	Lance Hunter	TV pilot (unaired)
2019–2022	Euphoria	Gus Howard	Recurring cast (season 1–2); 5 episodes
2020	Strike	Jimmy Knight	Guest cast (series 4); 4 episodes
2021	Close to Me	Thomas	6 episodes
2022	Andor	Corporal Kimzi	2 episodes
2023	Rain Dogs	Mason	2 episodes
2023	Slow Horses	Sturges	4 episodes
2023	The Chemistry of Death	Michael Strachan	
2024	The Day of the Jackal	Vincent Pyne	Main cast; 6 episodes
2024	Joan	Gary	Recurring role; 2 episodes
2026	Hit Point	Leo	Upcoming six-part thriller

=== Video games ===
Year	Title	Role
2014	Dragon Age: Inquisition	Hall the Archer (voice)
2018	Vampyr	Agamemnon, Harry, Lord Hamersley, Pericles, Priwen Guards, Thomas (voices)
2023	Final Fantasy XVI	Tiamut (voice)
