= List of Agents of S.H.I.E.L.D. episodes =

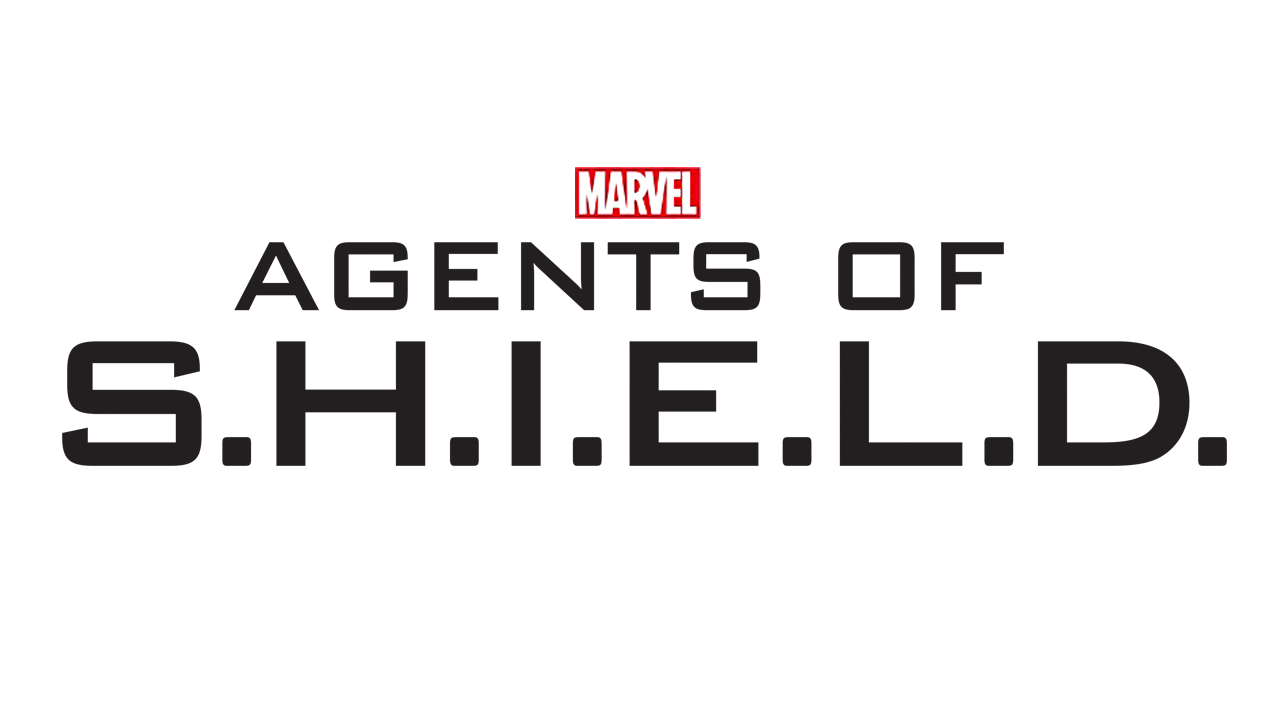

Agents of S.H.I.E.L.D. is an American television series created for ABC by Joss Whedon, Jed Whedon, and Maurissa Tancharoen, based on the Marvel Comics organization S.H.I.E.L.D. It is set in the Marvel Cinematic Universe (MCU) and acknowledges the continuity of the franchise's films and other television series. The series was produced by ABC Studios, Marvel Television, and Mutant Enemy Productions, and sees Clark Gregg reprise his role as Phil Coulson from the film series. During the course of the series, 136 episodes of Agents of S.H.I.E.L.D. aired over seven seasons, between September 24, 2013, and August 12, 2020.

== Series overview ==
Season	Episodes	Originally released		Rank	Average viewers (in millions inc. DVR)
Season	Episodes	First released	Last released	Rank	Average viewers (in millions inc. DVR)
1	22	September 24, 2013	May 13, 2014	43	8.31
2	22	September 23, 2014	May 12, 2015	76	7.09
3	22	September 29, 2015	May 17, 2016	85	5.52
4	22	September 20, 2016	May 16, 2017	110	4.22
5	22	December 1, 2017	May 18, 2018	133	3.57
6	13	May 10, 2019	August 2, 2019	—N/a	—N/a
7	13	May 27, 2020	August 12, 2020	—N/a	—N/a

== Episodes ==
=== Season 1 (2013–14) ===
No. overall	No. in season	Title	Directed by	Written by	Original release date	U.S. viewers (millions)
1	1	"Pilot"	Joss Whedon	Joss Whedon, Jed Whedon & Maurissa Tancharoen	September 24, 2013	12.12
2	2	"0-8-4"	David Straiton	Maurissa Tancharoen, Jed Whedon & Jeffrey Bell	October 1, 2013	8.66
3	3	"The Asset"	Milan Cheylov	Jed Whedon & Maurissa Tancharoen	October 8, 2013	7.87
4	4	"Eye Spy"	Roxann Dawson	Jeffrey Bell	October 15, 2013	7.85
5	5	"Girl in the Flower Dress"	Jesse Bochco	Brent Fletcher	October 22, 2013	7.39
6	6	"FZZT"	Vincent Misiano	Paul Zbyszewski	November 5, 2013	7.15
7	7	"The Hub"	Bobby Roth	Rafe Judkins & Lauren LeFranc	November 12, 2013	6.67
8	8	"The Well"	Jonathan Frakes	Monica Owusu-Breen	November 19, 2013	6.89
9	9	"Repairs"	Billy Gierhart	Maurissa Tancharoen & Jed Whedon	November 26, 2013	9.69
10	10	"The Bridge"	Holly Dale	Shalisha Francis	December 10, 2013	6.11
11	11	"The Magical Place"	Kevin Hooks	Paul Zbyszewski & Brent Fletcher	January 7, 2014	6.63
12	12	"Seeds"	Kenneth Fink	Monica Owusu-Breen & Jed Whedon	January 14, 2014	6.37
13	13	"T.R.A.C.K.S."	Paul Edwards	Lauren LeFranc & Rafe Judkins	February 4, 2014	6.62
14	14	"T.A.H.I.T.I."	Bobby Roth	Jeffrey Bell	March 4, 2014	5.46
15	15	"Yes Men"	John Terlesky	Shalisha Francis	March 11, 2014	5.99
16	16	"End of the Beginning"	Bobby Roth	Paul Zbyszewski	April 1, 2014	5.71
17	17	"Turn, Turn, Turn"	Vincent Misiano	Jed Whedon & Maurissa Tancharoen	April 8, 2014	5.37
18	18	"Providence"	Milan Cheylov	Brent Fletcher	April 15, 2014	5.52
19	19	"The Only Light in the Darkness"	Vincent Misiano	Monica Owusu-Breen	April 22, 2014	6.04
20	20	"Nothing Personal"	Billy Gierhart	Paul Zbyszewski & DJ Doyle	April 29, 2014	5.95
21	21	"Ragtag"	Roxann Dawson	Jeffrey Bell	May 6, 2014	5.37
22	22	"Beginning of the End"	David Straiton	Maurissa Tancharoen & Jed Whedon	May 13, 2014	5.45

=== Season 2 (2014–15) ===
No. overall	No. in season	Title	Directed by	Written by	Original release date	U.S. viewers (millions)
23	1	"Shadows"	Vincent Misiano	Jed Whedon & Maurissa Tancharoen	September 23, 2014	5.98
24	2	"Heavy Is the Head"	Jesse Bochco	Paul Zbyszewski	September 30, 2014	5.05
25	3	"Making Friends and Influencing People"	Bobby Roth	Monica Owusu-Breen	October 7, 2014	4.47
26	4	"Face My Enemy"	Kevin Tancharoen	Drew Z. Greenberg	October 14, 2014	4.70
27	5	"A Hen in the Wolf House"	Holly Dale	Brent Fletcher	October 21, 2014	4.36
28	6	"A Fractured House"	Ron Underwood	Rafe Judkins & Lauren LeFranc	October 28, 2014	4.44
29	7	"The Writing on the Wall"	Vincent Misiano	Craig Titley	November 11, 2014	4.27
30	8	"The Things We Bury"	Milan Cheylov	DJ Doyle	November 18, 2014	4.58
31	9	"...Ye Who Enter Here"	Billy Gierhart	Paul Zbyszewski	December 2, 2014	5.36
32	10	"What They Become"	Michael Zinberg	Jeffrey Bell	December 9, 2014	5.29
33	11	"Aftershocks"	Billy Gierhart	Maurissa Tancharoen & Jed Whedon	March 3, 2015	4.48
34	12	"Who You Really Are"	Roxann Dawson	Drew Z. Greenberg	March 10, 2015	3.80
35	13	"One of Us"	Kevin Tancharoen	Monica Owusu-Breen	March 17, 2015	4.34
36	14	"Love in the Time of Hydra"	Jesse Bochco	Brent Fletcher	March 24, 2015	4.29
37	15	"One Door Closes"	David Solomon	Lauren LeFranc & Rafe Judkins	March 31, 2015	4.26
38	16	"Afterlife"	Kevin Hooks	Craig Titley	April 7, 2015	4.24
39	17	"Melinda"	Garry A. Brown	DJ Doyle	April 14, 2015	4.04
40	18	"The Frenemy of My Enemy"	Karen Gaviola	Monica Owusu-Breen & Paul Zbyszewski	April 21, 2015	4.45
41	19	"The Dirty Half Dozen"	Kevin Tancharoen	Brent Fletcher & Drew Z. Greenberg	April 28, 2015	4.57
42	20	"Scars"	Bobby Roth	Rafe Judkins & Lauren LeFranc	May 5, 2015	4.45
43	21	"S.O.S."	Vincent Misiano	Jeffrey Bell	May 12, 2015	3.88
44	22	"S.O.S."	Billy Gierhart	Jed Whedon & Maurissa Tancharoen	May 12, 2015	3.88

=== Season 3 (2015–16) ===
No. overall	No. in season	Title	Directed by	Written by	Original release date	U.S. viewers (millions)
45	1	"Laws of Nature"	Vincent Misiano	Jed Whedon & Maurissa Tancharoen	September 29, 2015	4.90
46	2	"Purpose in the Machine"	Kevin Tancharoen	DJ Doyle	October 6, 2015	4.32
47	3	"A Wanted (Inhu)man"	Garry A. Brown	Monica Owusu-Breen	October 13, 2015	3.74
48	4	"Devils You Know"	Ron Underwood	Paul Zbyszewski	October 20, 2015	3.85
49	5	"4,722 Hours"	Jesse Bochco	Craig Titley	October 27, 2015	3.81
50	6	"Among Us Hide..."	Dwight Little	Drew Z. Greenberg	November 3, 2015	3.84
51	7	"Chaos Theory"	David Solomon	Lauren LeFranc	November 10, 2015	3.49
52	8	"Many Heads, One Tale"	Garry A. Brown	DJ Doyle & Jed Whedon	November 17, 2015	3.60
53	9	"Closure"	Kate Woods	Brent Fletcher	December 1, 2015	3.84
54	10	"Maveth"	Vincent Misiano	Jeffrey Bell	December 8, 2015	3.85
55	11	"Bouncing Back"	Ron Underwood	Monica Owusu-Breen	March 8, 2016	3.52
56	12	"The Inside Man"	John Terlesky	Craig Titley	March 15, 2016	2.94
57	13	"Parting Shot"	Michael Zinberg	Paul Zbyszewski	March 22, 2016	2.88
58	14	"Watchdogs"	Jesse Bochco	Drew Z. Greenberg	March 29, 2016	3.20
59	15	"Spacetime"	Kevin Tancharoen	Maurissa Tancharoen & Jed Whedon	April 5, 2016	2.81
60	16	"Paradise Lost"	Wendey Stanzler	George Kitson & Sharla Oliver	April 12, 2016	3.01
61	17	"The Team"	Elodie Keene	DJ Doyle	April 19, 2016	2.85
62	18	"The Singularity"	Garry A. Brown	Lauren LeFranc	April 26, 2016	3.22
63	19	"Failed Experiments"	Wendey Stanzler	Brent Fletcher	May 3, 2016	2.92
64	20	"Emancipation"	Vincent Misiano	Craig Titley	May 10, 2016	2.93
65	21	"Absolution"	Billy Gierhart	Chris Dingess & Drew Z. Greenberg	May 17, 2016	3.03
66	22	"Ascension"	Kevin Tancharoen	Jed Whedon	May 17, 2016	3.03

=== Season 4 (2016–17) ===
No. overall	No. in season	Title	Directed by	Written by	Original release date	U.S. viewers (millions)
Ghost Rider
67	1	"The Ghost"	Billy Gierhart	Jed Whedon & Maurissa Tancharoen	September 20, 2016	3.44
68	2	"Meet the New Boss"	Vincent Misiano	Drew Z. Greenberg	September 27, 2016	2.95
69	3	"Uprising"	Magnus Martens	Craig Titley	October 11, 2016	2.68
70	4	"Let Me Stand Next to Your Fire"	Brad Turner	Matt Owens	October 18, 2016	2.34
71	5	"Lockup"	Kate Woods	Nora Zuckerman & Lilla Zuckerman	October 25, 2016	2.30
72	6	"The Good Samaritan"	Billy Gierhart	Jeffrey Bell	November 1, 2016	2.43
73	7	"Deals with Our Devils"	Jesse Bochco	DJ Doyle	November 29, 2016	2.41
74	8	"The Laws of Inferno Dynamics"	Kevin Tancharoen	Paul Zbyszewski	December 6, 2016	2.37
LMD
75	9	"Broken Promises"	Garry A. Brown	Brent Fletcher	January 10, 2017	2.72
76	10	"The Patriot"	Kevin Tancharoen	James C. Oliver & Sharla Oliver	January 17, 2017	2.03
77	11	"Wake Up"	Jesse Bochco	Drew Z. Greenberg	January 24, 2017	2.00
78	12	"Hot Potato Soup"	Nina Lopez-Corrado	Craig Titley	January 31, 2017	2.15
79	13	"BOOM"	Billy Gierhart	Nora Zuckerman & Lilla Zuckerman	February 7, 2017	2.08
80	14	"The Man Behind the Shield"	Wendey Stanzler	Matt Owens	February 14, 2017	2.13
81	15	"Self Control"	Jed Whedon	Jed Whedon	February 21, 2017	2.01
Agents of Hydra
82	16	"What If..."	Oz Scott	DJ Doyle	April 4, 2017	2.15
83	17	"Identity and Change"	Garry A. Brown	George Kitson	April 11, 2017	2.32
84	18	"No Regrets"	Eric Laneuville	Paul Zbyszewski	April 18, 2017	2.43
85	19	"All the Madame's Men"	Billy Gierhart	James C. Oliver & Sharla Oliver	April 25, 2017	2.15
86	20	"Farewell, Cruel World!"	Vincent Misiano	Brent Fletcher	May 2, 2017	2.15
87	21	"The Return"	Kevin Tancharoen	Maurissa Tancharoen & Jed Whedon	May 9, 2017	2.14
88	22	"World's End"	Billy Gierhart	Jeffrey Bell	May 16, 2017	2.08

=== Season 5 (2017–18) ===
No. overall	No. in season	Title	Directed by	Written by	Original release date	U.S. viewers (millions)
89	1	"Orientation"	Jesse Bochco	Jed Whedon & Maurissa Tancharoen	December 1, 2017	2.54
90	2	"Orientation"	David Solomon	DJ Doyle	December 1, 2017	2.54
91	3	"A Life Spent"	Kevin Hooks	Nora Zuckerman & Lilla Zuckerman	December 8, 2017	1.93
92	4	"A Life Earned"	Stan Brooks	Drew Z. Greenberg	December 15, 2017	1.84
93	5	"Rewind"	Jesse Bochco	Craig Titley	December 22, 2017	2.40
94	6	"Fun & Games"	Clark Gregg	Brent Fletcher	January 5, 2018	2.49
95	7	"Together or Not at All"	Brad Turner	Matt Owens	January 12, 2018	2.31
96	8	"The Last Day"	Nina Lopez-Corrado	James C. Oliver & Sharla Oliver	January 19, 2018	2.41
97	9	"Best Laid Plans"	Garry A. Brown	George Kitson	January 26, 2018	2.27
98	10	"Past Life"	Eric Laneuville	DJ Doyle	February 2, 2018	2.22
99	11	"All the Comforts of Home"	Kate Woods	Drew Z. Greenberg	March 2, 2018	1.90
100	12	"The Real Deal"	Kevin Tancharoen	Jed Whedon & Maurissa Tancharoen & Jeffrey Bell	March 9, 2018	2.04
101	13	"Principia"	Brad Turner	Craig Titley	March 16, 2018	2.07
102	14	"The Devil Complex"	Nina Lopez-Corrado	Matt Owens	March 23, 2018	2.07
103	15	"Rise and Shine"	Jesse Bochco	Iden Baghdadchi	March 30, 2018	1.88
104	16	"Inside Voices"	Salli Richardson-Whitfield	Mark Leitner	April 6, 2018	2.08
105	17	"The Honeymoon"	Garry A. Brown	James C. Oliver & Sharla Oliver	April 13, 2018	1.82
106	18	"All Roads Lead..."	Jennifer Lynch	George Kitson	April 20, 2018	1.67
107	19	"Option Two"	Kevin Tancharoen	Nora Zuckerman & Lilla Zuckerman	April 27, 2018	1.68
108	20	"The One Who Will Save Us All"	Cherie Gierhart	Brent Fletcher	May 4, 2018	1.65
109	21	"The Force of Gravity"	Kevin Tancharoen	Drew Z. Greenberg & Craig Titley	May 11, 2018	1.94
110	22	"The End"	Jed Whedon	Jed Whedon & Maurissa Tancharoen	May 18, 2018	1.88

=== Season 6 (2019) ===
No. overall	No. in season	Title	Directed by	Written by	Original release date	U.S. viewers (millions)
111	1	"Missing Pieces"	Clark Gregg	Jed Whedon & Maurissa Tancharoen	May 10, 2019	2.31
112	2	"Window of Opportunity"	Kevin Tancharoen	James C. Oliver & Sharla Oliver	May 17, 2019	2.18
113	3	"Fear and Loathing on the Planet of Kitson"	Jesse Bochco	Brent Fletcher & Craig Titley	May 24, 2019	2.26
114	4	"Code Yellow"	Mark Kolpack	Nora Zuckerman & Lilla Zuckerman	May 31, 2019	2.35
115	5	"The Other Thing"	Lou Diamond Phillips	George Kitson	June 14, 2019	2.18
116	6	"Inescapable"	Jesse Bochco	DJ Doyle	June 21, 2019	2.12
117	7	"Toldja"	Keith Potter	Mark Leitner	June 28, 2019	2.17
118	8	"Collision Course (Part I)"	Kristin Windell	Jeffrey Bell & Craig Titley	July 5, 2019	1.79
119	9	"Collision Course (Part II)"	Sarah Boyd	Iden Baghdadchi	July 12, 2019	2.30
120	10	"Leap"	Garry A. Brown	Drew Z. Greenberg	July 19, 2019	2.38
121	11	"From the Ashes"	Jennifer Phang	James C. Oliver & Sharla Oliver	July 26, 2019	2.14
122	12	"The Sign"	Nina Lopez-Corrado	Nora Zuckerman & Lilla Zuckerman	August 2, 2019	1.88
123	13	"New Life"	Kevin Tancharoen	Brent Fletcher & Jed Whedon	August 2, 2019	1.88

=== Season 7 (2020) ===
No. overall	No. in season	Title	Directed by	Written by	Original release date	U.S. viewers (millions)
124	1	"The New Deal"	Kevin Tancharoen	George Kitson	May 27, 2020	1.82
125	2	"Know Your Onions"	Eric Laneuville	Craig Titley	June 3, 2020	1.50
126	3	"Alien Commies from the Future!"	Nina Lopez-Corrado	Nora Zuckerman & Lilla Zuckerman	June 10, 2020	1.57
127	4	"Out of the Past"	Garry A. Brown	Mark Leitner	June 17, 2020	1.40
128	5	"A Trout in the Milk"	Stan Brooks	Iden Baghdadchi	June 24, 2020	1.37
129	6	"Adapt or Die"	Aprill Winney	DJ Doyle	July 1, 2020	1.32
130	7	"The Totally Excellent Adventures of Mack and The D"	Jesse Bochco	Brent Fletcher	July 8, 2020	1.39
131	8	"After, Before"	Eli Gonda	James C. Oliver & Sharla Oliver	July 15, 2020	1.38
132	9	"As I Have Always Been"	Elizabeth Henstridge	Drew Z. Greenberg	July 22, 2020	1.28
133	10	"Stolen"	Garry A. Brown	Story by : Mark Linehan Bruner; Teleplay by : George Kitson & Mark Leitner	July 29, 2020	1.30
134	11	"Brand New Day"	Keith Potter	Chris Freyer	August 5, 2020	1.25
135	12	"The End Is at Hand"	Chris Cheramie	Jeffrey Bell	August 12, 2020	1.46
136	13	"What We're Fighting For"	Kevin Tancharoen	Jed Whedon	August 12, 2020	1.46

== See also ==
- Agents of S.H.I.E.L.D. web series
  - Agents of S.H.I.E.L.D.: Slingshot
