= DJ Doyle =

American television writer

- Born: Massachusetts
- Other names: Daniel J. Doyle
- Occupation: Television writer
- Years active: 2010 - present

Daniel J. "DJ" Doyle is an American television writer.

He is well known for his work on ABC's Agents of S.H.I.E.L.D.

== Life and career ==
Doyle hails from Massachusetts. He was an accountant before "getting the bug" to get into the industry. He states The West Wing and Friday Night Lights as influential works. He first worked as a tape logger on the CBS series Survivor. He hesitantly quit that job to take a writers assistant position on NBC's Heroes; where he worked for two seasons. He departed that series to take a job on the new Fox series Touch; serving as writers assistant on the supernatural drama as well.

=== Agents of S.H.I.E.L.D. ===
A friend of Doyle's let him know that Marvel Studios was going to be doing their first network television series, and if he'd want to submit for it. Doyle did so, without knowing any other information about the series. He was hired as a writer's assistant, but quickly became a staple in the writers room. His first script, season one's "Nothing Personal", was written under the supervision of co-executive producer Paul Zbyszewski, whom he co-wrote the episode with. After the success of that outing, Doyle was given the responsibility of writing solo, during the shows sophomore season. His first effort was with "The Things We Bury", which was fairly well received critically and fanatically. He has gone on to write episodes: "Melinda", "Purpose in the Machine", "The Team", and the heavily lauded "Many Heads, One Tale", with co-creator Jed Whedon.
