= Many Heads, One Tale =

- Agents of S.H.I.E.L.D. episode
- Episode no.: Season 3 Episode 8
- Directed by: Garry A. Brown
- Written by: DJ Doyle; Jed Whedon
- Cinematography by: Allan Westbrook
- Editing by: Kelly Stuyvesant
- Original air date: November 17, 2015
- Running time: 43 minutes

Guest appearances
- Powers Boothe as Gideon Malick; Constance Zimmer as Rosalind Price; Andrew Howard as Luther Banks; Nelson Franklin as Steve Wilson; Mark Dacascos as Giyera; Blair Underwood as Andrew Garner

Episode chronology
← Previous "Chaos Theory"	Next → "Closure"
- Agents of S.H.I.E.L.D. season 3

"Many Heads, One Tale" is the eighth episode of the third season of the American television series Agents of S.H.I.E.L.D. Based on the Marvel Comics organization S.H.I.E.L.D., it follows Phil Coulson and his team of S.H.I.E.L.D. agents as they deal with revelations about Hydra. It is set in the Marvel Cinematic Universe (MCU) and acknowledges the franchise's films. The episode was written by DJ Doyle and Jed Whedon, and directed by Garry A. Brown.

Clark Gregg reprises his role as Coulson from the film series, and is joined by series regulars Ming-Na Wen, Brett Dalton, Chloe Bennet, Iain De Caestecker, Elizabeth Henstridge, Nick Blood, Adrianne Palicki, Henry Simmons, and Luke Mitchell. The episode retcons the history of Hydra that was established in the films, tying it into the series' Inhuman storyline.

"Many Heads, One Tale" originally aired on ABC on November 17, 2015, and according to Nielsen Media Research, was watched by 3.60 million viewers.

== Plot ==
Confirming he knows Grant Ward is looking for a secret Strucker family vault said to contain a secret great power, Gideon Malick orders his men to kill him. However Ward overpowers and tortures them, learning the vault is in Germany.

Alphonso "Mack" Mackenzie voices his concerns over Phil Coulson's relationship with Rosalind Price, but Coulson reveals that though he wants to trust Price, he has been planning a sting operation to unearth the Advanced Threat Containment Unit's (ATCU) secrets. While Coulson gives Price a tour of the Playground, Daisy Johnson uses a device smuggled into the ATCU with Andrew Garner to hack their mainframe, and Lance Hunter and Bobbi Morse visit to deal with the security breach, disguised as an FBI team. Morse sneaks away to investigate the part of the facility where the Inhumans are being held, but instead finds vitamin supplements containing Terrigen, discovering that they are given to all ATCU staff. She realizes that the ATCU are keeping the Inhumans elsewhere and are not working on a cure for Terrigenesis, but are instead trying to activate more Inhumans.

Updated on the situation, Coulson interrogates Price, suspecting she is Hydra, but she claims innocence of administering Terrigen to her staff, and reveals that Malick, her business partner, is responsible for overseeing the captured Inhumans. They realize that Malick has been removing the Inhumans to an unknown location, and is making more to serve him. Morse and Hunter are attacked by Malick's chief of security, the telekinetic Inhuman Giyera. After they subdue him, Banks helps them escape.

Investigating the Distant Star symbol, Leo Fitz and Jemma Simmons find variations over the centuries, and learn of a group who have been sending people through the Monolith for hundreds of years. Simmons becomes frustrated with Fitz for being so willing to help rescue Will Daniels, and he expresses his belief that they are cursed, because every time they have tried to express their feelings for one another something has interfered, such as Fitz nearly drowning (Note: During "Beginning of the End".) or Simmons being sent to another planet. (Note: During "4,722 Hours".) They kiss twice, the first being initiated by Fitz out of frustration, and the second being initiated by Simmons. By the way her head moves after the kiss, she is going for a third kiss, but Fitz breaks away, knocking a book off of the table. Simmons notices that one of the old Distant Star variants is identical to the symbol of Hydra. Price explains that she met Malick in 2001, when he was working with NASA on Project Distant Star. Meanwhile, Ward breaks into the Strucker vault and finds a waiting Malick, who shows him the family treasure: pieces of the Monolith carved centuries earlier. He claims that Red Skull did not create Hydra - the organization was instead founded in ancient times by the worshippers of a powerful Inhuman, whose enemies feared him so much that they banished him to another world using the Monolith. Ever since then Hydra have been sending sacrifices to this Inhuman (the creature Will and Simmons fought against), and have been seeking a way to bring it back to Earth. Malick has also been building an army of Inhumans to serve the ancient creature. Ward agrees to help Malick rescue the Inhuman, in exchange for his help destroying S.H.I.E.L.D. Ward later tortures Andrew with mustard gas in a bid to make him transform into Lash.

== Production ==
=== Development ===
In November 2015, Marvel announced that the eighth episode of the season would be titled "Many Heads, One Tale", to be written by executive producer Jed Whedon and DJ Doyle, with Garry A. Brown directing.

=== Casting ===
In November 2015, Marvel revealed that main cast members Clark Gregg, Ming-Na Wen, Brett Dalton, Chloe Bennet, Iain De Caestecker, Elizabeth Henstridge, Nick Blood, Adrianne Palicki, Henry Simmons, and Luke Mitchell would star as Phil Coulson, Melinda May, Grant Ward, Daisy Johnson, Leo Fitz, Jemma Simmons, Lance Hunter, Bobbi Morse, Alphonso "Mack" Mackenzie, and Lincoln Campbell, respectively. It was also revealed that the guest cast for the episode would include Blair Underwood as Andrew Garner, Constance Zimmer as Rosalind Price, Andrew Howard as Luther Banks, Powers Boothe as Gideon Malick, Mark Dacascos as Mr. Giyera, Nelson Franklin as Steve Wilson and Astrea Campbell-Cobb as flight attendant. Campbell-Cobb did not receive guest star credit in the episode. Underwood, Zimmer, Howard, and Boothe reprise their roles from earlier in the series.

=== Marvel Cinematic Universe tie-ins ===
The episode expands the history of Hydra, tying it into the series' ongoing Inhumans storyline. Established in the films as having been founded by Red Skull during World War II, as seen in Captain America: The First Avenger, it is revealed here that the organization was actually formed centuries earlier in service to a powerful Inhuman and Red Skull was just following the principles of the original group. This history of Hydra has ties to the comics, specifically Jonathan Hickman and Dustin Weaver's S.H.I.E.L.D.

== Broadcast ==
"Many Heads, One Tale" was first aired in the United States on ABC on November 17, 2015.

== Reception ==
=== Ratings ===
In the United States the episode received a 1.3/4 percent share among adults between the ages of 18 and 49, meaning that it was seen by 1.3 percent of all households, and 4 percent of all of those watching television at the time of the broadcast. It was watched by 3.60 million viewers.
