= Elodie Keene =

American film and television director (born 1949)

- Born: April 10, 1949 (age 77); Berkeley, California, U.S.
- Occupations: Film director, television director, television editor, television producer
- Years active: 1979–present
- Spouse: Bruce Fortune
- Children: 2
- Family: Christopher Keene (brother); Daniel E. Koshland Jr. (stepfather)

Elodie Keene (born April 10, 1949, in Berkeley, California) is an American film director, television director, producer and editor. As a television director, her credits include ER, NYPD Blue, The Practice, Ally McBeal, Charmed, Felicity, The Wire, House, M.D., The Closer, and Nip/Tuck, among other series.

She has won three Primetime Emmy Awards, two for best dramatic series and one for best editing in a single camera series, all for her work on L.A. Law. Keene is the daughter of Yvonne (née Cyr) and Jim Keene. Her mother was of Acadian, German, and Scottish descent. Her parents divorced in 1953 and her mother remarried to Jim San Jule in 1954 until their divorce in 1970. She has three siblings: Philip Keene (born 1941), Christopher Keene (born 1946), and Tamsen (née San Jule) Calhoon (born 1956). Her mother remarried to biochemist Daniel E. Koshland Jr. in 2000, of the Haas family, the owners of Levi Strauss & Co.

== Filmography ==
=== Director ===
Year	Series	Episode Title	Notes
1990	L.A. Law	"The Bitch Is Back"	Season 5, episode 1
1990	L.A. Law	"Forgive Me Father, for I Have Sued"	Season 4, episode 20
1991	L.A. Law	"TV or Not TV"	Season 6, episode 2
1991	L.A. Law	"There Goes the Judge"	Season 5, episode 20
1991	L.A. Law	"He's a Crowd"	Season 5, episode 12
1991	L.A. Law	"Splatoon"	Season 5, episode 9
1992	L.A. Law	"Second Time Around"	Season 7, episode 2
1992	L.A. Law	"Silence of the Lambskins"	Season 6, episode 19
1992	L.A. Law	"From Here to Paternity"	Season 6, episode 16
1992	L.A. Law	"Steal It Again, Sam"	Season 6, episode 13
1992	L.A. Law	"Back to the Suture"	Season 6, Episode 10
1993	L.A. Law	"How Much Is That Bentley in the Window"	Season 8, episode 3
1993	L.A. Law	"Hackett or Pack It"	Season 7, episode 22
1993	L.A. Law	"That's Why the Lady Is a Stamp"	Season 7, episode 17
1993	L.A. Law	"Spanky and the Art Gang"	Season 7, episode 10
1994	L.A. Law	"Tunnel of Love"	Season 8, episode 19
1994	L.A. Law	"Whose San Andreas Fault Is It, Anyway?"	Season 8, episode 16
1994	L.A. Law	"Cold Cuts"	Season 8, episode 12
1994	NYPD Blue	"You Bet Your Life"	Season 2, episode 8
1994	ER	"Chicago Heat"	Season 1, episode 6
1995	My So-Called Life	"In Dreams Begin Responsibilities"	Season 1, episode 19
1995	NYPD Blue	"Heavin' Can Wait"	Season 3, episode 4
1995	NYPD Blue	"Dirty Socks"	Season 2, episode 17
1995	ER	"The Birthday Party"	Season 1, episode 17
1996	NYPD Blue	"A Tushful of Dollars"	Season 3, episode 13
1997	Spy Game	"Why Spy?"	Season 1, episode 1
1998	To Have & to Hold	"Tangled Up in You"	Season 1, episode 3
1998	Maximum Bob	"Good Dog Karl"	Season 1, episode 5
1998	The Practice	"Duty Bound"	Season 2, episode 27
1998	Ally McBeal	"Once in a Lifetime"	Season 1, episode 15
1999	Popular	"Fall on Your Knees"	Season 1, episode 10
1999	Charmed	"The Power of Two"	Season 1, episode 20
1999	Felicity	"Happy Birthday"	Season 1, episode 18
1999	Ally McBeal	"Pyramids on the Nile"	Season 2, episode 14
2000	Law & Order: Special Victims Unit	"Noncompliance"	Season 2, episode 6
2000	Family Law	"Love and Money"	Season 1, episode 22
2000	Family Law	"Media Relations"	Season 1, episode 12
2000	Felicity	"Things Change"	Season 2, episode 15
2001	Scrubs	"My Day Off"	Season 1, episode 9
2001	Boston Public	"Chapter Eighteen"	Season 1, episode 18
2001	Judging Amy	"Crime & Puzzlement"	Season 3, episode 11
2001	Judging Amy	"The Beginning, the End and the Murky Middle"	Season 2, episode 13
2001	Family Law	"Planting Seeds"	Season 2, episode 24
2001	Family Law	"Americans"	Season 2, episode 21
2002	For the People	"Textbook Perfect"	Season 1, episode 8
2002	Once and Again	"One Step (Parent) Backward"	Season 3, episode 15
2002	Judging Amy	"Cause for Alarm"	Season 4, episode 5
2002	Judging Amy	"Nobody Expects the Spanish Inquisition"	Season 3, episode 23
2003	Line of Fire	"Boom, Swagger, Boom"	Season 1, episode 5
2003	Nip/Tuck	"Antonia Ramos"	Season 1, episode 12
2003	Nip/Tuck	"Kurt Dempsey"	Season 1, episode 5
2003	The Wire	"Hard Cases"	Season 2, episode 4
2003	The Wire	"Hot Shots"	Season 2, episode 3
2003	Boston Public	"Chapter Seventy-Six"	Season 4, episode 10
2004	Medical Investigation	"The Unclean"	Season 1, episode 11
2004	North Shore	"Leverage"	Season 1, episode 13
2004	The D.A.	"The People vs. Oliver C. Handley"	Season 1, episode 3
2004	Joan of Arcadia	"Recreation"	Season 1, episode 13
2004	Nip/Tuck	"Trudy Nye"	Season 2, episode 14
2004	Nip/Tuck	"Rose and Raven Rosenberg"	Season 2, episode 9
2004	Nip/Tuck	"Manya Mabika	Season 2, episode 3
2005	The Closer	"The Big Picture"	Season 1, episode 3
2005	Medical Investigation	"Black Book"	Season 1, episode 18
2005	Nip/Tuck	"KiKi"	Season 3, episode 2
2005	Nip/Tuck	"Momma Boone"	Season 3, episode 1
2006	The Closer	"To Protect & to Serve"	Season 2, episode 5
2006	The Closer	"Slippin'"	Season 2, episode 3
2006	Nip/Tuck	"Dawn Budge"	Season 4, episode 5
2006	Nip/Tuck	"Monica Wilder"	Season 4, episode 3
2007	The Closer	"Culture Shock"	Season 3, episode 10
2007	The Closer	"Dumb Luck"	Season 3, episode 6
2007	Nip/Tuck	"Duke Collins"	Season 5, episode 8
2007	Drive	"No Turning Back"	Season 1, episode 4
2008	The Closer	"Live Wire"	Season 4, episode 4
2008	Life	"The Business of Miracles"	Season 2, episode 3
2009	The Closer	"Good Faith"	Season 4, episode 11
2009	Life	"Hit Me Baby"	Season 2, episode 16
2009	Glee	"Vitamin D"	Season 1, episode 6
2009	Glee	"Mash-Up"	Season 1, episode 8
2009	Dollhouse	"Haunted"	Season 1, episode 10
2009	Saving Grace	"Do You Believe in Second Chances?"	Season 2, episode 9
2009	Lie to Me	"Fold Equity"	Season 2, episode 9
2010	Nip/Tuck	"Dan Daly	Season 6, episode 11
2010	NCIS: Los Angeles	"Past Lives"	Season 1, episode 12
2010	Glee	"Bad Reputation"	Season 1, episode 17
2010	Glee	"Funk"	Season 1, episode 21
2010	Pretty Little Liars	"To Kill a Mockingbird"	Season 1, episode 3
2010	Huge	"Movie Night"	Season 1, episode 5
2010	Huge	"Birthdays"	Season 1, episode 8
2010	Huge	"Parents' Weekend, Part II"	Season 1, episode 10
2010	The Glades	"Booty"	Season 1, episode 10
2010	Hawaii Five-O	"Heihei"	Season 1, episode 10
2011	Memphis Beat	"Inside Man"	Season 2, episode 2
2011	Pretty Little Liars	"My Name Is Trouble"	Season 2, episode 3
2011	Switched at Birth	"Pandora's Box"	Season 1, episode 8
2011	Necessary Roughness	"Whose Team Are You On?"	Season 1, episode 7
2011	The Lying Game	"Over Exposed"	Season 1, episode 5
2012	The Mentalist	"My Bloody Valentine"	Season 4, episode 12
2012	Pretty Little Liars	"The Naked Truth"	Season 2, episode 19
2012	Switched at Birth	"The Sleep of Reason Produces Monsters"	Season 1, episode 21
2012	Necessary Roughness	"Shrink or Swim"	Season 2, episode 1
2012	Bunheads	"Money for Nothing"	Season 1, episode 5
2012	Covert Affairs	"Hello Stranger"	Season 3, episode 6
2012	Hart of Dixie	"If It Makes You Happy"	Season 2, episode 3
2012	Animal Practice	"The Two George Colemans"	Season 1, episode 6
2012	The New Normal	"The XY Factor"	Season 1, episode 10
2012	The Mentalist	"Black Cherry"	Season 5, episode 9
2013	The New Normal	"The Goldie Rush"	Season 1, episode 12
2013	The New Normal	"Gaydar"	Season 1, episode 14
2013	The New Normal	"Blood, Sweat and Fears"	Season 1, episode 19
2013	The New Normal	"Finding Name-O"	Season 1, episode 21
2013	Glee	"Sweet Dreams"	Season 4, episode 19
2013	Necessary Roughness	"Snap Out of It"	Season 3, episode 14
2013	Hart of Dixie	"Friends in Low Places"	Season 3, episode 2
2013	The Mentalist	"The Great Red Dragon"	Season 6, episode 7
2014	The Fosters	"Family Day"	Season 1, episode 14
2014	Glee	"City of Angels"	Season 5, episode 11
2014	The Fosters	"Take Me Out"	Season 2, episode 2
2014	Rush	"Get Lucky"	Season 1, episode 8
2014	Nashville	"I Feel Sorry For Me"	Season 3, episode 4
2015	Jane the Virgin	"Chapter Ten"	Season 1, episode 8
2015	The Fosters	"Stay"	Season 2, episode 13
2015	Perception	"Mirror"	Season 3, episode 13
2015	NCIS: New Orleans	"Rock-A-Bye Baby"	Season 1, episode 20
2015	The Fosters	"Going South"	Season 3, episode 5
2015	The Astronaut Wives Club	"Flashpoint"	Season 1, episode 5
2015	The Astronaut Wives Club	"Rendezvous"	Season 1, episode 7
2015	NCIS: New Orleans	"Broken Hearted"	Season 2, episode 7
2016	Just Add Magic	"Just Add Birthdays"	Season 1, episode 6
2016	Just Add Magic	"Just Add Mama P"	Season 1, episode 7
2016	The Fosters	"If and When"	Season 3, episode 15
2016	The Fosters	"Sixteen"	Season 3, episode 17
2016	Agents of S.H.I.E.L.D.	"The Team"	Season 3, episode 17
2016	The Fosters	"Trust"	Season 4, episode 3
2016	Devious Maids	"Blood, Sweat and Smears"	Season 4, episode 7
2016	Devious Maids	"I Saw the Shine"	Season 4, episode 8
2016	American Horror Story: Roanoke	"Chapter 7"	Season 6, episode 7
2017	Sweet/Vicious	"Heartbreaker"	Season 1, episode 7
2017	Sweet/Vicious	"Back to Black"	Season 1, episode 8
2017	Chicago Justice	"Judge Not"	Season 1, episode 4
2017	The Blacklist: Redemption	"Borealis 301"	Season 1, episode 5
2017	Taken	"Solo"	Season 1, episode 7
2017	Scorpion	"Nuke Kids on the Block"	Season 4, episode 4
2018	S.W.A.T.	"Contamination"	Season 1, episode 12
2018	Taken	"Strelochnik"	Season 2, episode 8
2018	Insatiable	"Banana Heart Banana"	Season 1, episode 10
2018	All American	"Lose Yourself"	Season 1, episode 4
2019	Chicago Med	"Old Flames, New Sparks"	Season 4, episode 16
2019	Proven Innocent	"A Minor Confession"	Season 1, episode 3
2019	Dynasty	"New Lady in Town"	Season 2, episode 20
2019	Grand Hotel	"Groom Service"	Season 1, episode 9
2020	FBI: Most Wanted	"Invisible"	Season 1, episode 7
2020	Chicago Med	"It May Not Be Forever"	Season 5, episode 14
2020	Dynasty	"You Make Being a Priest Sound Like Something Bad"	Season 3, episode 18
2020	FBI: Most Wanted	"Deconflict"	Season 2, episode 3
2022	Monarch	"Not Our First Rodeo"	Season 1, episode 4
