= The Team (Agents of S.H.I.E.L.D.) =

- Agents of S.H.I.E.L.D. episode
- Promotional poster
- Episode no.: Season 3 Episode 17
- Directed by: Elodie Keene
- Written by: DJ Doyle
- Original air date: April 19, 2016
- Running time: 43 minutes

Guest appearances
- Powers Boothe as Gideon Malick; Juan Pablo Raba as Joey Gutierrez; Natalia Cordova-Buckley as Elena "Yo-Yo" Rodriguez; Mark Dacascos as Giyera; Gabriel Salvador as Lucio

Episode chronology
← Previous "Paradise Lost"	Next → "The Singularity"
- Agents of S.H.I.E.L.D. season 3

"The Team" is the seventeenth episode of the third season of the American television series Agents of S.H.I.E.L.D. Based on the Marvel Comics organization S.H.I.E.L.D., it follows Phil Coulson and his team of S.H.I.E.L.D. agents as they learn of a traitor among the Secret Warriors. It is set in the Marvel Cinematic Universe (MCU) and acknowledges the franchise's films. The episode was written by DJ Doyle, and directed by Elodie Keene.

Clark Gregg reprises his role as Coulson from the film series, and is joined by series regulars Ming-Na Wen, Brett Dalton, Chloe Bennet, Iain De Caestecker, Elizabeth Henstridge, Henry Simmons, and Luke Mitchell.

"The Team" originally aired on ABC on April 19, 2016, and according to Nielsen Media Research, was watched by 2.85 million viewers.

== Plot ==
The Zephyr is brought to Gideon Malick's headquarters, where Phil Coulson, Leo Fitz, Jemma Simmons and Alphonso "Mack" Mackenzie evade Hydra troops and try to protect a badly wounded Melinda May, while the Secret Warriors (Daisy Johnson, Lincoln Campbell, Joey Gutierrez and Elena Rodriguez) attack the base to rescue them. Elena rescues the S.H.I.E.L.D. agents, Lincoln captures Malick, Daisy defeats Giyera and Joey kills Lucio. The team escape in the Zephyr, but Hive reveals to Giyera that he has taken control of one of the Secret Warriors during the rescue.

During interrogation Malick reveals to Coulson that Hive murdered his daughter, Stephanie, and warns him that Hive can control Inhumans. Lucio's autopsy proves that Hive's parasites infected his brain, and Coulson, realizing that the same could have happened to any of the Secret Warriors, has the base secretly locked down, informing only Fitz, Simmons and Mack of the situation. During a power failure Fitz and Simmons find Malick dead in his cell, before a grenade destroys his body, covering up the cause of his death. When Coulson attempts to apprehend the Secret Warriors, they evade him and fight among themselves, accusing each other of being under Hive's control, until Daisy leads the others into a cell to put an end to the fighting.

Mack finds James' Kree artifact in Lincoln's locker rather than in the Playground vaults, and Lincoln is accused of being under Hive's control. He protests his innocence and defends himself, but is subdued by Daisy. Joey and Elena have grown distrustful of S.H.I.E.L.D. because of how they were wrongfully accused and treated, and they are allowed to leave the Playground, after submitting to brain scans proving they are not infected. While working on a way to cure those Hive has infected, Fitz and Simmons kiss.

Daisy escapes her cell and visits an incarcerated Lincoln, revealing that she is the one who is under Hive's control, and that she murdered Malick and framed Lincoln. She tries to convince him to leave with her and join Hive, but a disappointed and betrayed Lincoln refuses. Stealing the Kree artifact and several Terrigen crystals, Daisy uses her powers to destroy much of the Playground, with Coulson, May, Fitz, Simmons, Mack and Lincoln trapped inside, before escaping in a quinjet.

In an end tag, Hive informs Giyera that Daisy (whom he refers to as "Skye", based on Grant Ward's memories) has killed Malick, and they debate what to do with the vast fortune he left behind.

== Production ==
=== Development ===
In April 2016, Marvel announced that the seventeenth episode of the season would be titled "The Team", to be written by DJ Doyle, with Elodie Keene directing.

=== Casting ===
In April 2016, Marvel revealed that main cast members Clark Gregg, Ming-Na Wen, Brett Dalton, Chloe Bennet, Iain De Caestecker, Elizabeth Henstridge, Nick Blood, Adrianne Palicki, Henry Simmons, and Luke Mitchell would star as Phil Coulson, Melinda May, Hive, Daisy Johnson, Leo Fitz, Jemma Simmons, Lance Hunter, Bobbi Morse, Alphonso "Mack" Mackenzie, and Lincoln Campbell, respectively. It was also revealed that the guest cast for the episode would include Juan Pablo Raba as Joey Gutierrez, Powers Boothe as Gideon Malick, Natalia Cordova-Buckley as Elena "Yo-Yo" Rodriguez, Mark Dacascos as Giyera, Gabriel Salvador as Lucio and Rob Silverman as Kevin. Silverman did not receive guest star credit in the episode. Raba, Boothe, Cordova-Buckley, Dacascos, and Salvador reprise their roles from earlier in the series. Blood and Palicki do not ultimately appear.

== Broadcast ==
"The Team" was first aired in the United States on ABC on April 19, 2016.

== Reception ==
=== Ratings ===
In the United States the episode received a 0.9/3 percent share among adults between the ages of 18 and 49, meaning that it was seen by 0.9 percent of all households, and 3 percent of all of those watching television at the time of the broadcast. It was watched by 2.85 million viewers.
