= Garry A. Brown (producer) =

American television producer

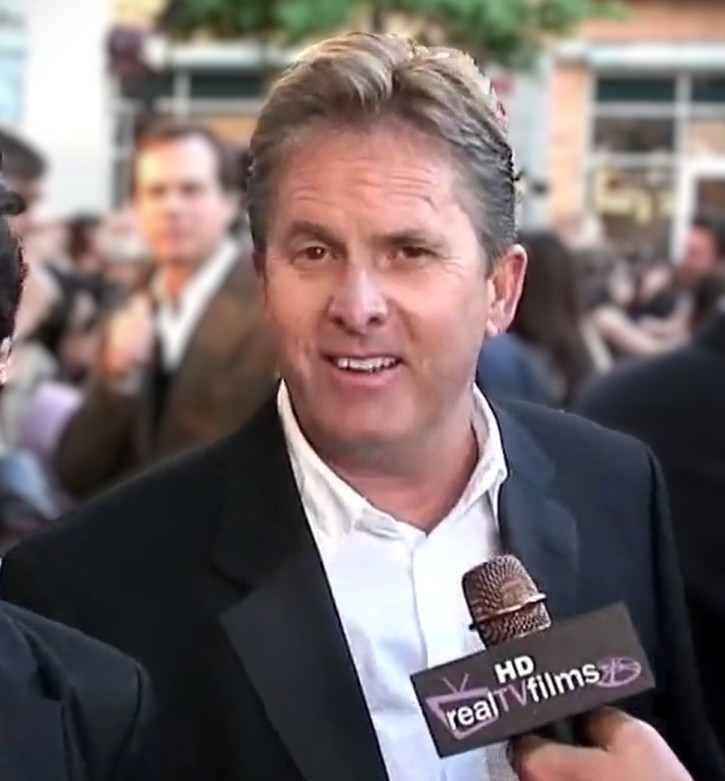
- Brown in 2010
- Other name: Garry Brown
- Occupations: Television producer, director
- Years active: 1982–present

Garry A. Brown is an American television producer and television director.

He is known for his work on Fox's Prison Break; and for the ABC adventure series Agents of S.H.I.E.L.D.

== Career ==
Brown began his career on Timerider: The Adventure of Lyle Swann, in 1982, as a production assistant. In 1987, Browning appeared as one of the 3rd Class Aliens in Bad Taste. He went on to work in several other capacities, such as production manager, assistant direct, second unit director and producer, on several series, such as: The A-Team, Miami Vice, Werewolf, Hunter, Tales from the Crypt, Walker, Texas Ranger, Sons of Thunder, Mister Sterling, Chase, The Deep End and Breakout Kings.

His seminal work came from working on the Fox series Prison Break, throughout its entire run as a producer, second unit director, and ultimately director, helming two episodes toward the end of its run. In 2012, Brown joined Marvel Studios new series Agents of S.H.I.E.L.D. as a producer and second unit director. With the commencement of second season, he was promoted to co-executive producer and director. Since then, Brown has helmed episodes: "Melinda", "A Wanted (Inhu)man", "Many Heads, One Tale" and "The Singularity". In 2013, Brown directed his first film Charlie: A Toy Story; centering on a ten-year-old boy and his golden retriever and their mission to stop town bullies from destroying his dad's toy shop.
