= Melinda (Agents of S.H.I.E.L.D.) =

- Agents of S.H.I.E.L.D. episode
- "The Art of Evolution" poster for the episode.
- Episode no.: Season 2 Episode 17
- Directed by: Garry A. Brown
- Written by: DJ Doyle
- Cinematography by: Feliks Parnell
- Editing by: David Crabtree
- Original air date: April 14, 2015
- Running time: 43 minutes

Guest appearances
- Kyle MacLachlan as Calvin Zabo; Henry Simmons as Alphonso "Mack" Mackenzie; Dichen Lachman as Jiaying; Jamie Harris as Gordon; Luke Mitchell as Lincoln Campbell; Ruth Negga as Raina; Christine Adams as Anne Weaver; Derek Phillips as O'Brien; Terrell Tilford as Hart; Winter Ave Zoli as Eva Belyakov; Kris Lemche as Ethan Johnston; Blair Underwood as Andrew Garner; Ava Acres as Katya Belyakov

Episode chronology
| ← Previous "Afterlife" | Next → "The Frenemy of My Enemy" |
- Agents of S.H.I.E.L.D. season 2

"Melinda" is the seventeenth episode of the second season of the American television series Agents of S.H.I.E.L.D., based on the Marvel Comics organization S.H.I.E.L.D. (Strategic Homeland Intervention, Enforcement and Logistics Division), revolving around the character of Skye as she learns about her abilities, her parents, and her titular S.H.I.E.L.D. mentor Melinda May, whose dark past is explored through flashbacks. It is set in the Marvel Cinematic Universe (MCU) and acknowledges the franchise's films. The episode was written by DJ Doyle, and directed by Garry A. Brown.

Clark Gregg reprises his role as Phil Coulson from the film series, and is joined by Chloe Bennet as Skye and Ming-Na Wen as May. Recurring guest stars Kyle MacLachlan and Dichen Lachman portray Skye's parents, while series regulars Iain De Caestecker, Elizabeth Henstridge, Nick Blood, and Adrianne Palicki also star. This episode reveals May's history, which had been teased since the beginning of the series, and which not even Wen had known about before reading the episode's script. Efforts were made to differentiate the younger May shown in flashbacks to the present day version of the character, and Blair Underwood guest stars as May's then husband Andrew Garner.

"Melinda" originally aired on ABC on April 14, 2015, and according to Nielsen Media Research, was watched by 4.04 million viewers.

== Plot ==
In flashbacks to 2008, Phil Coulson and Melinda May traveled to Bahrain to confront an enhanced individual named Eva Belyakov, who possesses super-strength. The encounter backfires when Eva and some local gangsters take a S.H.I.E.L.D. team and several locals hostage, and May enters the building they are using to rescue the hostages. She finds them acting out of character, and they attack her, but she defeats them and kills Eva in a fight, before discovering her young daughter, Katya, is the real threat, having taken control of the hostages to feed on their pain. When Katya kills the Bahrainis she is controlling, May is forced to fatally shoot her. S.H.I.E.L.D. assume Eva was the threat and Katya was caught in the crossfire, and May is lauded for saving the S.H.I.E.L.D. team single-handedly and given the nickname "the Cavalry". However, she is deeply traumatized, and retires from field duty to move to an administrative role. Her marriage to Andrew Garner also suffers, eventually leading to divorce.

In the present May, now in command of the Playground, is shocked to learn that Coulson has been moving alarming amounts of assets and manpower across the world as part of a secret project, "Theta Protocol", and has been meeting with Andrew in secret. Theta Protocol is the main reason Robert Gonzales' faction instigated their coup, fearing Coulson is building a secret army of superhumans. Determined to find the truth, May orders Jemma Simmons to open the toolbox, unaware Simmons has secretly duplicated it so Leo Fitz could take the real one to Coulson.

At Afterlife, Gordon tries to help Raina adapt to her new form, and she mentions to Lincoln Campbell that she has been having nightmares about Skye and Cal. During training to focus her abilities to manipulate objects' natural frequencies, Skye mentions that she does not know when she was born. Jiaying becomes upset and tells her that she was born on July 2, 1988, revealing herself as Skye's mother and explaining that after she was mutilated by Daniel Whitehall, her body was repaired by Cal and her own healing abilities resurrected her. She convinces Skye to keep their connection secret, as the rules dictate that the child of an active Inhuman should not undergo Terrigenesis, and reveals to her that Eva and Katya were Inhumans, and that Eva disobeyed this rule and stole Terrigen crystals to bring about Katya's Terrigenesis, which drove her insane.

Jiaying convinces Skye to visit Cal, and the family surprisingly enjoy their evening together, but Lincoln witnesses them together and realizes Raina's nightmares may be prophetic visions. In an end tag, Fitz uses the toolbox to contact Coulson and Lance Hunter, asking them to help him escape Gonzales' agents, who are following him.

== Production ==
=== Development ===
In March 2015, Marvel announced that the seventeenth episode of the season would be titled "Melinda", to be written by DJ Doyle, with Garry A. Brown directing.

=== Writing ===
Ming-Na Wen was not told of her character Melinda May's backstory in the series until she read the script for this episode. Executive producer Jeffrey Bell talked about exploring May's backstory in the episode after it being teased since the start of the series, saying "she's a very different May in this episode. This is the May before this incident happened. And so there are qualities that Ming[-Na Wen] brings to the role. Seeing her married back in the day... we've already met Andrew (Blair Underwood), but to sort of see what May was like back at that time is a different color". On balancing this backstory with the series' present day story, and integrating the two, Bell said "We have a backstory, but the backstory needs to be compelling enough so that you don't mind it being a backstory, so that when you come back to the present story, you're equally interested. Anytime you're telling two or three stories, you're always worried about one being more interesting than the other. And I think this episode does a very nice job in that you're happy to be in any of them."

=== Casting ===
In March 2015, Marvel revealed that main cast members Clark Gregg, Wen, Chloe Bennet, Iain De Caestecker, Elizabeth Henstridge, Nick Blood, and Adrianne Palicki would star as Phil Coulson, Melinda May, Skye, Leo Fitz, Jemma Simmons, Lance Hunter, and Bobbi Morse, respectively. It was also revealed that the guest cast for the episode would include Henry Simmons as Alphonso "Mack" Mackenzie, Ruth Negga as Raina, Kyle MacLachlan as Calvin Zabo, Jamie Harris as Gordon, Christine Adams as Anne Weaver, Blair Underwood as Andrew Garner, Dichen Lachman as Jiaying, Luke Mitchell as Lincoln Campbell, Kris Lemche as Ethan, Terrell Tilford as Agent Hart, Derek Phillips as Agent O'Brien, Winter Ave Zoli as Eva Belyakov, Ava Acres as Little Girl / Katya Belyakov, Brendan Wayne as Assistant, Ben Wise as Blue Jacket, Omid Zader as Burly Gangster, Hani Al Naimi as Fiasal El-Hashem, Houshang Touzie as Colonel, Branden Morgan as Tac Agent #1, Alex Paez as Tac Agent #2, and Antonio Leon as Bahranian Soldier. Acres, Wayne, Wise, Zader, Al Naimi, Touzie, Morgan, Paez, and Leon did not receive guest star credit in the episode. Simmons, Negga, MacLachlan, Harris, Adams, Underwood, Lachman, and Mitchell reprise their roles from earlier in the series. Main cast member Brett Dalton, who portrays Grant Ward in the series, does not appear in the episode.

Wen explained the differences in portraying the younger, pre-incident May in flashbacks, saying "we got to part her hair in the middle with a little bit of fluff. We were trying to find a subtle way to distinguish her from the May that has been established besides her personality, which was still very much May, in that she's not this outgoing, boisterous clown and then turned into this diehard killing machine. She always had a scary side to her, but at the same time there was a lightness, and a lot of love, and she was able to show her sexiness with Andrew, and her playfulness with Coulson in her earlier part of her life, before this event happened. ... It brought a little bit of Ming into May".

== Release ==
=== Broadcast ===
"Melinda" was first aired in the United States on ABC on April 14, 2015.

=== Marketing ===
For the final twelve episodes of the season Marvel once again ran the "Art of..." initiative, in which an image was released the Thursday before the episode aired, depicting a first look at a key event from the upcoming episode, with the season's title being "The Art of Evolution". The different artists were once again chosen to create the teaser posters, based on their previous work and how it connected to the themes and emotion of the intended episode. "Melinda"'s poster, by Jenny Frison, mirrored the focus of the episode by prominently featuring an image of May, highlighting her backstory and why she is called "the Cavalry".

=== Home media ===
The episode began streaming on Netflix on June 11, 2015, and was released along with the rest of the second season on September 18, 2015, on Blu-ray and DVD. The episode, along with the rest of the series, was removed from Netflix on February 28, 2022, and later became available on Disney+ on March 16, 2022.

== Reception ==
=== Ratings ===
In the United States the episode received a 1.6/5 percent share among adults between the ages of 18 and 49, meaning that it was seen by 1.6 percent of all households, and 5 percent of all of those watching television at the time of the broadcast. It was watched by 4.04 million viewers.

=== Accolades ===
Wen was named TVLine's "Performer of the Week" for the week of April 12, 2015, for her performance in this episode, specifically her portrayal of May in the flashback sequences.
