= Agents of S.H.I.E.L.D. =

2013–2020 Marvel Television series

- The title card for the first two seasons
- Genre: Action; Drama; Science fiction; Superhero
- Created by: Joss Whedon; Jed Whedon; Maurissa Tancharoen
- Based on: S.H.I.E.L.D. by: Stan Lee; Jack Kirby
- Showrunners: Jed Whedon; Maurissa Tancharoen; Jeffrey Bell
- Starring: Clark Gregg; Ming-Na Wen; Brett Dalton; Chloe Bennet; Iain De Caestecker; Elizabeth Henstridge; Nick Blood; Adrianne Palicki; Henry Simmons; Luke Mitchell; John Hannah; Natalia Cordova-Buckley; Jeff Ward
- Composers: Bear McCreary; Jason Akers (season 7)
- Country of origin: United States
- Original language: English
- No. of seasons: 7
- No. of episodes: 136 (list of episodes)

Production
- Executive producers: Alan Fine; Stan Lee; Joe Quesada; Jeph Loeb; Jeffrey Bell; Maurissa Tancharoen; Jed Whedon; Joss Whedon; Paul Zbyszewski; Jim Chory; Brent Fletcher; Craig Titley; Drew Z. Greenberg; Garry A. Brown
- Producers: Garry A. Brown; Chris Cheramie
- Production locations: Los Angeles; Culver City
- Running time: 41–44 minutes
- Production companies: ABC Studios; Marvel Television; Mutant Enemy Productions

Original release
- Network: ABC
- Release: September 24, 2013 – August 12, 2020

Related
- Agents of S.H.I.E.L.D.: Slingshot; Agent Carter; Marvel Cinematic Universe television series

Marvel's Agents of S.H.I.E.L.D. is an American television series created by Joss Whedon, Jed Whedon, and Maurissa Tancharoen for ABC based on the Marvel Comics organization S.H.I.E.L.D. (Strategic Homeland Intervention, Enforcement, and Logistics Division), a peacekeeping and spy agency in a world of superheroes. The series was the first to be set in the Marvel Cinematic Universe (MCU), and it acknowledges the continuity of the franchise's films and other television series. It was produced by ABC Studios, Marvel Television, and Mutant Enemy Productions, with Jed Whedon, Maurissa Tancharoen, and Jeffrey Bell serving as showrunners.

The series stars Clark Gregg as Phil Coulson, reprising his role from the film series, alongside Ming-Na Wen, Brett Dalton, Chloe Bennet, Iain De Caestecker, and Elizabeth Henstridge. Nick Blood, Adrianne Palicki, Henry Simmons, Luke Mitchell, John Hannah, Natalia Cordova-Buckley, and Jeff Ward joined in later seasons. The S.H.I.E.L.D. agents deal with various unusual cases and enemies, including Hydra, Inhumans, Life Model Decoys, alien species such as the Kree and Chronicoms, and time travel. Several episodes directly cross over with MCU films or other television series, notably Captain America: The Winter Soldier (2014), which significantly affected the series in its first season, and Agent Carter (2015–16), from which series regular Enver Gjokaj joined the cast for the seventh season. In addition to Gregg, other actors from throughout the MCU also appear in guest roles.

Joss Whedon, writer and director of the MCU film The Avengers (2012), began developing a S.H.I.E.L.D. pilot in August 2012. Gregg was confirmed to reprise his role that October, and the series was officially picked up by ABC in May 2013. The series attempted to replicate the production value of the MCU films on a broadcast television budget while also having to work within the constraints of the MCU that were dictated by Marvel Studios and the films. Prosthetic makeup was created by Glenn Hetrick's Optic Nerve Studios, while Legacy Effects contributed other practical effects. Composer Bear McCreary recorded each episode's score with a full orchestra, and the visual effects for the series were created by several different vendors and have been nominated for multiple awards.

The series premiered on ABC in the United States on September 24, 2013, and concluded with a two-part series finale on August 12, 2020, with 136 episodes broadcast over seven seasons. After starting the first season with high ratings, the ratings began to drop. Ratings continued to fall with subsequent seasons, but were more consistent within each season, while reviews for all seasons were consistently positive. Several characters created for the series have since been introduced to the comic universe and other media. An online digital series, Agents of S.H.I.E.L.D.: Slingshot, centered on Cordova-Buckley's Elena "Yo-Yo" Rodriguez, was released in December 2016 on ABC.com. Other spin-offs were planned but never materialized.

== Premise ==
The first season follows S.H.I.E.L.D. agent Phil Coulson as he puts together a small team of agents to handle strange new cases. They investigate Project Centipede and its leader, "The Clairvoyant", eventually uncovering that the organization is backed by the terrorist group Hydra, which has infiltrated S.H.I.E.L.D. In the second season, following the destruction of S.H.I.E.L.D. in Captain America: The Winter Soldier (2014), Coulson becomes director of the organization and is tasked with rebuilding it while dealing with Hydra, a faction of anti-superhuman S.H.I.E.L.D. agents, and a newly-revealed superhuman race called the Inhumans.

In the third season, Coulson begins a secret mission to assemble the Secret Warriors, a team of Inhumans, as Hydra restores its ancient Inhuman leader Hive to power. After the defeat of Hive and Hydra, S.H.I.E.L.D. is made a legitimate organization once again with the signing of the Sokovia Accords. In the fourth season, Coulson returns to being a field agent so S.H.I.E.L.D. can have a public leader, and is tasked with tracking down more enhanced people, including Robbie Reyes / Ghost Rider. In addition, Agent Leo Fitz and Holden Radcliffe complete their work on the Life Model Decoy and Framework virtual reality projects.

The fifth season sees Coulson and members of his team abducted to the space station Lighthouse in the year 2091, where they must try to save the remnants of humanity while figuring out how to get home. After returning to the present, where they are labeled fugitives, Coulson and his team work to prevent the future that they saw. They succeed in defeating a Gravitonium-powered Glenn Talbot, but Coulson dies due to his interactions with Ghost Rider in the previous season.

In the sixth season, the S.H.I.E.L.D. agents are divided into two groups: one heads to space to find Fitz, who is lost following the last season's time-traveling, while the other remains on Earth to face a team of mercenaries led by Sarge, a man that looks just like Coulson. The seventh and final season finds the team, including a Life Model Decoy of Coulson, jumping throughout time to prevent the Chronicoms from establishing Earth as their new home, Chronyca-3, and eradicating S.H.I.E.L.D. from history.

== Episodes ==
Season	Episodes	Originally released		Rank	Average viewers (in millions inc. DVR)
Season	Episodes	First released	Last released	Rank	Average viewers (in millions inc. DVR)
1	22	September 24, 2013	May 13, 2014	43	8.31
2	22	September 23, 2014	May 12, 2015	76	7.09
3	22	September 29, 2015	May 17, 2016	85	5.52
4	22	September 20, 2016	May 16, 2017	110	4.22
5	22	December 1, 2017	May 18, 2018	133	3.57
6	13	May 10, 2019	August 2, 2019	—N/a	—N/a
7	13	May 27, 2020	August 12, 2020	—N/a	—N/a

== Cast and characters ==
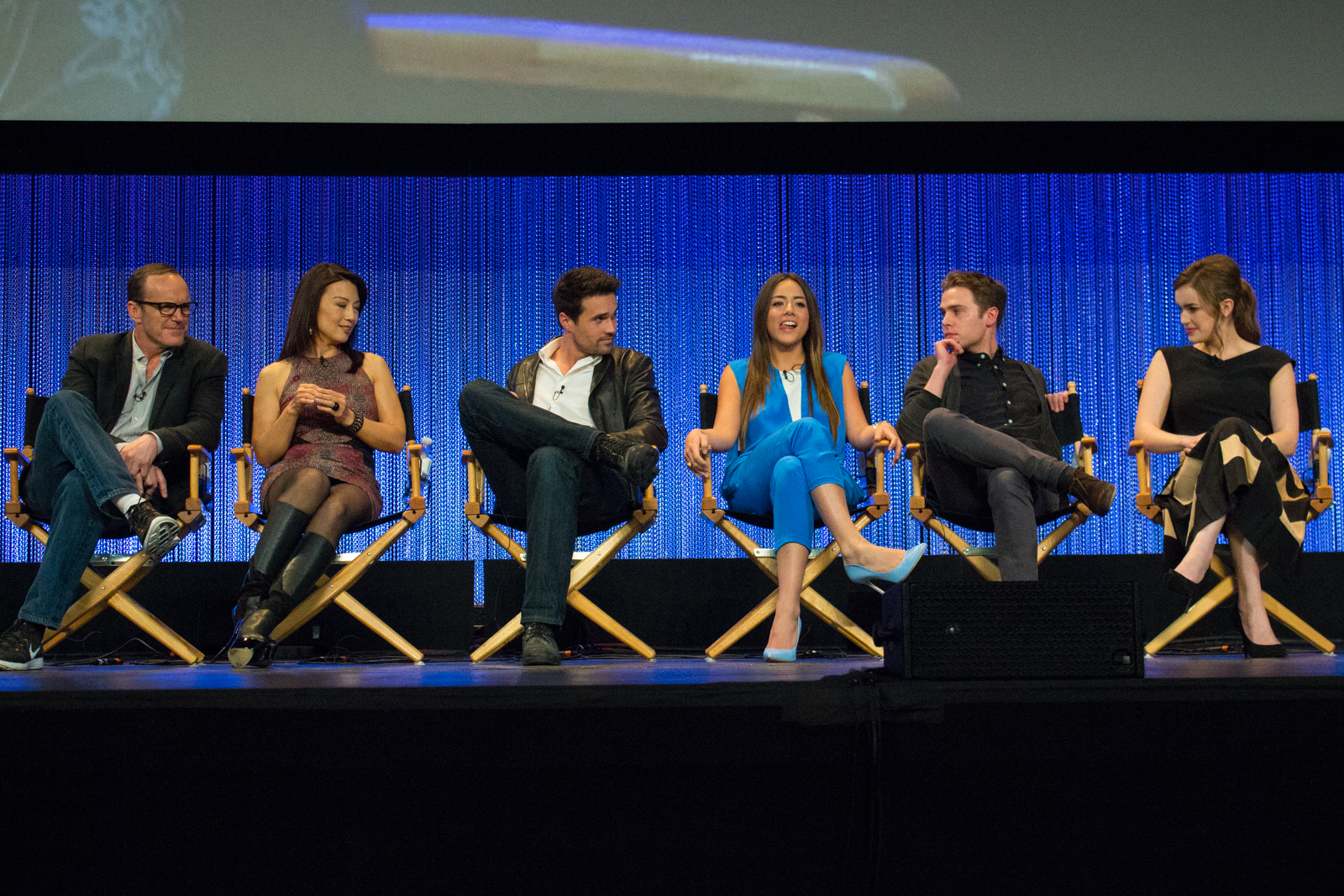
Agents of S.H.I.E.L.D. cast members (L to R): Gregg, Wen, Dalton, Bennet, De Caestecker, and Henstridge) at PaleyFest 2014

- Clark Gregg as Phil Coulson and Sarge / Pachakutiq:
  Coulson is an agent of S.H.I.E.L.D., and later becomes the organization's director. In April 2013, Gregg agreed to join the series after hearing creator Joss Whedon's explanation for Coulson's resurrection, following the character's death in The Avengers, which he called "fascinating" and "true to the world of the comics". Gregg approached Coulson's promotion to director as getting his dream job, which at the same time forced the character to adopt a more level-headed attitude, like that of Nick Fury. After being possessed by the Spirit of Vengeance in the fourth season finale, the Kree blood that resurrected Coulson is burned away and he ultimately dies following the fifth-season finale. Gregg plays a new character, Sarge, in season six, and portrays a Chronicom-enhanced Life Model Decoy version of Coulson in season seven.
- Ming-Na Wen as Melinda May:
  Joss Whedon had the character, a S.H.I.E.L.D. ace pilot and weapons expert, nicknamed "the Cavalry", and originally listed with the name Agent Althea Rice on casting sheets, "rolling around in his head" for a long time. Wen was given some backstory for the character to prepare, but was not told how she gained her reputation; with May's past revealed in "Melinda", Wen called it "devastating ... To have learned what she had to do, for the good of the many ... I can understand why it would traumatize her so much and cause her to retreat." Wen called May "unconventionally maternal", and said that it is her relationship with Coulson that makes her stay at S.H.I.E.L.D., despite her past.
- Brett Dalton as Grant Ward and Hive:
  Ward is a Hydra agent who poses as a S.H.I.E.L.D. black ops specialist. From the conception of the series it was decided that he would be a traitor. Jed Whedon explained that they wanted to have "infiltration based on betrayal" on a small scale to represent the same thing happening on a massive scale, and to make the Hydra revelation more personal for the characters. Dalton felt that Ward was always more loyal to his Hydra superior John Garrett than to Hydra itself, and that he would become more of a wildcard after Garrett's death, though still an antagonist to S.H.I.E.L.D. Ward is killed by Coulson in season three, and his body is possessed by an ancient Inhuman, Hive. Hive is killed in the season three finale. Dalton returned to the series in its fourth season to portray Ward in the virtual reality Framework, where he is Johnson's boyfriend. Austin Lyon portrays a young Ward.
- Chloe Bennet as Skye / Daisy Johnson / Quake:
  An Inhuman S.H.I.E.L.D. agent with the ability to manipulate vibrations and create earthquakes. The character of Skye was always intended to become the MCU version of Johnson, having consequences for the character's relationships with the other S.H.I.E.L.D. agents, especially Coulson. Bennet felt that the character was someone who would wear her heart on her sleeve while having some control over her emotions. Wen noted that the character evolves from being "anti-establishment into suddenly being someone who wants to create an establishment that would help" the Inhumans. In the third season she no longer goes by "Skye" and gains the public name "Quake".
- Iain De Caestecker as Leo Fitz:
  An agent of S.H.I.E.L.D. who specializes in engineering, especially weapons technology. De Caestecker described the character as "quite passionate about what he does" but not emotionally intelligent. Fitz has a close relationship with Simmons; De Caestecker says they "just kind of fit each other in a very weird way". The character sustains brain injuries at the end of the first season. The writers researched brain trauma with doctors and experts before approaching it in the series. De Caestecker did his own research as well, feeling it is "something that should never be trivialized. It's a real and serious thing ... we just have to constantly be respectful towards it."
- Elizabeth Henstridge as Jemma Simmons:
  A S.H.I.E.L.D. biochemist who specializes in life sciences (both human and alien). Henstridge described her character as "intelligent and focused and curious...she's got a wonderful relationship with Fitz. They kind of bounce off each other." As Fitz and Simmons begin to spend time apart during the series, Henstridge noted that it "brings a whole new dynamic just to them as characters" since they have been nearly inseparable since first meeting. On the harsher side of Simmons seen in later seasons, Henstridge noted that the character has "always been very mathematical in a way". Simmons is "profoundly" changed after being trapped on the planet Maveth for six months.
- Nick Blood as Lance Hunter:
  A mercenary before agreeing to join S.H.I.E.L.D. Blood described Hunter as someone who "doesn't bow down to the etiquette of the S.H.I.E.L.D. hierarchy". He later elaborated that the character feels very independent, so would probably not want to admit no longer feeling like an outsider. Also, "he doesn't have too much respect for authority and titles...If Coulson does something he respects, that's all good. If he doesn't, he's going to say something." On Hunter's on-again, off-again relationship with Bobbi Morse, Blood said, "there is a lot of truth in it of those relationships you have where it's kind of, 'can't live with each other, can't kill each other'".
- Adrianne Palicki as Bobbi Morse:
  Hunter's ex-wife and an agent of S.H.I.E.L.D. who spent time undercover within Hydra. Palicki was approached by the showrunners specifically for the part during season two. Palicki already had martial arts and gun training but had to learn to use the character's signature arnis sticks; she noted similarities between Morse's fighting style and that of Scarlett Johansson's Black Widow from the MCU films. Showrunner Jeffrey Bell said the character is more loyal to an idea than anything else, so what may seem in the short term as a betrayal by her is usually for what she sees as the greater good.
- Henry Simmons as Alphonso "Mack" Mackenzie:
  A S.H.I.E.L.D. mechanic with a distrust of the alien and superhuman. Simmons said the character is more worried about contributing in his own way and getting his job done away from the field. Mack does not like violence, but does "what he has to do". Mack reveals in the third season that he relies on his "faith", implying that he is a Christian. Dee Hogan of The Mary Sue described this as "a refreshingly positive portrayal of people of faith, as Mack demonstrates the quiet confidence and love rather than the aggression and bigotry that's so often associated with it". Mack becomes the new director of S.H.I.E.L.D. in season six.
- Luke Mitchell as Lincoln Campbell:
  An Inhuman with the ability to manipulate electrical charges. The character was introduced because the series already featured "a guy with no eyes" and "a woman who now is covered in thorns" but, like the X-Men, there are also Inhumans who are "just attractive people with powers", and so Campbell represents them in the series. Campbell dies in the third-season finale, making him the "Fallen Agent" that the series had been teasing for the entire second half of that season. The decision was made because the producers did not want "a body count show, but it is a real world with real stakes".
- John Hannah as Holden Radcliffe:
  A transhumanist who believes in the improvement of humanity through enhancement. Radcliffe initially worked with Hive before joining S.H.I.E.L.D., where he begins work on transferring his artificial intelligence AIDA to a Life Model Decoy, an old S.H.I.E.L.D. project.
- Natalia Cordova-Buckley as Elena "Yo-Yo" Rodriguez:
  A Colombian Inhuman who can move at super speed for a beat of her heart, before returning to the point she started from. She reluctantly joins S.H.I.E.L.D. and becomes a part of the Secret Warriors, eventually growing close to Mack, who gives her the nickname "Yo-Yo". When first portraying the character, Cordova-Buckley smiled whenever Rodriguez was about to use her abilities, to show an adrenaline rush and the feeling of having such power. After positive fan responses to this, the actress morphed this trait into a more mischievous personality for the character.
- Jeff Ward as Deke Shaw: A "roguish scavenger" on the Lighthouse space station in the year 2091, who returns to the present with the S.H.I.E.L.D. team and learns he is the grandson of Fitz and Simmons.

== Production ==
=== Development ===
After The Walt Disney Company purchased Marvel Entertainment in 2009, they announced that a Marvel Television division was being formed under Jeph Loeb. In the following months, various pilots based on comics from Marvel's catalog went into development. In July 2012, Marvel Television entered into discussions with Disney-owned ABC to make a new series set in the Marvel Cinematic Universe (MCU). The series was described as "'a kernel of an idea' with a number of scenarios being explored, including a high-concept cop show". On August 7, 2012, Joss Whedon was announced to be involved in the series' development. Whedon had written and directed the successful MCU film The Avengers (2012). On August 8, Whedon, along with his brother Jed and sister-in-law Maurissa Tancharoen, met with Loeb to pitch him their idea for the series, with meetings in the following days with ABC Studios and ABC network. At the end of August, ABC ordered a pilot for a series called S.H.I.E.L.D., to be written and directed by Joss Whedon, with Jed Whedon and Tancharoen also writing. Disney CEO Bob Iger greenlit the series after watching the Marvel One-Shots short film Item 47 (2012).

In April 2013, ABC announced that the series would be titled Marvel's Agents of S.H.I.E.L.D., and it was officially picked up for a full season of 22 episodes in May 2013. Jed Whedon, Tancharoen, and Jeffrey Bell served as the series' showrunners, with Bell joining the show to help the inexperienced former pair with hiring crew members and "navigating the politics of studios and networks", saying, "My job is to help them learn how to do that, to steer the ship while they learn." Joss Whedon assisted them before he started work on the sequel Avengers: Age of Ultron (2015). The series was renewed for a second season in May 2014, a third in May 2015, and a fourth in March 2016.

In September 2016, discussing the eventual end of the series, Tancharoen said, "You always just forge ahead. Until someone tells us to stop, we will continue to move forward." Jed Whedon added, "There are always ideas in the back of your mind for how you'd wrap it up when they say, 'That's it guys,' but we're not there just yet." A fifth season was ordered in May 2017, and Bell said they had "a sense of how we'd like the show to end when it ends. We just need to know when that time is coming so we can build to it properly". Jed Whedon continued, "Our goal is to know ahead of time, because we would love to land the story in a way that's satisfying". The writers intended for the final episode of the fifth season to serve as both a season and series finale, with some elements that could be adjusted based on whether the series was renewed for a sixth season or not. Whedon added, "we're ready for if this is the end. We're definitely going to make it rewarding either way." Despite this, the series was renewed for a sixth season in May 2018, and a final seventh season in November 2018. Whedon likened these two seasons to bonus levels in a video game, allowing the writers to have "a bit of freedom".

=== Writing ===
The idea of [Coulson] as the long-suffering bureaucrat who deals with Tony Stark's insufferability is delightful and hits the core of something I'm also writing about all the time—the little guy versus the big faceless organization....and that's what Clark Gregg embodies: the Everyman.

— Creator Joss Whedon on the underlying themes of the series.

Bell explained that he, Jed Whedon, and Tancharoen supervise all of the series' creative decisions, often consulting with Loeb. When the showrunners are writing the series, one person can write a script while the other two break stories, so that a story can be broken every few weeks. If the executive producers sign off on a story, a member of the series' writers room then produces an outline, gets notes on it from the showrunners, writes a full script, gets notes on it from ABC and the production crew, and then goes to set to produce the episode.

In January 2013, Joss Whedon deflected any direct influences from other series, such as the efforts of Fox Mulder and Dana Scully in The X-Files (1993-2002), and explained that while the show would involve people with powers and the spectacle of science-fiction storytelling, it would focus on "the peripheral people...the people on the edges of the grand adventures". As the series began to introduce more powered individuals, Bell noted that audiences "seem to respond to powered people on the show and while it's not going to take over and become what the show's about, as a texture and flavor of the stories, we really enjoy that". Jed Whedon stated that the series would continue to emphasize the general public's response to powered people, saying, "The dynamic in the world has changed. There was one person with powers, and then by The Avengers there were maybe six total ... now they're much more prevalent, so there's reaction from the public based on that."

On the balance between creating new material and drawing from existing mythology, Bell noted that telling stories that can entertain both Marvel fans and non-Marvel fans is challenging and that for the series, they try to add nods to the MCU films or the comics in a way that works well on its own for all viewers but could also mean more for a fan. On where the series can draw from the comics, Jed Whedon explained that there are areas of the comics that the series is not allowed to go to, and that ultimately they only use the comics for inspiration in generating their own story. Tancharoen elaborated that, "We're always going to be inspired and influenced by the comics, but of course on the show, we'll always be doing our spin to it." About comparisons between the scope of the series and that of the films, Bell said that ABC and Marvel had been very generous with the series' budget, and that the production could not complain for a network series, but that it was nothing compared to the films or even series like Game of Thrones (2011-2019). He explained that the series does attempt to create "Marvel moments" as best it can, but pointed out that some of the more memorable moments from the films are smaller, character moments—something that works really well on television—so the series strives for those when it cannot afford more scope and scale. Jed Whedon elaborated that they look at a sequence and try to keep only what is required to tell the story, so "If a monster is landing on a car, instead of showing the whole monster leaping through the skyline, we want to be in the car with the character having that experience".

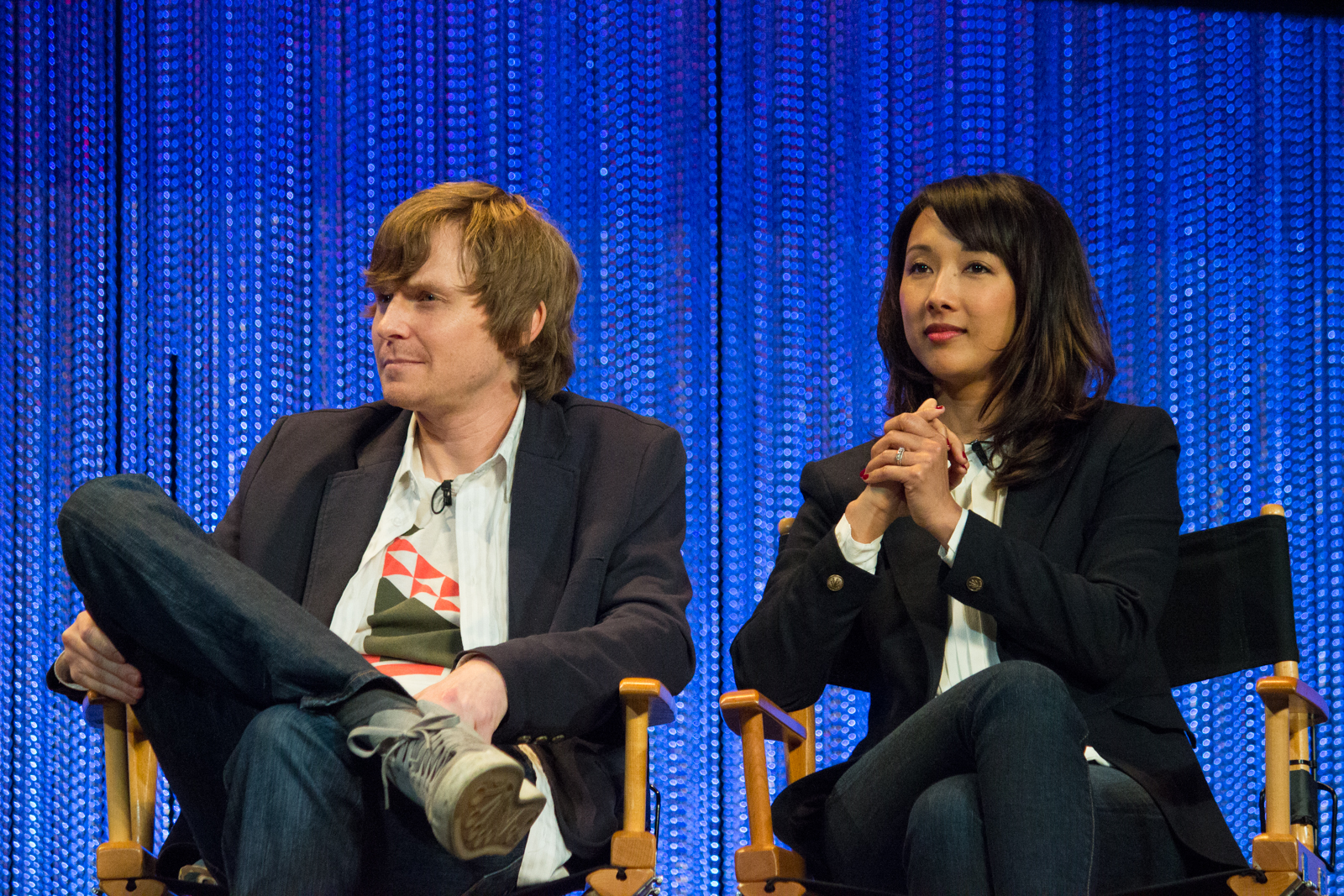
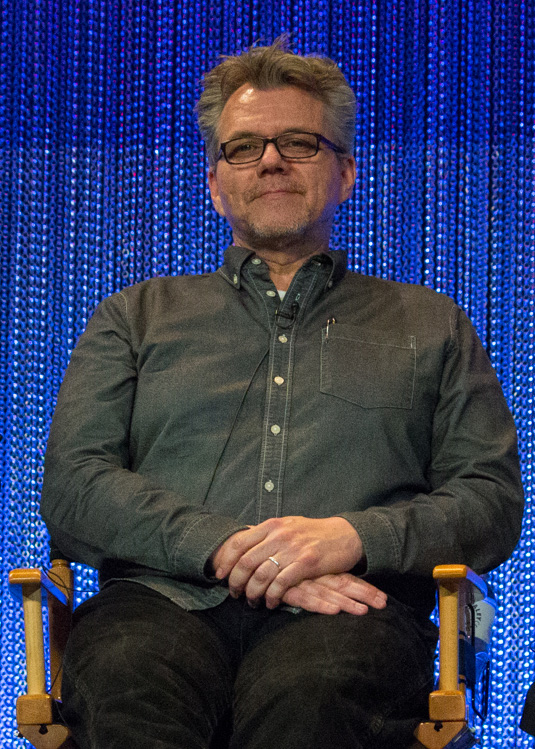
(L to R) Jed Whedon, Maurissa Tancharoen, and Jeffrey Bell, the showrunners of Agents of S.H.I.E.L.D.

Actress Ming-Na Wen attributed the time slot shift between the first and second seasons (from 8 pm EST to 9 pm EST) for allowing the writers "a chance to be more serious with certain topics, a little bit more intense with the fight scenes" in the second season, since the first season had to be more reserved because of it airing during a family time slot. In September 2015, Bell looked back on the first two seasons and talked about the challenges of and changes in the series. He noted the negative reception from fans concerning the low number of recognizable characters like Coulson, but pointed out that fans seemed to have grown to like the series' original characters as they had been developed over time. He explained that with the increasing number of characters and complex relationships in the series, having different pairings and building new emotional relationships was important, and stated that "whether it's a quiet moment or in action, we [hope to] deepen the audience's love and concern, and hopes for these characters". A year later, he reiterated the producer's intention to create a tradition moving forward of "finding new combinations and new conflicts" between different sets of characters, given "a lot of procedurals [see] the same people doing the same thing for five years and the character don't evolve or change at all".

The producers and writers initially formed a general plan for the show through the end of a third season, after reading the screenplays for upcoming MCU films. In May 2016, Chloe Bennet likened the end of the third season to "the end of the first book of S.H.I.E.L.D. ... the end of something bigger and the beginning of a whole new tone for the show." She elaborated that "the storylines that we started at the beginning of season 1 really wrapped up at the end of season 3. We've had some major losses of people who have been with us on the show since season 1. From the table read to the first day on set, there's definitely a new energy of the show" moving forward. The series was moved to the later timeslot of 10 pm for the fourth season. Jed Whedon said the writers hoped to "skew a little darker because of" this change, with Loeb adding that "It absolutely offers opportunities. I don't know that it changes things all that dramatically [though]. I mean, at the end of the day, Marvel is always going to make shows that run somewhere between PG-13 and PG-16. We're not going to be making Deadpool (2016) anytime soon on [ABC]". Marvel "had a long talk with ABC about what can we get away with, so to speak" in the new timeslot, which led to the inclusion of Ghost Rider in the season over one of Marvel's Netflix television series, because Marvel felt "that this character was right to tell [darker and more violent] stories right now" and having him on S.H.I.E.L.D. aided that because "it was so unexpected". Loeb hoped that the combination of the later timeslot and the introduction of Ghost Rider would lead to some viewers who had stopped watching the series over the previous seasons giving it another chance.

=== Casting ===
Sarah Halley Finn, the casting director of the MCU films, along with her associate Tamara Hunter, served as casting directors during the first season. In October 2012, a casting sheet for five lead roles was sent out, with Finn establishing offices in London, Australia, New York, Vancouver, Toronto, and Los Angeles to audition actors. At the New York Comic Con, Joss Whedon, Kevin Feige, and Clark Gregg announced that Gregg would be reprising his role as agent Phil Coulson from Iron Man (2008), Iron Man 2 (2010), Thor (2011), The Avengers, and the Marvel One-Shots in the pilot, and would "headline" the series. Also in October, actress Ming-Na Wen was cast as Melinda May. The next month, Elizabeth Henstridge and Iain De Caestecker were cast as Jemma Simmons and Leo Fitz, respectively, while newcomer Brett Dalton was cast as Grant Ward. Dalton gained 15 pounds (6.8 kg) of muscle before the start of filming for the role. In December, Chloe Bennet was chosen out of more than 400 actresses to play Skye, the sixth and final regular for the first season. Bell called the character "the hardest to find" since need to be "the quintessential Whedon heroine–strong, smart, and self-aware", which was difficult to find in a 20-year old. Skye is revealed in the second season to be Daisy Johnson, and no longer goes by "Skye" starting with the third.

At the 2014 San Diego Comic-Con, Nick Blood was announced as cast in the role of Lance Hunter for the second season, while the character of Bobbi Morse was revealed to be appearing. That August, Henry Simmons joined the cast as Alphonso "Mack" Mackenzie, a recurring role, and Adrianne Palicki was cast as Morse in a guest role, to first appear in the episode "A Hen in the Wolf House". The next month, the entire first season principal cast were confirmed to be regulars for the second season, along with Blood. Palicki joined them with the episode "Aftershocks". In February 2015, Luke Mitchell was cast as Lincoln Campbell, a recurring role for the second half of the season.

All season-two principal cast members returned for the third season, with Simmons and Mitchell joining them, promoted from their recurring roles. In October 2015, the Inhuman Hive was introduced; for the second part of season three, he possesses the corpse of Grant Ward, again portrayed by Brett Dalton. Also introduced were Natalia Cordova-Buckley and John Hannah, recurring as Elena "Yo-Yo" Rodriguez and Holden Radcliffe, respectively. Blood and Palicki left the main cast following the season-three episode "Parting Shot", to star in the then-planned spin-off show Marvel's Most Wanted. Dalton and Mitchell also left following the deaths of their characters in the third-season finale.

Gregg, Wen, Bennet, De Caestecker, Henstridge, and Simmons returned for the fourth and fifth seasons. They were joined by Hannah in the fourth, with Cordova-Buckley once again recurring as Rodriguez in the season, before being promoted to a series regular for the fifth season. Dalton returned as a guest during the third pod of the fourth season, while Blood returned for an episode of the fifth season. Introduced in the fifth season was Jeff Ward, who recurred as Deke Shaw.

Wen, Bennet, De Caestecker, Henstridge, Simmons, and Cordova-Buckley return for the sixth and seventh seasons, and were joined by Ward. Given the events of the final episode of season five, in which it is implied that Coulson dies, Gregg noted "there is some interest in having me involved in" the sixth season, potentially with flashback, and was also unsure if he would be a series regular, should he return, as he had been for the previous five seasons. Gregg ultimately returned as a series regular in season six playing a new character, Sarge. For season seven, Gregg portrays a Life Model Decoy (LMD) version of Coulson, while De Caestecker is absent for much of the season due to scheduling conflicts with prior commitments, first appearing in the season's eleventh episode; he is credited as a special guest star for his appearances in the season.

=== Design ===
==== Costumes ====
Betsy Heimann was the costume designer for the pilot, but left the series because of film commitments. Assistant costume designer Ann Foley took over for subsequent episodes, and worked closely with Tancharoen to create "very strong, different characters" whose "looks evolve along with the show". Foley also brought on concept artists Phillip Boutte Jr. and Josh Shaw to assist with the design process. Foley watched every MCU film, paying special attention to The Avengers, and was also inspired by such films as Skyfall (2012) and Mission: Impossible – Ghost Protocol (2011). In October 2016, Foley said that she was specifically following the aesthetic of Captain America: The Winter Soldier (2014), "So any costume has to fit inside that world we've established and has to fit that tactical look." On the variety of costumes created for each character, Foley preferred to have set pieces in the characters' "closets", as "it's not a fashion show ... a guy like Ward isn't going to have twenty jackets in his closet. He is going to have one that he uses all of the time."

After reading each script, Foley would do her own research, before discussing the look of the episode with the writers. She then studied the comics, general fashion, and history to get a look that is recognizable to fans, but fits into the more realistic world of the series. Costumes are either custom made or bought, and the actors are brought in for fittings before filming. This process was often challenging because of the series' eight-day-per-episode schedule. Foley stated that all costumes take a similar amount of time to create, whether they are based on the comics or not. Marvel CCO Joe Quesada is involved in the approval process when costuming preexisting characters, including Daisy Johnson's Quake costume, which is introduced in the third season. The Quake costume incorporates elements from the comic version of the character, and was intended to show that Quake "could easily be part of the Avengers". Foley took steps to differentiate the Quake costume from Scarlett Johansson's Black Widow costumes from the films, but was "flattered" by comparisons made between them. Foley was also adamant about showing that characters such as Quake "don't have to be sexualized, that they're powerful, strong women", and so avoided "a lot of cleavage, you don't see high heels. It's about practicality."

The costumes go through a natural evolution in the series. There is a shift at the end of the first season to a darker look, and all the characters have "definitely grown up" during the second season. In the third season there is another shift, "from the ragtag group of soldiers and scientists to [a] more precise militaristic outfit". This change is also reflected in the series' color palette, going from "a much lighter tone, much more patterns" in the first season to having "stripped away a bit of color" by the third. Despite this increasing darkness in the costumes, Foley intended to define each character as they are introduced and to have them always be recognizable and identifiable. With the start of the fourth season, Foley said that "each season definitely has its own feel and this season will be no different. I think that you're going to see some subtle differences in the costumes of the characters"; she felt like Fitz and Simmons, in particular, had become "more adult looking", while all the cast had "a pretty specific ... civilian look" that would become more prominent as S.H.I.E.L.D. is re-legitimized and becomes more public. Foley left the series after the thirteenth episode of the fourth season, to work on the television series Altered Carbon, and was replaced with Amanda Riley. Riley used her previous experience recreating costumes to "blend in" with Foley's established look. Foley returned for the first two episodes of the fifth season, before handing costume design over to Whitney Galitz, who had assisted Foley on the previous few seasons, and Christann Chanell. Galitz eventually became sole costume designer for the series, before being joined by Jessica Torok during season seven. Torok took over for the second half of the season after Galitz left the series to give birth to her daughter.

==== Practical effects ====
The series' props department is led by Scott Bauer. The pilot introduces the Incapacitating Cartridge Emitting Railgun, or I.C.E.R., tranquilizer weapons often used by the agents, with Joss Whedon having Bauer design "sci-fi"-looking guns, including a large rifle-like weapon. The series' further portrayal of the I.C.E.R.s was more subtle, with Bauer using airsoft guns that are safe to shoot others with over a small distance. I.C.E.R.-specific muzzle flashes are then added by the visual effects department. Bauer reused the I.C.E.R. rifle prop when making Mack's "Shotgun Ax", which appears in later seasons. The terrigen crystals that unlock Inhuman abilities in the series are 3D-printed from solid resin and then altered with extra details. Additional practical effects and props were created by Legacy Effects, which also works on the MCU films, notably creating Daisy Johnson's gauntlets for the third season. Prosthetic makeup for the series is designed in conjunction with Glenn Hetrick of Optic Nerve Studios. Hetrick began work on the series with the second season, to create Raina's Inhuman look, and returned for the third season to design and create the more unusual-looking Inhumans such as Lash.

==== Title sequence ====
The various title sequences used throughout the series (0:29 loop)

Throughout the series, Agents of S.H.I.E.L.D. "[became] known for its signature use of changing title cards" to reflect the storyline being told and would define "a specific era of the series". The third season introduces a new title sequence for the series, replacing the one that appeared in the first two seasons. The title sequence in "4,722 Hours" is drastically different from the design introduced for the third season, with the series' title in the episode's typeface silently fading onto the screen over the back drop of the planet Simmons is stranded on. The fourth season sees new series title cards for the Ghost Rider and LMD pods, and an Agents of S.H.I.E.L.D. title card for the Agents of Hydra pod that changes to say Agents of Hydra for episodes primarily set in the Framework. The Ghost Rider graphic is used again for the fourth-season finale.

For the fifth season, the opening of "Orientation" is reminiscent of the sequence for "4,722 Hours", forgoing the title card and having the typeface silently fading onto the screen. The subsequent episodes of season five feature a title card with the series name in a new typeface against a backdrop of various depictions of Earth: episodes through "Past Life" feature a destroyed future Earth; episodes from "Principia" through "The Devil Complex" feature a present Earth; while episodes from "Rise and Shine" through "All Roads Lead..." feature the Earth beginning to crack. Each episode of season seven features a different title card and opening to reflect the time period and genre of the episode.

=== Filming ===
Production for the pilot took place almost entirely in Los Angeles to accommodate Joss Whedon's schedule, while the rest of the series is primarily filmed at Culver Studios in Culver City, California. Additional filming has also taken place around the world, including in Paris, France, Stockholm, Sweden, and Old San Juan, Puerto Rico. Agents of S.H.I.E.L.D. used the working title R.A.G.T.A.G. throughout its production. The series is filmed on Arri Alexa cameras, with David Boyd serving as director of photography on the pilot, and Feliks Parnell, Jeff Mygatt, and Allan Westbrook doing so throughout the rest of the series. Garry Brown is the second unit director for the series, with stunts coordinated by Tanner Gill. The series is filmed in 2K resolution.

=== Visual effects ===
FuseFX serves as the lead visual effects vendor for Agents of S.H.I.E.L.D., with additional work by Pixomondo, CoSA VFX, Greenhaus GFX, Lion VFX, and Synaptic. The series sees an average of 80 to 150 visual effects shots per episode, with 10 to 12 days to work on the effects for one episode once background plates have been received from filming. This equates to approximately 2000 visual effects shots per season. Mark Kolpack serves as visual effects supervisor for the series. David Altenau was the in-house supervisor at FuseFX for "Pilot" through episode eight, with Kevin Lingenfelser taking over for subsequent episodes. VFX producer Andrea D'Amico joined the team at FuseFX to work on the series in December 2015. Two separate production management and creative teams were established to work on the show, and producers, compositors and various artists were able to alternate episodes. This was important because most of the episodes had to be worked on concurrently, either two or three at a time. Typical effects for the series include the creation of character-driving effects animation, photo-realistic vehicles, CG set extensions, pyrotechnics, and atmospheric effects. Some assets, such as a Quinjet and Helicarrier, are shared from Industrial Light & Magic, though "those models are generally super heavy and dense with data" and need to be made "HD friendly or simply manageable to work in [a] TV schedule".

=== Music ===
Bear McCreary confirmed that he would compose music for the series in July 2013. Unlike on some of his previous scores, ABC and Marvel allowed McCreary to work with a full symphonic orchestra, typically featuring 50 or 70 players, with over 90 for "important" episodes. Orchestra recording for the series occurred at Warner Bros. Studios' Eastwood Stage, Sony Pictures Studios' Barbra Streisand Scoring Stage, and Twentieth Century Fox Studios' Newman Scoring Stage. Complex synthesizer programming was also used, to give the score "a modern edge".

Since Agents of S.H.I.E.L.D. was the first MCU television series, McCreary felt there was "a sense that it had to connect" to the consistent orchestra sound of the films but viewed through a television lens. McCreary composes on average 30 minutes of music per episode. Creating the main theme for the series, which McCreary also saw as Coulson's theme, was a process that took a lot of collaboration with the executive producers, who wanted a specific sound—"something big, that...belonged in the Marvel Cinematic Universe" but also "intimate because these aren't superheroes, these are regular people". McCreary had to work harder to make the theme heard, given that the show does not have a traditional title sequence. By the third and fourth seasons, McCreary noted "the score became a little more intense and more electronically driven... [E]lectronics really moved to the forefront as we got into more stories about Inhumans and the digital world our characters inhabit. But the orchestra is always our foundation."

In 2014, after working as an intern for McCreary, Jason Akers was asked to provide additional music for the series. McCreary hired Akers as a full time staff member in 2015, and he began to have more artistic input into the series' music. Akers is credited as co-composer alongside McCreary for the seventh season. Some of McCreary's favorite pieces from the series included "Cello Concerto" from "The Only Light in the Darkness", and pieces that had "massive deviations" such as music for Ghost Rider, the Framework reality, and going to outer space.

==== Original soundtrack album ====
In September 2014, McCreary announced that there were plans for an Agents of S.H.I.E.L.D. soundtrack, which was released digitally a year later by Marvel Music on September 4, 2015, and on CD on October 9. Featuring music from the first two seasons, the soundtrack was written and produced by McCreary and Steven Kaplan, with the album produced by Joe Augustine with McCreary. All music composed by Bear McCreary. Steve Bartek plays guitar on "Aftermath of the Uprising", Eric Byers plays cello on "Cello Concerto", and McCreary's wife, Raya Yarbrough, provides the vocals in "Alien DNA". The episode column in the table below indicates which episode(s) the music was featured in.

Marvel's Agents of S.H.I.E.L.D. (Original Soundtrack Album)
No.	Title	Episode(s)	Length
1.	"Agents of S.H.I.E.L.D. Overture"		2:51
2.	"Showdown at Union Station"	"Pilot" and "The Bridge"	6:58
3.	"0-8-4"	"0-8-4"	9:02
4.	"Rocket Launch"	"0-8-4"	3:03
5.	"The Obelisk"	"Shadows"	3:56
6.	"Aftermath of the Uprising"	"Turn, Turn, Turn"	4:37
7.	"Gravitonium"	"The Asset"	4:20
8.	"Cal"	"One of Us"	2:42
9.	"Cello Concerto"	"The Only Light in the Darkness"	4:49
10.	"Willing to Sacrifice"	"Shadows"	4:32
11.	"Alien DNA"	"The Well", "Beginning of the End", and "Shadows"	5:58
12.	"FZZT"	"FZZT"	3:51
13.	"Garrett"	"T.A.H.I.T.I."	2:09
14.	"Hail Hydra"	"Turn, Turn, Turn"	1:47
15.	"Helicopter Rescue"	"Beginning of the End"	2:05
16.	"Terrigen Crystals"	"Scars"	4:21
17.	"The Big Bang"	"Beginning of the End"	7:05
18.	"The Rising Tide"	"Pilot"	3:46
Total length:			1:17:52

==== Future albums ====
Regarding the release of additional music from the series, McCreary said in August 2020 there were no immediate plans but would "love for that to happen", given he had been waiting until the series concluded to assess everything that had been produced for any potential future releases. He also hoped to get fan input regarding pieces of music they would like to hear on a release in addition to the tracks McCreary would want.

=== Marvel Cinematic Universe tie-ins ===
We're part of the Marvel Cinematic Universe, and so...we pitch our stuff to Kevin Feige and his movie group to see if there's something we can tie into, to see if they're okay about us using a character, or a weapon[, etc.]

— Executive producer Jeffrey Bell in September 2014, explaining the process of working in with the MCU.

In July 2013, Jed Whedon said the series would work in tandem with the Marvel films, both past and upcoming, to weave in between the films, and to "try to make them more rewarding on both ends." He explained that each Marvel project is intended to stand alone first before there is any interweaving, and noted that the series has to work with the film division and be aware of their plans so as not to interfere when introducing someone or something to the universe. Bell elaborated that this was preferable so that people who do not watch the films can still follow the series, and vice versa. He stated that "ABC and Marvel both want the series to be able to make sense on its own", but that it was beneficial for the films to have the series fill in any "gaps" for them, due to having to be "big" and moving "quickly through a lot of huge pieces", unlike television which has time to deal with more nuances.

In January 2016, Joss Whedon noted that this process "unfortunately just means the TV show gets, you know, leftovers". He stated that, for example, the series' creative team initially wanted to use Loki's scepter from The Avengers but were unable due to Whedon's plans for it in Age of Ultron. On how their ability to connect with the films changed over the life of the series, Jed Whedon said, "The rule when we started was we couldn't say anything about spies, we couldn't say anything about Hydra, we couldn't have any A.I. or robots or anything like that, because all of that was coming in movies that year or the year after. Since then, they've blown those doors wide open". He added, "We have relatively free rein [in what the series can introduce and connect to]; we just can't go anywhere that [the films are] going. They know their stories so much further out than we do, which is good for us to tee up things that we know are coming to them or avoid things that they want to be special on the big screen. As long as we are not covering bases that they're going to cover, we haven't been told "no" that much". As an example, Whedon noted the fourth season's Framework storyline as "something that's pretty significant in our world, but is also a little eddy in the river that doesn't affect anything else because it's an alternate universe. So those kinds of stories help us go big without sending ripples through the whole MCU." In May 2016, Chloe Bennet complained that Marvel did not acknowledge Agents of S.H.I.E.L.D. in their film universe, despite pretending that the films and televisions series were all connected; she expressed interest in seeing the Avengers in the series.

The series mimics the films' post credits scenes with "end tags", starting with the episode "0-8-4" which features a Samuel L. Jackson cameo as Nick Fury. Bell explained, "Sometimes it'll be funny, sometimes it'll be a mythology thing ... or an extra little reveal about" the episode. The end tag for "End of the Beginning" is a "directly lifted" scene from Captain America: The Winter Soldier.

The series's first major tie-in episode with the wider MCU was "The Well", which begins immediately after Thor: The Dark World (2013). The episodes "End of the Beginning" and "Turn, Turn, Turn" revolve around the events of Captain America: The Winter Soldier, which led to a retooling of the series. Flashback sequences in "Shadows" and "The Things We Bury" featuring Hayley Atwell as Peggy Carter served as marketing and set-up for the Agent Carter television series. The events of "The Frenemy of My Enemy" and "The Dirty Half Dozen" led up to the opening sequence of Avengers: Age of Ultron, while "Scars" deals with the aftermath of that film. The third season follows similar themes to the film Captain America: Civil War (2016), focusing on powered people and the different responses to them, leading up to the episode "Emancipation", which takes place after the film and shows how its events affect the series' powered characters.

The episode "T.A.H.I.T.I." introduces the Kree alien race to the MCU, members of which play a significant role in Guardians of the Galaxy (2014). This begins a storyline that recurs throughout the series and introduces Inhumans to the MCU, with Jed Whedon saying that it was something "in the works" for a long time since Marvel Studios had plans for an Inhumans film in 2019, and this would be "one of the first instances where we get to start planting the seeds on the show before the film". The third season introduces the concept of the Secret Warriors, with new Inhuman characters inspired by the comic of the same name, while also retconning the history of Hydra in the MCU, tying it into the Inhumans storyline. Gregg noted in January 2016 that the "writer and director [of the Inhumans film] will have free rein to do what they want to do with the Inhumans, but hopefully there'll be some way that our Inhumans connect to that". When the film was removed from Marvel Studios' release schedule, Whedon noted that the series had "a little more freedom" and were "able to do a little bit more" with the species going into the fourth season, including the potential of introducing some of the "classic" Inhumans. Marvel's Inhumans, a television series centered on Black Bolt and other members of the Inhuman Royal Family, was announced in November 2016 to air on ABC in September 2017. It was not intended to be a spin-off of Agents of S.H.I.E.L.D.

In the lead-up to Avengers: Age of Ultron, Joss Whedon explained that despite bringing Phil Coulson back to life to helm Agents of S.H.I.E.L.D. and the MCU itself dealing with characters seemingly dying only to return later on like Loki, Nick Fury, and Bucky Barnes, "As far as the fiction of the movies, Coulson is dead", choosing to not reference Coulson's resurrection in Age of Ultron to not diminish the impact of his original death among the characters. Whedon further elaborated that due to his feeling those who watched The Avengers may not have necessarily watched Agents of S.H.I.E.L.D., in addition to introduce nineteen new characters, he would have been forced to explain Coulson's resurrecting once again to the film-only audience had Coulson been featured in Age of Ultron. Despite this, Jeph Loeb stated prior to the film's release that there was a plan for the Avengers to discover that Coulson was alive eventually.

The fourth season explores the concept of Life Model Decoys, which were first referenced in The Avengers, and introduces the character Ghost Rider to the MCU. On why the series waited to begin exploring LMDs, Jed Whedon said that the series previously did not want to explore the concept before the release of Avengers: Age of Ultron, which sees the introductions of Ultron and Vision in a similar manner to LMDs. On introducing Ghost Rider, Whedon said that "with Doctor Strange (2016) coming out this year, the Marvel [Cinematic] Universe is moving into new waters", referring to the exploration of magic. "We felt that this was obviously a great character that we'd love to have on our show that we feel fits with that shift." The season also continues storylines from the second season of Agent Carter, with the reveal that the Momentum Energy Labs group is a successor to the Isodyne Energy company, with both companies connected by the parent company Roxxon, a mainstay of the MCU. The last four episodes of season five take place over a single day, and coincide with the events of Avengers: Infinity War (2018). In August 2017, Emily VanCamp said that discussions had taken place for her to reprise her role of Sharon Carter for the series, but there were conflicts with her starring role on the series Revenge (2011–2015). The following month, Jeremy Renner expressed interest in reprising his role as Clint Barton / Hawkeye in the series. Patrick Brennan, who portrayed Marcus Daniels / Blackout in the series, appears as an unnamed bartender in the film Captain Marvel (2019). Marvel Studios producer Victoria Alonso alluded to the possibility that the two were the same character, given that film was set in the 1990s.

Season seven sees Enver Gjokaj reprise his role as Strategic Scientific Reserve agent Daniel Sousa from Agent Carter, joining the main S.H.I.E.L.D. team. There was a discussion to retcon Officer Saunders, a character Gjokaj played in The Avengers, into Sousa by having Sousa time travel back to the Battle of New York and going undercover as a cop, but the idea was dropped due to conflicts with the established timeline. The Quantum Realm is also featured in the season, with Fitz using it to travel to the altered timeline created during the season and reunite with the S.H.I.E.L.D. team before bringing everyone back to the main timeline. Whedon added that, with this introduction into the series, they planned to mention how the realm could be used to survive the snap from Thanos, as seen in Avengers: Infinity War and Avengers: Endgame (2019), but was ultimately cut. Reed Diamond, who portrayed elite member of Hydra Werner Reinhardt / Daniel Whitehall, had been approached by Marvel Studios regarding his availability for Avengers: Endgame, with visual effects company Cantina Creative eventually using a photo of Whitehall in imagery for the film's time heist information screens, which was ultimately cut.

In May 2020, Bennet called Agents of S.H.I.E.L.D. "the black sheep of the Marvel Universe" since "everyone was aware of the fact that we were supposed to be one thing when we started" and ultimately, the writers "had to side-step" many potential opportunities in order to not conflict with the plans for the films. Henstridge also added that in past seasons, all of the episodes had to be reviewed to ensure they would not show something the films would be covering, but for the final season, "there was just such a sense of just abandon" with all the ideas the writers came up with allowed to happen. Ahead of the series finale in August 2020, Gregg and Wen looked back at the early tie-ins the series had in season one. Both felt having to wait until the release of The Winter Soldier resulted in the early episodes "treading water" and "hampered the writers" creativity. Despite this, Gregg did feel the end of season one "holds up really well" once the Hydra twist was revealed. Both added the series took off once the writers were less tied to the MCU films and were able to focus on the stories of the characters in the series. Following the series finale, Bell looked back on the series and felt because of all the restrictions it faced from Marvel Studios until the Hydra reveal, it was "a tech series" when the audience was expecting "a superhero show with a lot of Marvel brand names". Tancharoen added that the series was "more case-of-the-week" when it first premiered, but that allowed them to plant various story devices that could be fully explored once they got past the Hydra reveal. Bell also revealed the series at one point had been given permission to use the character MODOK before Marvel retracted their access the character, hoping to work it into their storyline with Anton Ivanov / The Superior in season four. The series had also tried to incorporate the space-based counterpart organization, S.W.O.R.D., but was stopped from doing this by Marvel.

The Darkhold, a magical book that is prominently featured in season four, was later featured in the Disney+ miniseries WandaVision (2021) with a different design from the one it had in Agents of S.H.I.E.L.D. WandaVision head writer Jac Schaeffer said there were no major conversations amongst the writers regarding the Darkhold's previous appearances in Agents of S.H.I.E.L.D.; co-executive producer Mary Livanos had pitched the idea to use the Darkhold in WandaVision to increase the level of danger Agatha Harkness posed to Scarlet Witch. The new design was based on how the Darkhold looks in the comic books and questions about how it was created. Despite the redesign, WandaVision director Matt Shakman felt this was the same Darkhold as the one seen in Agents of S.H.I.E.L.D. Schaeffer said the nature of the Darkhold would be further explored in future projects. The film Doctor Strange in the Multiverse of Madness (2022) shows that multiple copies of the Darkhold exist across the multiverse. "Glorious Purpose", the first episode of the Disney+ series Loki (2021–2023), revisits Coulson's death without acknowledging his return in Agents of S.H.I.E.L.D. When asked if they toyed with mentioning Coulson's resurrection, Loki head writer Michael Waldron said the idea could be "one other tendril of the multiverse, perhaps" and believed simply seeing Coulson again raised exciting questions. In August 2024, Brad Winderbaum, Marvel Studios' head of streaming, television, and animation, was asked about Agents of S.H.I.E.L.D.'s place in the franchise. He praised the series' connections to the films and acknowledged that Marvel Studios could consider it part of the MCU's Multiverse Saga but he was unwilling to confirm that at the time.

== Marketing ==
Social media accounts for the series were set up in January 2013, months before ABC officially ordered it, "a rarity for a pilot". By May 17, 2013, Agents of S.H.I.E.L.D. was the top new show of the television season in terms of social media activity, with the series' official Twitter account having over 46,000 followers and its official Facebook page having close to half a million likes. Many cast and crew members "live tweet" each episode, with J. August Richards noting that this brings instant feedback from viewers, and allows the crew to "watch the audience take that journey" in real time. In September 2013, ABC announced the weekly companion digital aftershow, Agents of S.H.I.E.L.D.: Declassified, hosted by Brett Erlich, The series aired on ABC.com, Marvel.com, WatchABC.com, and the Watch ABC app from September 24, 2013, to May 13, 2014, comprising 23 episodes.. Three expanded installments with guests were planned for the first season for its more "provocative storylines". Verizon Wireless served as Declassified's sponsor and created a hub featuring the aftershow alongside "live social feeds, Twitter polling, and sharable clips and graphics". Verizon was also the presenting sponsor of Agents of S.H.I.E.L.D. on Watch ABC.

For the final six episodes of the first season, Marvel began the "Marvel's Agents of S.H.I.E.L.D.: The Art of Level Seven" initiative, in which a different image was released each Thursday before a new episode, depicting a first look at a key event from the upcoming episode. Bell stated that the initiative was a way to tie the series back to its comics roots, and was thought of at the beginning of the first season. The production team tried to pair specific artists to the teaser posters based on their previous work and how it connected to the themes and emotion of the intended episode. For the second season, the series returned as "The Art of Evolution", with an image for each of the final twelve episodes of the season. For season five, Marvel revived their marketing art program, with "Marvel's Agents of S.H.I.E.L.D.: The Road to 100", with five posters, one for each season of the series, representing "key pivotal moments of each season" to commemorate the series reaching 100 episodes.

At the 2014 San Diego Comic-Con, Marvel Custom Solutions and Lexus released a limited single-issue comic tie-in titled Agents of S.H.I.E.L.D.: The Chase, set between the season 1 episodes "Seeds" and "T.R.A.C.K.S." The comic was written by George Kitson, with art by Mirko Colak, Neil Edwards, and Mirco Pierfederici.

Various marketing web series for Agents of S.H.I.E.L.D. were created. A five-part web series titled Agents of S.H.I.E.L.D.: Double Agent, also sponsored by Lexus, was released from March 4 to May 6, 2015, on ABC.com. The web series follows a newly hired Agents of S.H.I.E.L.D. production assistant, who acts as a double agent for the "Mastermind", portrayed by Stan Lee. Cast and crew members from the series, such as Gregg, also appear, with viewers having the ability to vote in an online poll after each episode to guess where the double agent would go in the next episode; votes entered viewers in a drawing to win prizes from the set of Agents of S.H.I.E.L.D. Double Agent was nominated for Outstanding Digital Series at the 27th Producers Guild of America Awards. Another Lexus-sponsored five-part web series, Agents of S.H.I.E.L.D.: Academy, released from March 9 to May 4, 2016, on ABC.com and Watch ABC. In Academy, three Agents of S.H.I.E.L.D. fans compete to play an agent in that series. Members of the Agents of S.H.I.E.L.D. cast also appear. All three fans ultimately made cameo appearances in the third-season finale. Agents of S.H.I.E.L.D.: Academy was nominated at the 28th Producers Guild of America Awards for Outstanding Digital Series.

The series has been promoted with various subtitles at different times, including Agents of S.H.I.E.L.D.: Uprising in season one, leading up to the Winter Soldier crossover; Agents of S.H.I.E.L.D.: Fallen Agent for the end of the third season; Agents of S.H.I.E.L.D.: Ghost Rider for the first "pod" of season four; and Agents of S.H.I.E.L.D.: LMD for the second "pod" of season four. The third "pod" of season four was known as Agents of Hydra. In November 2020, props, costumes, and set pieces from the series were auctioned off.

== Release ==
=== Broadcast ===
Agents of S.H.I.E.L.D. airs in the United States on ABC, in 720p high definition and 5.1 surround sound, despite delivering the episodes to ABC in 1080p. The first season aired on Tuesdays at 8 pm EST for the first season, and starting with the second season, the series aired on Tuesdays at 9 pm EST, before moving to the 10 pm time slot on Tuesdays for the fourth season. For its fifth season, the series aired on Fridays at 9 pm EST, on Fridays at 8 pm EST for season six, and aired at 10 pm EST on Wednesdays for season seven.

The second and third seasons of the series were broadcast in two blocks each, with a season of Agent Carter airing in between. Bell explained that this decision was made following the challenge of producing 22 episodes for the first season to be aired over 36–40 weeks, which meant having repeats and "losing momentum". Instead, Agent Carter took up much of that gap in a row, leaving the back half of Agents of S.H.I.E.L.D.'s season to run uninterrupted. This format allowed the producers and writers to approach each season in two parts, each with distinct stories connected by carried-over elements. Ahead of the fourth season, Tancharoen explained, "For the past two seasons, we've been able to break our season down into two little mini-seasons because of the airdate schedule. This upcoming season, our airdate schedule is a little different, so we're breaking it into three pods. Story wise, the development of that has made our lives easier, to break it down in that way." The pod format was described as "7-10 episodes [that feature] little 'enclosed plotlines' that formed a larger whole".

Regarding whether they would break the fifth season into pods again as with season four, Bell said, "A 22-episode arc is a lot for people to hold on to. By breaking it up into either smaller arcs or different pods, by introducing a set of antagonists and putting them down, or moving from space to space, our experience has been that it's something the viewers enjoy, and it makes it a little easier to digest when you're telling some of these stories." Whedon also noted it would depend on how the season would be "broken up in terms of airing. If everything is running back to back, it feels weird to start calling it different things... We will try to have it in bite-sized chunks." The season began airing its episodes on December 1, 2017, once Inhumans had aired its eight episodes, with the intent for all 22 episodes to air mostly uninterrupted; a short hiatus was taken for the airing of the 2018 Winter Olympics. The season ultimately was formed by two pod story arcs. The sixth and seventh seasons each featured 13 episodes.

Agents of S.H.I.E.L.D. has been licensed in 155 countries and territories: CTV holds the broadcast rights for Canada; Channel 4 aired the series in the United Kingdom for the first two seasons, before it moved to E4 for the third through sixth seasons, with season seven releasing on Disney+; in Australia, the series aired on Seven Network for the first two seasons, before moving to Fox8 starting with the third; and in New Zealand, the show airs on TV2. MyNetworkTV was awarded the series' syndication rights in the United States, and began broadcasting it in September 2016.

=== Home media ===
Season	DVD and Blu-ray release dates		
Season	Region 1	Region 2	Region 4
1	September 9, 2014	October 20, 2014	November 12, 2014
2	September 18, 2015	October 19, 2015	November 11, 2015
3	—N/a	January 30, 2017	March 1, 2017
4	—N/a	July 2, 2018	November 14, 2018
5	—N/a	October 1, 2018	April 10, 2019
6	—N/a	—N/a	—N/a
7	—N/a	—N/a	—N/a

The complete first season was first released on Blu-ray and DVD on September 9, 2014, with the complete second season released on September 18, 2015, as an Amazon.com exclusive. The first season was made available for streaming on Netflix in the United States on November 20, 2014, with the second season on June 11, 2015, the third on June 16, 2016, the fourth on June 15, 2017, the fifth on June 17, 2018, the sixth on September 1, 2019, and the seventh on October 30, 2020. The series was available on Netflix until February 28, 2022, before moving to Disney+ in the United States starting March 16; it was already available on Disney+ in other territories.

== Reception ==
=== Viewership and ratings ===
Viewership and ratings per season of Agents of S.H.I.E.L.D.
Season	Timeslot (ET)	Episodes	First aired		Last aired		TV season	Viewership rank	Avg. viewers (millions)	18–49 rank	Avg. 18–49 rating
Season	Timeslot (ET)	Episodes	Date	Viewers (millions)	Date	Viewers (millions)	TV season	Viewership rank	Avg. viewers (millions)	18–49 rank	Avg. 18–49 rating
1	Tuesday 8:00 pm	22	September 24, 2013	12.12	May 13, 2014	5.45	2013–14	43	8.31	20	3.0
2	Tuesday 9:00 pm	22	September 23, 2014	5.98	May 12, 2015	3.88	2014–15	76	7.09	32	2.7
3	Tuesday 9:00 pm	22	September 29, 2015	4.90	May 17, 2016	3.03	2015–16	85	5.52	47	2.0
4	Tuesday 10:00 pm	22	September 20, 2016	3.44	May 16, 2017	2.08	2016–17	110	4.22	70	1.5
5	Friday 9:00 pm	22	December 1, 2017	2.54	May 18, 2018	1.88	2017–18	133	3.57	97	1.1
6	Friday 8:00 pm	13	May 10, 2019	2.31	August 2, 2019	1.88	2018–19	N/A	N/A	N/A	N/A
7	Wednesday 10:00 pm	13	May 27, 2020	1.82	August 12, 2020	1.46	2019–20	N/A	N/A	N/A	N/A

In the United States, the premiere episode of Agents of S.H.I.E.L.D. earned a 4.7/14 rating in the 18- to 49-year-old demographic, with 12.12 million total viewers, making it the biggest network drama debut in four years. Though the series debuted to strong ratings against its competition, NCIS, its ratings declined considerably over the following two months, though it remained Tuesday's top show among men 18–49, and overall was the No. 3 show among upscale young adults behind Modern Family and The Big Bang Theory. It also enjoyed DVR recordings that, according to TV Guide, were "through the roof".

In March 2016, Alisha Grauso of Forbes discussed the series and its ratings, describing the show as having "never quite been the ratings hit for ABC that the network had hoped it would be... It's hard enough to write a film script that fits within the continuity of the larger Marvel Cinematic Universe, even harder to do it with a full-length TV season that must act as connective tissue to the larger world while still being its own thing." Grauso opined that the series' ratings may improve if it either focused on trying to be the best series it could be (with fewer connections to the films, like the Marvel's Netflix television series) or on just being "support and tie-in to the world of the Avengers". Grauso concluded, "The end result for either scenario is that, hopefully, ratings move up and stay up. In the first case, fans might be lost by the disconnect from the MCU, but a stronger storyline and more consistent writing would bring them and new fans back. In the second scenario, fans would tune in every week for fear of missing out on a bit of story that's important to the larger world."

In November 2018, Parrot Analytics, which measures "how viewers interact with a TV show's brand online, assessing everything from global file-sharing and peer-to-peer traffic to social media activity", ranked Agents of S.H.I.E.L.D. in the top 0.03 percent of in-demand television series worldwide, classify it as "Amazing". Series with similar demand included Better Call Saul, Criminal Minds, and Vikings, while Agents of S.H.I.E.L.D. had higher demand than series such as The Originals, Supergirl, Arrow, and Fear The Walking Dead. Agents of S.H.I.E.L.D. saw the season seven episode "A Trout in the Milk" earn a series low rating of 0.2 in the 18- to 49-year-old demographic, while fellow season seven episode "Brand New Day" earned the lowest initial viewers with 1.25 million.

=== Critical response ===
Critical response of Agents of S.H.I.E.L.D.
Season	Rotten Tomatoes
1	88% (72 reviews)
2	91% (33 reviews)
3	100% (22 reviews)
4	96% (25 reviews)
5	100% (23 reviews)
6	93% (15 reviews)
7	100% (15 reviews)

For the first season, the review aggregator website Rotten Tomatoes reported an 88% approval rating, with an average rating of 7.8/10 based on 72 reviews. The website's consensus reads, "Agents of S.H.I.E.L.D. is sure to please comic book fans, but the strong ensemble and brisk pacing help to make this better-than-average superhero show accessible to non-fanboys as well." Metacritic, which uses a weighted average, assigned a "generally favorable" score of 74 based on 33 reviews.

The second season has a 91% approval rating on Rotten Tomatoes, with an average score of 7.7/10 based on 33 reviews. The website's consensus reads, "Agents of S.H.I.E.L.D. relaxes into itself during its sophomore season, mitigating the show's growing pains by focusing on characters while amping up narrative thrills." The third season has a 100% approval rating on Rotten Tomatoes, with an average score of 8.2/10 based on 22 reviews. The website's consensus reads, "Still evolving in its third season, Agents of S.H.I.E.L.D. further hits its stride with a blend of thrills, humor, and heart."

The fourth season has a 96% approval rating on Rotten Tomatoes, with an average score of 7.8/10 based on 25 reviews. The website's consensus reads, "Agents of S.H.I.E.L.D. explores darker territory in its fourth season with the thrilling introduction of Ghost Rider, setting up an action-packed new chapter of Marvel's edgier mythologies." The fifth season has a 100% approval rating on Rotten Tomatoes, with an average score of 7.9/10 based on 23 reviews. The website's consensus reads, "Agents of S.H.I.E.L.D. swings for the fences with large-scale storytelling and wild twists that elevate season 5 from the saturated MCU and into its own space".

The sixth season has a 93% approval rating on Rotten Tomatoes, with an average score of 7.7/10 based on 15 reviews. The website's consensus reads, "Six seasons in and Agents of S.H.I.E.L.D. continues to deepen its exploration of space and the relationships between its heroes." The seventh season has a 100% approval rating on Rotten Tomatoes, with an average score of 8/10, based on 15 reviews. The website's consensus reads, "Heartfelt and held together by the strength of its super cast's chemistry, Agents of S.H.I.E.L.D.'s final season is a fitting farewell to a beloved team".

=== Analysis ===
The way that the series is affected by the events of Captain America: The Winter Soldier has been called "miraculous", with Terri Schwartz at Zap2it writing "the fact that the movie so influenced the show is game-changing in terms of how the mediums of film and television can be interwoven", while Mary McNamara of the Los Angeles Times stated that Agents of S.H.I.E.L.D. "faces a future of perpetual re-invention, and that puts it in the exhilarating first car of television's roller-coaster ride toward possible world domination". The fact that the series also depicts the rebuilding of S.H.I.E.L.D. in the MCU has also been highlighted, with Merrill Barr, reviewing "Beginning of the End" for Forbes, saying, "What Marvel's daring to say with this season finale is 'everything we do matters, and you need to pay attention to all of it.'"

The series' introduction of the Inhumans was seen by Oliver Sava of The A.V. Club as making Agents of S.H.I.E.L.D. an essential part of the MCU and Marvel Studios' plans, with the connections between the series and the films previously having always been reactive on the series' behalf, with "stuff" happening in the films and Agents of S.H.I.E.L.D. dealing with the fallout of it. However, the series would now be "making things happen, and these events will clearly impact the future of the MCU". Barr wrote that the series "does a most excellent job of standing on its own two feet in a way we've never seen it do before. Come the final frame [of the second season finale], all anyone—Marvel fan or otherwise—will be asking is when season three begins."

The third season's paralleling of themes from Captain America: Civil War was called "topical and relevant" and "downright eerie" by The A.V. Club's Alex McCown and ScreenCrush's Kevin Fitzpatrick. McCown compared the series' approach to setting up "a world distrustful of superpowers" to the real life events surrounding Cliven Bundy and Donald Trump's 2016 presidential campaign, and said that "S.H.I.E.L.D. is taking full advantage of its medium in order to tell the story the upcoming Captain America film can't: A full and fraught exploration of the need to protect freedom and privacy, even for those with extraordinary abilities." Fitzpatrick added that this "topical bent...made for a great angle to build up that world mentality without feeling particularly subservient to the movies".

Ahead of the fourth season, Collider's Kayti Burt opined that Agents of S.H.I.E.L.D. is "the X-Men TV show you should be watching". Burt noted that the X-Men film franchise was expanding to television with the series Legion, but that S.H.I.E.L.D. already served that purpose well, highlighting the similarities between the X-Men and the Inhumans, both creations of Stan Lee and Jack Kirby during the 1960s consisting of a large group of super-powered people who "are our neighbors and our friends ... both heroes and villains", and face "the same fears and prejudices" from the wider community. Burt felt that the similarities between S.H.I.E.L.D.'s Inhumans and the X-Men became "particularly pointed" in the third season with the Hive storyline, which had a lot in common with the film X-Men: Apocalypse that was released around the same time; Burt was of the opinion that S.H.I.E.L.D. executed the storyline "much better" than the film did. Other similarities Burt discussed were the series' diverse and ensemble cast, its take on the mutant cure storyline, the parallels between Daisy Johnson's second season arc and the introduction of Rogue in the first X-Men film, and its social and political commentary. With the latter, Burt also discussed the similarities between the Watchdogs and Donald Trump, calling it "not very subtle, but social commentary doesn't have to be. I appreciate that Agents of S.H.I.E.L.D. is attempting to comment on the current socio-political state of the country in a way that many of the other superhero TV shows don't even attempt to do. It's perhaps the show's most X-Men-like quality." Concluding, Burt said that though the X-Men characters cannot appear in the MCU due to 20th Century Fox holding the rights, "We still get to enjoy many of the themes prominent in the X-Men universe through S.H.I.E.L.D."

Additionally, Marc N. Kleinhenz at Screen Rant discussed how the series "continues to resist a status quo", from the destruction and rebuilding of S.H.I.E.L.D., to the fallout from the Sokovia Accords. He noted that a major driving force behind the changes was the MCU films, with the series being forced "to constantly adapt to a changing narrative landscape that it has absolutely no control over". He also believed that the series was obligated to adapt various Marvel characters to screen which would not be appearing in films, such as Daisy Johnson, Mockingbird, and Ghost Rider. However, Kleinheinz felt that this mindset also came from within the series crew rather than just from Marvel, saying, "there's also the storytelling modus operandi that showrunners Jed Whedon and Maurissa Tancharoen have very obviously demonstrated during their four-year tenure. It seems that constantly staking out new ground from season to season is just as much a personal predilection as it is, possibly, a corporate mandate."

During the Agents of Hydra pod in the fourth season, Collider's Evan Valentine noted how "[o]ne of the prevalent themes of this latter half of Agents of S.H.I.E.L.D.'s fourth season has been its jabs at the current Trump administration... When all's said and done, whether you support or disavow the current administration and what it's done with its time in office, does this commentary work here? Sure it does... We need to be able to laugh at what's going on in the world, regardless of whether we agree or disagree, but S.H.I.E.L.D. has managed to throw in some biting commentary this season."

Ahead of the seventh and final season Shakeema Edwards of Vulture felt the series had "evolved into a science-fiction fantasia... exploring human mutation, artificial intelligence, virtual reality, space exploration, time travel, and even magic". Edwards continued, "what's most fascinating about S.H.I.E.L.D. as it enters its endgame is how it's committed to the practice of essentially adopting a new subgenre every ten or so episodes, particularly later in its run". Constantly shifting its genre focus allowed the series to have fewer "filler episodes" and could "maintain its momentum within and between seasons". Additionally, "the characters' ever-deepening devotion to each other has served as an emotional through line, a constant for the characters (and viewers) to hold on to as the narrative rapidly changes around them". Edwards concluded: "S.H.I.E.L.D. is going out on its own terms with season seven, a coveted planned conclusion in a television landscape rife with sudden cancellations. Fittingly, the show that originally brought the world of the MCU to the small screen will also serve as an outro to the cinematic universe's first phase in television".

=== Accolades ===
The Atlantic named "4,722 Hours" one of the best television episodes of 2015. The fifth season was recognized with The ReFrame Stamp for hiring people of underrepresented gender identities, and of color.

Accolades received by Agents of SHIELD
Award	Year	Category	Recipient(s)	Result	Ref.
California On Location Awards	2016	Location Manager of the Year – One Hour Television	Justin Hill	Won	
California On Location Awards	2019	Assistant Location Manager – Television	Miles Beal-Ampah	Won	
Critics' Choice Television Awards	2013	Most Exciting New Series	Agents of S.H.I.E.L.D.	Won	
Dragon Awards	2017	Best Science Fiction or Fantasy TV Series	Agents of S.H.I.E.L.D.	Nominated	
Hollywood Post Alliance Awards	2018	Outstanding Visual Effects – Television (Over 13 Episodes)	Mark Kolpack, Sabrina Arnold, Kevin Yuille, David Rey, and Hnedel Maximore (for "Orientation: Part 1")	Won	
Irish Film & Television Awards	2016	Best Actress in a Supporting Role in Drama Television	Ruth Negga	Nominated	
Irish Film & Television Awards	2018	Actor in a supporting role – Drama	Jason O'Mara	Nominated	
Kids' Choice Awards	2015	Favorite Family TV Show	Agents of S.H.I.E.L.D.	Nominated	
Kids' Choice Awards	2015	Favorite TV Actress	Chloe Bennet	Nominated	
Kids' Choice Awards	2016	Favorite Family TV Show	Agents of S.H.I.E.L.D.	Nominated	
Kids' Choice Awards	2016	Favorite Female TV Star – Family Show	Chloe Bennet	Nominated	
Kids' Choice Awards	2016	Favorite Female TV Star – Family Show	Ming-Na Wen	Nominated	
Kids' Choice Awards	2017	Favorite Family TV Show	Agents of S.H.I.E.L.D.	Nominated	
People's Choice Awards	2014	Favorite Actress in a New TV Series	Ming-Na Wen	Nominated	
People's Choice Awards	2014	Favorite New TV Drama	Agents of S.H.I.E.L.D.	Nominated	
People's Choice Awards	2015	Favorite Network Sci-Fi/Fantasy TV Show	Agents of S.H.I.E.L.D.	Nominated	
Primetime Creative Arts Emmy Awards	2014	Outstanding Special and Visual Effects	"T.A.H.I.T.I."	Nominated	
Primetime Creative Arts Emmy Awards	2015	Outstanding Special and Visual Effects	"The Dirty Half Dozen"	Nominated	
PRISM Awards	2015	Television Drama Multi-Episode Storyline – Mental Health	Fitz's storyline from "Shadows" to "The Things We Bury"	Nominated	
Golden Reel Awards	2014	Best Sound Editing – Short Form: Music	"Pilot" - Lodge Worster	Nominated	
Golden Reel Awards	2017	TV – Short Form – Dialogue/ADR	"Deals with Our Devils"	Nominated	
Golden Reel Awards	2021	Outstanding Achievement in Sound Editing – Episodic Short Form – Dialogue/ADR	"What We're Fighting For"	Nominated	
Golden Reel Awards	2021	Outstanding Achievement in Sound Editing – Episodic Short Form – Effects / Foley	"What We're Fighting For"	Nominated	
Satellite Awards	2014	Best Television Series or Miniseries, Genre	Agents of S.H.I.E.L.D.	Nominated	
Saturn Awards	2014	Best Network Television Series Release	Agents of S.H.I.E.L.D.	Nominated	
Saturn Awards	2015	Best Superhero Adaptation Television Series	Agents of S.H.I.E.L.D.	Nominated	
Saturn Awards	2016	Best Superhero Adaptation Series	Agents of S.H.I.E.L.D.	Nominated	
Saturn Awards	2017	Best Superhero Adaptation Television Series	Agents of S.H.I.E.L.D.	Nominated	
Saturn Awards	2018	Best Superhero Television Series	Agents of S.H.I.E.L.D.	Nominated	
Teen Choice Awards	2014	Male Breakout Star	Brett Dalton	Won	
Teen Choice Awards	2015	Choice Fantasy/Sci-Fi Series	Agents of S.H.I.E.L.D.	Nominated	
Teen Choice Awards	2016	Choice TV Villain	Brett Dalton	Nominated	
Teen Choice Awards	2017	Choice Action TV Show	Agents of S.H.I.E.L.D.	Nominated	
Teen Choice Awards	2017	Choice Action TV Actor	Gabriel Luna	Nominated	
Teen Choice Awards	2018	Choice Action TV Show	Agents of S.H.I.E.L.D.	Nominated	
Teen Choice Awards	2018	Choice Action TV Actress	Chloe Bennet	Nominated	
Teen Choice Awards	2019	Choice Summer TV Actress	Chloe Bennet	Nominated	
Visual Effects Society Awards	2014	Outstanding Visual Effects in a Broadcast Program	"Pilot"	Nominated	
Visual Effects Society Awards	2015	Outstanding Visual Effects in a Photoreal Episode	Agents of S.H.I.E.L.D.	Nominated	
Visual Effects Society Awards	2018	Outstanding Visual Effects in a Photoreal Episode	Mark Kolpack, Sabrina Arnold, David Rey, Kevin Yuille, Gary D'Amico for "Orientation: Part 1"	Nominated	

== Spin-offs ==
=== Marvel's Most Wanted ===
By April 2015, Marvel was developing a spin-off series of Agents of S.H.I.E.L.D. Developed by Bell and writer Paul Zbyszewski, it would star Palicki and Blood. ABC passed on the project by May 7, 2015, when they announced their series renewals and cancellations, and new series pickups. In August 2015, the spin-off series received new life as a reworked series, titled Marvel's Most Wanted, with a pilot order. Hunter and Morse were written off Agents of S.H.I.E.L.D. in the episode "Parting Shot", both leaving S.H.I.E.L.D., as Palicki and Blood "physically had to go leave to shoot the pilot". In May 2016, the spin-off series was passed on by ABC once again.

=== Agents of S.H.I.E.L.D.: Slingshot ===
A six-part digital series, Marvel's Agents of S.H.I.E.L.D.: Slingshot, was revealed on December 6, 2016, to debut on ABC.com on December 13, 2016. It follows Elena "Yo-Yo" Rodriguez on a secret mission, shortly before the start of season four, with Cordova-Buckley reprising her role. Gregg, Jason O'Mara, Simmons, Bennet, Wen, De Caestecker and Henstridge all reprise their roles in the series as Coulson, Jeffrey Mace, Mack, Johnson, May, Fitz and Simmons, respectively.

=== Ghost Rider ===
In May 2019, Hulu ordered Marvel's Ghost Rider to series, with Ingrid Escajeda set as showrunner and executive producer alongside Zbyszewski and Loeb. Gabriel Luna was set to reprise his role of Robbie Reyes / Ghost Rider from the fourth season of Agents of S.H.I.E.L.D. in the new series. Rather than being a traditional spin-off from S.H.I.E.L.D., Hulu described the series as a new story that "lives unto its own" but is about the same character. In July 2019, Loeb confirmed that the new series would reference Reyes's role in Agents of S.H.I.E.L.D. In September 2019, it was announced that the series would not be going forward due to creative differences.

== Other media ==
At the 2014 San Diego Comic-Con, Marvel Comics announced an ongoing series titled S.H.I.E.L.D., to be set in the mainstream Marvel Universe and written by Mark Waid, beginning that December. Featuring art by a rotating group of artists including Carlos Pacheco, Alan Davis, and Chris Sprouse, the series is led by Agent Phil Coulson, and sees the canonical introduction of the characters Melinda May, Jemma Simmons, and Leo Fitz—who originated from the television series—to the Marvel comics universe, who Waid noted would be given "the Marvel Universe spin". Waid described the series as "done-in-one. Coulson and his team have a mission, and if we need someone for a mission, everyone in the Marvel Universe is available as a potential Agent". Waid added that though the comic does not share events with the television series, it maintains the characters' relationships and personalities. Marc Guggenheim relaunched the comic as Agents of S.H.I.E.L.D. for Marvel Comics' All-New, All-Different Marvel line, and introduced the television series' character Grant Ward to the Marvel comic universe in May 2016.

In September 2015, Phil Coulson, Daisy Johnson / Quake, Deathlok, Melinda May, Bobbi Morse, Lincoln Campbell, Sif, Raina and Gordon were announced to appear in the Marvel: Future Fight mobile role-playing video game. Their inclusion in the game was done to promote the start of the third season, as well as to allow Marvel to "extend storylines and build on backstories to engage fans in a brand-new experience", according to Marvel Games creative director Bill Rosemann. In March 2016, de Caestecker and Henstridge reprised their roles as Fitz and Simmons, respectively, in the episode "Lizards", of the animated series Ultimate Spider-Man vs the Sinister 6. Also in the month, Agents of S.H.I.E.L.D. downloadable content was revealed for Lego Marvel's Avengers. The content consisted of a mission based "on the events leading up to the season two finale", which involved facing Jiaying and Daisy in Afterlife while rescuing agents, as well as going up against Gordon and Cal Johnson who have occupied the S.H.I.E.L.D. Helicarrier. The content includes the playable characters Daisy Johnson, Leo Fitz, Agent Koenig, Melinda May, Bobbi Morse, Jemma Simmons, Cal Johnson / Mr. Hyde, Deathlok, Gordon, Grant Ward, Jiaying, Lincoln, and Raina, as well as the airplane the Bus. Ming-Na Wen reprised her role as Melinda May to provide new dialogue for the content.
