= Stavros Flatley =

Dance duo

Stavros Flatley are a British-Cypriot father-son dance duo consisting of Demetri and his son Michalis 'Lagi' Demetriou, best known for appearing on the third series of Britain's Got Talent in 2009. They reached the final of the series, finishing fourth behind Diversity, Susan Boyle and Julian Smith.

The name of their act is derived from Irish-American dancer Michael Flatley, best known for Irish dance shows including Riverdance and Lord of the Dance, and Stavros, a Greek kebab shop owner with fractured English who was portrayed by Harry Enfield on Channel 4's television comedy and music show Saturday Live.

Following their appearance on Britain's Got Talent, the act appeared in the second series of Sugar Free Farm.

== Appearances ==
- Britain’s Got Talent (2009)
- Britain's Got Talent: The Champions (2019)
- Britain’s Got Talent Christmas Spectacular (2020)

== Career ==
Stavros Flatley started their careers when Demetri owned a Greek restaurant in North London. The cabaret performances were especially successful. It was at the restaurant that Demetri developed the Stavros Flatley duo.

The duo have since split and Lagi now lives in Paphos and runs a barbershop. Demitri runs the Octopus Water Sports in Kato Paphos.

In 2026, Demetri Demetriou appeared in Cyprus' entree for Eurovision in the music video for the song Jalla by Antigoni.
