= British Rail Class 390 =

Type of electric high-speed train

British Rail Class 390 Pendolino
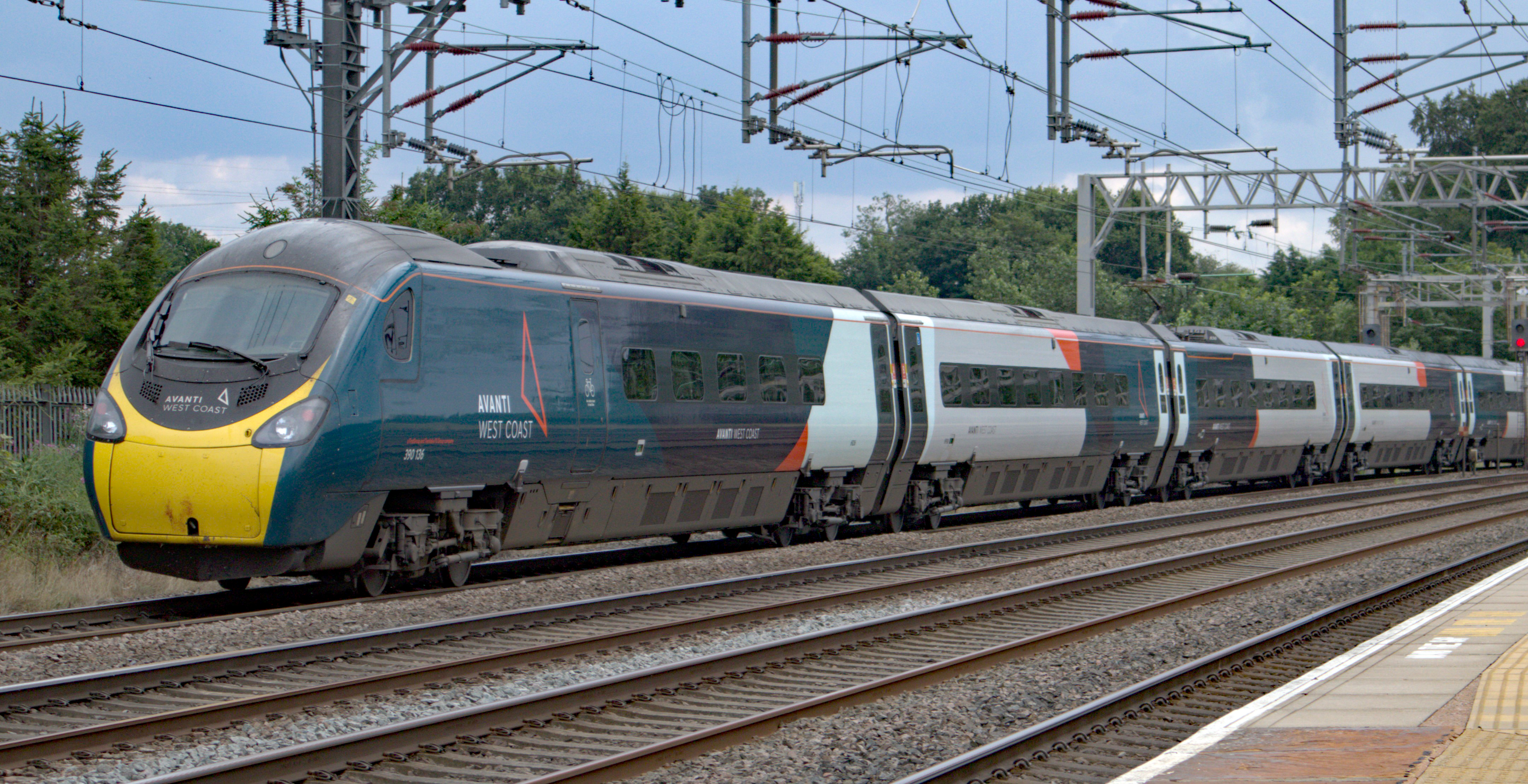
- Avanti West Coast Class 390 passing Rugeley Trent Valley

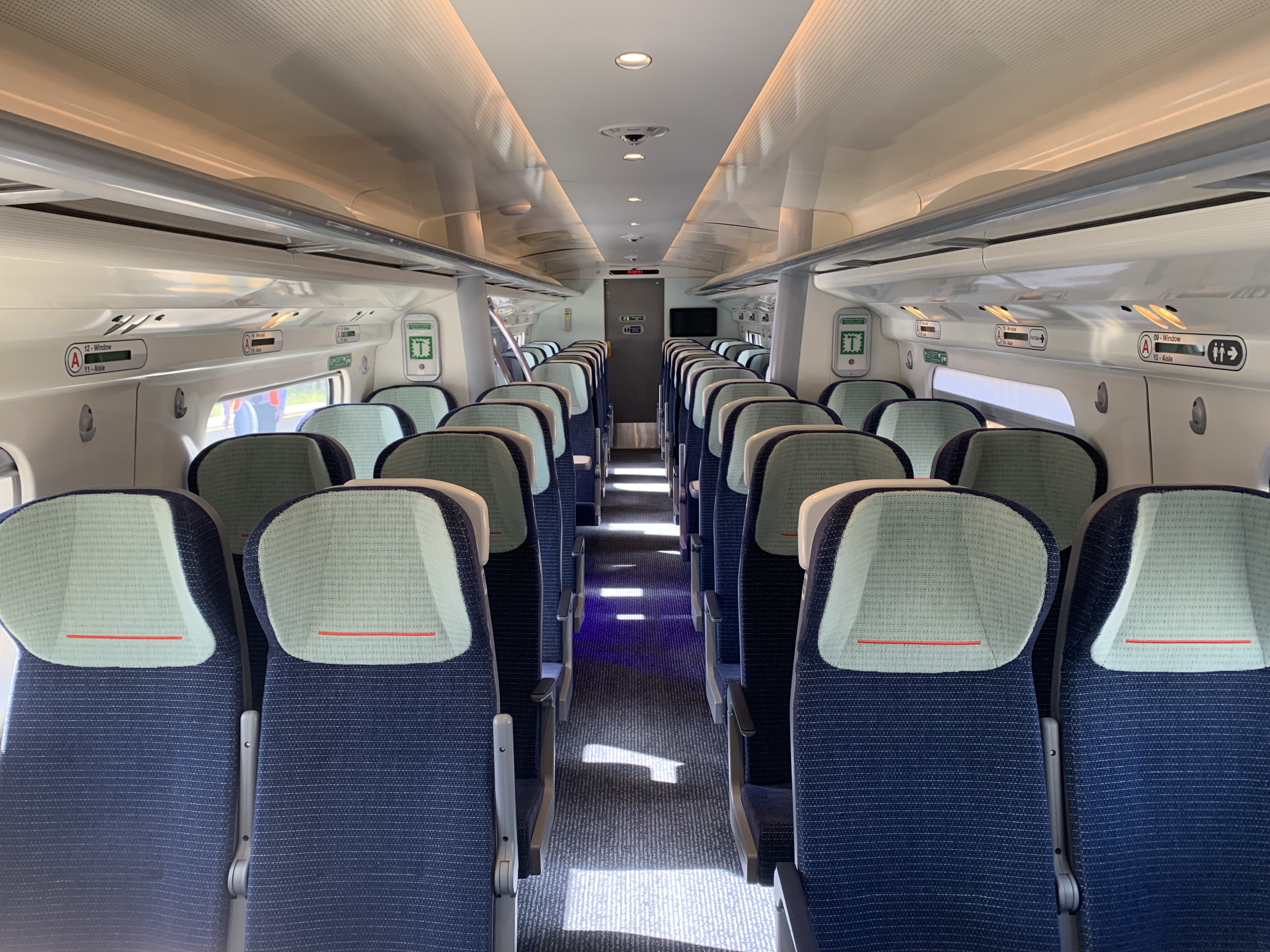
- The refurbished standard-class interior of a Class 390 unit
- Stock type: Electric multiple unit
- In service: 23 July 2002 – present
- Manufacturers: Alstom; Fiat Ferroviaria
- Built at: Washwood Heath, Birmingham; Savigliano, Italy
- Family name: Pendolino
- Replaced: Class 86, 87 & 90 locomotives and Mk 2 & Mk 3 carriages
- Constructed: 2001–2005; 2010–2012
- Refurbished: 2021–2024
- Number built: 57; (22 × 390/0, 35 × 390/1)
- Number in service: 56
- Number scrapped: 1
- Predecessor: Class 86; Class 87; Class 90
- Formation: Operate as 9-car or 11-car units (DMRFO-MFO-PTFO-MFO-(TSO)-(MSO)-TSO-MSO-PTSRMB-MSO-DMSO)
- Fleet numbers: (See § Fleet details)
- Capacity: 390/0: 469 seats; (99 first-class, 370 standard); 390/1 pre-refurb: 589 seats; (145 first-class, 444 standard); 390/1 post-refurb: 607 seats; (99 first-class, 508 standard)
- Owner: Angel Trains
- Operators: Current: Avanti West Coast; Former: Virgin Trains
- Depots: Primary: Longsight (Manchester); Secondary: Edge Hill (Liverpool), Oxley (Wolverhampton), Polmadie (Glasgow), Wembley (London)
- Lines served: West Coast Main Line, Blackpool North Line

Specifications
- Car body construction: Aluminium (friction stir welded)
- Train length: 390/0: 217.5 m (713 ft 7 in); 390/1: 265.3 m (870 ft 5 in)
- Car length: DM cars: 25.1 m (82 ft 4 in); Others: 23.9 m (78 ft 5 in)
- Width: 2.73 m (8 ft 11 in)
- Height: 3.56 m (11 ft 8 in)
- Doors: Single-leaf sliding plug
- Wheel diameter: 920–860 mm (36–34 in) (new–worn)
- Wheelbase: Bogies: 2.70 m (8 ft 10 in)
- Maximum speed: 125 mph (200 km/h)
- Weight: 390/0: 466 tonnes (459 long tons; 514 short tons); 390/1: 567 tonnes (558 long tons; 625 short tons)
- Traction system: Alstom Onix 800 IGBT
- Traction motors: 2 × Alstom 4 EJA 2852 per motor car (430 kW (580 hp) each)
- Power output: 390/0: 5,160 kW (6,920 hp); 390/1: 6,020 kW (8,070 hp)
- Electric system: 25 kV 50 Hz AC overhead
- Current collection: Pantograph
- UIC classification: (See § Consist)
- Bogies: Fiat-SIG or Alstom CL 623
- Braking systems: Electro-pneumatic (disc) and rheostatic/regenerative
- Safety systems: AWS; TASS; TPWS
- Coupling system: Dellner 12 (for rescue only)
- Multiple working: Not provided
- Track gauge: 4 ft 8 1/2 in (1,435 mm) standard gauge

The British Rail Class 390 Pendolino is a type of electric high-speed passenger train operated by Avanti West Coast in Great Britain, leased from Angel Trains. They are electric multiple units, using Fiat Ferroviaria's tilting train Pendolino technology and built by Alstom.

Fifty-three eight-car units were originally built between 2001 and 2005 for operation on the West Coast Main Line (WCML). The trains of the original batch were the last to be assembled at Alstom's Washwood Heath plant, before its closure in 2005. The trains were subsequently extended to nine cars in the mid-2000s. Some trains were lengthened further to 11 cars in the 2010s, being renumbered as the subclass 390/1. An additional batch of four 11-car trains were built in Italy.

The Class 390 Pendolino has a design speed of 140 mph (225 km/h); however, limitations to track signalling systems restrict the trains to a maximum speed of 125 mph (200 km/h) in service. The fleet is maintained at Longsight TMD near Manchester Piccadilly station.

In 2021, a £117 million refurbishment programme to upgrade the fleet to as new condition began; this has included conversion of one first-class carriage (Coach G) on the 11 coach Pendolinos to an unreserved standard class to increase capacity, adding power sockets and new customer information screens.

== Background ==
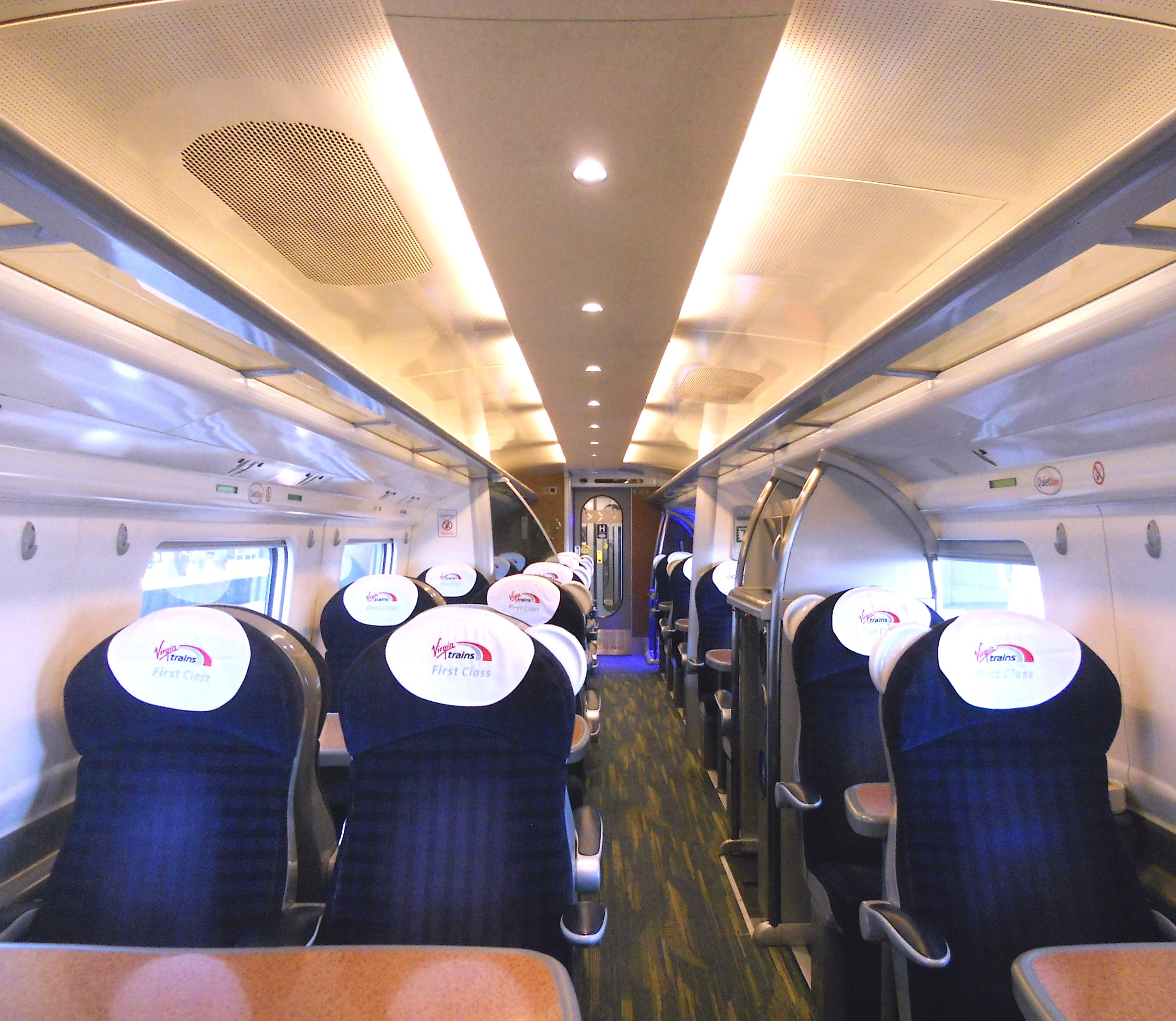
The Virgin Trains First Class interior in 2015

During 1997, private operator Virgin Rail Group started operating the InterCity West Coast franchise, taking over from state-owned operator British Rail. Virgin had been awarded the franchise having made a commitment to replace the locomotives and rolling stock in use on the route, namely the classes 86, 87 and 90 electric locomotives and Mark 2 and Mark 3 coaching stock, with brand new tilting trains. Following negotiations with several manufacturers, Virgin placed an order with Alstom/Fiat Ferroviaria to produce the envisioned tilting train, which was known by the name Pendolino and was later designated under TOPS as the Class 390.

The purpose of tilt on the Pendolino was to maintain passenger comfort levels when traversing curves at high speed by reducing the sideways forces on the train's occupants, minimising their tendency to slide across the carriage. The train was designed to be visually impressive: the concept design for the Pendolino was originally produced by industrial design firm Priestman Goode in cooperation with JHL and Start Design and many aspects of the finished product, such as the shaping of its aerodynamic nose and much of the train's interior areas, can be attributed to them.

The concept of deploying tilting trains on the West Coast Main Line was not an original one. During the 1980s and 1990s, British Rail had developed several plans to introduce new trains and pursued the development of the revolutionary, but ultimately unsuccessful, Class 370 Advanced Passenger Train (APT) for a protracted period. Some years after the cancellation of the APT, British Rail had intended to replace the existing fleet of trains on the West Coast Main Line (in conjunction with a planned route modernisation) as part of the InterCity 250 project, but this was cancelled by the government shortly before the privatisation of British Rail during the late 1990s.

The original Pendolino order was for 54 nine-car units, costing £500 million. As originally planned, a pre-series test train was scheduled to be completed and to be in active testing by July 2000, while the first Pendolino was to enter revenue service during March 2001. It was expected that the whole fleet would be delivered by May 2002.

The Pendolinos were intended to run at service speeds of up to 140 mph (225 km/h). Railtrack, therefore, embarked on a modernisation of the West Coast Main Line to allow for the faster line speeds. However, the programme ran into serious difficulties. By its end, it was almost four times over-budget, had been delayed by a number of years, and had not improved the infrastructure as much as had been planned. Consequently, and in a manner reminiscent of the introduction of the InterCity 225, the lack of signalling upgrades resulted in the maximum line speed being set at 125 mph (200 km/h). Although the Pendolino's in-service top speed is well below British Rail's hopes for the APT, which was to reach up to 155 mph (250 km/h), it does match the maximum speed of 125 mph for the APT in passenger service.

Fiat Ferroviaria introduced its first tilting trains during the 1970s. They were first operated on the Italian railways in 1976. Fiat Ferroviaria supplied much of the content of the Class 390, including the unit's bodyshell and the bogies, while final assembly was carried out at Washwood Heath. The tilting technology was developed by SIG Switzerland (later Fiat-SIG, today Alstom). Each car uses a pair of electromechanical actuators to achieve the desired tilting angle. The train can tilt to a maximum of eight degrees, at which point one side of the train is 380 mm (15 in) higher above the track than the other. In contrast to other Fiat Ferroviaria tilting trains which use hydraulic tilting actuators, the electromechanical system offers lower maintenance cost and higher efficiency.

== Design ==
=== Overview ===
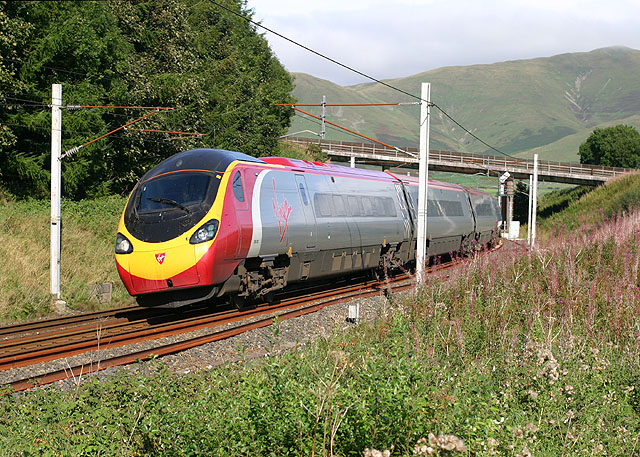
A Virgin Trains Pendolino tilting into one of the many curves on the northern part of the WCML

The Pendolino is a high-speed electric multiple unit train, which incorporates Fiat Ferroviaria's tilting train Pendolino technology. According to Ian Scoley of the design firm Priestman Goode, the design of the Pendolino is "more reminiscent of an aircraft than a train". It has a maximum design speed of 140 mph (225 km/h), which requires compatible infrastructure to do so. A nine-carriage Pendolino reportedly weighs around 471 tonnes, which is equivalent to a dozen fully laden lorries. The structure of the Pendolino is largely composed of extruded aluminium panels; allegedly, this material is responsible for the train's exterior surface being considerably smoother than its steel counterparts. The cross-section of the bodyshell is deliberately tapered; the need for this shaping is imposed by the train's ability to tilt around corners. To avoid the risk of striking passing trains or static structures while a carriage is being tilted, the body must be narrower towards the top than it is at wheel height.

The nose of the Pendolino is manufactured out of composite materials and moulded in a similar fashion as has been used to produce the shells of racing cars. This construction methodology has been claimed to have been readily compatible with the aerodynamic contouring techniques practised while also retaining considerable structural strength. Allegedly, at one stage of development, the nose was intended to taper as far forwards as 7 m (23 ft), similar to the noses of Japanese bullet trains. However, as the design was refined, this was reduced to a tapering length of just 3.5 m (11 ft 6 in) due to design constraints, while a roof fairing extends the curvature rearwards by a further 3 m (9 ft 10 in), located directly above and behind the driver's windscreen. To validate its performance, the forward section of the trains was subject to considerable aerodynamic testing to prove its suitability for high-speed operations.

=== Tilting ===
The Pendolino features an actively actuated tilt system. Each of the carriages can tilt up to eight degrees from the vertical; this is done to manage the forces imposed between high speed trains and the track while traversing corners. On top of this, the lines of the Network Rail network are often canted up to six degrees, akin to a shallow-banked velodrome; when combined with the Pendolino's tilt system, the train can reportedly comfortably take curves at a 20 per cent greater speed than it otherwise would be able to do so.

The active tilting mechanism is achieved using electrically operated tilt activators, which are situated under each carriage. Unlike some alternative systems, which are pre-programmed to tilt at sections of a pre-determined route, the Pendolino's tilt system actively detects the upcoming corners using sensors and tilts appropriately to correspond. As tilting may not be appropriate or possible at some locations along the route, such as when travelling close to bridges and tunnels, the tilt mechanism can be disabled by an onboard system, called the Tilt Authorisation and Speed Supervision (TASS). This system relies upon trackside beacons, which are typically spaced around 5 miles (8.0 km) from one another, to transmit data to the train; this information, as well as temporarily locking-out the tilting mechanism from being used on relevant stretches of track, also relays the maximum permissible speeds for the adjacent corners.

=== Safety ===
The Pendolino incorporates several different onboard safety systems, including the Automatic Warning System (AWS) and the Train Protection Warning System (TPWS); it was also planned to install compatible equipment for the European Train Control System (ETCS). These systems automatically deliver situational warnings regarding the relevant signals and speed limits to the driver and, if not reacted to appropriately, are able to bring the train to a complete halt. Unlike most trains, it also features a Tilt Authorisation and Speed Supervision (TASS) system, which is used to control the onboard tilting mechanism. In the event of an accident, each Pendolino also incorporates a black box data recorder. Another structural measure designed to help dissipate the forces involved in an incident involving a severe collision, are the crush zones, which can reportedly absorb three times the forces of existing High Speed Trains.

The Pendolino features relatively shallow windows in comparison to trains such as the Voyager; visually, the windows are linked by a black livery line to form a continuous band running along the length of the train. A combination of structural constraints and internal configuration selections had determined the narrowness of the windows; the adoption of larger windows would have intrinsically weakened the bodyshell of each carriage. Reportedly, consideration was given to the adoption of asymmetric window layout during the design process, but this was ultimately discarded in favour of the arrangement used in service instead.

Due to these design choices, the Pendolino has a very high level of structural integrity. In the Grayrigg derailment incident, where the unit involved was travelling at a speed of 95 mph (150 km/h) and derailed at a set of points sending the carriages off the track and down a bank, one died and 30 were seriously injured from the 104 passengers and four crew. This low fatality number is attributed to the strength and safety of the unit.

=== Traction systems ===
The Pendolino's propulsion system incorporates Alstom's Onix traction drive system, which controls 12 separate traction motors, each capable of providing up to 570 horsepower (430 kW). Traction motors are suspended from the underside of the carriage bodies and connected to the driving wheels using a Cardan shaft and transfer gearbox thus lowering the unsprung mass and consequent track wear at high speeds, a feature inherited from its APT ancestor. Combined, they are capable of producing a rate of acceleration of up to 0.43 ms^{−2}, which enables the train to accelerate from stationary to 60 mph (100 km/h) in just over 60 seconds. Power for each Pendolino is supplied in the form of 25,000 volts AC, and is delivered via the overhead catenary infrastructure installed across its route. A particularly unusual measure, which was adopted to account for the train's tilting ability, is incorporated into the pantograph, the roof-mounted mechanism which connects the train to the overhead wires; it also features an active tilting system, which moves the pantograph to a precise angle in opposition to the direction of the carriages' tilt, allowing contact with the overhead catenary to be smoothly maintained.

=== Passenger amenities ===
The Pendolino features a number of amenities and innovations, such as a walk-in shop in place of the traditional buffet/restaurant car and the extensive presence of passenger visual information systems, which are installed on both the inside of the car ends and on the outside of the doors themselves. In response to criticisms of the pressure-operated automatic gangway doors fitted to the Mark 3 and Mark 4 carriages (which could easily be held open by items of luggage resting on the floor sensor, allowing draughts into the passenger saloon), the gangway doors of the Pendolino have press buttons instead. To assist the boarding process, the doors deploy folding steps at stations.

Originally, every seat had an integrated on-board entertainment system, which featured radio stations, including Virgin Radio, several BBC stations and a number of pre-recorded music channels. Listings booklets were provided on board and headphones could be purchased at the shop. During March 2010, this system was replaced by onboard Wi-Fi from T-Mobile. First class passengers were provided with a 240 volt mains power socket at each seat.

The Pendolino uses an electronic seat reservations system. Each seat has a small dot-matrix LCD installed near the top. If the seat is reserved, the display shows the station the seat is booked from until the train leaves that station; it subsequently displays "Available unless occupied". The display can also show the name of the passenger if this has been entered at the time of booking. This information is provided by the onboard Train Management System (TMS), which downloads current data via mobile operator Vodafone’s wireless network from the national Customer Reservation System shared by all train operators. The TMS is also used to provide route information to the passenger visual information systems. If a train is rescheduled, the system can rapidly be updated and the displayed information changed to reflect the new schedule.

=== Consist ===
The original 53-unit Pendolino fleet was delivered in nine-car formation (although some units initially operated as eight-car units), with vehicles built at the former Metro-Cammell Washwood Heath plant (by then owned by Alstom), in Birmingham. Thirty-one units were later extended to 11-car formation, with the addition of two new carriages (the 653xx Trailer (Car U) and the 689xx Motor (Car F)), built by Alstom at Savigliano in Italy. Units that had been extended were renumbered into the 390/1 range by having 100 added to their original unit numbers (for example, 390003 became 390103).

== Operations ==
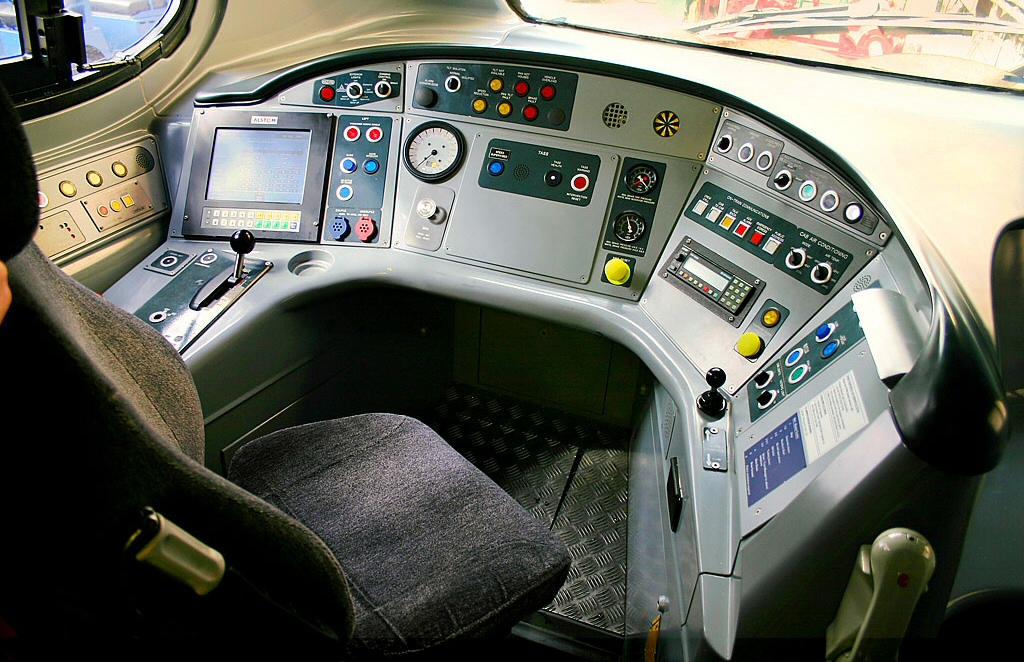
Interior of the cab of a Class 390

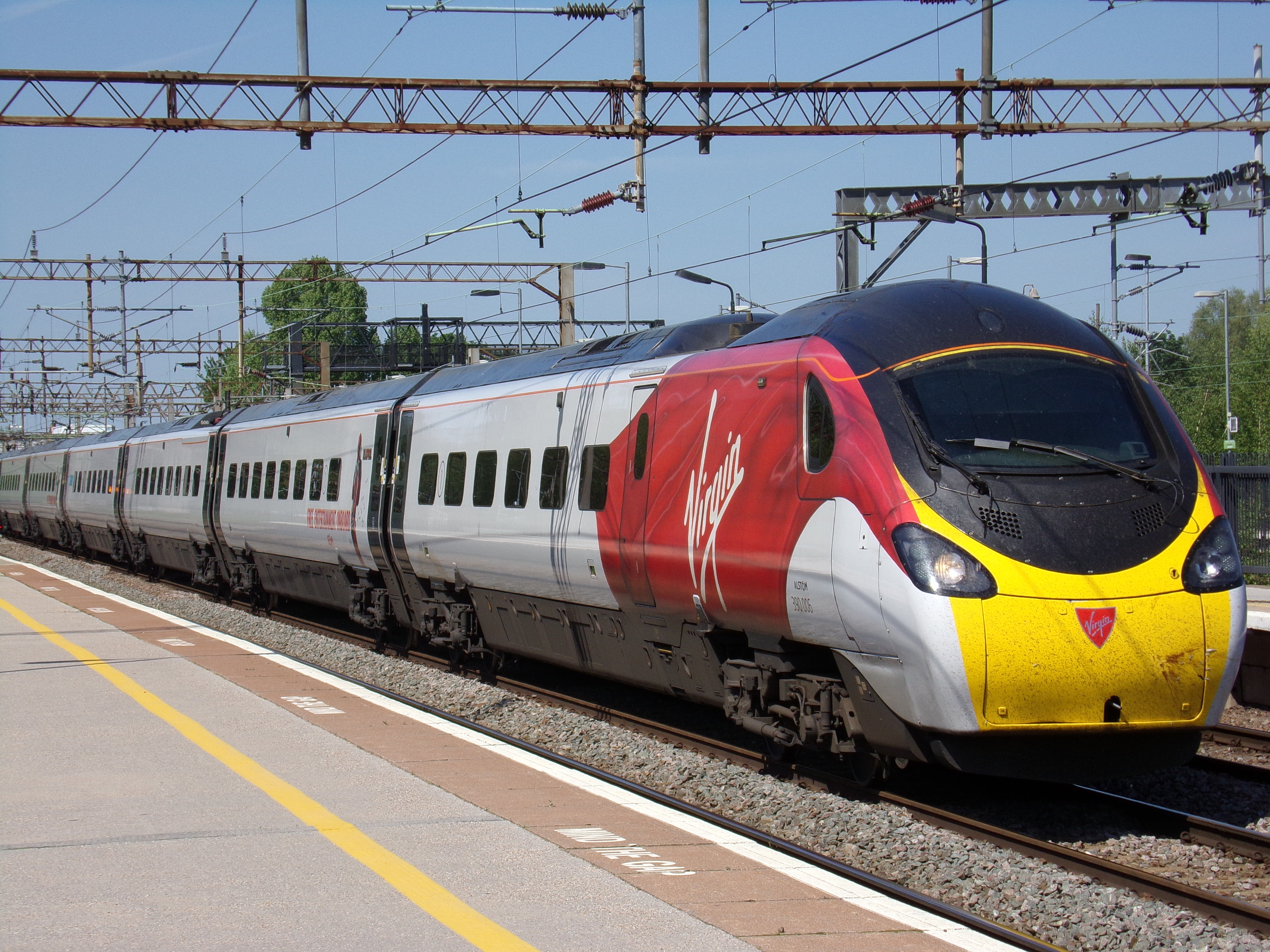
A Virgin Trains Class 390 at Northampton in flowing silk livery

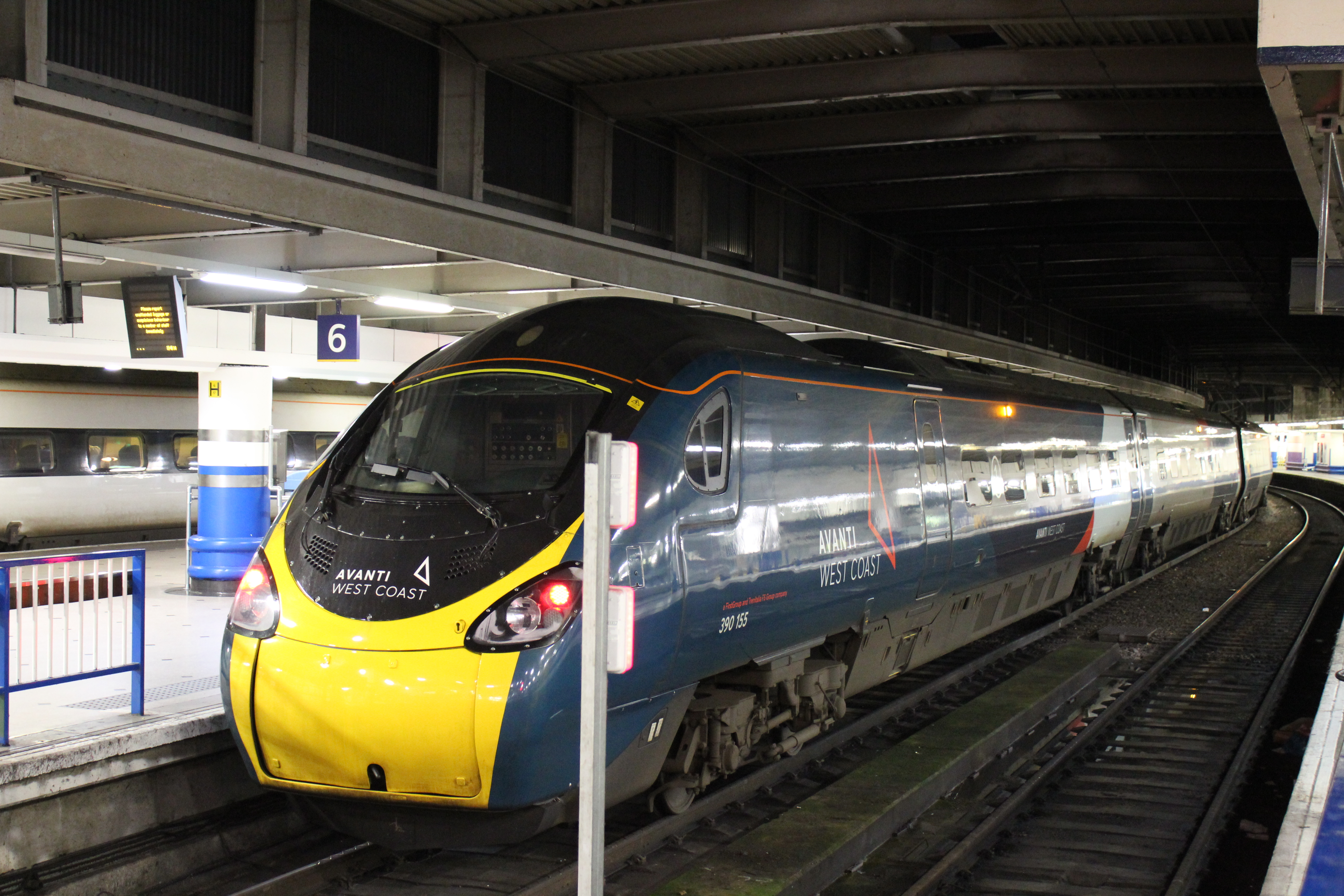
An Avanti West Coast Class 390 at London Euston

The service introduction of the Pendolino was repeatedly delayed, a fact which has been attributed to the poor project management and the collapse of infrastructure owner Railtrack. The fleet was introduced into passenger services from Birmingham International to Manchester Piccadilly on 23 July 2002 to coincide with the opening of the 2002 Commonwealth Games in Manchester. During the Games, they operated a daily return service between the two cities; however, it was not until 27 January 2003 that the first Pendolino carried passengers between London Euston and Manchester Piccadilly.

During 2004, the fleet's sphere of operation was expanded further. Pendolinos started to operate services to Glasgow Central and, by the end of summer in theory, all services north of Preston were worked by Class 390 units. This allowed the final Class 90 locomotives to be withdrawn and inroads were made into the main Class 87 fleet.

Another development during 2004 was the clearing of the units for the North Wales Coast Line from Crewe to Holyhead. This line is not electrified, so Virgin's Class 57/3 Thunderbird diesel locomotives were used to haul the Pendolinos. After Virgin Trains lost the CrossCountry franchise, the company decided to allocate its remaining Class 221 Super Voyagers to the coastal line, ending the practice of hauling Pendolinos from Crewe and thus making several Class 57 locomotives redundant. These locomotives have special Dellner coupling adaptors and electrical systems to make them compatible with Pendolino trains, allowing failed units to be rescued quicker. The Class 57s are also used when engineering works force Pendolino services to run over non-electrified diversionary routes.

The entire Pendolino fleet is allocated to Alstom's Manchester Traincare Centre at Longsight, where heavy maintenance is carried out. Longsight has a hoist on which an entire Pendolino unit can be lifted. Lighter maintenance, cleaning and overnight stabling are carried out at Alstom's other centres: Wembley (London), Oxley (Wolverhampton), Edge Hill (Liverpool) and Polmadie (Glasgow).

=== Problems and incidents ===
In October 2004, a train overshot the platform at Liverpool Lime Street station and collided with the buffer stops, and a similar incident occurred a few weeks later at the same station. The Rail Safety and Standards Board's inquiry into the incident identified a software glitch in the wheel-slip protection (WSP) system whereby the train's friction brakes were inhibited at low speeds after prolonged coasting (such as that occurring on approach to a station). The units were limited to 110 mph (180 km/h) for a short period until modifications to the software were made.

As a result of the smaller cabin dimensions necessitated by the tilting geometry, the higher floor needed to package the tilting mechanisms themselves, and the need to provide disabled toilets, the units have a lower seating capacity than the nine-car Mark 2 and Mark 3 rakes that they replaced. The result has been severe overcrowding on some services, something that Virgin somewhat mitigated through the increased frequency of service, and with the increase to 11-car formations.

The smaller size of the Pendolino windows has attracted comment and, in fact, the window size is unprecedented for British railway rolling stock. The wider window pillars mean that in some standard class carriages, 22.5% of the seats are parallel with either no window or only a limited portion of one; however the roll-over strength of the bodyshell was commented on regarding the crashworthiness performance of the train in the RAIB Accident Report into the derailment at Grayrigg.

=== Grayrigg derailment ===
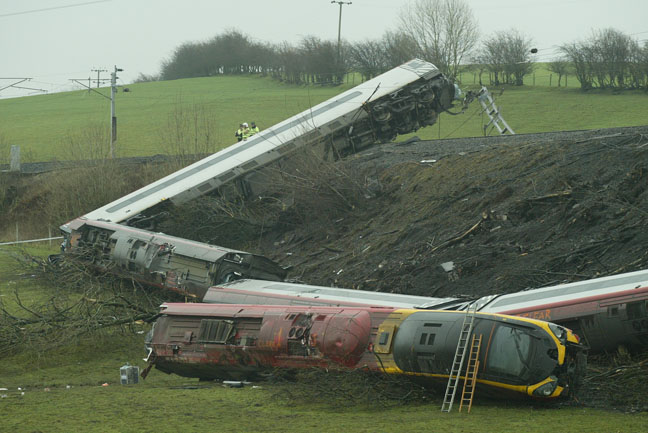
The scene at the Grayrigg derailment

On 23 February 2007, a faulty set of points caused a Virgin Trains Pendolino to derail near Grayrigg, in Cumbria. The train, unit 390033, named City of Glasgow, formed the 17:15 departure from London Euston bound for Glasgow Central. 115 people were on board, one of whom died from trauma suffered in the crash. The train's excellent crashworthiness was credited with preventing more fatalities.

The train was formally written off on 30 November 2007, owing to the prohibitive cost of repair against the price of a new unit; a driving car and carriage from the train were subsequently put into use for training purposes at the Virgin Trains Talent Academy in Crewe. Virgin Trains then leased a Class 90, Mk3 coaches and a Driving Van Trailer, all painted in Virgin's new livery, and nicknamed the Pretendolino by Alstom maintenance staff, as a temporary replacement for the written-off train. Occasionally, the name even appeared in official communications. Subsequently, the set was handed back to the leasing company.

=== Shap derailment ===
On 3 November 2025, an Avanti West Coast Pendolino derailed at Shap after running into a landslide obstructing the line. The train, unit 390117, was operating the 04:27 Glasgow Central to London Euston service.

== Speed records and special runs ==
In September 2006, a Pendolino completed the fastest ever southbound run along the 401 mi (645 km) length of the West Coast Main Line from Glasgow Central to London Euston, at 3 hours and 55 minutes. The previous record was 4 hours and 14 minutes, set in 1981 by the Pendolino's ancestor, British Rail's Advanced Passenger Train (APT).

In June 2021, another record-breaking attempt was made with a Pendolino, this time in the northbound direction. It completed the journey in 3 hours, 53 minutes and 1 second; faster than the 2006 Pendolino run, but narrowly missing the APT's northbound record, which stands at 3 hours, 52 minutes and 40 seconds.

Though the trains are limited to a maximum of 125 mph in service, faster runs have been made in 2003 when the trains were in the final stages of testing before introduction to service. On night-time runs between Rugby, Nuneaton and Lichfield Trent Valley, 390002 achieved a record speed for the class of 145.7 mph (234.5 km/h), as witnessed by Modern Railways magazine.

On 31 July 2026, a Pendolino operated into London Paddington under its own power to mark the first anniversary of the Greatest Gathering. It was hauled from Wembley to West Ealing by a Class 57 locomotive due to the link between the West Coast and Great Western Main Line lacking electrification. The train then operated on its own power to London Paddington using the overhead wires where it was displayed alongside a Great Western Railway Class 800 'Intercity Express Train' and a Class 57 locomotive, before returning to West Ealing. This marks the first time a Pendolino has ever operated on the Great Western Main Line.

== Fleet developments ==
=== Additional capacity ===
Following a large increase in passenger numbers following the WCML modernisation, the Department for Transport announced a capacity increase by procuring additional units (with one intended to replace the unit damaged at Grayrigg). Four new units have been built with 11 cars, and 31 existing units lengthened to 11 cars.

This required major changes to stations and depots to accommodate the 11-car units. Virgin Rail Projects was set up to introduce these new trains with the new franchise winner as well as Alstom, Network Rail and the current franchise holder, Virgin Trains West Coast, to ensure the new units were able to run from 1 April 2012.

The additional vehicles were manufactured in Alstom's Savigliano factory in Italy because Washwood Heath works had closed.

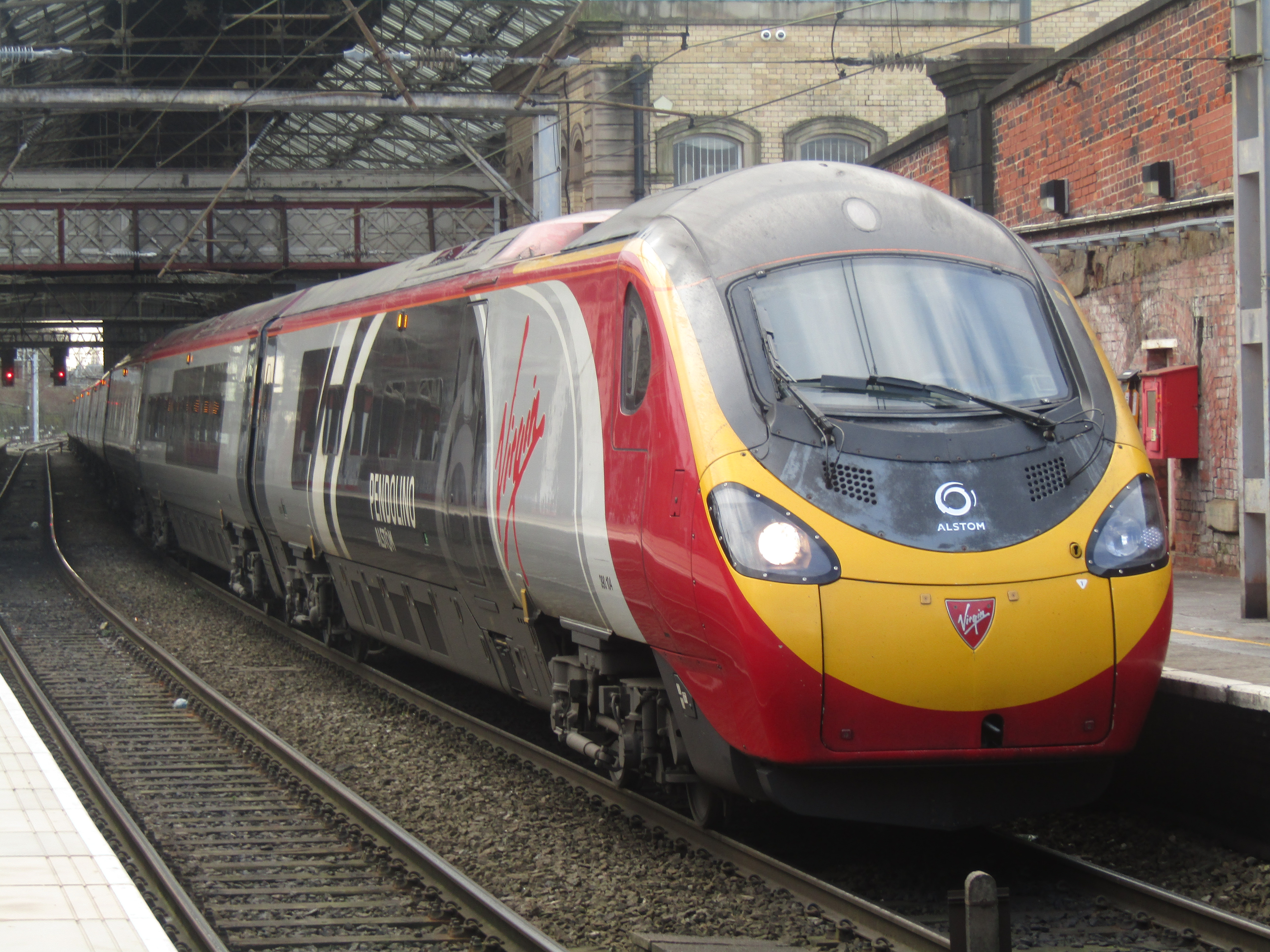
Virgin Trains Class 390 Alstom Pendolino at Preston in 2017

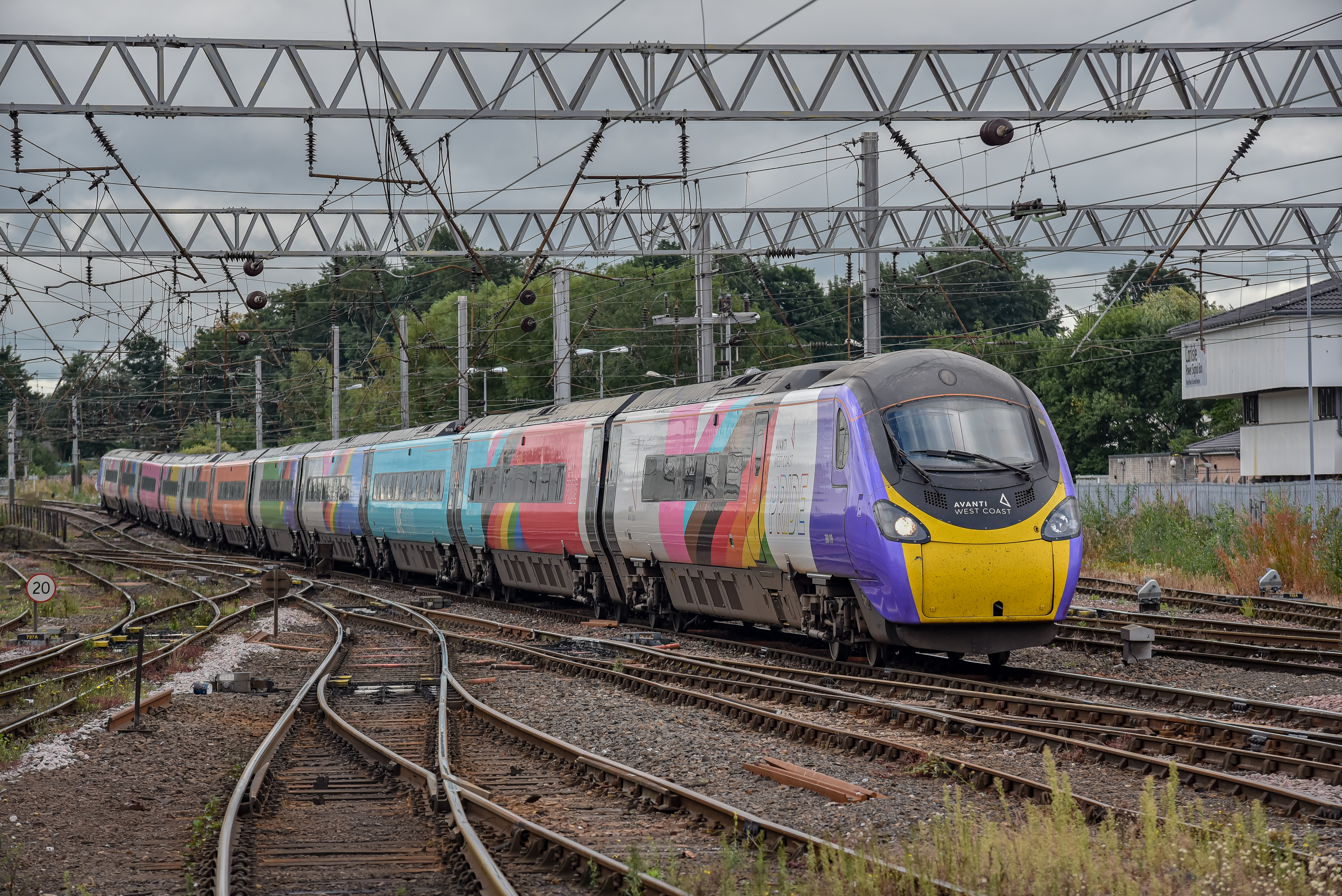
Avanti West Coast Class 390 Progress at Carlisle in 2021

The first new units were built with 11 cars and delivered via the Channel Tunnel to Edge Hill. The first was accepted on 12 July 2011.

In March 2012, unit 390055 operated a test run on the East Coast Main Line from Edinburgh Waverley to London King's Cross.

With the franchise process in place, and Virgin Trains' franchise extended until December 2012, the first 11-car unit (390156) entered service on 5 April 2012. The remaining new units were brought into service, and 31 units increased to 11 carriages, over the next eight months. The lengthening project was completed in December 2012.

=== Reconfiguration of nine-car units ===
As part of the subsequent extension of the franchise until April 2017, Virgin Trains made further enhancements to the Pendolinos. The 21 nine-car units each had one first class carriage converted to standard class. This work was completed by September 2015.

=== Proposed order by Alliance Rail Operations ===
In its successful submission to operate services from London Euston to Blackpool North, Alliance Rail Holdings proposed purchasing four Class 390s for entry into service in 2018. However, as the 390s no longer met crashworthiness standards for new trains, a derogation would have been required. With Alliance Rail not able to obtain this, in June 2017 it dropped its plans to purchase 390s.

=== Avanti West Coast refurbishment ===
In December 2019, all 56 trains transferred to Avanti West Coast, operators of the new West Coast Partnership. A major interior refurbishment of the fleet commenced in 2021, involving the replacement of all carpeting and standard-class seats, installation of power sockets at every seat, provision of more luggage space in second class, refitting of the onboard shop, installation of new lighting and the reupholstering of existing seats in first and standard premium classes. Additionally, one first-class coach in each of the 35 eleven-car 390/1 units was converted to standard class in order to provide additional capacity. The refurbishment programme cost £117 million and ran until 2024, with the work being performed by Alstom at Widnes, in Cheshire.

The first of the refurbished units returned to service on 25 April 2022. The refurbishment has resulted in a modest increase in capacity on the 11-car sets because of the conversion of coach G from first class to standard class. The result, once adjustments for the new standard class seats are taken into account, is an additional 64 standard class seats and a loss of 46 first class seats, for a new total capacity of 607 seats.

== Fleet details ==
Class	Operator	Qty.	Year built	Cars per unit	Unit nos.	Notes
390/0	Avanti West Coast	22	2001–2005	9	390001–390002, 390005–390006, 390008–390011, 390013, 390016, 390020, 390039–390040, 390042–390047, 390049–390050	390033 scrapped due to Grayrigg derailment, 2 vehicles at AWC training centre for training.
390/1	Avanti West Coast	31	2001–2005	11	390103–390104, 390107, 390112, 390114–390115, 390117–390119, 390121–390132, 390134–390138, 390141, 390148, 390151–390153	31 units lengthened to 11 cars each in 2012.
390/1	Avanti West Coast	4	2010–2012	11	390154–390157	New units purchased as part of extension order.

=== Liveries ===
All units were delivered in Virgin Trains livery of silver bodysides with black areas around the windows, red roofs and red cab-sides with the red areas on the cabs separated from the silver with a curved white band. Doors were originally painted with grey and white stripes. These were re-vinyled in plain grey in 2015.

From September 2017 onwards, the fleet was repainted by Alstom in Widnes into a new livery known as Flowing Silk, featuring plain white bodysides, black roofs and a vinyl applied red swoosh around the driving cab intended to visually represent a moving piece of silk. The livery was designed to use neutral colours at the behest of the Department for Transport to allow for an easier rebranding. The first unit to wear this livery was 390010. All of the nine-car units were repainted with last to be treated in August 2018, with repaints then commencing on the 11-car units. The final unit to receive the full Flowing Silk livery did so in August 2019. Subsequent repaints omitted all Virgin branding in preparation for the end of the franchise in December 2019.

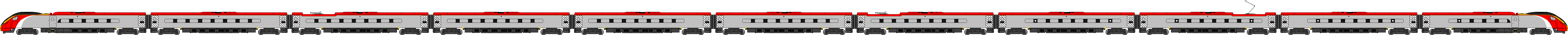
Illustration of a Virgin Trains Class 390/1 unit in its original livery
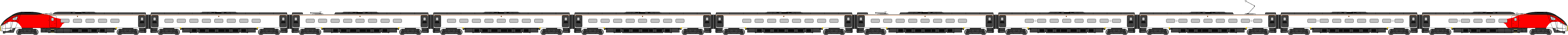
Illustration of a Virgin Trains Class 390/1 unit in Flowing Silk livery
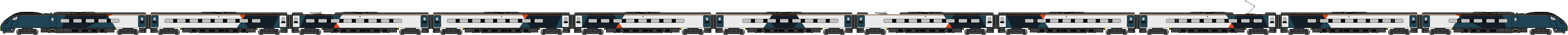
Illustration of an Avanti West Coast Class 390/1 unit

=== Names ===
All 53 of the original units were given cast nameplates in a standard style bearing the word Pendolino on the top of each name although several units were subsequently renamed with similar replacement cast nameplates being fitted. New cast names were applied to the additional four units after they had initially entered service without names.

Cast nameplates were removed from each unit when they were repainted into Flowing Silk in 2017–2018 and most of the Virgin-prefixed names have not been reapplied. However, those named after places, people and events have generally had the name reapplied in the form of a vinyl sticker.

==== List ====
Key:	In service	Scrapped

Number	Name	Notes
390001	Bee Together	Named on 20 July 2018 to mark launch of exhibition of over 100 sculptures of Manchester's worker bee emblem.
390002	Stephen Sutton	Named after teenage cancer patient who raised over £5 million before his death in 2014.
390003; (390103)	Asquith Xavier	Formerly Virgin Hero. Between 2014 and 2019 carried Royal British Legion World War I commemorative branding.
390004; (390104)	Alstom Pendolino	In September 2010 it was given a co-branded livery in partnership with Alstom and Virgin Trains.
390005	City of Wolverhampton	
390006	Rethink Mental Illness	Formerly Virgin Sun. Before that, Mission: Impossible.
390008	Charles Rennie Mackintosh	Formerly Virgin King. Named at Glasgow Central on 19 March 2018 as part of the 150th anniversary celebrations of famed architect and artist
390009	Treaty of Union	Formerly Virgin Queen
390010	Cumbrian Spirit	Formerly Commonwealth Games 2002, then renamed Chris Green, then renamed A Decade of Progress at Wolverhampton in May 2007 after a book written by John Balmforth. Was the first nine-car Pendolino to have Virgin's updated Flowing Silk livery. Cast The Cumbrian Spirit nameplates removed and name now carried by a sticker in the same style.
390011	City of Lichfield	
390012; (390112)		Formerly Virgin Star. Wore temporarily applied Christmas-themed vinyls on each driving car during December 2014 and branded 'Traindeer'
390013	Blackpool Belle	Formerly Virgin Spirit. Wore temporarily applied Christmas-themed vinyls on each driving car during December 2015 and branded 'Penguilino'. Named ‘'Blackpool Belle'’ in 2018 to celebrate the launch of Pendolino services to Blackpool.
390014; (390114)	City of Manchester	
390015; (390115)	Crewe All Change	Formerly Virgin Crusader
390016; (390200)	Railway 200	Named to mark 200th anniversary of the modern railway.
390017; (390117)	Blue Peter	Formerly Virgin Prince. Current name unveiled in October 2018 to mark the 60th anniversary of the BBC children's TV programme of the same name. Derailed at Shap on 3 November 2025.
390018; (390118)		Formerly Virgin Princess
390019; (390119)	Progress	Formerly Virgin Warrior, then renamed Unknown Soldier. Name unveiled on 11 November 2018 to mark the 100th anniversary of the end of World War I. Carries vinyls on all 11 carriages for Avanti West Coast Pride
390020		Formerly Virgin Cavalier.
390021; (390121)	Opportunity	Formerly Virgin Dream Carries vinyls on all 11 carriages for Avanti West Coast climate livery for Cop26 in Glasgow to tackle climate change.
390022; (390122)	Penny the Pendolino	Formerly Virgin Hope
390025; (390125)		Formerly Virgin Stagecoach. First Pendolino to have Avanti's fully refurbished interior.
390027 (390127)		Formerly Virgin Buccaneer, and previously, Jessica Varnish.
390028; (390128)	City of Preston	
390029; (390129)	City of Stoke-on-Trent Centenary 1925-2025	Formerly City of Stoke-on-Trent Wore temporarily applied vinyls on all nine coaches advertising Superman Returns during 2006 and temporarily applied vinyls on all nine coaches advertising Monkey: Journey to the West during 2007. Cab-end nameplates Brett installed in 2022.
390030; (390130)	City of Edinburgh	
390031; (390131)	City of Liverpool	
390032; (390132)	City of Birmingham	
390033	City of Glasgow	Crashed at Grayrigg on 23 February 2007; formally written off on 30 November 2007. The two undamaged vehicles were taken to the Virgin Trains staff training centre in Crewe. One damaged, but substantially intact, vehicle was donated to Cranfield University's accident investigation laboratory, and a further two such vehicles were used at the Fire Service College in Moreton-in-Marsh until they were scrapped in 2022.
390034; (390134)	City of Carlisle	
390035; (390135)	City of Lancaster	Name missing on one side since repaint June 2019, name only carried on eastern side (when running in normal formation).
390036; (390136)	City of Coventry	
390038; (390138)	City of London	
390039	Lady Godiva	Formerly Virgin Quest. Renamed Lady Godiva on 4 April 2019. It also has the new Coventry flag on it.
390042		Name City of Bangor/Dinas Bangor was moved to Class 221 Super Voyager unit 221 116.
390043	Railway Children	Formerly Virgin Explorer. Named to mark the 30th anniversary of the children’s charity.
390044	Royal Scot	Formerly Virgin Lionheart. Renamed before attempting to beat the London to Glasgow speed record set by the APT. The train failed by 21 seconds but set a new London to Glasgow speed record for the Class 390.
390045	Birmingham Pride	Formerly Virgin Valiant, then 101 Squadron, then Virgin Pride. Carried rainbow branding on coaches A and K with #ridewithpride slogan.
390047		Formerly CLIC Sargent.
390048; (390148)	Flying Scouseman	Formerly Virgin Harrier. Renamed as part of the Liverpool Echo train naming competition in June 2017.
390049		Formerly Virgin Express
390050		Formerly Virgin Invader
390051 (390151)	Unknown Soldier	Formerly Virgin Ambassador. Carrying a new Royal British Legion commemorative poppy livery.
390155	Railway Benefit Fund	Formerly X-Men: Days of Future Past. Named at Euston station on 31 March 2014 to promote the film of the same name. Named Railway Benefit Fund in April 2021 as part of a fundraising drive by Avanti West Coast, promoting the charity of the same name.
390156	Pride and Prosperity	
390157	Chad Varah	
