= Ashley Banjo =

British street dancer, choreographer and actor (born 1988)

Ashley Banjo MBE
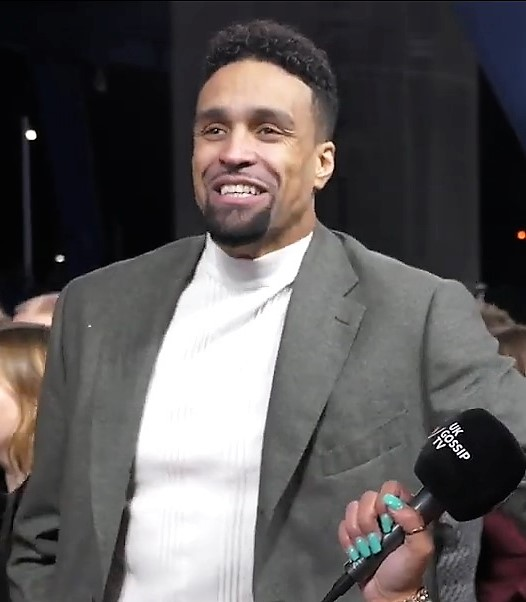
- Banjo interviewed by UK Gossip TV at the National Television Awards in 2020
- Born: Ashley Modurotolu Banjo; 4 October 1988 (age 38); Leytonstone, London, England
- Occupations: Dancer; choreographer; television personality
- Years active: 2007-present
- Children: 2
- Relatives: Jordan Banjo (brother)
- Dancing career
- Current group: Diversity
- Dances: Street dance

Ashley Modurotolu Banjo MBE (born 4 October 1988) is an English dancer, choreographer, and television personality. He is the leader of the street dance troupe Diversity who won the third series of the television talent show Britain's Got Talent in 2009. Banjo has been a judge on television dance competition shows, including Got to Dance (2009–2014), Dance Dance Dance (2017), Dancing on Ice (2018–2025), and Netflix original reality TV show Dance Monsters (2022). In 2016, he was a co-presenter for the Saturday night BBC game show Can't Touch This. Following their victory, Banjo created and choreographed several sell-out UK arena tours for the group, including the Limitless tour, the Born Ready 10th-anniversary tour, and the 2023–2024 Supernova tour.

== Early life and education ==
Banjo was born in Leytonstone, England, and grew up in Essex. His father is Nigerian heavyweight boxer Funso Banjo, and his mother is Danielle, a dance teacher from Ilford. Banjo was educated at the independent St John's School, Billericay, where he was Head Boy and still holds the high jump sports day record.

== Diversity ==
In 2007, Ashley and his younger brother Jordan formed Swift Moves with nine of their friends, before later changing their name to Diversity. He was given the nickname "Chosen" by his fellow Diversity members. In their first year together, they won the Street Dance Weekend 2007 competition, before deciding to enter Britain's Got Talent.

=== Britain's Got Talent ===
After receiving "yes" votes from all three judges in their audition, Diversity went on to compete in the first semi-final on 24 May, losing the public vote-decided first place to Susan Boyle but winning the judges' vote against Natalie Okri. In the final six days later, Diversity were announced as the winners, beating Boyle and Julian Smith (who came second and third respectively). As winners of the competition, Diversity received £100,000 (around £9,090 per member) and went on to perform before Queen Elizabeth at the Royal Variety Show on 7 December 2009.

=== Post Britain's Got Talent ===
Subsequently, Diversity were nominated in the Dance section of the final South Bank Show awards and won an award at the Pride of Britain Awards

In 2013 Ashley choreographed a tour for Diversity called Limitless. The tour ran from 30 November to 16 December.

In 2021, Ashley partnered with detergent brand Persil and TV channel Sky Nature to make a series of short films highlighting environmental action.

In June 2023, he began playing the Tin Woodman in the West End revival of The Wizard of Oz.

== Television work ==
Ashley was a judge on Sky1's dancing talent show Got to Dance for all five series. Diversity appeared as guest performers at least once every series. In total they did nine performances on the show. In 2015, he presented Perspectives: Michael Jackson's Thriller with Ashley Banjo.

In 2016, Banjo co-presented Can't Touch This, a Saturday night game show for BBC One, alongside Zoe Ball. In 2017, Banjo was a judge on the new ITV series Dance Dance Dance, presented by Alesha Dixon and Will Best.

From January 2018, Banjo was part of the judging panel on Dancing on Ice, starting with its tenth series that year.

In August 2020, it was announced that due to Simon Cowell's bike injury and recovery period, Banjo would replace Cowell for the live semi-final and final shows of the 14th series of Britain's Got Talent.

== Filmography ==
Year	Title	Role
1996	Barrymore	Himself
2009, 2016, 2020	Britain's Got Talent	Himself (2009, 2016), Guest Judge (2020)
2010	StreetDance 3D	Aaron
2010–2014	Got to Dance	Himself as a judge
2011	The Real Hustle	Himself
2011	The Magicians	Himself
2011	The Apprentice	Himself
2011	Text Santa	Himself
2012–2014	Ashley Banjo's Secret Street Crew	Himself
2012	Celebrity Juice	Himself
2012	The Cube	Himself, won £20,000 to split between NSPCC and Beatbullying
2013	Stella	Himself, episode 2.7
2013	Celebrity Juice	Himself
2013	Jordan and Perri's Ultimate Block Party	Himself
2014	Ashley Banjo's Big Town Dance	Himself
2014	Stars at Your Service	Himself
2014	This Morning	Himself
2014	Release the Hounds: Jingle Hell	Himself, team won £12,000 to split between NSPCC and Beatbullying
2015	Diversity Live	Himself
2015	You're Back in the Room	Guest
2015	Perspectives Michael Jackson's Thriller with Ashley Banjo	Himself, presenter
2016	Can't Touch This	Himself, co-presenter
2017	Diversity Presents Steal the Show	Himself
2017	Dance Dance Dance	Himself as a judge
2017	All Round to Mrs. Brown's	Himself, guest
2017	Catchphrase: Celebrity Special	Himself, contestant
2017	A Night for the Emergency Services	Himself, presenter
2017—	The Real Full Monty	Himself, co-presenter
2017, 2021—	Pride of Britain Awards	Himself; roving reporter (2017), Co-host (2021—)
2018-2025	Dancing on Ice	Himself as a judge
2019—	Flirty Dancing	Himself, presenter
2020	On Christmas Night	Himself, reader
2021	The Void	Himself, presenter
2021	Ashley Banjo: Britain in Black and White	Himself, presenter
2022	Dance Monsters	Himself, judge
2026	Pilgrimage	Himself

== Personal life ==
After winning Britain's Got Talent in 2009, Banjo took a break from his schooling to concentrate on his dancing. He said that "from the age of 14, I started to teach myself routines". Banjo was in a thirteen-year relationship with Francesca Abbott, who is a member of another dance troupe called Out of the Shadows. They announced their engagement on 2 October 2014. In 2015, they got married. Ashley and Francesa have two children, Rose (born 2019) and Micah (born 2020). Ashley and Francesca announced on 23 December 2022 that they had separated 18 months earlier.

Ashley Banjo is an Official Ambassador of the United Dance Organisation.

Banjo was appointed Member of the Order of the British Empire (MBE) in the 2022 New Year Honours for services to dance.
