= Diversity (dance troupe) =

British street dance troupe

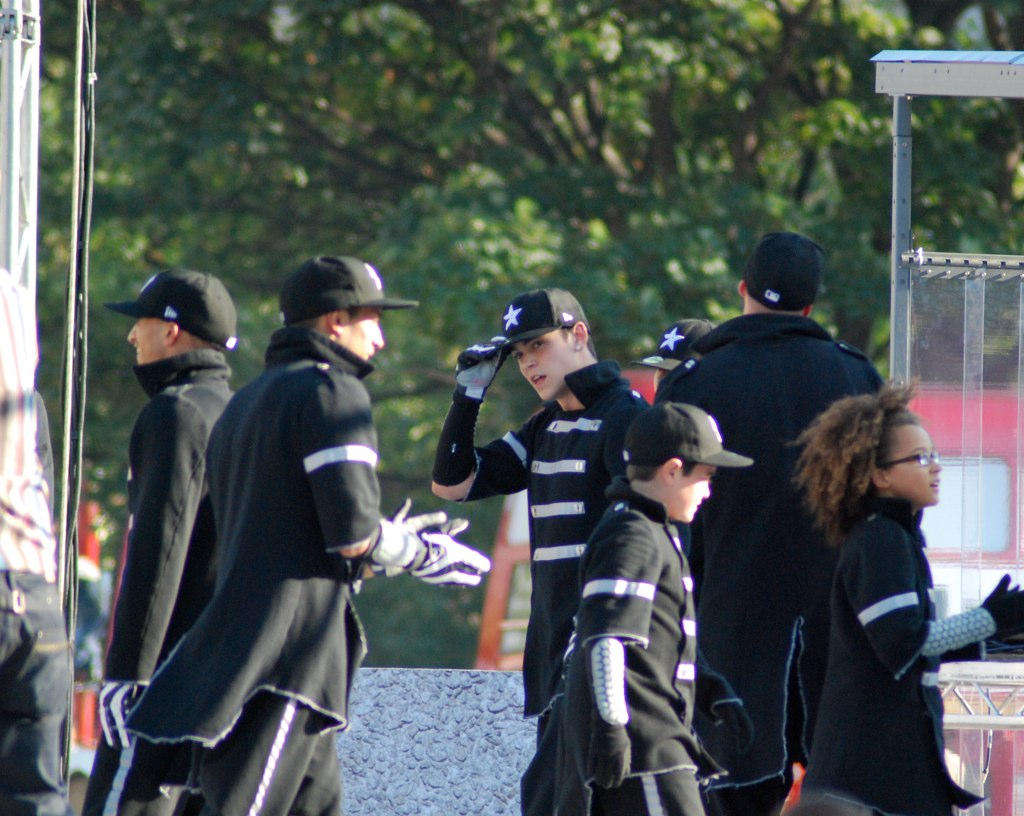
- Diversity in 2009

Background information
- Origin: London, United Kingdom
- Genres: Street dance (popping, roboting, lyrical hip hop, contemporary hip hop dance, breakdance, acrobatics)
- Years active: 2007–present
- Members: Ashley Banjo; Jordan Banjo; Perri Kiely; Mitchell Craske; Sam Craske; Warren Russell; Nathan Ramsey; Adam Mckop; Kelvin Clark; Jordan Samuel; Shante Samuel; Theo Mckenzie-Hayton; Starr Kiely; Georgia Lewis; Curtis Butler; Abbie Pheasey; Jackson-Osegbo King
- Past members: Robert Anker; Ike Chuks; Ian McNaughton; Jamie McNaughton; Matthew McNaughton; Ashton Russell; Terry Smith; Morgan Plom; Jack Simmons; Floyd van Dongen; James Botterill
- Website: diversitystudio.co.uk

Diversity is an English street dance troupe formed in 2007 and based in London. They are best known for winning the third series of Britain's Got Talent in 2009, beating Susan Boyle in the live final.

Diversity consists of friends from London (Leytonstone and Dagenham) and Essex (Basildon), including four sets of siblings and nine other members. At the time they appeared on Britain's Got Talent, some were still at school or university, while others had jobs of their own. As of February 2015, the then-members of the group, ranging in age from 11–30 (the lineup on Britain's Got Talent ranged from 12–25), consisted of: leader and choreographer Ashley Banjo, Jordan Banjo, Sam Craske, Mitchell Craske, Perri Kiely, Warren Russell, Terry Smith, Nathan Ramsay, Theo Mckenzie-Hayton, Adam Mckop, Kelvin Clark, Jordan Samuel, Shante Samuel, Starr Kiely, Georgia Lewis and Curtis Butler. Founding members Ashton Russell, Ian McNaughton, Jamie McNaughton, Matthew McNaughton and Ike Chuks have left Diversity. As of December 2013 they are based at Dancework Studio. On 28 July 2017, it was announced that former member Robert Anker had died following a traffic collision in Canada.

== History ==
=== Before Diversity: Swift Moves ===
Before Diversity most of the group belonged to Swift Moves or Swift Moves Juniors.

As Swift Moves, they beat KI (the crew Marlon Wallen from Flawless was with) in 2005 during KI's second run to seven wins at The Jump Off where Swift Moves battled a total of four times.

=== 2007: Formation and early career ===
Formed in 2007, although there were a few line-up changes between 2007 and 2009 with Perri Kiely and Ike Chuks joining the group while Robert Anker and Ashton Russell did not take part in Britain's Got Talent. They won the Street Dance Weekend 2007 competition. By the time they performed in the Street Dance Weekend as guests in 2008 the group consisted of friends from east London (Leytonstone and Dagenham) and Essex (Basildon), included four sets of brothers and three other members. Some were still at school or university, while others had jobs of their own. The group consisted of leader and choreographer Ashley Banjo and the following other members: Robert Anker, Jordan Banjo, Sam Craske, Mitchell Craske, Warren Russell, Ashton Russell, Perri Kiely, Ike Chuks, Terry Smith, Ian McNaughton, Jamie McNaughton and Matthew McNaughton. Ashton Russell played the part of Young Michael Jackson in the musical Thriller – Live.

=== 2009: Britain's Got Talent ===
In 2009, Diversity auditioned in London for the third series of Britain's Got Talent. Judge Amanda Holden said: "Just when I think I've seen it all, you came on." They received three "yes" votes from Holden, Piers Morgan and Simon Cowell, and eventually progressed to the live semi-finals, where they opened the first show on 24 May. After their performance, they received a standing ovation from the audience and the judges, who all dubbed their performance "fantastic". Later that night, they were in the top three with singers Natalie Okri and Susan Boyle. Boyle was revealed to have received the most votes and went straight through to the live final, meaning that the judges would choose between Okri and Diversity for the second spot in the final. Morgan and Cowell both voted in favour of Diversity – Morgan believed that Diversity had a better chance of winning the show and Cowell admitted that he had been "a huge fan" of Diversity from their first audition.

Following their performance in the final, Holden said she thought Diversity had "blown Flawless out of the water", while Cowell said that "If I had to give marks on that, this would be the only performance tonight I would give a 10 to." However, Morgan thought Flawless "just edged [Diversity]." They finished in the top three again, as did Boyle, along with saxophonist Julian Smith. In a shock result, in front of a record audience of 17.3 million viewers, Diversity were announced as the winners, despite Boyle being the clear favourite to win.

=== 2009: BGT tour and 1st Royal Variety show performance ===
After winning Britain's Got Talent, Diversity appeared on the US television news programmes The Today Show and Larry King Live to talk about their future plans. They also took part in the Britain's Got Talent – The Live Tour 2009 in June and July.

Diversity also became Patrons of Dance Aid organised by the UK Registered Charity, Hope for Children. They performed at the Wireless Festival in Hyde Park, London on 5 July, and appeared at T4 on the Beach on 19 July at Weston-super-Mare.

On 31 August, Diversity performed at Blackpool's Winter Gardens in a Michael Jackson tribute alongside George Sampson and Aidan Davis. This performance was on the same weekend as the World Street Dancing championships. They performed in London to launch the new Disney channel Disney XD. They also performed outside 10 Downing Street in front of Prime Minister Gordon Brown, during which Perri slipped and fell on his head after attempting a back-flip. He did not sustain any serious injury.

Diversity also appeared in the Gracious K music video "Migraine Skank" along with dance group Flawless. In January 2010, Ashley Banjo appeared as a judge on the Sky1 reality show Got to Dance, alongside Adam Garcia and Kimberly Wyatt. Diversity switched on Christmas lights at Chapelfield shopping centre in Norwich on 5 November, then in Meadowhall Shopping Centre in Sheffield on 6 November then in Watford on 12 November.

On 11 November, Diversity conducted several hours of signing autographs and posing for photographs with thousands of fans at The Galleria Shopping Centre in Hatfield, Hertfordshire. Afterwards, they hosted a prize-giving ceremony on stage and performed their "Michael Jackson" dance routine. They performed another Michael Jackson tribute at the MOBO Awards ceremony. Diversity "launched" Christmas at Lakeside on 1 November, where they took two members of the audience on-stage for a dance-off. There was a competition held in November, and a hundred people won a meet and greet with Diversity on 19 November at The Glades in Bromley. On 7 December, Diversity performed on the Royal Variety Performance, hosted in Blackpool and shown on ITV across the UK on 16 December. On the show Got to Dance Warm Up, they presented their Westfield Shopping Centre FlashMob, sponsored by T-Mobile.

=== 2010: Diversity's tour ===
Diversity promoted street dancing with Change4Life in January as a means of getting kids and families more active.

The first dates for Diversity's spring tour sold out in 24 hours, which led to further dates being announced, the first being at the Manchester Apollo on 27 March. The tour centres on toys "coming to life". Diversity being the main toy as "Diversitoys", fellow Britain's Got Talent dance group Suga-Free as "the dolls", Aidan Davis as "Bionic Boy", and others. Due to phenomenal public demand, Diversity brought back their "Diversitoys" tour in December with a Special Christmas twist "Diversitoys Christmas Special". Part of the tour were later shown on TV in the program Diversity Live: The Diversitoys Tour.

The group teamed up with national retailer The Range Home and Leisure for a commercial to be shown in April and May, with the tagline "If you like Diversity, you'll love The Range". They also appeared in adverts for food for "great little ideas". Diversity appeared in the UK film StreetDance 3D, released on 21 May 2010, in which they starred alongside Britain's Got Talent 2009 finalists Flawless and 2008 winner George Sampson.

They brought out their own fitness DVD called Diversity Dance Fitness Fusion in November 2010.

=== 2011–2012: Digitized tour ===
Ashton Russell re-joined Diversity.

In July and August Diversity members Mitchell Craske, Perri Kiely and Ashton Russell along with fellow Dancework studio dancer Nathan Ramsey took part in the Born to Shine roadshow. At each show two of the four would perform and take part in a dance masterclass for children.

The group did a number of TV performances including Britain's Got Talent, Got to Dance, Red or Black? and Born to Shine. They also filmed the first series of Ashley Banjo's Secret Street Crew. In September they supported the Railway Children charity by producing a film for them and also a competition where the winners would meet the group on their next tour.

In October the group performed at the Michael Forever – The Tribute Concert.

The first series of Ashley Banjo's Secret Street Crew aired. In the show members of Diversity took turns to help Ash teach small groups a street dance. The group also filmed the second series of "Ashley Banjo's Secret Street Crew" during the course of the year.

Starting from March, Diversity did their first UK Arena tour, Digitized – Trapped in the Game. They sold out the O2 Arena with a standing ovation from the audience. Shortly after the Digitized tour Ian McNaughton, Jamie McNaughton and Matthew McNaughton left the group. Later in the year they brought out their DVD of the tour filmed at the O2 Arena.

=== 2012–2014: Limitless tour ===
Diversity were among the many torch bearers in London's 2012 Olympic Torch Relay, completing their leg of the journey on 22 July 2012.

They performed on the Royal Variety Performance 2012 with Spelbound, Stavros Flatley and Paul Potts.

Got to Dance returned for its fourth series. As per previous series Diversity did a number of performance. The fourth series also saw Diversity members Jordan and Perri start hosting in their own right as they took on the role of the backstage presenters. This was followed a few months later by their own show.

In spring of 2013 Diversity spent 2 months in Stockton-on-Tees teaching large groups of people to dance for the Sky1 show "Ashley Banjo's Big Town Dance". The second series of "Ashley Banjo's Secret Street Crew" aired at the start of the year. The group have also been working on a third series of Ashley Banjo's Secret Street Crew since April.

In Summer 2013 Diversity members Jordan Banjo and Perri Kiely, hosted their own TV show Jordan and Perri's Ultimate Block Party where they transformed groups of young people (Swim Team, Youth Club etc.) into a dance troupe in only 2 days.

In the run up to the limitless tour the group did a number of performances including one at the Danone Nations Cup (a football competition dedicated to children) at Wembley Stadium and another on top of the O2 Arena in London for Nickelodeon's Fruit Shoot Skills Awards.

Diversity did their third tour called Limitless from 30 November to 16 December. They performed one of the performances from the tour on Got to Dance at the start of the year.

In February 2014, Perri won the second series of Splash!

A new Diversity show called Ashley Banjo's Big Town Dance (which has also been called The Town That Danced Again while in production) aired on Sky 1 in January and February. Big Town dance followed Ashley and Diversity as they spent 2 months in Stockton-on-Tees trying to bring the town together through dance.

It was announced on 17 February that Diversity Members Jordan Banjo and Perri Kiely would be the UK hosts for Nickelodeon Kids' Choice Awards. Following the announcement Jordan and Perri spent a week in LA filming a number of adverts and video blogs which Nickelodeon showed on their UK channel and web site in the run up to the Awards.

On 1 March, Diversity performed on Ant & Dec's Saturday Night Takeaway and announced that due to public demand a reboot of their Limitless tour would return in November 2014.

Diversity performed with Little Mix during the final of Britain's Got Talent on 7 June. They had previously performed on Britain's Got More Talent on their own on 29 May.

Members of Diversity have also done a number of adverts. Perri & Mitchell did ITV – Where The Entertainers Live in March. Ash, Jordan and Perri did a series of videos for Cadbury Marvellous Mix-Ups in May. Jordan and Perri did a number of videos and judging for British Gas Generation Green Energy Performance in May and June. The pair also did a number of adverts for Transformers toys in June. In October Ike took part in itvplayer's Ready when you are.

Diversity appeared at Weston Super-Mare Beach Festival on 28 June. They took part in Barclaycard presents British Summer Time Hyde Park with McBusted on 6 July. They also appeared at the Leicester Music Festival on Friday 25 and Saturday 26 July.

Diversity took part in the closing ceremony of the first Invictus Games on 14 September. Their set included the Corps of Drums from Her Majestys Band of The Royal Marines and three members of Diversity Juniors. The three Diversity Juniors also took part in Diversity performance on Got to Dance on 25 August.

=== 2015: The Exclusive Tour – Up Close and Personal ===
Diversity Live broadcast on 4 January during which the group talked about how various dances that have inspired them and the major influences who have helped them along the way.

On 13 March 2015, Warren Russell was a judge at the first ever Balfour Beatty London Youth Games dance competition.

In early 2015 it was announced that Diversity members Jordan and Perri would be reprising their roles as UK hosts for the Nickelodeon Kids' Choice Awards 2015. They again spent time in the USA filming short clips for Nickelodeon in the run up to the awards. Before returning to the UK where Diversity filmed a special routine for the pre-show. During the filming of this Diversity members Ashley, Mitchell, Sam, Ike, Warren and Terry were all slimed, a form of honour from Nickelodeon. Jordan and Perri also got slimed when they hosted and performed with Diversity at the UK's first ever Nickelodeon Slimefest 2016.

On 9 May 2015 they gave the opening performance at VE Day 70: A Party to Remember in Horse Guards Parade, London.

=== 2015–present: Butlins Tour – Butlins Up Close and Personal ===
During 2015 members of Diversity performed shows and took dance class at a number of Butlins resorts during the school holidays. So far they been joined on stage by fellow Dancework studio dancer Nathan Ramsey and members of Diversity Juniors along with drummer Kieran Gaffney.

Although it was not officially announced, Ike Chuks left the group in early 2016 to pursue his music career.

In 2016, Ashley Banjo (alongside Zoe Ball) hosted the BBC show Can't Touch This.

On 3 February 2016, Diversity, along with some young people and staff from Dancework Studios performed for Tonight at the London Palladium, hosted by Bradley Walsh.

Diversity also returned to ITV, where they starred in two episodes of the Ant & Dec's Saturday Night Takeaway segment "Who Shot Simon Cowell?" as well as a special performance (created by Ashley Banjo) to celebrate 10 years of Britain's Got Talent. They returned once again in the New Year to promote their new ITV special Diversity Presents Steal The Show. Ashley Banjo was also a judge on the Strictly Come Dancing rival Dance Dance Dance.

On 8 November 2016, Jordan Banjo was announced as being part of the line-up for series 16 of I'm a Celebrity...Get Me Out of Here!

Diversity returned to Butlins for 2016. It was announced in August 2016 that Diversity will be back at Butlins for October 2016

It was announced that Diversity was returning to Butlins for their fourth year in 2018 along with the dance academy.

=== 2017: Genesis Tour and pantomime debut ===
Diversity showcased their 7th UK arena tour, Genesis. The tour is the final element to the Diversity Superhero saga.

From 9 December 2017 to 14 January 2018, Diversity made their pantomime debut in Dick Whittington at the London Palladium, alongside Julian Clary, Elaine Paige, Paul Zerdin, Gary Wilmot, Nigel Havers and Charlie Stemp.

On 28 July 2017, member Robert Anker died in a car accident in Canada.

On 6 November 2017, Ashley Banjo was confirmed to be one of the four judges on the revived ITV show Dancing on Ice. Diversity performed for a one-off Christmas special – named A Night of Emergency Services. Ashley Banjo returned for his second series of Dancing on Ice, in 2019.

=== 2019–present: One-off performances ===
On 2 June 2019, to commemorate their 10th anniversary from first appearing, Diversity appeared as an interval act on the Britain's Got Talent final. The routine also included fire stunts and gymnastics.

On 16 November 2025, the troupe joined the Strictly Come Dancing Professionals in a collective dance number during that week's musical interval. They danced to a fusion of Raye's Where Is My Husband!, Taylor Swift's Look What You Made Me Do and The Pussycat Doll's Don't Cha

== Tours ==
- Britain's Got Talent Tour (2009)
- Diversitoys (2010)
  - Diversitoys Christmas Special (2010)
- Digitized – Trapped in the Game (2012)
- Limitless (2013)
- Salute Tour With Little Mix
  - Limitless The Reboot (2014)
- The Exclusive Tour – Up Close and Personal (2015)
- Butlins – Up Close and Personal (2015)
- Genesis (2017)
- Dick Whittington at the London Palladium (2017–2018)
- Aladdin at the Cliffs Pavilion Southend (2018–2019)
- Robin Hood and His Merry Men at the Cliffs Pavilion Southend (2019–2020)
- Ignite (2018)
- Born Ready (2019)
- Connected (2022)
- Snow White and the Seven Dwarfs
  - at the Cliffs Pavilion Southend (2022)
  - at the Mayflower Theatre Southampton (2023)
- Supernova (2023–2024)
- Soul (2026)
- Butlins – Time Capsule (2026)

== DVDs ==
- Diversity: Dance.Fitness.Fusion (2010)
- Diversity Digitized: The Live Tour 2012 (2012)

Preceded by George Sampson	Winner of Britain's Got Talent; 2009	Succeeded by Spelbound
