= Chord (aeronautics) =

Imaginary straight line joining the leading and trailing edges of an aerofoil

Aerofoil nomenclature showing chord line

Chord line of a turbine aerofoil section

In aeronautics, the chord is an imaginary straight line segment joining the leading edge and trailing edge of an aerofoil cross section parallel to the direction of the airflow. The chord length is the distance between the trailing edge and the leading edge. The point on the leading edge used to define the main chord may be the surface point of minimum radius. For a turbine aerofoil, the chord may be defined by the line between points where the front and rear of a 2-dimensional blade section would touch a flat surface when laid convex-side up.

The wing, horizontal stabilizer, vertical stabilizer and propeller/rotor blades of an aircraft are all based on aerofoil sections, and the term chord or chord length is also used to describe their width. The chord of a wing, stabilizer and propeller is determined by measuring the distance between leading and trailing edges in the direction of the airflow. (If a wing has a rectangular planform, rather than tapered or swept, then the chord is simply the width of the wing measured in the direction of airflow.) The term chord is also applied to the width of wing flaps, ailerons and rudder on an aircraft.

Many wings are not rectangular, so they have different chords at different positions. Usually, the chord length is greatest where the wing joins the aircraft's fuselage (called the root chord) and decreases along the wing toward the wing's tip (the tip chord). Most jet aircraft use a tapered swept wing design. To provide a characteristic figure that can be compared among various wing shapes, the mean aerodynamic chord (abbreviated MAC) is used, although it is complex to calculate. The mean aerodynamic chord is used for calculating pitching moments.

A chord may also be defined for compressor and turbine aerofoils in gas turbine engines such as turbojet, turboprop, or turbofan engines for aircraft propulsion.

== Standard mean chord ==
Standard mean chord (SMC) is defined as wing area divided by wing span:

$$\mbox{SMC} = \frac{S}{b},$$

where S is the wing area and b is the span of the wing. Thus, the SMC is the chord of a rectangular wing with the same area and span as those of the given wing. This is a purely geometric figure and is rarely used in aerodynamics.

== Mean aerodynamic chord ==
Chords on a swept-wing. Note that the MAC occurring at a point where the trailing edge sweep changes in this image is just a coincidence for this particular wing. In general, this is not the case and any shape other than a simple trapezoid requires evaluation of the integral discussed in this section.

Mean aerodynamic chord (MAC) is defined as:

$\mbox{MAC} = \frac{2}{S}$$\int_{0}^{\frac{b}{2}}c(y)^2 dy,$

where y is the coordinate along the wing span and c is the chord at the coordinate y. Other terms are as for SMC.

The MAC is a two-dimensional representation of the whole wing. The pressure distribution over the entire wing can be reduced to a single lift force on and a moment around the aerodynamic center of the MAC. Therefore, not only the length but also the position of MAC is often important. In particular, the position of center of gravity (CG) of an aircraft is usually measured relative to the MAC, as the percentage of the distance from the leading edge of MAC to CG with respect to MAC itself.

The ratio of the length (or span) of a rectangular-planform wing to its chord is known as the aspect ratio, an important indicator of the lift-induced drag the wing will create. (For wings with planforms that are not rectangular, the aspect ratio is calculated as the square of the span divided by the wing planform area.) Wings with higher aspect ratios will have less induced drag than wings with lower aspect ratios. Induced drag is most significant at low airspeeds. This is why gliders have long slender wings.

== Tapered wing ==
Knowing the area (S_{w}), taper ratio ($\lambda$) and the span (b) of the wing, the chord at any position on the span can be calculated by the formula:

$$c(y)=\frac{2\,S_w}{(1+\lambda)b}\left[1-\frac{1-\lambda}{b}|2 y|\right].$$

where

$\lambda=\frac{C_{\rm Tip}}{C_{\rm Root}}$
