= Merlin Cadogan =

English escapologist, juggler, breath holder (born 1974)

- Born: 1974 (age 51–52); Northam, Devon, England
- Occupation: Performer

Merlin Cadogan (born in 1974) is an escapologist who reached the semi-finals of Britain's Got Talent in 2009. He set a Guinness World Record for the longest time to juggle three objects underwater in a single breath, with a time of one minute and 20 seconds. He also broke the Guinness World Record for picking the most police handcuffs in one minute (six sets) live on ITV's Magic Numbers in 2010.

Merlin currently works at the Milky Way Adventure Park near Bideford as an entertainer. He also lives in Rose Wests old house in Northam.
