= The Role Play Haven =

Tabletop Role Playing Club

The Role Play Haven CIC
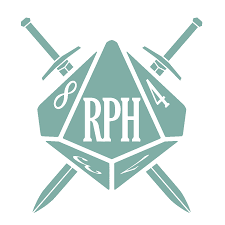
- Company type: Community interest company
- Industry: Tabletop role-playing game
- Founded: 2015; 11 years ago in London
- Founders: Garry Harper, James Desmond, Craig Elias, Elvis Langley
- Headquarters: London, UK
- Owners: Garry Harper; David Coulter
- Website: www.rphaven.co.uk

The Role Play Haven is a tabletop role-playing club across the United Kingdom that injects its profits into local communities and charities. The club was founded in 2010 and later formed as a Community interest company in 2015. Their mission is Fun, Safe Gaming.

In 2012 The Role Play Haven was invited to take part in Ashley Banjo's Secret Street Crew which is a documentary reality show that was broadcasting on Sky1.

In 2013 The Role Play Haven came under threat by government hospital closure where their venue was based. The Role Play Haven teamed up with local communities and hospitals to campaign to block the government's plan. They won.

During COVID-19 pandemic in 2020, The Role Play Haven closed all branches and reported financial trouble and possible permanent branch closures. A Crowdfunding was launched to raise money to help maintain the organisation during the lockdown and reopen.

== Branches of The Role Play Haven ==
- 2010 – Lewisham Branch based in London was founded.
- 2015 – Stratford Branch based in London was founded.
- 2018 – Archway Branch based in London was founded.
- 2018 – Cardiff Centre based in Cardiff, Wales was founded.
- 2019 – Cardiff North based in Cardiff, Wales was founded.
- 2019 – Hammersmith Branch based in London was founded.
- 2022 – Edinburgh Branch based in Scotland was founded.
- 2024 – Liverpool Branch based in England was founded.
