= DJ Talent =

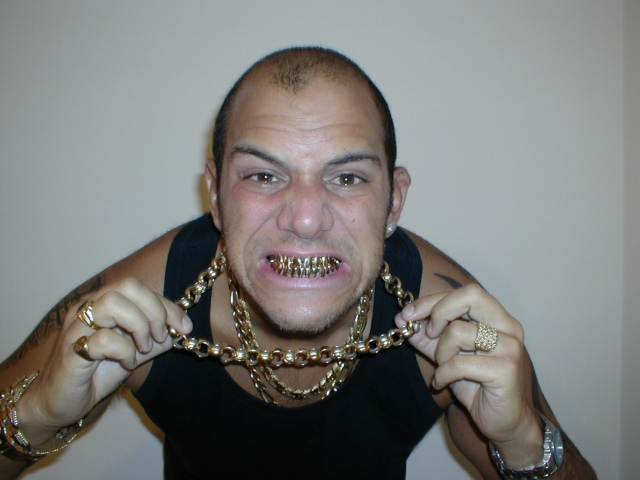
- DJ Talent London 2006

Background information
- Born: Anthony Ghosh; 11 August 1978 (age 48)
- Origin: London, United Kingdom
- Genre: Hip hop EDM
- Occupations: DJ, rapper Singer . Songwriter. Actor
- Instrument: Vocals
- Years active: 2002–present
- Label: Talent Recordings music/ (Cyber Headz Crew/ MR T)
- Website: www.djtalentrecordings.com

DJ Talent (real name Anthony Ghosh) (born 11 August 1978 in London) is a British part-time DJ from Peterborough, England, most widely known for his appearance as a semi-finalist on the third series of the ITV television show Britain's Got Talent. He is noted for the excessive amount of bling that he wears, which includes several gold chains and rings (one infused with a blue stone), and a full set of gold teeth costing £7000 in total.

Prior to his appearance on Britain's Got Talent, he has appeared on TV programmes including Homemade on T4 where he appeared with celebrity blogger and TV presenter Mark Boardman, The Jeremy Kyle Show, Vanessa's Real Lives, Ann Widdecombe Versus The Diet Industry, Charlie Brooker's Screenwipe and The Friday Night Project where he performed a rap for guest host Kanye West, as well as appearing on "Best Guest Week" on the Scott Mills Show for Radio 1. He also appeared in the marketing campaign for UK Bingo website, BOGOF Bingo, circa 2009.

== Personal life ==
Anthony Ghosh / DJ Talent lives in his birth city, London, with his Indian father Sujit, and his English mother Patricia. He is based and lives in Eastbourne, England.

In 2005, he appeared on The Jeremy Kyle Show with his mother, who was questioning his respect for women and his lifestyle as a DJ. He was ridiculed as he bragged about his apparent fame and was mocked by numerous members of the studio audience.

In late 2008, as a direct result of the 2008 financial crisis and its associated economic downturn, Talent attempted to raise cash by selling off his 28 gold teeth for £14,000, although ultimately this was never seen through. DJ Talent also goes under alias production names Cyber Headz Crew/ MR T.

== Britain's Got Talent ==
His act as part of Britain's Got Talent for the auditions stage solely consisted of a one verse rap. The lyrics are as follows:

I say you say Britain
We say Talent
Britain's got talent!
This is DJ Talent!

Despite apparent criticism, and receiving four buzzes from the judging panel, albeit one operated incorrectly after Kelly Brook pressed Piers Morgan's buzzer (although she claimed that it was not DJ Talent, but Piers's dancing), Talent made it past the opening stage to the semi-finals. After performing and being put through, Talent proceeded to invite judge Kelly Brook out to dinner, which was accepted on her behalf by Simon Cowell. He was previously set on dating Kelly Brook.

The popularised Talent theme was used in the Britain's Got Talent show in subsequent episodes between acts as one of several jingles.
