= Ashley Banjo's Secret Street Crew =

- Genre: Documentary
- Presented by: Ashley Banjo
- Country of origin: United Kingdom
- Original language: English
- No. of series: 3
- No. of episodes: 21

Production
- Running time: 60mins (inc. adverts)
- Production companies: Princess Productions (Series 1); Shine TV (Series 2 & 3)

Original release
- Network: Sky1
- Release: 29 January 2012 – 19 October 2014

Ashley Banjo's Secret Street Crew is a documentary reality show that has been broadcasting on Sky1 since 29 January 2012.

Each episode follows a group of non-dancers as they learn a street dance routine in secret from Ashley with the help of two or more members of Diversity who act as mentors.

Each episode begins with Ashley meeting the group he will be choreographing for and teaching. After everyone has introduced themselves, Ashley invites a number of the members of Diversity to join him and gives the group a demonstration of what level of dance they are expected to reach by the end of their training. These routines are segments from Diversity's former routines. Ashley will then leave the group with tasks regarding fitness while he and Diversity choreograph the final routine for the group. At the end of each episode, the group surprise their family and friends with the polished performance at an event.

== Episodes ==
=== Series 1 (2012) ===
Episode	Group	Location	Gender	Members	Diversity Mentors	Original Air Date	Viewers
1	Darts players (Dartversity)	Stockport	Male	5	Ian McNaughton & Warren Russell	29 January 2012	750,000
2	Fantasy role-players	London	Male	6	Ike Ezekwugo & Perri Kiely	5 February 2012	799,000
3	Dinner ladies	Kent	Female	5	Jordan Banjo & Perri Kiely	12 February 2012	722,000
4	Polo players	Hull	Co-ed	6 ⬇ 5	Jordan Banjo & Mitchell Craske	19 February 2012	805,000
5	Beauticians	Essex	Female	6	Ian McNaughton & Terry Smith	26 February 2012	643,000
6	Police officers	Sheffield	Female	5 ⬇ 3	Matthew McNaughton & Warren Russell	11 March 2012	678,000

=== Series 2 (2013) ===
Episode	Group	Location	Gender	Members	Diversity Mentors	Original Air Date	Viewers
1	The Wedding Party	Swindon	Male	5	Sam Craske & Warren Russell	17 March 2013	693,000
2	The Rugby Girls	Worthing	Female	5	Jordan Banjo & Perri Kiely	24 March 2013	653,000
3	The Youth Orchestra	Warwickshire	Co-ed	5	Perri Kiely & Terry Smith	31 March 2013	Under 599,000
4	The Farmers	South Yorkshire	Male	6	Jordan Banjo & Sam Craske	7 April 2013	Under 436,000
5	The Bible Group	North London	Female	7	Jordan Banjo, Ike Ezekwugo & Perri Kiely	14 April 2013	Under 470,000
6	The Estate Agents	Southampton	Male	5	Mitchell Craske & Terry Smith	21 April 2013	Under 435,000
7	The Boobs and Brass	Northamptonshire	Female	6	Ike Ezekwugo & Perri Kiely	28 April 2013	Under 407,000
8	The Firefighters	Essex	Male	5	Jordan Banjo & Warren Russell	5 May 2013	Under 561,000
9	The Teachers	Edinburgh	Co-ed	6	Mitchell Craske & Warren Russell	12 May 2013	Under 478,000

=== Series 3 (2014) ===
On 14 March 2013, it was announced that Ashley Banjo’s Secret Street Crew has been renewed for a third series. The series started airing on Sky 1 on 14 September 2014.

Episode	Group	Location	Gender	Members	Diversity Mentors	Original Air Date	Viewers
1	Nurses (Di-Nursity)	Coventry	Female	5	Ike Ezekwugo & Terry Smith	14 September 2014	Under 314,000
2	Traffic Wardens	Worthing	Co-ed	6	Mitchell Craske & Sam Craske	21 September 2014	
3	21st Birthday	Bedfordshire	Co-ed	5 ⬆ 6 (⬆ 14)	Sam Craske & Ike Ezekwugo	28 September 2014	Under 330,000
4	Women's Institute (WIversity)	London	Female	6	Jordan Banjo & Perri Kiely	5 October 2014	Under 315,000
5	Bin Men	Manchester	Male	5	Warren Russell & Terry Smith	12 October 2014	Under 307,000
6	Wheelchair Basketball Team	Portsmouth	Male	5	Mitchell Craske & Warren Russell	19 October 2014	Under 359,000
