= Natalie Okri =

British singer-songwriter

- Born: 20 November 1998 (age 27); London, England
- Occupations: Singer, songwriter, producer
- Years active: 2009 - present
- Known for: Britains Got Talent semi-finalist in 2009 aged ten, with fifth most streamed audition to date

Natalie Okri (born 20 November 1998) is a British singer and songwriter. She rose to prominence in 2009 after her performance on Britain’s Got Talent.

Born Natalie Tafadzwanashe Okri in November 1998 in London, England, she grew up in Deptford, London where she had her early education. She is the niece of Ben Okri. Natalie has been singing since age four. At Britain's Got Talent (series 3), Natalie reached the semi-finals aged just ten years old. Her performance of No One by Alicia Keys is the 5th most watched Britain's Got Talent audition of all time on YouTube with over 130+ million views and almost half a million likes In 2009, The Telegraph reported that Natalie was bullied at school before her performance on television

In 2010, Natalie signed to Syco Entertainment, Simon Cowell`s recording label but left in 2012.

Natalie Okri made a decision in 2024 to take down some of her previous releases to reflect her growing influence on young people through platforms such as TikTok. She has stated she wants her music to be clean with an uplifting message to reflect her Christian values.

== Discography ==
- Don't you dare 2017
- No haters feat. Kadle 2017
- Needy feat. Weliwayo Boyz 2017
- Make up 2019
- Get it 2020
- Quarantine thoughts 2020
- Like that 2020
- Cheat 2020
- Slow and steady 2021
- Roll with me 2021 (Remix feat. Ramz (rapper) and Sneakbo 2021)
- Girls just wanna have fun 2022
- Readyo 2022
- Guns & Roses 2022 (Sneakbo feat. Natalie Okri)
- Blessings 2024
- HOT 2025
