= Can't Touch This (game show) =

2016 British game show

- Genre: Game show
- Presented by: Zoe Ball; Ashley Banjo
- Voices of: Sue Perkins
- Country of origin: United Kingdom
- Original language: English
- No. of series: 1
- No. of episodes: 10

Production
- Production locations: Titanic Quarter, Belfast, Northern Ireland
- Running time: 50 minutes
- Production company: Stellify Media

Original release
- Network: BBC One
- Release: 26 March – 8 October 2016

Can't Touch This is a BBC television game show that aired on BBC One from 26 March to 8 October 2016, hosted by Zoe Ball and Ashley Banjo. Filmed in Belfast and produced by Stellify Media, the show rated poorly and was not recommissioned.

== Production ==
The show was announced in March 2015, while Zoe Ball, Ashley Banjo, and Sue Perkins were announced as host, host, and narrator in September 2015. It was filmed without an audience at T13 in the Titanic Quarter in Belfast, Northern Ireland. The show was developed by Stellify Media, an independent Northern Irish production firm founded by Kieran Doherty and Matthew Worthy in spring 2014 and bankrolled by Sony Pictures Television, who also filmed a pilot for Fox. Intended for broadcast in 2016, the show was brought forward to replace The Getaway Car.

== Format ==
The show was filmed in a dark warehouse, with sixteen contestants playing. After being shot out of a catapult into a pit of foam, they traverse an obstacle course with eleven touchpoints; each touchpoint wins the player a prize, such as a television, cooking set, a coffee machine, a drone, and overseas trips including New York and Barcelona, while missing one incurs a fine of 30 seconds. The fastest six progress to round two, where they are spun in circles before traversing tangled netting and locating chairs; all bar that round's slowest contestant descend a water slide and cross wide rings, before that round's fastest four traverse a water tank using ropes with varying weight limits. The remaining three contestants gather three items from a spinning circuit, then ascend a small plastic mound with detachable handles. The winner then runs up and down an obstacle course trying to touch boxes depicting the prizes they won in round one, before jumping off a cliff with the intention of touching a car, winning it if they do so; BBC rules meant that the car was not branded on air.

== Reception and aftermath ==
Immediately prior to broadcast, Mark Lawson used a piece in The Guardian to cite Can't Touch This's top prize of an "unspecified marque" as an example of why the prizes on British game shows were "rubbish". Upon broadcast, Mark Gibbings-Jones of The Guardian unfavourably compared the show to Ninja Warrior UK, and wrote that "the contestants aren't the only ones falling flat on their faces", while Ian Hyland of The Daily Mirror wrote that both The Night Manager and Can't Touch This were examples of "how cuts have left BBC lurching between sublime and ridiculous". The show also received mixed reception on Twitter. In March 2017, the BBC confirmed that it would not make any more of the show; Louise McCreesh of Digital Spy blamed "unimpressive ratings and even less impressive reviews", and opined that "contestants falling on to foam mats" deprived the show of "well-needed jeopardy". In January 2018, Toby Olubi, who had been a contestant on the show, told PA Media that he had been "shot out of a cannon" on the programme, and described himself as a "human cannonball".

== Broadcast ==
Series	Start date	End date	Episodes	Notes
1	26 March 2016	8 October 2016	10	Series 1 took breaks on 23 April and 21 May, with the last episode being a 'best of'.
