= Britain's Got Talent series 3 =

Britain's Got Talent
- Series 3
- Hosted by: Ant & Dec (ITV); Stephen Mulhern (ITV2)
- Judges: Piers Morgan; Amanda Holden; Simon Cowell; Kelly Brook (Manchester auditions)
- Winner: Diversity
- Runner-up: Susan Boyle

Release
- Original network: ITV; ITV2 (BGMT)
- Original release: 11 April – 30 May 2009

Series chronology
- ← Previous; Series 2 Next → Series 4

Judges and Presenter(s) for Britain's Got Talent Series 3

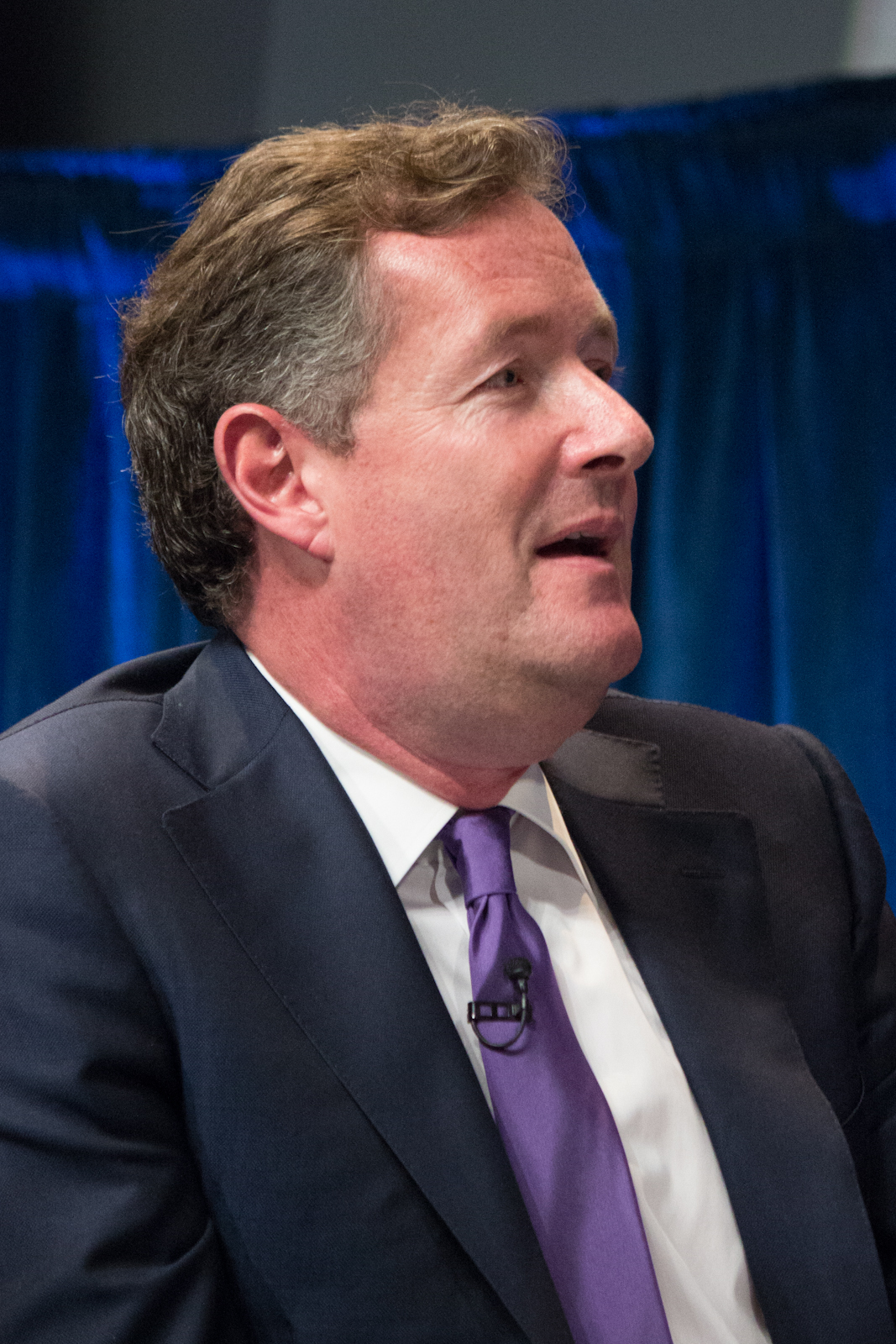
Piers Morgan

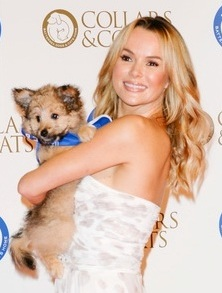
Amanda Holden

Simon Cowell

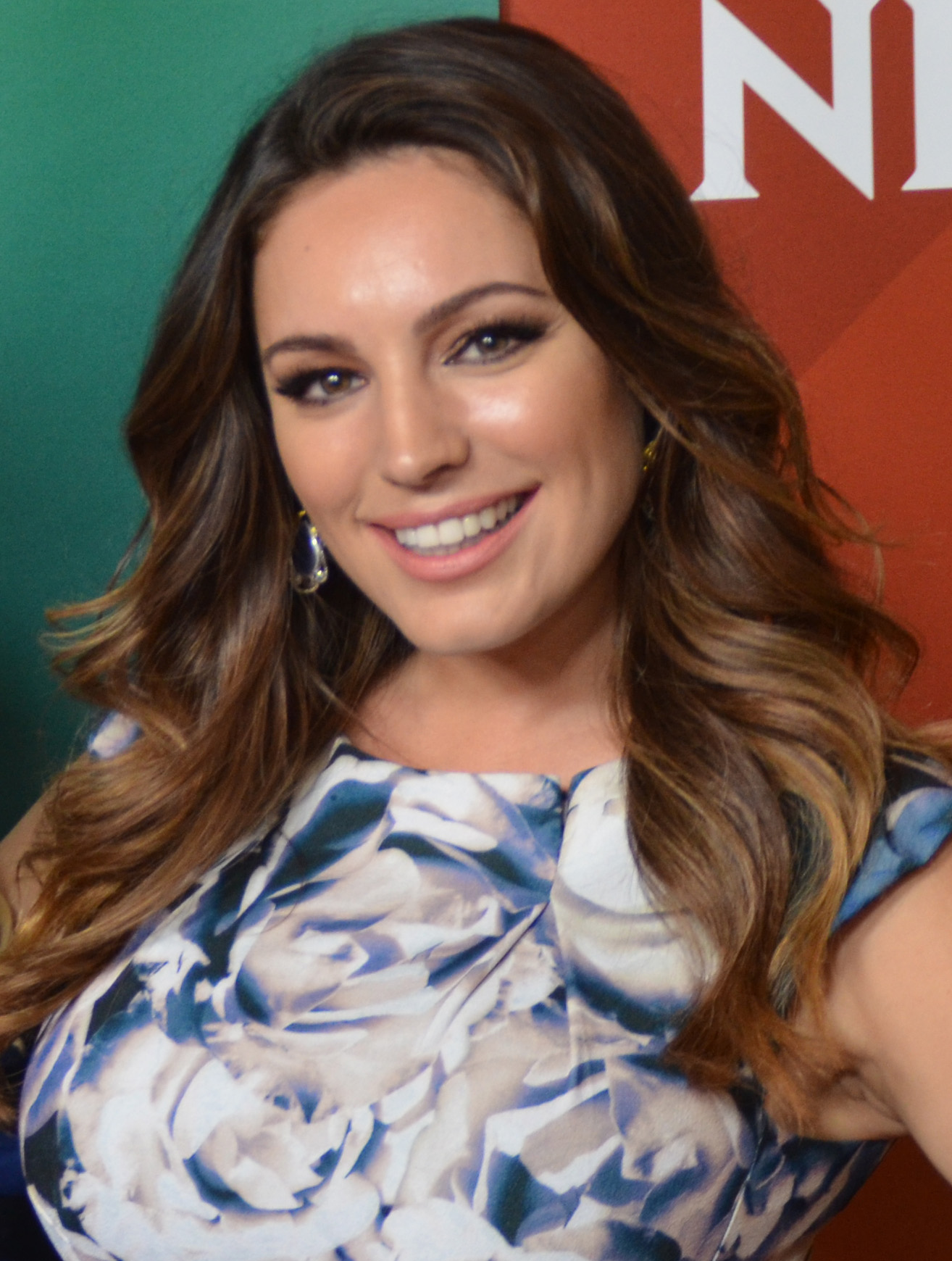
Kelly Brook (Guest)

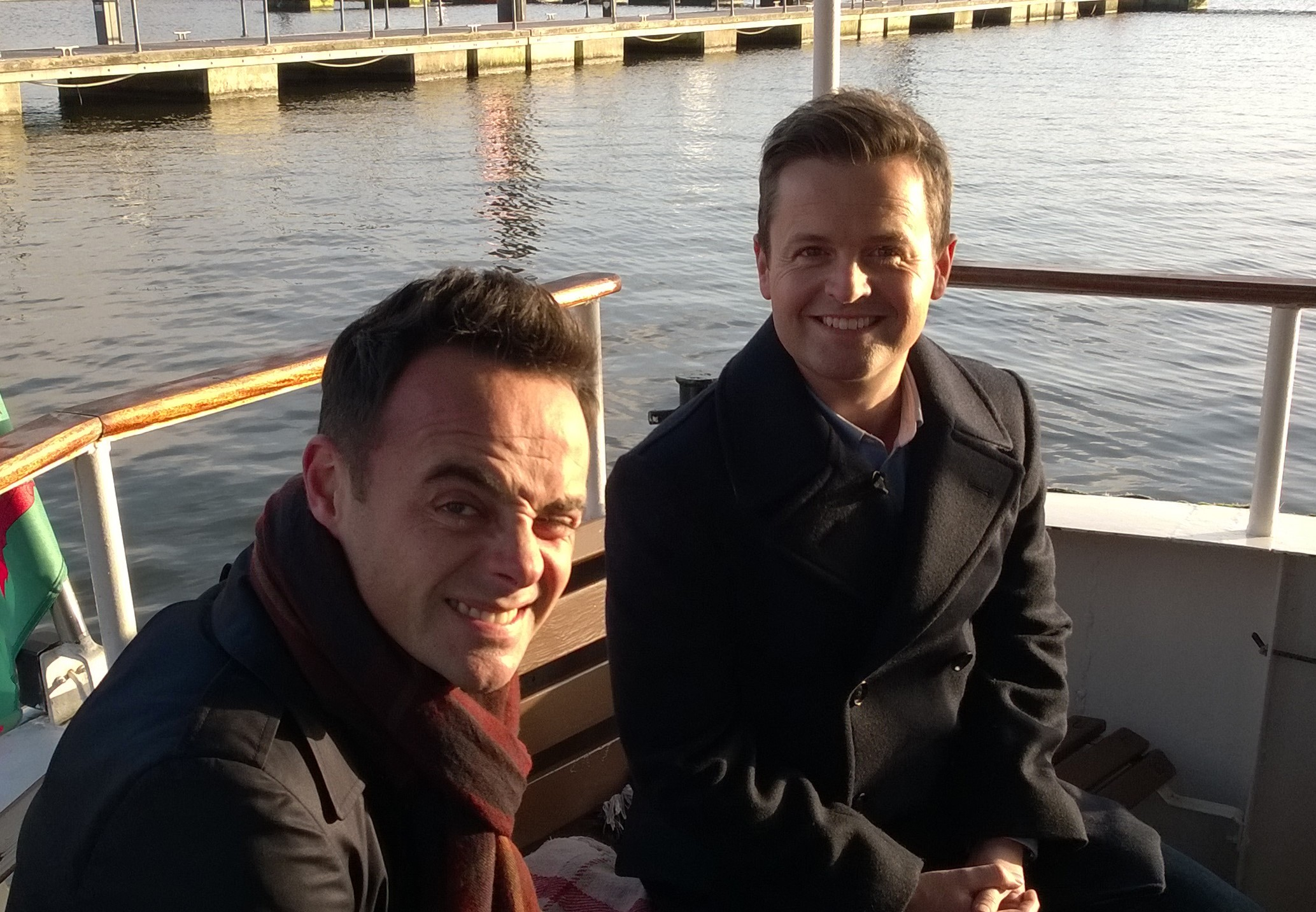
Ant & Dec (ITV1)

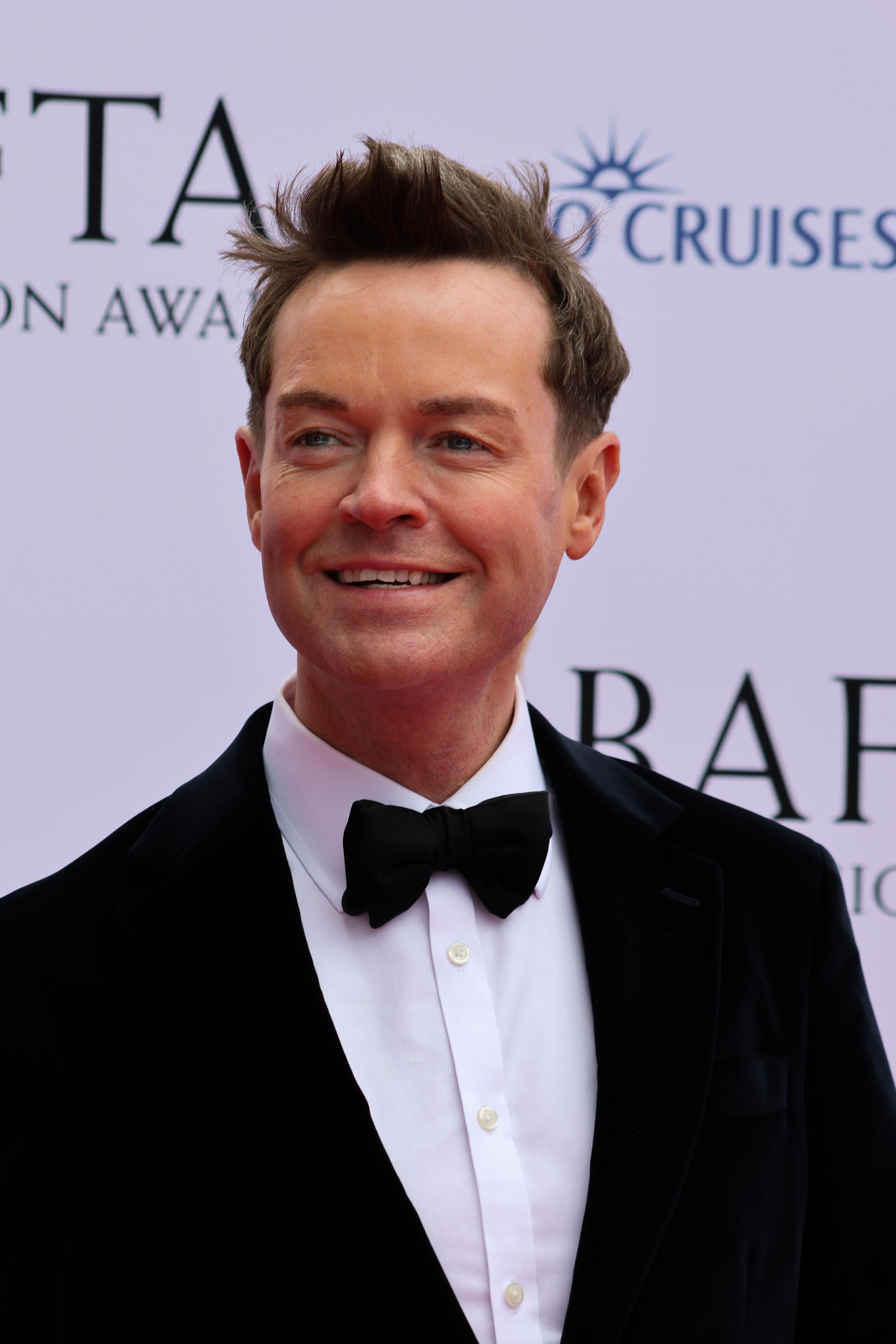
Stephen Mulhern (ITV2)

The third series of British talent competition programme Britain's Got Talent was broadcast on ITV, from 11 April to 30 May 2009. The judging panel of Simon Cowell, Amanda Holden and Piers Morgan returned from the previous series; a fourth judge, Kelly Brook, was added, but removed from the series shortly after filming began.

The third series was won by street dance troupe Diversity, with singer Susan Boyle finishing in second place and saxophonist Julian Smith third. During its broadcast, the series averaged around 13.3 million viewers, with the figures partly helped by the notable performances of Boyle during her time in on the show, with her audition on the third series considered the most iconic moment in the programme's history. The programme faced criticism during the third series for airing an unsuitable performance conducted in an audition, while Boyle's well-being became a major concern for producers following the final.

== Series overview ==
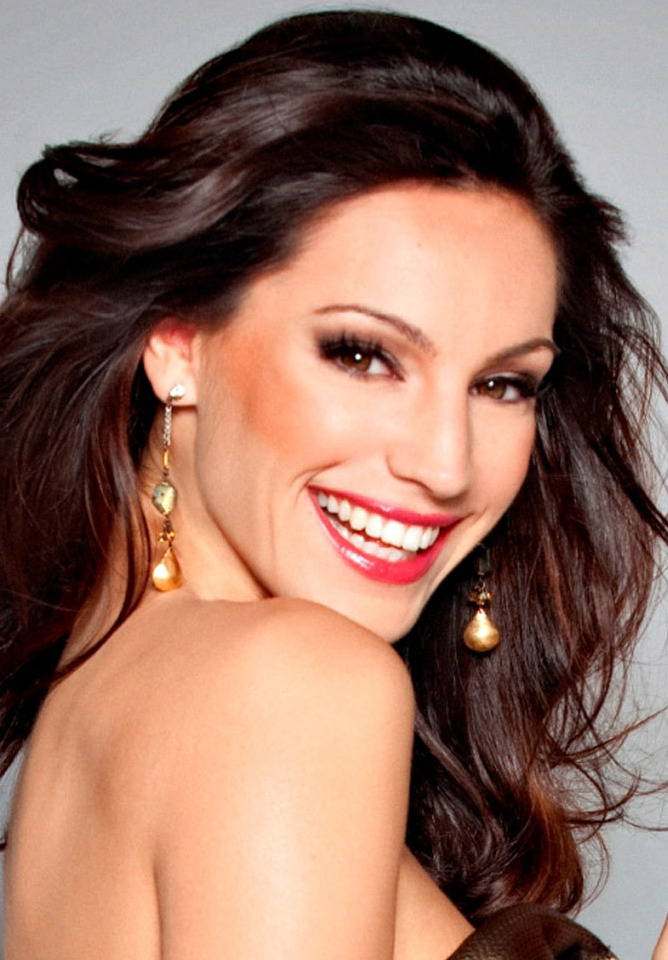
Brook was initially intended as a fourth judge, before producers relegated her to being a guest judge.

Following open auditions held the previous year, the Judges' auditions took place across January and February 2009, within Manchester, Glasgow, Birmingham, London and Cardiff. Prior to the auditions, Kelly Brook was announced as a permanent fourth judge. However, after six days of filming the Manchester auditions Brook was removed from the series. She was credited as a guest judge when her appearance was broadcast.

The third series proved popular amongst viewers for the performances of Susan Boyle, whom deemed her their favourite amongst the participants despite becoming the runner-up in the competition. Her performances made her internationally famous, launching her career as a singer, with her audition performance, involving her rendition of "I Dreamed a Dream" from the musical Les Misérables, being later posted to YouTube and earning around 100 million views within five days of its posting.

Of the participants that took part, only forty made it past this stage and into the five live semi-finals, with eight appearing in each one, and ten of these acts making it into the live final. The following below lists the results of each participant's overall performance in this series:

Key: Winner | Finalist | Runner-Up | Semi-finalist

Participant	Age(s) ^{1}	Genre	Performance Type	Semi-Final	Result
2 Grand	76 & 12	Singing	Singing Duo	4	Finalist
Aidan Davis	12	Dance	Street Dancer	5	Finalist
Ben & Becky	18 & 16	Dance	Dance Duo	3	Eliminated
Brit Chix	23–26	Singing / Music	Rock Band	4	Eliminated
Callum Francis	12	Singing	Singer	4	Eliminated
Darth Jackson	37	Dance	MJ & Darth Vader Dancer	1	Eliminated
DCD Seniors	14–21	Dance	Dance Group	5	Eliminated
Diversity	13–25	Dance	Street Dance Group	1	Winner
DJ Talent	30	Singing	Rapper	2	Eliminated
Fabia Cerra	35	Dance	Burlesque Dancer	4	Eliminated
Faces of Disco	24 & 30	Comedy / Dance	Comic Dance Duo	1	Eliminated
Flawless	20–31	Dance	Street Dance Group	2	Finalist
Floral High Notes	43 & 46	Singing / Variety	Opera Singer & Florist	3	Eliminated
Fred Bowers	73	Dance	Breakdancer	4	Eliminated
Gareth Oliver	28	Comedy	Ventriloquist	2	Eliminated
Good Evans	6–42	Singing	Singing Group	5	Eliminated
Greg Pritchard	24	Singing	Opera Singer	5	Eliminated
Harmony	14 & 16	Singing	Singing Duo	3	Eliminated
Hollie Steel	10	Singing	Singer	5	Finalist
Hot Honeyz	16–25	Dance	Dance Group	2	Eliminated
Jackie Prescott & Tippy Toes	40 & 2 ^{2}	Animals	Dog Act	4	Eliminated
Jamie Pugh	38	Singing	Opera Singer	2	Eliminated
Julia Naidenko	24	Dance	Belly Dancer	1	Eliminated
Julian Smith	40	Music	Saxophonist	4	Third Place
Kay Oresanya	31	Variety	Human Saxophonist	3	Eliminated
Luke Clements	36	Variety	Fruit Juggler	5	Eliminated
Martin "Gos" Matcham	35	Singing / Music	Singer & Guitarist	5	Eliminated
MD Showgroup	9–17	Dance	Dance Group	3	Eliminated
Merlin Cadogan	35	Danger	Escape Artist	2	Eliminated
Natalie Okri	10	Singing	Singer	1	Eliminated
Nick Hell	26	Danger	Sideshow Performer	1	Eliminated
Peter Coghlan	48	Dance	Drag Dancer	2	Eliminated
Shaheen Jafargholi	12	Singing	Singer	3	Finalist
Shaun Smith	17	Singing	Singer	2	Finalist
Stavros Flatley	13 & 40	Dance	Dance Duo	3	Finalist
Sue Son	24	Music	Electric Violinist	1	Eliminated
Sugar Free	16–23	Dance	Dance Group	4	Eliminated
Susan Boyle	48	Singing	Singer	1	Runner-Up
The Barrow Boys	18–27	Dance	Wheel Barrow Dance Trio	3	Eliminated
The Dreambears	29–34	Dance	Dance Trio	5	Eliminated

- ^1 Ages denoted for a participant(s), pertain to their final performance for this series.
- ^2 The latter value pertains to the age of the dog, as disclosed by its owner.

=== Semi-final summary ===
Buzzed out | Judges' vote | Advanced - Public Vote
Advanced - Judges' Vote | Eliminated - Judges' Vote | Eliminated

==== Semi-final 1 (24 May) ====
Semi-Finalist	Order	Performance Type	Buzzes and Judges' Vote			Percentage	Result
Semi-Finalist	Order	Performance Type	Cowell	Holden	Morgan	Percentage	Result
Diversity	1	Street Dance Group				36.2%	2nd (Won Judges' Vote)
Sue Son	2	Violinist				2.2%	4th - Eliminated
Darth Jackson	3	MJ & Darth Jackson Dancer				1.0%	5th - Eliminated
Natalie Okri	4	Singer				6.7%	3rd (Lost Judges' Vote)
Julia Naidenko	5	Belly Dancer				0.9%	6th - Eliminated
Nick Hell	6	Sideshow Performer				0.3%	8th - Eliminated
Faces of Disco	7	Comic Dance Duo				0.6%	7th - Eliminated
Susan Boyle	8	Singer				52.1%	1st (Won Public Vote)

==== Semi-final 2 (25 May) ====
Semi-Finalist	Order	Performance Type	Buzzes and Judges' Vote			Percentage	Result
Semi-Finalist	Order	Performance Type	Cowell	Holden	Morgan	Percentage	Result
DJ Talent	1	Rapper				4.7%	5th - Eliminated
Merlin Cadogan	2	Escape Artist				6.3%	4th - Eliminated
Hot Honeyz	3	Dance Group				1.1%	8th - Eliminated
Jamie Pugh	4	Opera Singer				2.5%	6th - Eliminated
Peter Coghlan	5	Drag Dancer				2.2%	7th - Eliminated
Gareth Oliver	6	Ventriloquist				7.4%	3rd (Lost Judges' Vote)
Shaun Smith	7	Singer				37.1%	2nd (Won Judges' Vote)
Flawless	8	Street Dance Group				38.7%	1st (Won Public Vote)

==== Semi-final 3 (26 May) ====
Semi-Finalist	Order	Performance Type	Buzzes and Judges' Vote			Percentage	Result
Semi-Finalist	Order	Performance Type	Cowell	Holden	Morgan	Percentage	Result
Harmony	1	Singing Duo				5.5%	4th - Eliminated
Kay Oresanya	2	Human Saxophonist				0.7%	7th - Eliminated
Ben & Becky	3	Dance Duo				2.6%	5th - Eliminated
Shaheen Jafargholi	4	Singer				26.3%	2nd (Won Judges' Vote)
The Barrow Boys	5	Wheel Barrow Dance Trio				1.3%	6th - Eliminated
MD Showgroup	6	Dance Group				12.7%	3rd (Lost Judges' Vote)
Floral High Notes	7	Opera Singer & Florist				0.5%	8th - Eliminated
Stavros Flatley	8	Dance Duo				50.4%	1st (Won Public Vote)

==== Semi-final 4 (28 May) ====
Semi-Finalist	Order	Performance Type	Buzzes and Judges' Vote			Percentage	Result
Semi-Finalist	Order	Performance Type	Cowell	Holden	Morgan	Percentage	Result
Sugar Free	1	Dance Group				0.4%	8th - Eliminated
Jackie Prescott & Tippy Toes	2	Dog Act				1.1%	6th - Eliminated
Callum Francis	3	Musical Theatre Performer				10.8%	3rd (Lost Judges' Vote)
Fred Bowers	4	Breakdancer				3.9%	4th - Eliminated
Brit Chix	5	Rock Band				0.5%	7th - Eliminated
Julian Smith	6	Saxophonist				56.7%	1st (Won Public Vote)
2 Grand	7	Singing Duo				24.6%	2nd (Won Judges' Vote)
Fabia Cerra	8	Burlesque Dancer				2.0%	5th - Eliminated

==== Semi-final 5 (29 May) ====
Semi-Finalist	Order	Performance Type	Buzzes and Judges' Vote			Percentage	Result
Semi-Finalist	Order	Performance Type	Cowell	Holden	Morgan	Percentage	Result
The Dreambears	1	Dance Trio				1.5%	6th - Eliminated
Good Evans	2	Vocal Group				2.2%	5th - Eliminated
Luke Clements	3	Fruit Juggler				0.4%	8th - Eliminated
Hollie Steel^{3}	4	Singer				26.0%	2nd (Won Judges' Vote)
Martin Matcham	5	Singer & Guitarist				0.9%	7th - Eliminated
Aidan Davis	6	Street Dancer				50.6%	1st (Won Public Vote)
DCD Seniors	7	Dance Group				8.6%	4th - Eliminated
Greg Pritchard	8	Opera Singer				9.8%	3rd (Lost Judges' Vote)

- ^3 Hollie Steel's original performance was stopped after she broke down, however she was allowed to perform again after Aidan Davis.

=== Final (30 May) ===
Winner | Runner-up | Third place

Finalist	Order	Performance Type	Percentage	Result
Flawless	1	Street Dance Group	3.6%	8th
Shaheen Jafargholi	2	Singer	3.8%	7th
Aidan Davis	3	Street Dancer	6.5%	5th
2 Grand	4	Singing Duo	1.0%	10th
Hollie Steel	5	Singer	3.9%	6th
Stavros Flatley	6	Dance Duo	16.3%	4th
Shaun Smith	7	Singer	3.4%	9th
Susan Boyle	8	Singer	20.2%	2nd
Diversity	9	Street Dance Group	24.9%	1st
Julian Smith	10	Saxophonist	16.4%	3rd

== Ratings ==
Episode	Air Date	Total Viewers (millions)	ITV1 Weekly rank	Viewer Share
Auditions 1	11 April	11.21	1	45.1%
Auditions 2	18 April	12.95	1	50.6%
Auditions 3	25 April	13.21	1	52.3%
Auditions 4	2 May	11.30	1	47.2%
Auditions 5	9 May	11.98	1	48.4%
Auditions 6	16 May	11.09	1	41.0%
Auditions 7	23 May	12.62	2	51.1%
Semi-final 1	24 May	12.93	1	49.2%
Semi-final 2	25 May	14.66	3	51.6%
Semi-final 3	26 May	13.56	5	49.9%
Semi-final 4	28 May	13.11	6	51.2%
Semi-final 5	29 May	13.84	4	57.3%
Live final	30 May	16.36	2	71%
Live final results	30 May	18.29	1	67.6%

== Criticism & incidents ==
The third series saw Britain's Got Talent face criticism for the involvement of burlesque dancer Fabia Cerra. The primary concern of the complaints that were raised were over the unsuitable nature of her performance being shown on a programme aimed at a family audience. Although Ofcom investigated the matter, ITV argued in their defence that production staff had done their utmost to edit all footage to censor all inappropriate scenes of her audition, making use of editing to avoid showing anything that would breach the regulator's broadcasting codes.

However, the involvement of Susan Boyle required greater attention from the programme's staff, most particularly in the live rounds as she grew in fame with her performances. Media attention on Boyle that brought forth a number of questionable claims, forced the finalist to check into the Priory psychiatric clinic in London to recover, leaving producers the task of ensuring she had privacy from the continual media intrusion into her private life. The increasing amount of attention from the general public, over her care and well being, led to the producers asking for assistance from the Press Complaints Commission, who issued instructions to press editors to adhere firmly to the code of press conduct in regards to its rules on privacy - this included not allowing unauthorised photography to take place and respecting Boyle's entitlement to privacy while she recovered from her involvement in the programme.
