= Tapering (mathematics) =

Kind of shape deformation

In mathematics, physics, and theoretical computer graphics, tapering is a kind of shape deformation. Just as an affine transformation, such as scaling or shearing, is a first-order model of shape deformation, tapering is a higher order deformation just as twisting and bending. Tapering can be thought of as non-constant scaling by a given tapering function. The resultant deformations can be linear or nonlinear.

To create a nonlinear taper, instead of scaling in x and y for all z with constants as in:

$$q= \begin{bmatrix}
a & 0 & 0 \\
0 & b & 0 \\
0 & 0 & 1
\end{bmatrix} p,$$

let a and b be functions of z so that:

$$q= \begin{bmatrix}
a(p_z) & 0 & 0 \\
0 & b(p_z) & 0 \\
0 & 0 & 1
\end{bmatrix} p.$$

An example of a linear taper is $a(z) = \alpha_0 + \alpha_1z$, and a quadratic taper $a(z) = {\alpha}_0 + {\alpha}_1z + {\alpha}_2z^2$.

As another example, if the parametric equation of a cube were given by ƒ(t) = (x(t), y(t), z(t)), a nonlinear taper could be applied so that the cube's volume slowly decreases (or tapers) as the function moves in the positive z direction. For the given cube, an example of a nonlinear taper along z would be if, for instance, the function T(z) = 1/(a + bt) were applied to the cube's equation such that ƒ(t) = (T(z)x(t), T(z)y(t), T(z)z(t)), for some real constants a and b.

== See also ==
- 3D projection
