= Julian Smith (saxophonist) =

British musician

- Also known as: Joolz Gianni
- Born: 21 April 1969 (age 57); Birmingham, Worcestershire, England
- Genres: Classical, jazz, soul, blues, funk, pop, reggae
- Occupations: Musician, songwriter
- Instruments: Saxophone, clarinet, bassoon
- Years active: 1993–present
- Label: Sony Music
- Member of: The Pussycat Dolls
- Website: juliansmithsax.co.uk

Julian Smith (born 21 April 1969 from Birmingham) is an English saxophonist and music teacher from Birmingham, England. He is also known by his stage name Joolz Gianni. He has made guest appearances alongside artists such as Tony Hadley (Spandau Ballet), Gwen Dickey (Rose Royce), Hamish Stuart and Steve Ferrone (Average White Band), and has performed on national television together with Chris Rea, M People, and Dina Carroll. In 2003, he released a solo album, Chilled 2 the Sax, which features Acker Bilk, Dina Carroll, and Ola Onabule. Smith became better known after appearing on the third series of Britain's Got Talent in 2009 and finished in third place behind singer Susan Boyle and winning dance troupe Diversity.

== Early life and education ==
Julian Smith is a native of Birmingham, England. His father was a music teacher, which allowed Smith to learn a variety of instruments as a child, including the clarinet. He attended the Royal Birmingham Conservatoire (then Birmingham School of Music / Birmingham Conservatoire) where he studied bassoon as his first study instrument with second study saxophone. He graduated with distinction in 1991. After graduating from the Conservatoire, Smith focused more on the saxophone.

== Career ==
=== Early career ===
Early in his career, Smith held teaching jobs with both Sandwell College and Cheltenham College. He also made guest appearances on records for Tony Hadley, and Hamish Stuart and performed live on national television with acts like Chris Rea, M People, and Dina Carroll. In 1993, Smith formed a band and eventually began operating under the stage name Joolz Gianni. Some of his tracks were featured on Sony Music's Classic Chillout compilation series from between 2001 and 2003. In 2003, he released a solo album as Joolz Gianni entitled Chilled 2 the Sax, which featured Acker Bilk, Dina Carroll, and Ola Onabule. After releasing his album Throughout This Time, he continued teaching music privately and playing small gigs.

=== Britain's Got Talent ===
In April 2009, Smith first appeared on an episode of the third series of Britain's Got Talent. During the audition round, he performed a version of "Somewhere" from the musical, West Side Story, on soprano saxophone. The audition received a standing ovation from the audience and praise from judges Simon Cowell, Piers Morgan, and Amanda Holden. Smith was subsequently chosen to be among the 40 semi-finalists who would perform live in May 2009. During his semi-final performance, Smith played a rendition of "All by Myself" and advanced to the final round by winning the public vote. For the final round on 30 May 2009, he played another rendition of "Somewhere," receiving around 700,000 votes(16.4% of the total vote) and placing as the second runner-up behind singer Susan Boyle and winning dance troupe Diversity. Smith later performed alongside the other 9 finalists on the nationwide Britain's Got Talent live tour in June 2009.

=== Post-Britain's Got Talent ===
In the ensuing years, Smith released several albums through Big Bear Records, including Somewhere and Christmas Songs and Lullabies (both in 2010). That year, he played a headlining gig at the Birmingham International Jazz and Blues Festival, was featured on the charitable single "The Prayer" for Classical Relief for Haiti, and toured with The Stylistics. He also performed a duet with Kenny G at the Royal Albert Hall and played for Prince Charles at Clarence House. In 2011, he went on a 48-date tour throughout the United Kingdom, and in 2012, he toured with Diversity on their "Digitized" tour. Smith continued touring throughout 2013, including a show with the winner of the first series of The X Factor, Steve Brookstein.

In 2015, he independently released a new album, Wonderful World.[5] In 2017, he toured the United States and Canada before returning to England where he performed a new concert series at St. Stephen's Church in Redditch. On New Year's Eve in 2020, Smith started a Zoom-based concert series. The shows, which are virtual due to the COVID-19 pandemic, feature various young performers playing multiple genres of music. Proceeds from the events were donated to the National Health Service.

== Personal life ==
Smith has two children with his wife Iraz and said that he entered Britain's Got Talent to "make life better for them".

== Discography ==
=== Studio album ===
Name	Year	Label
Chilled 2 the Sax (as Joolz Gianni)	2003 (UK)	Sony
Take a Breath	2009 (UK)	Big Bear Records
Somewhere	2010 (UK)	Big Bear Records
Ibiza Summer Sax	2010 (UK)	Big Bear Records
Christmas Songs & Lullabies	2010 (UK)	Big Bear Records
Wonderful World	2015 (UK)	Independent
At The Movies	2017 (UK)	Independent

==== Compilation appearances ====
Name	Year	Label
The Classic Chillout Album	2001	Sony Music Entertainment
The Classic Chillout Album 2	2001	Columbia Records
The New Classic Chillout Album	2002	Sony Music Entertainment
Open Space - The Classic Chillout Album 2	2002	Columbia Records
