= Railway Children (charity) =

British humanitarian organisation

- Location(s): Cheshire, CW11; United Kingdom
- Key people: Rob Capener, CEO
- Revenue: £4,092,955 (2022)
- Staff: 105 (2022)
- Volunteers: 18 (2022)
- Website: Official Website

Railway Children is a charity, based in the UK, which works with children who, due to poverty or other factors putting them at risk, are on the streets. The charity operates principally in the UK, India and Tanzania.

Fundraising activities are often centred around railway themed events and occasions.
