= The Writing on the Wall (Agents of S.H.I.E.L.D.) =

- Agents of S.H.I.E.L.D. episode
- Brian Van Holt's appearance in the episode ended the mystery of Coulson's resurrection and Project T.A.H.I.T.I., a recurring storyline since the pilot; this polarized critics.
- Episode no.: Season 2 Episode 7
- Directed by: Vincent Misiano
- Written by: Craig Titley
- Cinematography by: Feliks Parnell
- Editing by: Joshua Charson
- Original air date: November 11, 2014
- Running time: 42 minutes

Guest appearances
- B. J. Britt as Antoine Triplett; Henry Simmons as Alphonso "Mack" Mackenzie; Simon Kassianides as Sunil Bakshi; Adrianne Palicki as Bobbi Morse; Brian Van Holt as Sebastian Derik; Joel Gretsch as Hank Thompson; Monique Gabriela Curnen as Janice Robbins; Imelda Corcoran as Goodman

Episode chronology
← Previous "A Fractured House"	Next → "The Things We Bury"
- Agents of S.H.I.E.L.D. season 2

"The Writing on the Wall" is the seventh episode of the second season of the American television series Agents of S.H.I.E.L.D. Based on the Marvel Comics organization S.H.I.E.L.D., it follows Phil Coulson and his team of S.H.I.E.L.D. agents as they hunt two killers: one a former friend and prisoner, the other with possible answers concerning Coulson's mysterious resurrection. It is set in the Marvel Cinematic Universe (MCU) and acknowledges the franchise's films. The episode was written by Craig Titley and directed by Vincent Misiano.

Clark Gregg reprises his role as Coulson from the film series, and is joined by principal cast members Ming-Na Wen, Brett Dalton, Chloe Bennet, Iain De Caestecker, Elizabeth Henstridge, and Nick Blood. Brian Van Holt guest stars as a former S.H.I.E.L.D. agent resurrected by the same program that Coulson was.

"The Writing on the Wall" originally aired on ABC on November 11, 2014, and according to Nielsen Media Research, was watched by 4.27 million viewers. The episode received a mostly positive critical response, with the conclusion of Phil Coulson's resurrection storyline, started in the pilot, and Grant Ward's story in the episode receiving praise, though those two points were also criticized by some.

== Plot ==
A man is invited to a young art teacher's apartment one night, where he reveals alien designs tattooed all over his body. He assures the young woman that they have met before, and pulls out a knife to help her remember. The woman, Janice Robbins, was once a S.H.I.E.L.D. agent, and in crime scene photos Agent Skye shows Director Phil Coulson, her body has been carved with the alien symbols. Coulson and Skye search her apartment and find many paintings she had made of the symbols. Agent Jemma Simmons performs an autopsy on the body, and discovers that both the victim and the killer had the GH-325 drug in their blood. Coulson believes the only way to get answers is to use Hydra's memory machine on himself, knowing that doing so would be like torture. Meanwhile, the fugitive Grant Ward is spotted by Agent Antoine Triplett accessing one of his hot boxes, where he has money and supplies. Triplett lets him go when he realizes that Ward has rigged himself with an explosive in case S.H.I.E.L.D. attempts to take him. Evading Agent Bobbi Morse, Ward gets on a bus to Boston, though Agent Lance Hunter is already on board, ready to follow him.

In the memory machine, Coulson remembers the patients of the T.A.H.I.T.I. project, who all first appeared to be normal, before going crazy and obsessively drawing alien symbols everywhere. Coulson wanted to shut down the program and destroy the alien host immediately but was presented with a different option – erasing the patients' memories so that they would have no knowledge of what was done to them and could carry out normal lives. In the machine, Coulson struggles to remember the patients' names, eventually succeeding. Realizing that one of them, Sebastian Derik, has been targeting the other patients of the project, Coulson rushes to the only other survivor, Hank Thompson, hoping to get there first, locking Skye in a holding cell so that she cannot interfere with his desperate attempts to discover the truth. Coulson holds Thompson at gunpoint, attempting to learn all that Thompson knows about the symbols he has been drawing, but Thompson has not been drawing them and knows nothing. Derik knocks Coulson out from behind, binds and gags Thompson in his workshop, and ties up Coulson. Derik informs Coulson that pain drew out his suppressed memories, which is how he found all the other T.A.H.I.T.I. patients. Thompson escapes from his bindings, and some deep-rooted S.H.I.E.L.D. training helps him assist Coulson in breaking free as well. Thompson rushes his family to safety while Coulson struggles with Derik. Skye and Alphonso "Mack" Mackenzie arrive and threaten to shoot Coulson, who has Derik trapped by the neck. However, Coulson is not trying to kill Derik, rather he is trying to get him to look down at a large toy train track Thompson had constructed: it is a 3D model of the alien writing, which is actually the blueprints of a city. Thompson had created it in the image of the city without realizing.

Thompson turns down Coulson's offer to rejoin S.H.I.E.L.D. while Derik is turned over to authorities, having found his peace. Coulson has also found peace; as realizing the writing is in fact a 3D diagram has satisfied his compulsion to carve the symbols. In a bar in Boston, Ward meets Hydra agent Sunil Bakshi, and informs him that he wants to meet Whitehall. When Melinda May's S.H.I.E.L.D. team storms the bar, they find Ward gone and everyone dead, except Bakshi, who Ward left as a gift to Coulson. Coulson vows that they will find Ward eventually, and will take advantage of his gift. Coulson then briefs all personnel at the Playground about the city blueprints, explaining that he is not crazy and has been trying to solve a puzzle, just like Hydra. S.H.I.E.L.D.'s primary task now is to find the mystery city before anyone else.

In an end tag, Ward calls Skye and promises to keep sending "gifts" from time to time, before hanging up and preparing to deal with his brother, Senator Christian Ward.

== Production ==
=== Development ===
In October 2014, Marvel announced that the seventh episode of the season would be titled "The Writing on the Wall", to be written by Craig Titley, with Vincent Misiano directing.

=== Writing ===
Asked if Coulson will be "back to normal" following this episode, star Clark Gregg said "He really felt like he was losing it in the first part of this episode. Since he was going around trying to figure out who was going to pull his plug, that's a real concern. I don't want to die again. I was so surprised when it got to that bit in the script at the table read. I was like, "Oh, am I better now?" And they went, "Well, let's just say you aren't crazily carving anymore."" On whether he will have the same drive to find the newly revealed city, Gregg said "One of the really cool sci-fi elements of this show is that whatever this is, it seems to have been around for a while, and once it gets into your system, it starts to influence your behavior. I've seen a couple of really creepy, scary nature specials lately about insects who do this, that infect another species of insect and get them to do their bidding, often in a suicidal way. There's something kind of sinister about it like that. I don't know that having solved the carving element of it or figuring out the city part of it is going to completely mean that that alien tissue is done with him."

Talking about the motivations of Ward in the episode, Gregg explained "Ward seems to think that he's redeemable, and yet for every step he takes that seems to be about mending fences with either Skye or Coulson, he seems to do something that's equally psychotic. The speech that was in last week's episode, the bit between the two of them before he turned Ward over, it seems like Coulson takes the deaths of Victoria Hand and others very seriously. I don't see how Ward is going to explain that away, from Coulson's point of view." Then asked if Coulson would kill Ward, Gregg stated "That question actually goes right to the heart of Coulson. Would he want to? I'm sure Coulson does, but I also feel like there's a cost to not being Hydra. To Coulson, there's a very clear line that you cross over when you indulge your more primitive retribution-based desires, that suddenly really starts to rupture the membrane between you and what you're fighting against."

=== Casting ===
In October 2014, Marvel revealed that main cast members Clark Gregg, Ming-Na Wen, Brett Dalton, Chloe Bennet, Iain De Caestecker, Elizabeth Henstridge, and Nick Blood would star as Phil Coulson, Melinda May, Grant Ward, Skye, Leo Fitz, Jemma Simmons, and Lance Hunter, respectively. It was also revealed that the guest cast for the episode would include B. J. Britt as Antoine Triplett, Adrianne Palicki as Bobbi Morse, Henry Simmons as Alphonso "Mack" Mackenzie, Imelda Corcoran as Dr. Goodman, Simon Kassianides as Sunil Bakshi, Joel Gretsch as Hank Thompson, Monica Lacy as Katie Thompson, Monique Gabriela Curnen as Janice Robbins / Agent Stevens, Bruno Amato as Bartender, Carlos Campos as Patient #2 and, Michael Hanson Seaver as Patient #4, Natalie Smyka as Patient #5, Richie Cottrell as Eliza's son, Madison Lee as Lab Assistant, and Brian Van Holt as Sebastian Derik. However, Corcoran, Lacy, Amato, Campos, Seaver, Smyka, Cottrell, and Lee did not receive guest star credit in the episode. Britt, Palicki, Simmons, Corcoran, Kassianides, and Van Holt all reprise their roles from earlier in the series.

=== Marvel Cinematic Universe tie-ins ===
In the episode, Ward mentions Hydra leader Baron von Strucker, who first appeared in Captain America: The Winter Soldier.

== Release ==
=== Broadcast ===
"The Writing on the Wall" was first aired in the United States on ABC on November 11, 2014. It was aired alongside the US broadcast in Canada on CTV.

=== Home media ===
The episode began streaming on Netflix on June 11, 2015, and was released along with the rest of the second season on September 18, 2015, on Blu-ray and DVD. The episode, along with the rest of the series, was removed from Netflix on February 28, 2022, and later became available on Disney+ on March 16, 2022.

== Reception ==
=== Ratings ===
In the United States the episode received a 1.5/4 percent share among adults between the ages of 18 and 49, meaning that it was seen by 1.5 percent of all households, and 4 percent of all of those watching television at the time of the broadcast. It was watched by 4.27 million viewers. The Canadian broadcast gained 2.29 million viewers, the third highest for that day, and the ninth highest for the week.

=== Critical response ===
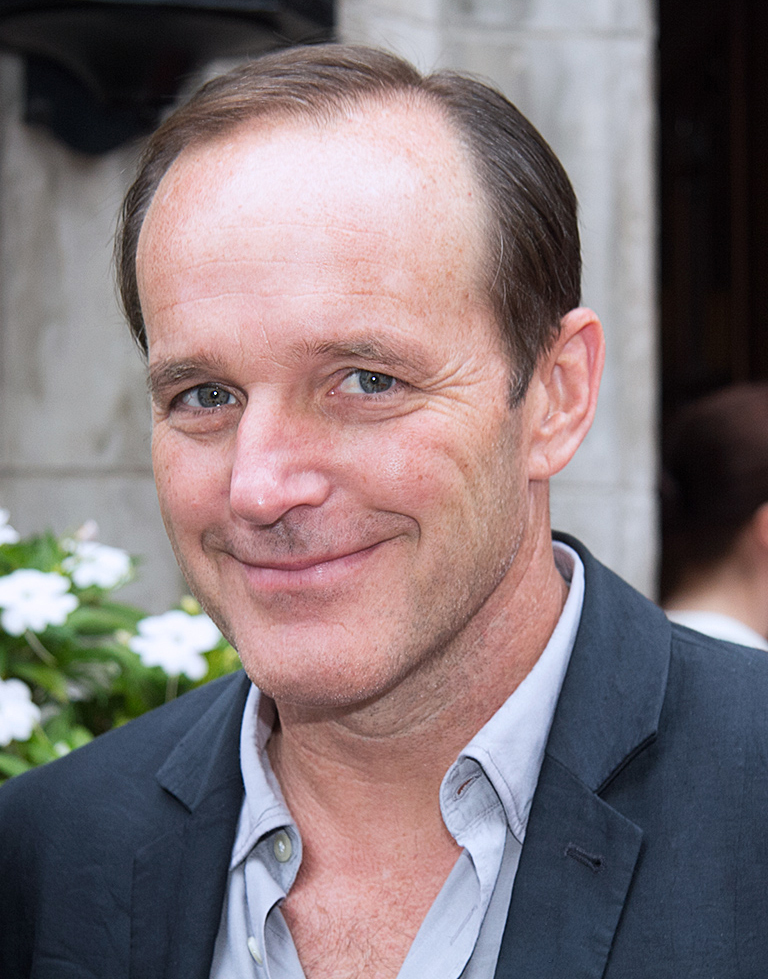
Clark Gregg's performance in the episode was praised by critics, as the character was driven to new, darker actions.

Oliver Sava of The A.V. Club graded the episode a "B", feeling happy that the secrets behind Coulson's resurrection were fully revealed, and being positive about the possible directions for the series to go following the episode, including Ward's storyline, with Sava saying "Brett Dalton continues to be far more charismatic as a bad guy". James Hunt gave an extremely negative review of the episode for Den of Geek, saying "just as you were getting comfortable with Agents of S.H.I.E.L.D. being an entertaining and well-made piece of television – along comes this. An episode so disjointed and randomly constructed that it could've come right out of season one....It's possible that's just the content of the story...the show has to return to some of last season's most ill-judged plotlines and put its own ones effectively on hold in the meantime." He also felt that the tone of the episode was off, "Weird writing in your brain that turns you into a carving-obsessed maniac isn't what you'd call a classic Marvel-type plot, and sits ill at ease with the more clear-cut superheroic tone of the previous few episodes." Ultimately, Hunt said, "For a season that's done quite well on moving plots forward from episode to episode, the shift back towards a self-contained (if unstructured) episode-length story is a disappointment." Conversely, Eric Goldman of IGN scored the episode a 9 out of 10, indicating an "Amazing" episode, praising Gregg's performance and the lengths his character went to get answers, as well as a "scary" Ward, saying "he feels dangerous and mentally unbalanced and the fact that he may believe he's doing good now only adds to the freakiness." Goldman was also pleased with the potential MCU connections implied in the episode.

Joseph McCabe at Nerdist called the episode "not as satisfying" as "A Hen in the Wolf House" or "A Fractured House", but said that it "matches their relentless pace and momentum...The scenes in which Coulson goes into his past are suitably disturbing, making excellent use of a small set and high-contrast lighting." He added that "It's to S.H.I.E.L.D.'s immense credit that it's learned how to make even the scenes of agents following Ward compelling", and felt that "one of the most satisfying elements of S.H.I.E.L.D.'s second season is how all of its new characters feel lived in. We fully believe they've each had their own countless adventures." McCabe gave Hunter and Morse (especially Palicki's performance) as examples of this. Kevin Fitzpatrick of ScreenCrush praised the conclusion of the Coulson resurrection storyline, the way it tied several smaller storylines together, its potential connections to the MCU, and its pace, while also saying "turning Ward evil continually proves itself among the best possible salvages of a bland character, as Brett Dalton clearly relishes in the ex-agent's newfound freedom, not only from the cell, but from his S.H.I.E.L.D. persona at large." Ultimately Fitzpatrick felt that "Best of all has been Agents of S.H.I.E.L.D. taking care to make the journey every bit as important as the destination, and "The Writing on the Wall" kept some important character beats in play as it delivered impressive revelations about the alien writing, and its larger role in the Marvel Cinematic Universe...It's really rewarding to see Agents of S.H.I.E.L.D. deliver so consistently these days". Alan Sepinwall, writing for HitFix, praised Gregg's performance and the Coulson resurrection storyline coming "to a welcome end". He "found the manhunt for Ward the more compelling end of things: a tight mix of spycraft, suspense, and the ongoing question of what exactly Ward's agenda is, and what the show intends to do with him long-term...this smug villainous side suits Brett Dalton so much better than when he was SquareJaw McBoring in season 1."

=== Accolades ===
In June 2016, IGN ranked the episode as the fourth best in the series at that point.
