= The Things We Bury =

- Agents of S.H.I.E.L.D. episode
- The confrontation between Christian and Grant Ward in the episode, though called "fascinating", was noted for feeling rushed, and disjointed from the rest of the episode.
- Episode no.: Season 2 Episode 8
- Directed by: Milan Cheylov
- Written by: DJ Doyle
- Cinematography by: Feliks Parnell
- Editing by: David Crabtree; Kelly Stuyvesant
- Original air date: November 18, 2014
- Running time: 42 minutes

Guest appearances
- Kyle MacLachlan as "The Doctor"; B. J. Britt as Antoine Triplett; Henry Simmons as Alphonso "Mack" Mackenzie; Adrianne Palicki as Bobbi Morse; Simon Kassianides as Sunil Bakshi; Hayley Atwell as Peggy Carter; Reed Diamond as Werner Reinhardt / Daniel Whitehall; Tim DeKay as Christian Ward; Dichen Lachman as The Doctor's wife

Episode chronology
← Previous "The Writing on the Wall"	Next → "...Ye Who Enter Here"
- Agents of S.H.I.E.L.D. season 2

"The Things We Bury" is the eighth episode of the second season of the American television series Agents of S.H.I.E.L.D. Based on the Marvel Comics organization S.H.I.E.L.D., it follows Phil Coulson and his team of S.H.I.E.L.D. agents as they search for a hidden alien city, and discover secrets about their enemies. It is set in the Marvel Cinematic Universe (MCU) and acknowledges the franchise's films. The episode was written by DJ Doyle and directed by Milan Cheylov.

Clark Gregg reprises his role as Coulson from the film series, and is joined by principal cast members Ming-Na Wen, Brett Dalton, Chloe Bennet, Iain De Caestecker, Elizabeth Henstridge, and Nick Blood. Hayley Atwell reprises her role from other MCU projects in flashbacks with connections to the television series Agent Carter and the films Captain America: The First Avenger and Captain America: The Winter Soldier.

"The Things We Bury" originally aired on ABC on November 18, 2014, and according to Nielsen Media Research, was watched by 4.58 million viewers. The episode received a mostly positive critical response, with the episode's flashback sequences, and the performance of MacLachlan, praised, but an issue of "over-crowding" of storylines was frequently brought up by critics.

== Plot ==
In Austria, 1945, Nazi scientist Werner Reinhardt is experimenting on the mysterious Obelisk, forcing test subjects to touch it and noting how it turns them into stone. However, one young Chinese woman does not turn into stone upon touching it, instead causing glowing symbols to appear on the device. Before further experimenting can be done on her, news of the defeat of Red Skull (Note: As depicted in Captain America: The First Avenger.) comes, soon followed by the arrival of the Allied forces. In the present day, Reinhardt, now known as Daniel Whitehall, is told by "The Doctor" that to unlock the true power of the Obelisk, which he calls The Diviner, it must be taken to a "special place", a hidden alien city, by a "special person", someone that it divines to be worthy of the power.

S.H.I.E.L.D. Agent Bobbi Morse, while interrogating captured Hydra member Sunil Bakshi, realizes that Whitehall and Red Skull are connected in some way, even though the latter has been dead for 70 years. In old Strategic Scientific Reserve (S.S.R., the precursor to S.H.I.E.L.D.) files, the S.H.I.E.L.D. agents discover that Agent Peggy Carter had taken the Obelisk and Reinhardt into custody, and he had told Carter a story about "blue angels" who came to Earth long ago to conquer it. After seeing the results of Reinhardt's experiments, Carter refused to let him work for the U.S., and instead imprisoned him for life. Then, in 1989, Reinhardt was ordered to be released by Hydra agent Alexander Pierce, and on returning to Austria, found the same young woman who was unaffected by the Obelisk, who seems to have not aged a day. Reinhardt dissects her, finds what "made her so special", and uses it to become young himself, before taking on the name "Whitehall". Morse reveals to Bakshi what they learned of his boss, and realizing that it was his fault, he attempts to commit suicide with a cyanide capsule.

At the Ward family summer home, Senator Christian Ward arrives and finishes his call to a woman. Grant rips him out of his car window and takes him to "the Well", where Grant claims Christian had forced him to torture their younger brother Thomas as children, but Christian claims Grant did it of his own free will. Grant forces Christian to admit that he wanted Thomas dead because he was the only one that their mother had not tortured growing up. Recording this confession, Grant then apparently murders Christian and their parents, a news report of which is playing as Grant discusses with Whitehall about working for Hydra again.

Meanwhile, S.H.I.E.L.D. Director Phil Coulson, and Agents Skye, Leo Fitz, and Antoine Triplett hack into a satellite feed to search for the alien city. They are attacked by Hydra, and Triplett is shot. One of the on-site civilians is a doctor, and offers to help, but in talking with Coulson, accidentally reveals himself to be "The Doctor", Skye's father. He does not want to meet Skye yet, but cannot wait to, and gets angry when Coulson refers to her by that name, asserting that it is not her real name. Soon after, the satellite finds the hidden city.

In an end tag, "The Doctor" joins Whitehall and Ward. He says to Whitehall that it is always good to look your enemy in the eye. In a flashback to 1989, "The Doctor" finds the remains of the young woman, who is his wife, and vows to find Whitehall and "tear him apart".

== Production ==
=== Development ===
In October 2014, Marvel announced that the eighth episode of the season would be titled "The Things We Bury", to be written by DJ Doyle, with Milan Cheylov directing.

=== Writing ===
Asked whether Christian Ward lied to his brother to save himself in the episode, Executive producer Maurissa Tancharoen said "After seeing the Ward brothers together, these are the questions we had hoped the audience would be asking. Grant had painted such a horrible portrait of Christian, and we believed him. But when we finally meet Christian in the flesh, not only does he seem like a decent man, he has a very different take on the stories Grant has told. Then Grant makes Christian a victim before our very eyes, forcing him to admit "the truth." So, who do you choose to believe?" On the potential interactions between Grant Ward and "The Doctor" introduced at the end of the episode, she said "We have a few uneasy alliances between characters on the show this year. The Doctor and Ward is another relationship we're introducing. Both of these men are complicated, it's hard to tell where their true intentions lie. They've each displayed some rather unpredictable and unsavory behavior. Seeing them "work together" will be interesting to say the least."

=== Casting ===
In October 2014, Marvel revealed that main cast members Clark Gregg, Ming-Na Wen, Brett Dalton, Chloe Bennet, Iain De Caestecker, Elizabeth Henstridge, and Nick Blood would star as Phil Coulson, Melinda May, Grant Ward, Skye, Leo Fitz, Jemma Simmons, and Lance Hunter, respectively. It was also revealed that the guest cast for the episode would include B. J. Britt as Antoine Triplett, Adrianne Palicki as Bobbi Morse, Henry Simmons as Alphonso "Mack" Mackenzie, Reed Diamond as Werner Reinhardt / Daniel Whitehall, Tim DeKay as Senator Christian Ward, Kyle MacLachlan as "The Doctor", Hayley Atwell as Peggy Carter, Simon Kassianides as Sunil Bakshi, Lou Ferrigno Jr. as Agent Hauer, Al Coronel as Agent Rivera, Dichen Lachman as the young woman and the Doctor's wife, Eijiro Ozaki as prisoner, Alexander Leeb as scientist, and Willem Van Der Vegt as officer. However, Ferrigno, Coronel, Ozaki, Leeb, and Van Der Vegt did not receive guest star credit in the episode. Britt, Palicki, Simmons, Diamond, DeKay, MacLachlan, Atwell, and Kassianides all reprise their roles from earlier in the series.

=== Marvel Cinematic Universe tie-ins ===
Hayley Atwell reprises her film role as Peggy Carter again in the season ahead of her own series, in flashback sequences that include mention of Red Skull and his death, both depicted in the film Captain America: The First Avenger, and Alexander Pierce, who appeared in Captain America: The Winter Soldier.

== Release ==
=== Broadcast ===
"The Things We Bury" was first aired in the United States on ABC on November 18, 2014. It was aired alongside the U.S. broadcast in Canada on CTV.

=== Home media ===
The episode began streaming on Netflix on June 11, 2015, and was released along with the rest of the second season on September 18, 2015, on Blu-ray and DVD. The episode, along with the rest of the series, was removed from Netflix on February 28, 2022, and later became available on Disney+ on March 16, 2022.

== Reception ==
=== Ratings ===
In the United States the episode received a 1.6/5 percent share among adults between the ages of 18 and 49, meaning that it was seen by 1.6 percent of all households, and 5 percent of all of those watching television at the time of the broadcast. It was watched by 4.58 million viewers. The Canadian broadcast gained 2.22 million viewers, the fourth highest for the day, and the eight highest for the week.

=== Critical response ===
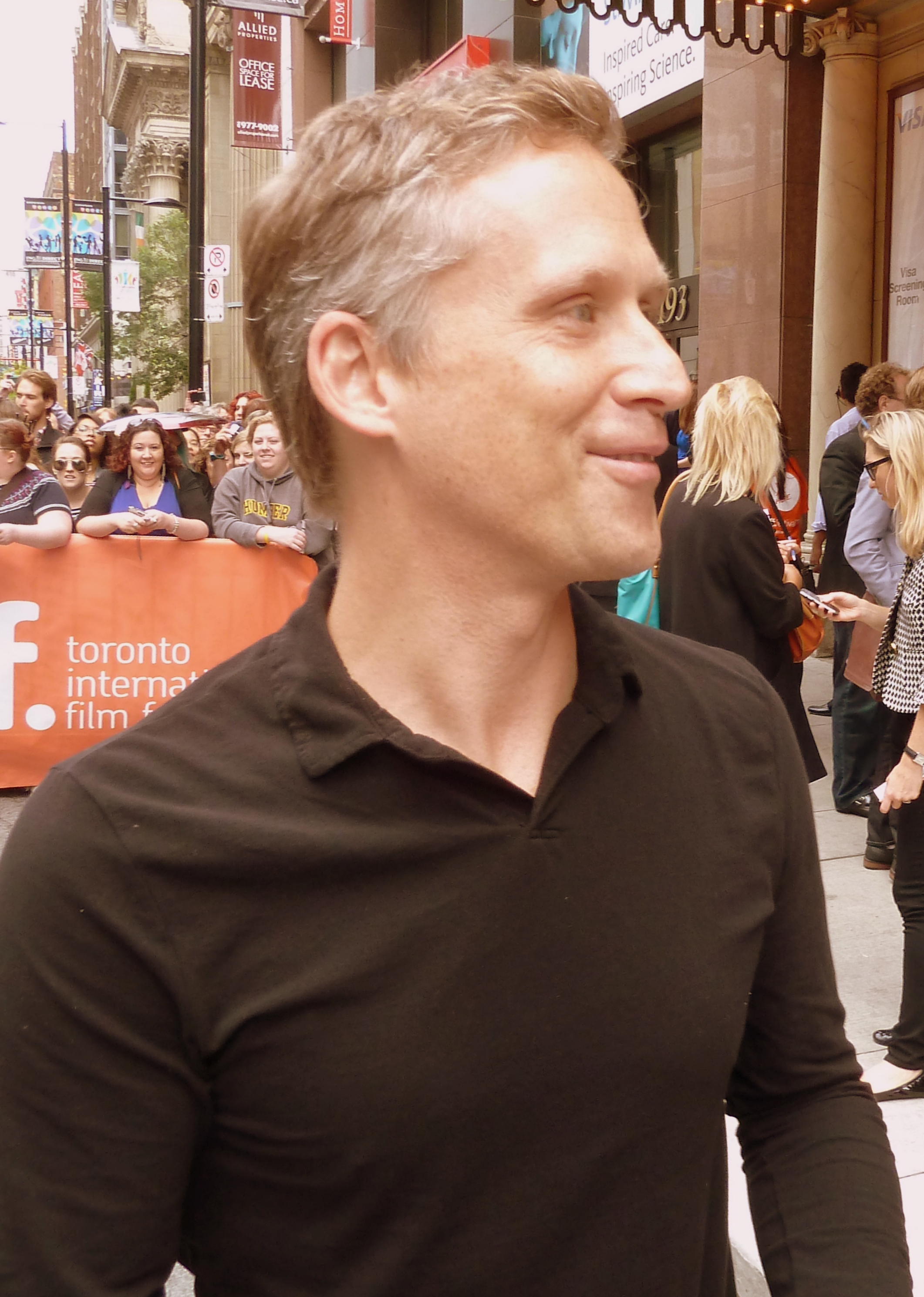
Flashback sequences in the episode, featuring Reed Diamond as Werner Reinhardt, were noted by critics for their revelations about overarching storylines, their connections to the MCU, and their bold directorial choices for the series.

James Hunt gave a mixed review of the episode at Den of Geek, focusing on its place in the series and where the overarching storylines were moving at that point. He was positive about some of the character development, specifically that for Coulson and Whitehall, and he ended his review saying "I'm not entirely sure about Kyle MacLachlan's character, but at least he's fun to watch. It's the actors who treat S.H.I.E.L.D. like melodrama that seem to work the best, and MacLachlan's got that happening in spades. I don't know how I'm supposed to feel about the character, but I like when he turns up, and that puts him ahead of last season's antagonists by some distance." Conversely, Joseph McCabe of Nerdist gave a very positive review, saying "the machinations of the show's writing staff are much appreciated" – in reference to the complexities of the Ward brothers' relationship – while calling MacLachlan "the standout performer in [the] episode". He concluded saying "If the show's producers keep the momentum going half as well as they have for the past several episodes, by mid-season S.H.I.E.L.D. will finally be the show its fans have always deserved." Eric Goldman scored the episode 8.8 out of 10, indicating a "Great" episode, for IGN, with positives including the reveal of Lachman portraying Skye's mother, the "fascinating" confrontation between the Ward brothers, MacLachlan's "absolutely terrific" performance, and connections to the MCU, on which Goldman said "Unlike Season 1, where initial episodes would simply remind viewers that Coulson was present for the events of the Avengers over and over, the way the connections are happening this season feel way more organic and add to the history of the MCU."

Oliver Sava, writing for The A.V. Club, graded the episode a "B", saying "Marvel's Agents Of S.H.I.E.L.D. has a stronger narrative direction, more complicated character relationships, and a deeper connection to Marvel lore in its second season, but it still has trouble delivering the intrigue expected from a TV series about secret agents in a superhero universe." He lamented the "Bland direction" of the series, but found "the time-lapse of Werner Reinhardt aging in his S.H.I.E.L.D. cell over 44 years" in the episode to be a bold decision, something that the rest of the episode's direction needed. He also felt that there were too many storylines, causing important emotional sequences, like the Ward brothers' confrontation, to not be given the appropriate weight. Sava did, however, praise MacLachlan's "passionate performance" which he also called "scary", "primal", and "an essential part of the series". Alan Sepinwall of HitFix was positive about the overarching storyline elements that were revealed and developed in the episode, and praised Palicki's performance. He did say, though, he is "still waiting for season 2 to give [him] an entire hour that feels like more than the sum of its many excellent individual parts (on-screen and off)." Kevin Fitzpatrick, in his review for ScreenCrush, was impressed by the "burst of speed to a second season already keeping momentum far more efficiently than its predecessor" introduced in the episode, but felt that it could have been improved if the storylines were more cohesive, singling out the Ward brothers' scenes as "more of an effort to tie off the remaining season 1 threads". He ended saying the episode "had the added benefit of strong scenes like Whitehall's transition to the modern day, Bobbi's interrogation, or Coulson's confrontation with the Doctor, though I can't imagine the hour leaving behind many memorable impressions a few months, or even weeks, down the line."

=== Accolades ===
In June 2016, IGN ranked the episode as the tenth best in the series.
