= A Hen in the Wolf House =

- Agents of S.H.I.E.L.D. episode
- Episode no.: Season 2 Episode 5
- Directed by: Holly Dale
- Written by: Brent Fletcher
- Cinematography by: Allan Westbrook
- Editing by: Eric Litman
- Original air date: October 21, 2014
- Running time: 42 minutes

Guest appearances
- Kyle MacLachlan as "The Doctor"; B. J. Britt as Antoine Triplett; Reed Diamond as Daniel Whitehall; Henry Simmons as Alphonso "Mack" Mackenzie; Simon Kassianides as Sunil Bakshi; Ruth Negga as Raina; Adrianne Palicki as Bobbi Morse; Adam Kulbersh as Kenneth Turgeon; Amir Talai as Schneider; Valorie Hubbard as Aunt Cindy

Episode chronology
← Previous "Face My Enemy"	Next → "A Fractured House"
- Agents of S.H.I.E.L.D. season 2

"A Hen in the Wolf House" is the fifth episode of the second season of the American television series Agents of S.H.I.E.L.D. Based on the Marvel Comics organization S.H.I.E.L.D., it follows Phil Coulson and his team of S.H.I.E.L.D. agents as they must deal with Hydra and the mysterious "Doctor". It is set in the Marvel Cinematic Universe (MCU) and acknowledges the franchise's films. The episode was written by Brent Fletcher, and directed by Holly Dale.

Clark Gregg reprises his role as Coulson from the film series, and is joined by principal cast members Ming-Na Wen, Brett Dalton, Chloe Bennet, Iain De Caestecker, Elizabeth Henstridge, and Nick Blood. Recurring guest star Adrianne Palicki is introduced as Bobbi Morse.

"A Hen in the Wolf House" originally aired on ABC on October 21, 2014, and according to Nielsen Media Research, was watched by 4.36 million viewers in its original airing. The episode received a positive critical response, with the performances of Palicki and guest star Kyle MacLachlan praised, though the ending of the character Simmons' Hydra storyline was seen as a missed opportunity for the series.

== Plot ==
Hydra agents kill eight officers of a U.S. Navy anti-Hydra unit using a weapon reverse engineered from the victims of the Obelisk. However, the majority of the targets survive. S.H.I.E.L.D. Agent Jemma Simmons, working as a mole inside Hydra and dealing with unusual cases, is consulted about the project and states that they can only replicate the effects of the Obelisk completely if they actually have it. Simmons messages S.H.I.E.L.D. Director Phil Coulson about the matter but is photographed doing so by Raina, who Hydra leader Daniel Whitehall has given 48 hours to hand over the Obelisk. Unable to get the Obelisk, which is in the hands of "The Doctor", Raina decides to blackmail Coulson into protecting her from Whitehall by threatening to reveal Simmons to Hydra.

Meanwhile, Agent Skye is investigating the mysterious alien symbols, found on the Obelisk, which certain people have been carving in various places and objects. Grant Ward, former S.H.I.E.L.D. agent and Hydra mole, and now a prisoner of S.H.I.E.L.D., recalls that he saw them in Belarus (Note: "Eye Spy".) and that his mentor John Garrett had, before his death, (Note: "Beginning of the End".) been carving the same symbols after being injected with the alien-derived substance GH-325, which both Coulson and Skye have also been injected with. When Skye confronts Coulson about it, he confirms that he has been carving the symbols, and hypothesizes that Skye has not done the same because she may already have alien DNA inside her. Upon seeing all the carvings Coulson has made, Skye believes that they are a map.

Knowing that S.H.I.E.L.D. has infiltrated them, but unaware that it is Simmons, top-level Hydra agents Sunil Bakshi and Bobbi Morse begin investigating all agents, and Simmons frames her lab supervisor Kenneth Turgeon in order to escape suspicion. Coulson meets Raina for dinner, with Skye, Lance Hunter, and Agent Melinda May close by. Raina gives Coulson two minutes to grant her protection, but Coulson rejects her proposal, and she sends an email to all Hydra agents revealing Simmons to be a S.H.I.E.L.D. agent. Simmons is pursued by Bakshi and several armed guards, but she is saved by Morse, who is herself another S.H.I.E.L.D. mole within Hydra. The two escape with Agent Antoine Triplett in S.H.I.E.L.D.'s cloaked quinjet. Coulson wishes to use Raina to get to Whitehall, but first he convinces her to reveal the location of "The Doctor", who is in fact Skye's father. At his abandoned hideout, the agents discover the bodies of two men "The Doctor" viciously murdered. Watching via hidden camera, "The Doctor" realizes that his daughter, who he has spent decades trying to reunite with, now thinks of him as a monster.

Morse, who managed to bring some of Simmons' research with them, rejoins S.H.I.E.L.D., to the chagrin of her ex-husband, Hunter. Agent Leo Fitz, recovering from a brain injury that hinders his speech and caused him to imagine the presence of Simmons before, is reunited with the real Simmons.

In an end tag, "The Doctor" aligns himself and the Obelisk (called the Diviner in its native language) with Hydra, wishing to kill Coulson, "and everyone else".

== Production ==
=== Development ===
In October 2014, Marvel announced that the fifth episode of the season would be titled "A Hen in the Wolf House", to be written by Brent Fletcher, with Holly Dale directing.

=== Casting ===
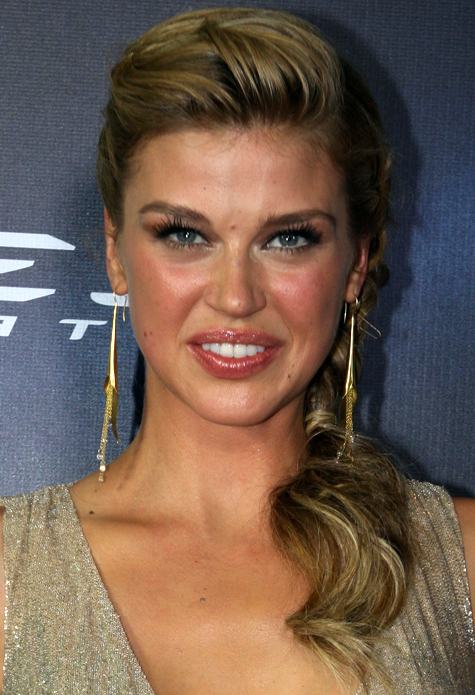
"A Hen in the Wolf house" marked the introduction of Bobbi Morse, played by Adrianne Palicki.

In October 2014, Marvel revealed that main cast members Clark Gregg, Ming-Na Wen, Brett Dalton, Chloe Bennet, Iain De Caestecker, Elizabeth Henstridge, and Nick Blood would star as Phil Coulson, Melinda May, Grant Ward, Skye, Leo Fitz, Jemma Simmons, and Lance Hunter, respectively. It was also revealed that the guest cast for the episode would include B. J. Britt as Antoine Triplett, Adrianne Palicki as Bobbi Morse, Henry Simmons as Alphonso "Mack" Mackenzie, Ruth Negga as Raina, Reed Diamond as Daniel Whitehall, Kyle MacLachlan as "The Doctor", Simon Kassianides as Sunil Bakshi, Adam Kulbersh as Kenneth Turgeon, Dale Waddington as Dr. Lingenfelter, Chase Kim as waiter, Caleb Smith as bartender, Amir Talai as Schneider, Valorie Hubbard as Aunt Cindy, Jessen Noviello as lead tac agent, Adam Dunnells as Brick, Ronnie Blevins as Deacon, Charles Fathy as head chef, and James Hutchison as tac agent guard. However, Waddington, Kim, Smith, Noviello, Dunnells, Blevins, Fathy, and Hutchison did not receive guest star credit in the episode. Britt, Simmons, Negga, Diamond, MacLachlan, Kassianides, and Kulbersh all reprise their roles from earlier in the series.

Speaking about her casting as Bobbi Morse, Palicki said "They approached me and were interested in me for the role. Of course, I'm a huge comic book fan and have been forever. My brother's a comic book writer. Playing an action hero is always exciting, but it was scary, because I was like, "I will never be able to play another Marvel character if I go forward in this role." There was a lot of questions and a lot of weighing the options. The showrunners were very convincing. I'm glad that we all came together and I got to be this character."

== Release ==
=== Broadcast ===
"A Hen in the Wolf House" was first aired in the United States on ABC on October 21, 2014. It was aired alongside the US broadcast in Canada on CTV.

=== Home media ===
The episode began streaming on Netflix on June 11, 2015, and was released along with the rest of the second season on September 18, 2015, on Blu-ray and DVD. The episode, along with the rest of the series, was removed from Netflix on February 28, 2022, and later became available on Disney+ on March 16, 2022.

== Reception ==
=== Ratings ===
In the United States the episode received a 1.6/4 percent share among adults between the ages of 18 and 49, meaning that it was seen by 1.6 percent of all households, and 4 percent of all of those watching television at the time of the broadcast. It was watched by 4.36 million viewers. The Canadian broadcast gained 2.36 million viewers, the third highest for that day, and the sixth highest for the week.

=== Critical response ===
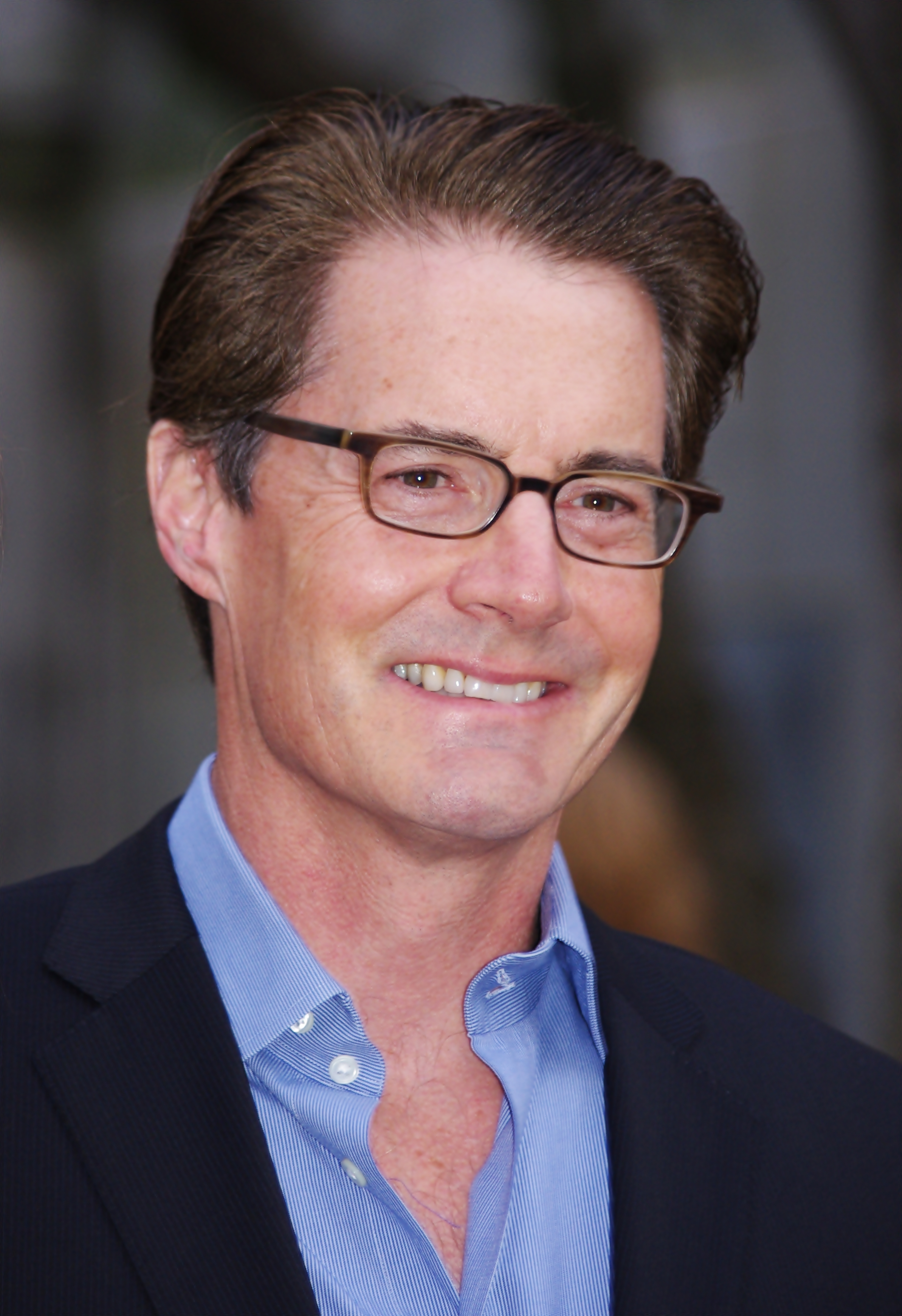
Kyle MacLachlan's performance in the episode was praised by critics.

Oliver Sava graded the episode an "A−" for The A.V. Club, praising the performances of Palicki and MacLachlan, saying, "Palicki [has] the charisma, attitude, and action chops to play a great Bobbi [while] MacLachlan nails those transitions between raging violence and understated humor." Sava was also excited about the potential for overarching storylines that developed in the episode, but felt that Simmons and Morse leaving Hydra was the "big negative" of the episode, as he felt that story was "just beginning". Eric Goldman of IGN scored the episode an 8.7 out of 10, indicating a "Great" episode, praising the introduction of Palicki as Morse, the interactions between Coulson and Skye, and the performance of MacLachlan, but finding the character of Simmons to have been handled "oddly". Jame Hunt, writing for Den of Geek, praised the introduction of Morse as "great on just about every level", and said "The plots might be getting more interesting, but what really gives me hope for the series now is that the script and character moments are also starting to work. The verbal jabs actually land in a way they didn't at all last season ... it's yet another good episode for S.H.I.E.L.D."

Alan Sepinwall gave a positive review of the episode, praising the performances of MacLachlan and Palicki, saying "[Palicki]'s convincingly badass with Mockingbird's trademark battle staves [and] MacLachlan was terrific this week." He concluded that "There was nothing tonight as cool as last week's May vs. May smackdown, but "A Hen in the Wolf House" maintained the strong forward momentum this season has had." In his positive review for Nerdist, Joseph McCabe said "This week's episode of S.H.I.E.L.D. does something that no other episode of the show has done — it kicks ass. I've found S.H.I.E.L.D. interesting, funny, entertaining – and, in its first season, exasperating – but at no point in its run has it plastered a mile-wide grin on my face that lasted long after the end credits. The fact that this grin isn't the result of one-liners or references to Marvel movies, or one specific performance or moment has me smiling again now." Kevin Fitzpatrick of ScreenCrush was less positive in his review, saying "Agents of S.H.I.E.L.D. has definitely been on a major upswing this season", but lamenting the focus on Skye and the ending of Simmons' Hydra storyline. He did, however, note the "flashy appearances" of Palicki and MacLachlan as positives for the episode.
