= StreetDance 3D =

- Official release poster
- Directed by: Max Giwa; Dania Pasquini
- Written by: Jane English
- Produced by: James Richardson
- Starring: Diversity; Flawless; George Sampson; Charlotte Rampling; Eleanor Bron; Nichola Burley; Patrick Baladi; Jocelyn Jee Esien; Richard Winsor; Jeremy Sheffield
- Cinematography: Sam McCurdy
- Edited by: Tim Murrell
- Music by: N-Dubz
- Production companies: Vertigo Films; BBC Films; UK Film Council; Protagonist Pictures; Little Gaddesden Productions
- Distributed by: Vertigo Films
- Release dates: 19 May 2010 (France); 21 May 2010 (United Kingdom)
- Running time: 98 minutes
- Country: United Kingdom
- Language: English
- Budget: £3.5 million
- Box office: £11 million

StreetDance 3D (also called StreetDance) is a 2010 British 3D dance comedy drama film directed by Max Giwa and Dania Pasquini, and written by Jane English. It was released on 21 May 2010 in RealD 3D, XpanD 3D and Dolby 3D. Britain's Got Talent stars George Sampson, Diversity and Flawless made their debut appearances to the big screen.

A production of Vertigo Films in association with BBC Films, the soundtrack features alternative acts N-Dubz, Tinie Tempah, Lightbulb Thieves and Chipmunk. A sequel, StreetDance 2, was released on 30 March 2012.

== Plot ==
In inner city London, a street dance crew "Jay-20" is on the verge of breaking up after its leader, Jay (Ukweli Roach), leaves the group unexpectedly, leaving his girlfriend Carly (Nichola Burley) in charge of the crew. The group loses the use of their usual rehearsal space. With a big street dance competition approaching the crew is forced to try and raise money or practice in other locations. Eventually they secure a space in a ballet school, on the condition that they include five ballet dancers in their routine for the competition. At first, they struggle to get along, but they all become friends in the end.

One of the teachers at the ballet school, Helena (Charlotte Rampling), takes Carly to a ballet where she starts getting ideas for their routine. When she arrives home, Carly finds Jay waiting for her and the two spend the night having sex. During a dance battle in a club the next night, the team learn that Jay has betrayed the team by joining The Surge, a rival crew. All for the sake of winning the competition. Jay brags about his sex with Carly and Tomas (Richard Winsor), a ballet dancer, punches Jay out of anger. Carly, upset over her boyfriend's betrayal, flees the club and is nearly hit by a car before Tomas pulls her out of the way. Tomas then takes Carly back to his apartment where they dance on the roof, eventually kissing. Carly then leaves him alone on the roof, while they both look at the sunrise and smile.

The next day at the school, Carly announces that they won't try to be better, they will be themselves by performing a routine that is both street and ballet. And that the new name of their dance crew is "Breaking Point". Another teacher at the school, outraged that her students are being corrupted, deliberately plans a Royal Ballet audition for the same day as the street dance finals. The ballet dancers promise Carly they will make it, but the auditions were running overtime.

In an attempt to give Breaking Point more time to wait for the ballet dancers to arrive, Carly's friend Eddie (George Sampson) goes out onto the dance floor and starts dancing, surprising the crew and wowing the audience. Jay tries to convince Carly to just give up but she states that she is sorry for him. The ballet team turn up in time, and their teacher Helena drives the Royal Ballet judges to the street dancing final so they can see the dancers perform. The routine is a success, Carly and Tomas kiss during the performance, and the crowd is enthralled. Jay is shocked that The Surge have been beaten and he's lost Carly.

The film ends with Breaking Point and The Surge dancing to N-Dubz' "We Dance On".

== Cast ==
- Nichola Burley as Carly
- Richard Winsor as Tomas
- Ukweli Roach as Jay
- Frank Harper as Fred
- George Sampson as Eddie
- Charlotte Rampling as Helena
- Eleanor Bron as Madame Fluerie
- Patrick Baladi as Mr Harding
- Teneisha Bonner as Shawna
- Lex Milczarek as Boogie
- Kofi Agyemang-Prempeh as Mac
- Hugo Cortes as Gabe
- Sianad Gregory as Chloe
- Jennifer Leung as Bex
- Rachel McDowall as Isabella
- Rhimes Lecointe as Justine
- Sacha Chang as Aimee
- Bradley Charles as Frankie
- Lil Steph as Steph
- Brooke Milliner as Brooke
- Jeremy Sheffield as Michael
- Flawless as The Surge
- Ashley Banjo as Aaron
- Diversity as Aaron's Crew
- Jordan Long as Security Guard
- Jocelyn Jee Esien as Delilah (Shawna's boss)
- Tameka Empson as Sharonda (Shawna's colleague)
- Akai Osei-Mansfield as Dancing Kid in Shopping Mall
- Leigh Alderson as a Featured Dancer
- Babbal Kumar as dark dancer
- Kyle Davey as a Featured Dancer
- Brendan Conway as an Audience Dancer

== Production ==
On 14 January 2009 it was announced that Max Giwa and Dania Pasquini would direct a 2010 British 3D dance drama movie similar to the Step Up movie series titled StreetDance 3D which would be released in cinemas in the UK, James Richardson would be the producer for the film with the budget of £3.5 million and Jane English would be the writer for the film, it was announced that Diversity, Flawless, George Sampson, Charlotte Rampling, Eleanor Bron, Nichola Burley, Patrick Baladi, Jocelyn Jee Esien, Richard Winsor and Jeremy Sheffield would star in the movie. Vertigo Films acquired distribution rights to the film. N-Dubz would compose the music for the movie. BBC Films and UK Film Council co-produced the film. StreetDance 3D filmed from August–December 2009. The film was shot with Paradise FX's Tri Delta camera systems. Max Penner (CTO of Paradise FX) was the stereographer. This film was also the launch of Paradise FX Europe. It was filmed on location, the shopping centre scene was filmed in Southside Shopping Centre and the streetdance competition was filmed in the Battersea Power Station. There is a scene featuring Akai Osei from Got to Dance which was filmed in September 2009. Charlie Bruce from So You Think You Can Dance also appears in the film, but her scenes were cut.

== Reception ==
The film received positive reviews from film critics. The review aggregator Rotten Tomatoes gives the film a 76% "fresh" rating based on 25 reviews, with an average rating of 6/10. However the film was #1 for only one week in the U.K. after making £2,273,938 in box office. The film's box-office earnings after their theatrical run was $17,695,464. It was the highest grossing UK production released in 2010, beating Robin Hood and Prince of Persia: The Sands of Time.

== Home media ==
The DVD and Blu-ray came out on 27 September in the UK which had 2 discs (one 2D and one 3D), also came with 3D glasses.

== Soundtrack ==
StreetDance (Music From & Inspired by the Original Motion Picture)

Soundtrack album by Various Artists
- Released: 10 May 2010 (Digital download); 24 May 2010 (Physical CD)
- Genres: Hip Hop; R&B; Electro
- Label: Universal Music TV
- Producer: Various Artists

Singles from StreetDance (Music From & Inspired by the Original Motion Picture)
- 1. "We Dance On" Released: 23 May 2010

1. Tinie Tempah feat. Labrinth - Pass Out
2. N-Dubz feat. Bodyrox - We Dance On
3. Lightbulb Thieves - Work It Out
4. Ironik feat. Chipmunk & Elton John - Tiny Dancer (Hold Me Closer)
5. N-Dubz - Strong Again
6. Pixie Lott - Live for the Moment
7. Aggro Santos feat. Kimberly Wyatt - Candy
8. Cheryl Cole - Fight for This Love
9. Lethal Bizzle - Going Out Tonight
10. Sugababes - Get Sexy
11. LP & JC - The Humblest Start
12. Wiley - Cash in My Pocket
13. Madcon - Beggin'
14. LP & JC feat. Skibadee, Mc Det, and Chrome & Blemish - Club Battle
15. Fatboy Slim - Champion Sound
16. Vega4 - Life Is Beautiful
17. McLean - Broken
18. Swiss feat. Music Kidz - One in a Million
19. Wiley - Wearing My Rolex
20. Clement Marfo & The Frontline – Champion

iTunes Bonus

1. Craig David - One More Lie (Standing in the Shadows) [Donae'o Mix]
2. N-Dubz - I Don't Wanna Go to Sleep
3. LP & JC - Let's Dance
4. Movie Clip 1
5. Movie Clip 2

== Sequel ==
StreetDance 2 was released in UK cinema screens, in 3D and 2D, on 30 March 2012. Early casting calls revealed the sequel to have a "Latin twist".

== Remake ==
A French remake entitled Let's Dance was released in 2019. The film was directed by Ladislas Chollat and co-written by Chollat and Joris Morio, with choreographies handled by Marion Motin. The remake flips the genders of the original film's characters, having male lead Rayane Bensetti in the 'Carly' role (renamed Joseph) and female lead Alexia Giordano in the 'Tomas' role (renamed Chloé), among other changes. Guillaume de Tonquédec, Brahim Zaibat, Florence Pernel and Line Renaud appear in supporting roles.
