= A Fractured House =

- Agents of S.H.I.E.L.D. episode
- Episode no.: Season 2 Episode 6
- Directed by: Ron Underwood
- Written by: Rafe Judkins; Lauren LeFranc
- Cinematography by: Allan Westbrook
- Editing by: Eric Litman
- Original air date: October 28, 2014
- Running time: 41 minutes

Guest appearances
- B. J. Britt as Antoine Triplett; Henry Simmons as Alphonso "Mack" Mackenzie; Adrianne Palicki as Bobbi Morse; Adrian Pasdar as Glenn Talbot; Tim DeKay as Christian Ward; Falk Hentschel as Marcus Scarlotti; Brian Tee as Toshiro Mori; Brian Van Holt as Sebastian Derik; Melanie Cruz as Noelle Walters; Michael Enright as Julien Beckers

Episode chronology
← Previous "A Hen in the Wolf House"	Next → "The Writing on the Wall"
- Agents of S.H.I.E.L.D. season 2

"A Fractured House" is the sixth episode of the second season of the American television series Agents of S.H.I.E.L.D. Based on the Marvel Comics organization S.H.I.E.L.D., it follows Phil Coulson and his team of S.H.I.E.L.D. agents as they face an anti-S.H.I.E.L.D. bill after being framed for crimes by Hydra. It is set in the Marvel Cinematic Universe (MCU) and acknowledges the franchise's films. The episode was written by Rafe Judkins and Lauren LeFranc, and directed by Ron Underwood.

Clark Gregg reprises his role as Coulson from the film series, and is joined by principal cast members Ming-Na Wen, Brett Dalton, Chloe Bennet, Iain De Caestecker, Elizabeth Henstridge, and Nick Blood. Tim DeKay guest stars as Senator Christian Ward, who previously appeared in the first season in flashbacks only. Brian Van Holt is also introduced in this episode, setting up a much more prominent role in the next episode.

"A Fractured House" originally aired on ABC on October 28, 2014, and according to Nielsen Media Research, was watched by 4.44 million viewers. The episode received a positive critical response, with the performance of guest star Adrianne Palicki praised, while her character's interactions with Lance Hunter and the moral ambiguity established between the characters of Grant and Christian Ward were also highlighted.

== Plot ==
As Glenn Talbot makes a speech to the United Nations warning of S.H.I.E.L.D., they are attacked by mercenary Marcus Scarlotti and his team, disguised as S.H.I.E.L.D. agents, whose weapons disintegrate their targets on contact. Talbot reports to Senator Christian Ward, the brother of former S.H.I.E.L.D. agent and Hydra mole Grant Ward, who wants a multinational task force targeting S.H.I.E.L.D., and would rather do it without people discovering who his brother is. S.H.I.E.L.D. agent Jemma Simmons, who was recently working as a mole within Hydra, recognizes the weapons as being the work of demolitions expert Toshiro Mori, who has a lab in Okinawa, Japan. S.H.I.E.L.D. agents Melinda May, Bobbi Morse, and Lance Hunter go to him, with Morse, also a former Hydra mole, looking to use her familiarity with Mori to get answers from him about the weapon. However, Mori is aware of Morse's true allegiances, and the team is attacked, with Mori being killed in the ensuing fight.

S.H.I.E.L.D. Director Phil Coulson, aware that Senator Ward's proposal will be devastating for the remaining S.H.I.E.L.D. agents if it comes to fruition, tells agents around the world to "go dark", including Agent Walters of the Netherlands, who he orders to a safe house in Brussels, Belgium. Coulson then visits Senator Ward himself, and convinces him to publicly give support to S.H.I.E.L.D. and decry Hydra, in exchange for Coulson handing custody of Grant over to him. Ever since Senator Ward first publicly discussed his proposal, Julien Beckers of Belgium has vehemently opposed it, and has offered sanctuary in Belgium for all S.H.I.E.L.D. agents who want it. Fearing that Beckers is Scarlotti's next target, May, Morse, and Hunter fly to Belgium. However, Beckers is actually a member of Hydra, his grandfather having created the original design for the "splinter bombs" used by Scarlotti. Scarlotti murders Agent Walters, and five other agents are killed, before the S.H.I.E.L.D. team arrives and defeats the mercenaries, with May besting Scarlotti, and the bickering ex-spouses Morse and Hunter having to work together to take down the rest. The anti-S.H.I.E.L.D. Talbot, arriving to arrest the mercenaries, offers his condolences to May for their lost comrades.

Meanwhile, Simmons is trying to treat her former close partner Agent Leo Fitz the same as she always has, but struggles due to the injuries he previously suffered at the hands of Ward. She confesses to Alphonso "Mack" Mackenzie that she left to infiltrate Hydra for Coulson when she realized that her presence was only making Fitz's condition worse. Later, Senator Ward makes a speech informing the world that his younger brother was a member of Hydra, and vowing to bring Grant to justice, while also offering public support for S.H.I.E.L.D. At the same time, Grant is being transferred to the Senator's custody, after telling Skye everything he knows about her father, "the Doctor". As he is being removed from the Playground, Simmons promises to kill him if they ever meet again. Upon being handed over to his brother's men, Ward breaks free from his restraints, takes out the guards, and escapes.

In an end tag, a man is having a design tattooed all over his body – it is the alien symbols that Coulson has been carving since being injected with the GH-325 drug.

== Production ==
=== Development ===
In October 2014, Marvel announced that the sixth episode of the season would be titled "A Fractured House", to be written by Rafe Judkins and Lauren LeFranc, with Ron Underwood directing.

=== Writing ===
Brett Dalton, in response to being asked about Ward basically being sacrificed so S.H.I.E.L.D. could be saved, said "I think he knows how this game works. He breaks down Senator Ward's whole plan, that Coulson makes this deal that wraps up right around midterms. It's the perfect political narrative to put S.H.I.E.L.D. back in the good graces of the public and to make Senator Ward the knight in shining armor. He pieces it all together. At the time when Ward breaks free, there's also some other big events that happen. As crazy as that is, there's also the world at large getting even crazier, so that means that while he is a threat ... [t]here are other things that need their attention. In a way, it makes it a more dangerous situation, but it also makes it one of several pots that are on the fire now. He's a wildcard out there." On Simmons' threat to kill Ward the next time she sees him, Dalton said "I imagine that if something is set up like that, there's always the possibility of that being fulfilled. It is such a badass thing to see one of the less aggressive agents suddenly become a force to be reckoned with in her own right. Ward believes her. She meant what she said."

=== Casting ===
In October 2014, Marvel revealed that main cast members Clark Gregg, Ming-Na Wen, Brett Dalton, Chloe Bennet, Iain De Caestecker, Elizabeth Henstridge, and Nick Blood would star as Phil Coulson, Melinda May, Grant Ward, Skye, Leo Fitz, Jemma Simmons, and Lance Hunter, respectively. It was also revealed that the guest cast for the episode would include B. J. Britt, Adrianne Palicki, Henry Simmons, Adrian Pasdar, Tim DeKay, Falk Hentschel, Joe Marinelli, Liberte Chan, Parisa Fakhri, Michael Enright, Melanie Cruz, Brian Tee, Darrel Cherney, Brian Van Holt, and Chris Wolfe. Marinelli, Chan, Fakhri, Enright, Cruz, Cherney, and Wolfe are introduced in the episode as Adamo Dioli, international reporter, Senator's aide, Julien Beckers, Agent Noelle Walters, tattoo artist, and news reporter, respectively. They all received co-starring credit in the episode.

Britt, Palicki, Simmons, and Pasdar reprise their roles from previous episodes as S.H.I.E.L.D. agents Antoine Triplett, Bobbi Morse, and Alphonso "Mack" Mackenzie, and as General Glenn Talbot, respectively. DeKay is introduced here as Senator Christian Ward, the older brother of principal character Grant Ward, who appeared as a teenager through flashbacks in "The Well", portrayed by Alex Neustaedter. Hentschel appears in the episode as Marcus Scarlotti, the original Whiplash in the comics. Another version of the character, Ivan Vanko, appeared in Iron Man 2 portrayed by Mickey Rourke. Tee, who portrays Toshiro Mori in the episode, previously portrayed the similarly named Noburo Mori in the non-MCU film The Wolverine. Van Holt's character, simply called "stranger" here, is revealed in "The Writing on the Wall" to be Sebastian Derik, a patient of Project T.A.H.I.T.I. who was injected with the GH-325 drug like Coulson. On Van Holt's casting in the episode, executive producers Jed Whedon and Maurissa Tancharoen explained that "Brian Van Holt always comes up when we discuss actors we'd love to have on the show. Clearly we're fans. We thought he'd be perfect for this role ... If this Mystery Man has any answers to the puzzle Coulson has been trying to solve, you can bet that he will try to find him."

== Release ==
=== Broadcast ===
"A Fractured House" was first aired in the United States on ABC on October 28, 2014. It was aired alongside the US broadcast in Canada on CTV.

=== Marketing ===
The first trailer for Avengers: Age of Ultron was scheduled to premiere during the airing of the episode on ABC, however, on October 22, the trailer leaked online, and within a few hours Marvel officially released it on YouTube. In response, Marvel agreed to air previously unreleased footage from Age of Ultron during the episode instead.

=== Home media ===
The episode began streaming on Netflix on June 11, 2015, and was released along with the rest of the second season on September 18, 2015, on Blu-ray and DVD. The episode, along with the rest of the series, was removed from Netflix on February 28, 2022, and later became available on Disney+ on March 16, 2022.

== Reception ==
=== Ratings ===
In the United States the episode received a 1.7/5 percent share among adults between the ages of 18 and 49, meaning that it was seen by 1.7 percent of all households, and 5 percent of all of those watching television at the time of the broadcast. It was watched by 4.44 million viewers. The Canadian broadcast gained 2.41 million viewers, the third highest for that day, and the sixth highest for the week.

=== Critical response ===
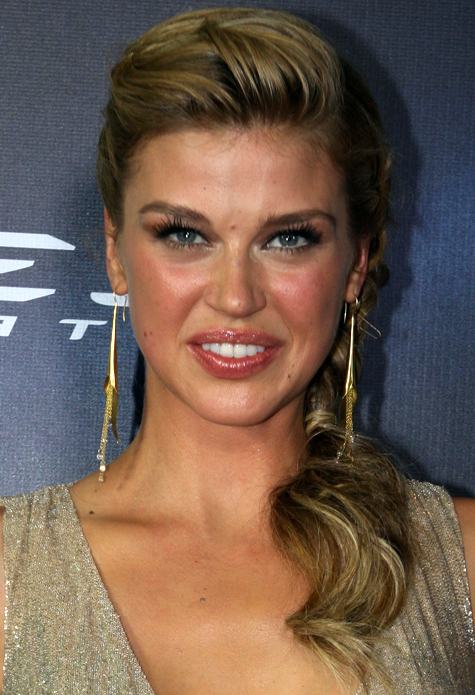
Adrianne Palicki's performance in the episode received high praise from critics.

Alan Sepinwall for HitFix noted the ever changing situations of the characters in the second season, saying "There's no complacency here the way there was last season, and now when the show is trying to be fun ... it genuinely is." He specifically praised guest casting for the episode, calling it "improved dramatically", and giving Palicki and DeKay as examples of this. He also praised the interactions of Morse and Hunter, as well as the fight choreography and photography, which he found much better than that seen in season one. Apart from the Morse, Hunter, and May storyline, Sepinwall noted that "The rest of the hour hummed along nicely" Kaitlin Thomas of TV.com called "A Fractured House" a "fun and well-balanced hour of Agents of S.H.I.E.L.D. in a line of (mostly) very solid episodes. The Mockingbird/Hunter dynamic is electric, but also light enough to counteract the emotional anchors of FitzSimmons, Ward, and Skye". She praised the guest cast for all being "on-point in terms of what they bring to the table", the ambiguity created between the Ward brothers, and the development of Coulson into a "stronger, more diligent, and more skillful leader". Oliver Sava of The A.V. Club graded the episode a "B", calling it "solid", and finding the season to be "starting to settle into a nice groove ... maintaining strong forward momentum while delivering the intrigue, action, and humor fans expect from a Marvel Studios property." He highlighted Palicki, the Morse/Hunter relationship, and the improved fight choreography as well, and was positive of the moral ambiguity established for the Ward brothers, especially for Grant, of whom he said "We don't know what [his] intentions are in the final moments of this episode, and that ambiguity makes him a much more captivating character than before."

James Hunt of Den of Geek labeled the series "now a reliably competent piece of television", praising the Morse/Hunter, FitzSimmons, and Ward brothers relationships, but being disappointed in the lack of follow-up from the ending of "A Hen in the Wolf House", saying "one would assume [that] would be top priority, even if they do get distracted from it. Instead, we saw nothing about it!" Hunt also responded negatively to the sequence where two scenes are intercut as if they occurred at the same time, when they actually didn't. He called the technique a "trick" and "cheap", and said "it's never a very satisfying reveal because it makes the audience feel stupid ... Misdirection is fine, but if everyone did it this way it'd be impossible to follow the chronology of any televisual narrative." Joseph McCabe, writing for Nerdist, praised Palicki, her character, and her character's interactions with Hunter, while also highlighting the new FitzSimmons relationship positively, and finding the intercutting scene to be "tension built on character, the kind of suspense TV was made for." Eric Goldman of IGN scored the episode an 8/10, calling it Great, and highlighting the Ward brothers especially, saying "The sequence where we cut back and forth between each [brother] swearing the other was the nefarious one was really strong, as we (and Coulson?) began to wonder if anything Ward had claimed in Season 1 was true ... Certainly, regardless of what Christian may or may not have done, Ward breaking free and killing the innocent men guarding him erases any chance of him being on the path to redemption right now, which I'm glad to see." Goldman was also positive about the development between Fitz, Simmons, and Mack, as well as the final action scene, but criticized some of the early banter as "forced and trying too hard", and felt that "Talbot's sympathetic side didn't feel earned."
