= Flawless (dance troupe) =

English street dance troupe

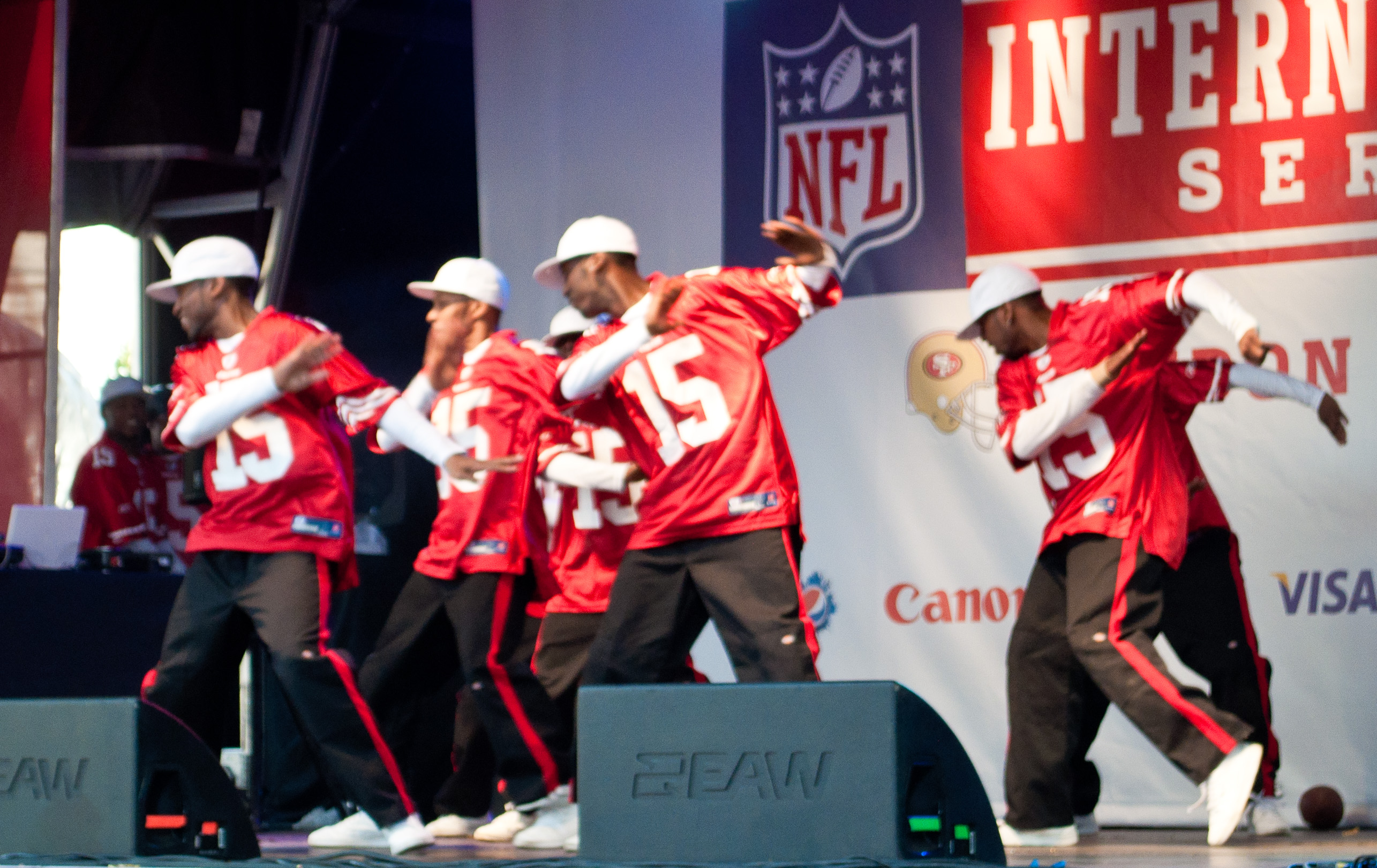

Background information
- Origin: London, England
- Genres: Street dance (popping, roboting, locking, lyrical hip hop, contemporary hip hop dance), breakdance, acrobatics
- Years active: 2005-present
- Label: Flawless Entertainment
- Members: Marlon "Swoosh" Wallen; Christian "Bounce" Alozie; Paul "Steady"Steadman; Nathan "Neo" Gordon; Allan "Boogie"Kabeja; Leroy "FX" Dos Santos; Paul "Breakz" Samuels; Nathan "Oddey" Kabongo
- Past members: Anthony "A.D." Duncan; Simon "Shock" Smith
- Website: www.flawlessofficial.com

Flawless are an English street dance troupe based in the UK who competed on the third series of Britain's Got Talent in 2009. Flawless made the final of the competition, appearing alongside fellow street dance troupe Diversity who won the show.

== History ==
Before forming Flawless, Marlon Wallen was a member of street dance group Kruel Intentions (also known as just K.I.). Kruel Intentions took part in the London Jump Off in 2004 and 2005. During the 2005 Jump Off, K.I. battled Swift Moves, the members of which would later go on to form Diversity.

Flawless went public in 2005, having been formed a year earlier by the group's choreographer Marlon Wallen and her business partner Amelia Benoit. In the same year, Flawless won the National UK Street Dancing Championships (now known as Street Dance XXL).

In 2006, they performed on the CBBC children's talent show The Slammer.

== 2009: Britain's Got Talent ==
In 2009, Flawless took part in the third series of Britain's Got Talent. They auditioned in London shortly before Diversity. Amanda Holden stated they were 'jaw droppingly outstanding', while Piers Morgan called the group 'electrifying'. They received three yeses from the judges.

In the Semi-finals(flawless), they were the last act of heat 2 to perform. They won the public vote and went straight through to the final, where they would face fellow street dance group Diversity and Susan Boyle, both of whom had gone through in the previous heat.

By the time of the final, Susan Boyle was believed to be the favorite to win. Flawless and Diversity saw each other as their main competition. Piers Morgan described it as the ultimate dance-off between the two best dance groups he had seen to that date on Britain's Got Talent.

Flawless started the final with Diversity as the second to last act. Diversity won on the night, with the voting summary later revealing that Flawless had come 8th.

== 2010–present ==
Flawless' Chase the Dream tour ran from September 2010 finishing in Bath on 14 November 2010. They then released a DVD of the tour in November 2010. The Chase the Dream rerun/extension tour ran between February and April 2011.

Flawless appeared in the 2010 film StreetDance 3D and its 2012 sequel StreetDance 2 along with Diversity and the winner of Britain's Got Talent 2008, George Sampson. Playing the rival lead role of "The Surge" who in the film are named as one of the best UK dance groups.

Flawless also appeared in 'StreetDance 3D's "The Moves" DVD. Where a number of the stars of the StreetDance 3D film including Flawless taught some of the film's most jaw-dropping dance routines by giving a simple step-by-step guide.

They appeared in the second series of Internet soap opera EastEnders: E20 in 2010.

On 4 June 2012, Flawless collaborated with Kylie Minogue at the Diamond Jubilee Concert for Elizabeth II.

Flawless took part in Peter Pan at the Milton Keynes Theatre in December 2014 to January 2015. And again in Edinburgh & Belfast in 2023.

== Filmography ==
Year	Title	Role
2006	The Slammer	Contestants
2009	Britain's Got Talent	Contestants
2010	StreetDance 3D	The Surge
2010	EastEnders: E20	Guest
2012	StreetDance 2	The Surge
2012	Strictly Come Dancing	Guest
2013	Stepping Out	House Dance Troupe
2015	The Dengineers	Guest
2016	Got What It Takes	Guest

== Tours ==
- Britain's Got Talent Tour (2009)
- Chase the Dream (2010 & 2011)
- Flash Mob where dance worlds collide (2014)

== DVDs ==
- Flawless: Live Street Dance - Access All Areas (2010)
