= Falk Hentschel =

German actor, dancer and choreographer

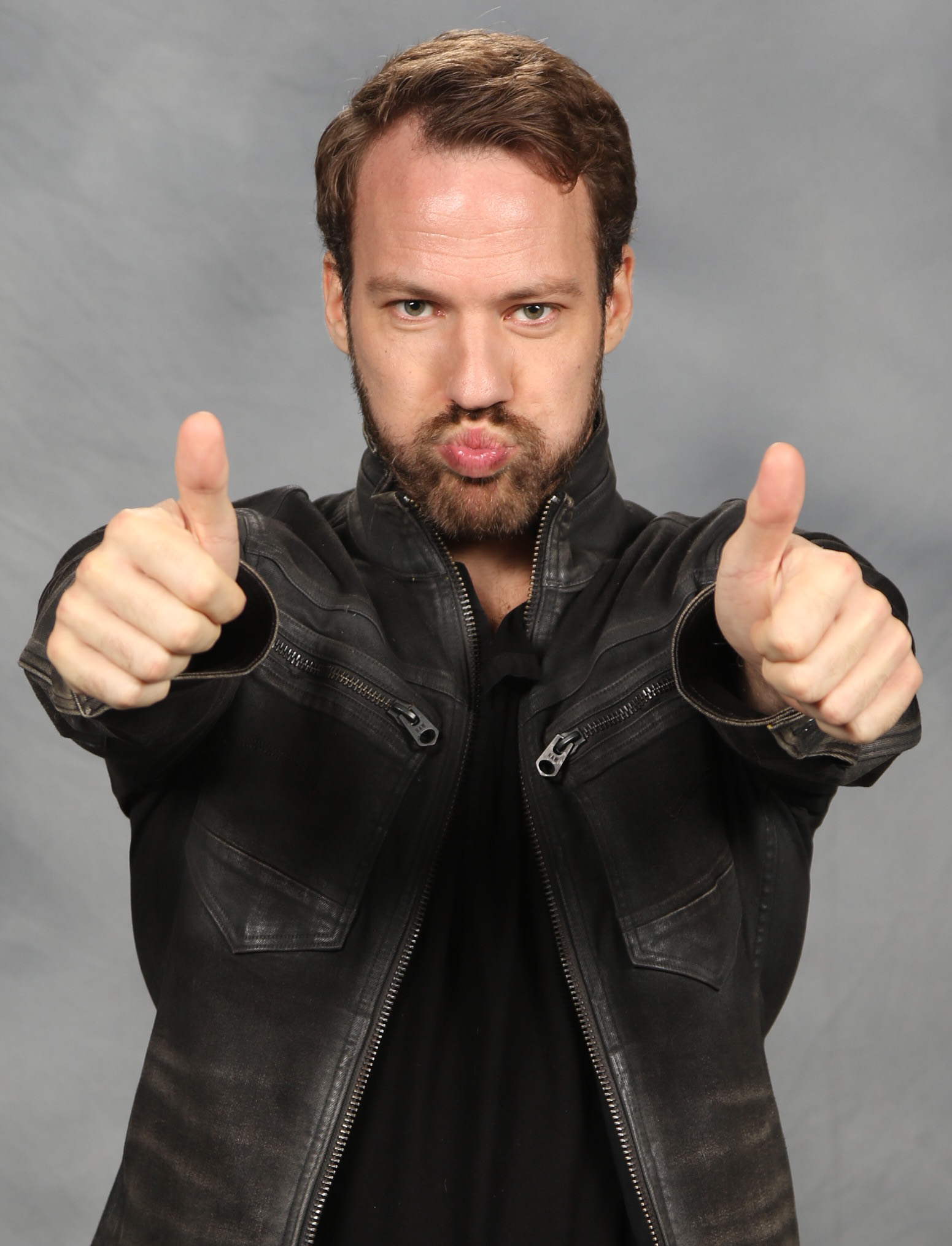
- Hentschel at Paradise City Comic Con, December 2016
- Born: 31 March 1982 (age 44); Leipzig, East Germany
- Occupations: Actor, dancer, choreographer
- Years active: 2005-present

Falk Hentschel is a German actor, dancer and choreographer. He is mostly involved in American productions and has had supporting roles in movies such as White House Down and Transcendence. He played superhero Hawkman in the Arrowverse shows The Flash, Arrow and Legends of Tomorrow.

== Early life ==
Hentschel was born in Leipzig, East Germany. With his parents, Jörg and Martina, and his brother Uwe, he escaped East Germany seven months before the Berlin Wall came down. He was raised bilingually, English and German, and moved around the world all his life.

== Career ==
Hentschel worked in London as a professional backup dancer for artists such as Mariah Carey, Britney Spears, Paulina Rubio, Jamelia and others. Later he was hired as a choreographer and worked on many music videos and tours in Canada and Asia.

In 2003, Falk decided to stay in Los Angeles for good and pursue his dream of becoming an actor. He made his acting debut in the Emmy Award-winning show Arrested Development in 2005. Small parts in Journeyman and numerous low-budget films followed.

In 2008, Hentschel decided to create his own projects and wrote the short film Who is Bobby Domino, where he met his production partner Jesse Grace. The two of them went on to write and produce more short films, of which many entered some of the most prestigious film festivals in the world and won numerous accolades.

In 2009, Hentschel worked as a go-go dancer in the piece "Untitled (Go-Go Dancing Platform)" by the artist Felix Gonzalez-Torres in the Hammer Museum in Los Angeles.

In 2009, Falk landed his first big-budget feature film role as Bernhard the assassin, co-starring next to Tom Cruise and Cameron Diaz in Knight and Day. The following year, Falk played the role of drug addict Richard Conway on TNT’s The Closer, starring Kyra Sedgwick.

In 2011, Hentschel played opposite singer Justin Bieber in the CSI: Crime Scene Investigation episode "Targets of Obsession". He also starred in the NCIS: Los Angeles episode "Archangel".

In StreetDance 2 (2012), he played a major role as Ash, the leader of a street dance crew that performed at a championship in Paris against a rival crew called Invincible.

In 2014 Hentschel guest starred in the episode "A Fractured House" of the second season of Agents of S.H.I.E.L.D. as Hydra mercenary Marcus Scarlotti.

In 2015, Hentschel portrayed the Carter Hall version of Hawkman in the 2016 show DC's Legends of Tomorrow, and also Arrow and The Flash.

== Filmography ==
Film roles
Year	Title	Role	Notes
2006	Intelligence	German Soldier #1	Short film
2006	18 Fingers of Death!	Lead Music Video Dancer	Direct-to-Video
2008	Thrill Killers	Bj	Short film
2009	Who Is Bobby Domino	Jake Sullivan	Short film
2009	The Letter		Short film
2009	Cher Papa	Phillippe	Short film
2010	Knight & Day	Bernhard	
2010	Broken	Aaron Sevell	Short film
2011	Omission	Simon Cox	Short film
2012	StreetDance 2	Ash	
2012	Lotus	Brad	Short film
2013	White House Down	Motts	
2013	Extraction	Martin	
2014	Transcendence	Bob	
2016	The Big Swim	Luca	Short film
2017	The Pick Up	Ike	Short film
2018	Welcome to Marwen	Hauptsturmführer Ludwig Topf	
2020	Ava	Gunther	

Television roles
Year	Title	Role	Notes
2005	Arrested Development	Hot Cops "Jay"	Episode: "Queen for a Day"; uncredited
2007	Journeyman	Thug #1	Episode: "Game Three"
2010	The Closer	Richard Conway	Episode: "Off the Hook"
2011	NCIS: Los Angeles	Bradford Harris Elgin	Episode: "Archangels"
2011	CSI: Crime Scene Investigation	Timothy Johnson	Episode: "Targets of Obsession"
2013	Revenge	Gregor Hoffman	Episode: "Truth, Part 1"
2014	Reckless	Arliss Fulton	Recurring
2014	Agents of S.H.I.E.L.D.	Marcus Scarlotti	Episode: "A Fractured House"
2014	The Ladies Restroom	Dan	Main cast
2015	The Flash	Carter Hall / Hawkman	Episode: "Legends of Today"
2015	Arrow	Carter Hall / Hawkman	Episode: "Legends of Yesterday"
2016, 2021	Legends of Tomorrow	Carter Hall / Hawkman	Main role (season 1), guest role (season 7)
2016	Jack the Ripper: The London Slasher	Frederick Abberline	TV movie
2018	The Alienist	Biff Ellison	2 episodes
