= George Sampson =

English street dancer

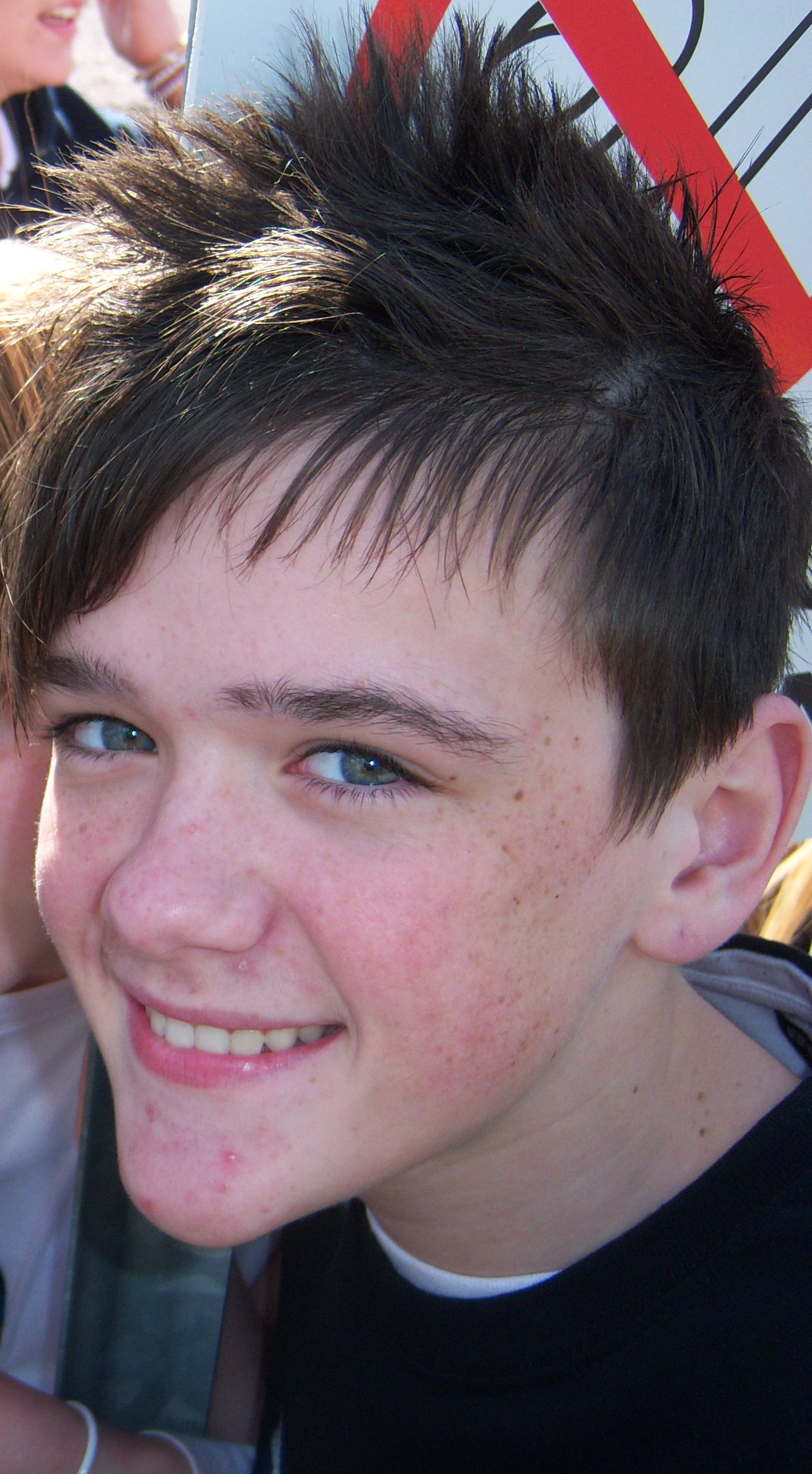
- Sampson in July 2009
- Born: 29 June 1993 (age 33); Warrington, Cheshire, England
- Occupation: Dancer • presenter • actor
- Years active: 2007–present
- Height: 5 ft 9 in (1.75 m)

George William Sampson (born 29 June 1993) is an English street dancer, television presenter, singer, and actor. He won the second series of Britain's Got Talent on 31 May 2008 at the age of 14. He is an official ambassador of the United Dance Organisation.

== Career ==
=== Britain's Got Talent ===
==== 2007 series ====
In 2007, dance teacher Dominic Chambers told Sampson that there were auditions in the area that would be right up his alley. He discovered he'd be auditioning for the first series of Britain's Got Talent only when he arrived. In his audition, he danced to "Drop" (Timbaland featuring Magoo & Fatman Scoop), receiving a yes vote from all three judges. However, despite Simon Cowell's enthusiasm, he was unable to convince the other two judges, Amanda Holden and Piers Morgan, to let Sampson proceed to the live semi-finals. This experience made Sampson determined to re-audition the following year and prove Holden and Morgan wrong. In the intervening time, he continued dancing on the streets of Manchester to improve his technique, and to raise money for his family.

==== 2008 series ====
In 2008, Sampson returned to, and successfully got through the first round of Britain's Got Talent series 2 auditions by dancing to "Rock This Party (Everybody Dance Now)". He then came top in the audience's vote in his semi-final with his arrangement of Mint Royale's big beat remix of "Singin' in the Rain", complete with an artificial rain machine on-stage, a formula that had previously been produced in a television advertisement for the Volkswagen Golf GTI. He subsequently won the audience's vote in the final, beating dance duo Signature (second place) and Andrew Johnston (third place). Sampson was due to perform a different routine for the final, to a track by the Bee Gees, which he described as involving "a lot of movement without me actually doing anything". An hour before the final started he changed his mind and, after consulting Simon Cowell, opted to re-perform his winning act from the semi-final.

The Mint Royale version of "Singin' in the Rain" went to number 1 in the UK on download sales alone in the week following Sampson's performance and Cowell's label Syco had several requests for a video.

In an interview the day after the final, George Sampson told of his return to normality the Monday after the event.

=== After Britain's Got Talent ===
On 20 July 2008, Sampson was a guest on stage at the T4 on the Beach music festival at Weston-super-Mare beach teaching presenters Steve Jones and Rick Edwards how to dance.

On 4 August 2008, Sampson made his stage debut in the West End hip-hop musical Into the Hoods. With some exceptions, he appeared in the show until it closed on 30 August. Of his new role, he said: "This year is getting better and better – Into the Hoods show is funky and young and I love the music in it – I can't wait to get dancing on that stage!" Into the Hoods played at the Novello Theatre in London and features music from popular artists such as Gorillaz, Massive Attack, Basement Jaxx and many more. Sampson appeared as one of the lost boys.

On 18 November 2008, it was announced that Cowell's record company and Bebo would work together to make an online television show called Follow My Lead, which would include some dance move tutorials by Sampson, but also a behind-the-scenes view of events and rehearsals. They previously worked together to create a similar show with Leon Jackson.

Simon Cowell initially planned to release only dance videos, but he wanted to do more. He asked the agent of Take That if he could get Sampson to sing, but it turned out he already liked to sing from a young age. His debut double a-side single entitled "Get Up on the Dance Floor/Headz Up" was released on 24 November 2008, with the proceeds going to Great Ormond Street Hospital. After an early fault that meant the single couldn't be downloaded from iTunes for two days, the single finally debuted at number 30 in the UK singles chart and remained listed for 4 weeks. The single's position in the charts gradually lowered during that time.

On 1 December 2008, his dance DVD Access 2 All Areas was released. The one-hour DVD contains a documentary about his rise to stardom, four music videos in which Sampson sings as well as dances, and a behind-the-scenes look at those videos, dance tutorials and a set of photographs.

On 23 January 2009, Sampson helped to promote the new Nokia 5800 phone in London's Regent Street. He handed over the first Nokia 5800 sold and performed a live dance routine to "Pump Up The Jam" by Technotronic which he choreographed to go with a touch-sensitive dance floor.

On 29 January, he launched the game Battle Strikers at Toy Fair 09. He also designed a plate for Blue Peter's Mission Nutrition appeal.

On 7 and 14 March, he hosted a 'Street Dance Weekend' at the Alton Towers Resort as part of their new family-themed weekends, alongside street crew Flava. Fans could attend workshops to learn one of his routines and dance alongside him.

On 28 May, Sampson was the guest star at the third Britain's Got Talent semi-final and performed before the results were announced. He also was a guest star in Britain's Got Talent: the Live Tour 2009 and he said that Nottingham was his favourite on 20 June 2009.

On 26 June 2009, Sampson became a Patron of Dance Aid organised by the UK registered charity Hope and Homes for Children.

He danced before the Rugby league match between Crusaders and Salford City Reds at Brewery Field on Saturday 11 July from around 5pm. The kick-off for the match was at 6pm. He also danced at half-time. He was also scheduled to make an appearance in Legoland Windsor on 18 July as part of "Legoland Live."

In September 2009, Sampson and Cowell reached an amicable agreement to cease their professional relationship.

Also in September, he starred in the first all-British 3D feature film StreetDance 3D (alongside dance groups Diversity and Flawless), in which he plays a character called Eddie, released May 2010.

On 16 November, Sampson was featured in the CBBC Newsround special Whose Side Are You On? as part of the BBC's anti-bullying campaign. He spoke about how he was bullied when he was younger. Other stars who appeared in the programme were Joe Calzaghe, Aston Merrygold, Patsy Palmer and Gemma Hunt.

On 5 June 2010, he appeared on Star King, a South Korean television show which features a variety of talented performers.

In January 2019, he appeared on the fourth series of Celebrity Coach Trip alongside Roxanne Pallett. In September 2019, Sampson returned to Britain's Got Talent as a contestant in Britain's Got Talent: The Champions. He participated in the 4th semi final but did not receive enough votes to progress to the final.

=== Acting career ===
On 2 February 2011, Sampson joined the cast of the BBC drama series Waterloo Road. His character, a 17-year-old student named Kyle Stack, first appeared in the second half of the sixth series in February 2011.

In 2012 he joined the cast of Mount Pleasant in its second series. He also starred in the feature film StreetDance 2 as Eddie. He has also appeared in Friday Download (series 3, episode 1). Sampson appeared in the Pantomime Peter Pan, as the lead role of Peter Pan, performed in Derby from 5 December until 6 January.

In 2013 Sampson returned to Waterloo Road as now 19-year-old Kyle Stack in episode 30. He was last seen being escorted off the school roof by teacher Simon Lowsley (Richard Mylan) when, after Kyle contemplated jumping off the school roof, long-running character Tom Clarkson (Jason Done) fell to his death trying to talk him out of it. Kyle's fate after these events was never disclosed in the show. Sampson had a minor role in a 28th-season episode of the TV series Casualty. He danced in the documentary The Nation's Favourite Dance Moment, a television film which aired in June. George also starred in a pantomime, as Jack, in Jack and the Beanstalk at The Playhouse Theatre in Weston-super-Mare.

Sampson continued his television career by acting in Season 2, Episode 5 of The Dumping Ground on CBBC in 2014. He acted again in season four of Mount Pleasant but later left the role.

He joined the cast of Emmerdale in January 2016 and made his on screen debut the following month, when he played a character named Ryan Harred who became involved in Aaron Livesy (Danny Miller)'s child sex abuse storyline. He made seven appearances, the last that July.

Sampson appeared as the character Reecey in the 2018 tour of Our House. He has played the role of Dean in Everybody's Talking About Jamie, in the UK tour, the West End, and LA productions.

He has also as of 2024 recently performed in the Easter Panto Tour of Robin Hood with Anton Benson Productions. He also has performed in 9 other pantomimes previously

== Works ==
=== Singles ===
Date of release	Title	Label	UK chart peaks
24 November 2008	Get Up on the Dance Floor/Headz Up	Syco Music	30 (UK singles chart)

=== Television ===
Programme	Role	Details	Year(s)
Britain's Got Talent	Himself	Series 1 Contestant; Series 2 Winner	2007–2008
Basils Swap Shop	Himself	Played the Dunk Beds game in Series 2	2009
Waterloo Road	Kyle Stack	Series Regular	2011–12, 2013
Mount Pleasant	Gary	Series Regular	2012–14
Friday Download	Himself	Presenter/Host	2013
Casualty	Callum Bradey	Series 28 Episode 13	2013
The Dumping Ground	Danny	Series 2 Episode 5	2014
Emmerdale	Ryan Harred	Recurring Role	2016
Celebrity Coach Trip	Himself	Contestant	2019
Britain's Got Talent: The Champions	Himself	Contestant	2019

=== Theatre ===
Year	Title	Role	Theatre	Location
2012–13	The Pantomime Adventures of Peter Pan	Peter Pan	Assembly Rooms	Derby
2013	Jack and the Beanstalk	Jack	The Playhouse Theatre	Weston-super-Mare
2017	Our House	Reecey	UK National Tour	
2019–20	Everybody's Talking About Jamie	Dean Paxton	Apollo Theatre	West End
2021–22	Everybody's Talking About Jamie	Dean Paxton	UK National Tour	
2022	Everybody's Talking About Jamie	Dean Paxton	Ahmanson Theatre	Los Angeles
2022-23	Cinderella	Prince Charming	Prince's Theatre	Clacton-on-Sea
2023	Snow White	Prince George	The Pavilion Theatre	Weymouth
2024	Robin Hood	Robin Hood	Easter Panto Tour	

=== DVDs ===
Date of release	Title	Label	UK chart peaks
1 December 2008	Access 2 All Areas	SonyBMG	1 (BBC Radio 1 Music DVD Chart)

=== Filmography ===
Year	Title	Role	Notes
2010	StreetDance 3D	Eddie	
2012	StreetDance 2	Eddie	

== Personal life ==
Sampson suffers from a condition called Scheuermann's disease, which affects developing bones in children and teenagers and can cause an abnormal curvature of the spine. "There's no way I'd ever give up dancing. Nothing would stop me," he told the paper. However, since the revelation Sampson said "It's not that bad." and claims that his doctor has said he's allowed to dance..

A fan of the game RuneScape, Sampson was invited to Jagex to record a dance emote for the game.

== Awards and prizes ==
Sampson won the under-16 category in the United Dance Organisation's 2007 World Street Dance championships. Following his win of Britain's Got Talent, he returned to the 2008 championships at the Blackpool Winter Gardens to give a performance together with his dance group A2AA (Access 2 All Areas) and to accept an award for his contributions to raising the profile of street dance from UDO chairman Simon Dibley.

In the summer of 2008 he was one of 11 celebrities to receive an honorary scout badge to celebrate the 101st birthday of the Scouting Movement.

He received an award for 'Favourite Winner' at the 2008 Nickelodeon Kids' Choice Awards where he performed his signature dance Singin' in the Rain.

Preceded by Paul Potts	Winner of Britain's Got Talent; 2008	Succeeded by Diversity
