= Champion (Clement Marfo & The Frontline song) =

Single by Clement Marfo & The Frontline
- Released: 20 July 2012
- Recorded: 2010
- Genre: Hip hop, rap rock
- Length: 2:57
- Label: Warner Music

Clement Marfo & The Frontline singles chronology
"Mayhem" (2012)	"Champion" (2012)

"Champion" is a song by the English group Clement Marfo & The Frontline. It was released as a single in the United Kingdom as a digital download on 20 July 2012. The song peaked at number 38 on the UK Singles Chart. It features on the soundtrack of the video game F1 2011 and the 2010 film StreetDance 3D, and served as the official theme song for the WWE Royal Rumble pay-per-view in 2013. The song was also used during CM Punk's 434 day reign as WWE Champion as a tribute.

== Music video ==
A music video to accompany the release of "Champion" was first released on YouTube on May 25, 2012.

== Track listing ==
Digital download
No.	Title	Length
1.	"Champion"	2:57
2.	"Champion" (Preditah Remix)	3:04
3.	"Champion" (Millions Like Us Remix)	4:02
4.	"Champion" (Carli Remix)	6:00
5.	"Champion" (Westfunk and Steve Smart Remix)	2:32

== Chart performance ==
Chart (2012)	Peak position
UK Hip Hop/R&B (OCC)	11
UK Singles (OCC)	38

== Release history ==
Region	Date	Format	Label
United Kingdom	20 July 2012	Digital download	Warner Music
