= United Dance Organisation =

Europe's largest street dance organisation

- Founded: 2002
- Founder: Simon Dibley
- Headquarters: Cardiff, Wales
- Area served: Worldwide
- Members: 85,000+
- Website: udostreetdance.com

United Dance Organisation (UDO) is a street dance organisation. It has around 85,000 members across 30 countries including Australia, the UAE, Germany, Japan, USA, Thailand, New Zealand, Belgium, the Netherlands, and some in Africa. It was founded in 2002 by Simon Dibley (CEO).

UDO hosts 22 regional events annually, as well as Six Nations, British Championships, European Championships and World Championships.

They are based in Cardiff, Wales.

== UDO Academy ==
UDO Academy forms part of the UDO Group, an educational and training platform for dancers wishing to gain accreditation in various street dance styles. In 2013, UDO Academy launched the UDO Street Dance Syllabus which is designed to enable dancers to gain accreditation from the Intro 1 and 2 grades through to a teacher level. It introduces the foundations in all styles of street dance.

There are now well over 500 schools in the UK now using it as well as schools in Canada, Greece, Malta, Cyprus and Thailand.

== Encore ==
The Encore brand that forms part of the UDO Group also offer events in Jazz, ballet, Tap, Contemporary and Musical Theatre and plays host to events in the UK and Dubai.

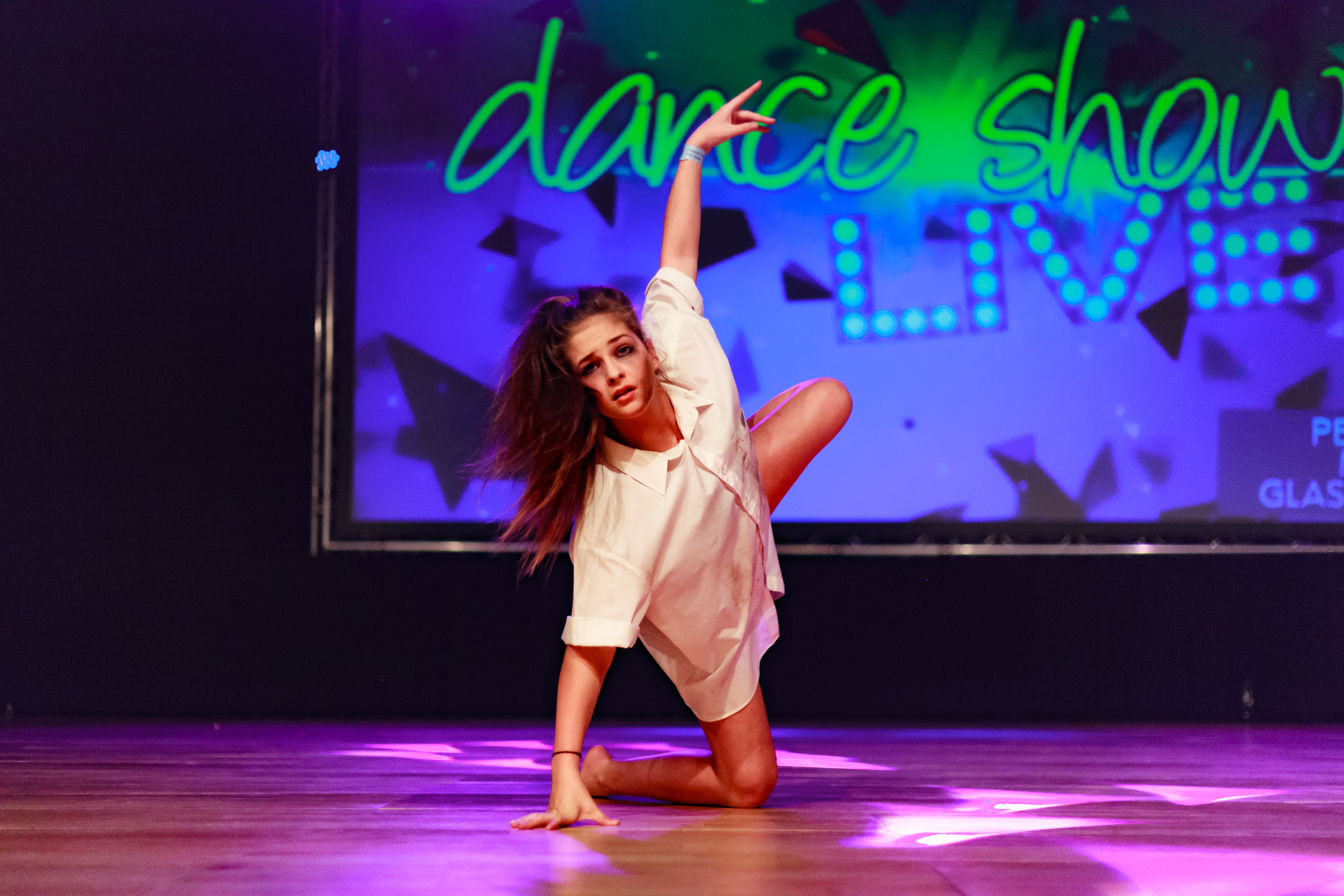
A performer at Dance Show LIVE

Encore Weekend is a dance weekend held in the UK, representing all dance styles.

== Dance Show LIVE ==
Dance Show LIVE is Scotland's biggest dance exhibition. This event is held in Glasgow's world famous SECC Arena.

== UDOIT! Dance Foundation ==
UDO's partner, UDOIT! Foundation, is a charitable organisation providing opportunities for the UK's aspiring, underprivileged and disabled dancers.

Since 2014, UDOIT! Dance Foundation has played host to the National Dance Championships. The event has industry professional judges and workshops with these judges throughout the day in various styles.

== UDO Ambassadors ==
UDO ambassadors have previously included Turbo (Got To Dance), Ashley Banjo (Diversity), Mitchell Craske (Diversity), Perri Kiely (Diversity), Jordan Banjo (Diversity), Sisco Gomez and George Sampson (Britain's Got Talent).

== International partners ==
The UDO have international partners in;

- Australia
- Belgium
- Botswana
- Cyprus
- Denmark
- Germany
- Ghana
- Hungary
- Japan
- Luxembourg
- Netherlands
- New Zealand
- South Africa
- Tanzania (UDO East Africa)
- Thailand
