= StreetDance 2 =

- Official release poster
- Directed by: Max Giwa; Dania Pasquini
- Written by: Jane English
- Produced by: James Richardson; Allan Niblo
- Starring: Falk Hentschel; Sofia Boutella; Flawless; George Sampson
- Cinematography: Sam McCurdy
- Edited by: Tim Murrell
- Production companies: Vertigo Films; BBC Films; BFI
- Distributed by: Vertigo Films
- Release date: 30 March 2012 (United Kingdom)
- Running time: 90 minutes
- Country: United Kingdom
- Language: English
- Budget: £7 million
- Box office: $20.8 million

StreetDance 2 is a 2012 3D British dance drama film and the sequel to StreetDance 3D (2010). The film has been released in RealD 3D, XpanD 3D and Dolby 3D with Max Giwa and Dania Pasquini returning to direct. Britain's Got Talent stars George Sampson and Flawless return along with hip-hop dancer Sofia Boutella (backing dancer for Madonna and face of Nike) and Falk Hentschel. The cast also features b-boys such as Lilou, Niek and Yaman. The film is a production of Vertigo Films in association with BBC Films.

== Plot ==
To beat the world's best dance crew at a dance-off in Paris, France, German streetdancer Ash (Falk Hentschel) and new friend and manager Eddie (George Sampson), gather the greatest streetdancers from around Europe, whilst hoping to add a Latin element courtesy of salsa dancer Eva (Sofia Boutella). After a rough start, the group all agree to incorporate this element and have fun adding Latin to street dance; whilst doing this, Ash and Eva grow closer. Two days before the big dance-off, Ash rejects Eva on the dance floor and refers to their fusion dance as a "Little Latin Experiment" when they're up against "The Surge" (Flawless) in a friendly dance-off. The police come and break up the dance-off and Eva runs away. Ash chases her but she doesn't want to know. The next day Ash goes to apologise to Eva but meets her Uncle (Tom Conti) who tells Ash to leave. Ash comes back to explain when he finds Eva's Uncle on the floor. He is rushed to the hospital where Eva meets him and Ash. When Eva's Uncle wakes up, he tells Ash that he should go to the dance-off. Ash and his crew leave for the dance-off and are frustrated to find the gates locked. Ash gets them in wearing popcorn sellers' clothes. They battle Invincible until the last dance where they need Eva. She appears and does the dance as planned. Ash and his crew finish, and are ecstatic to find they have won. Invincible's leader then hands the trophy to Ash. As everyone celebrates, Ash and Eva share a kiss.

== Cast ==
- Falk Hentschel as Ash, the protagonist
- Sofia Boutella as Eva, Salsa/Latin dancer and romantic interest
- George Sampson as Eddie, Ash's manager
- Stephanie Nguyen "Lil Steph" as Steph, part of Ash's crew
- Delphine Nguyen "Deydey" as Yo-Yo, part of Ash's crew
- Niek Traa as Legend, part of Ash's crew
- Elisabetta Di Carlo "Betty Style" as Bam-Bam, part of Ash's crew
- Samuel Revell "BBoy Sambo" as Tino, part of Ash's crew
- Kaito Masai "Kite" as Terrabyte, part of Ash's crew
- Ali Ramdani "Lilou" as Ali, part of Ash's crew
- Ndedi Ma-Sellu "Dedson" as Killa, part of Ash's crew
- Brice Larrieu as Skorpion, part of Ash's crew
- Akai Osei as Junior, the youngest of Ash's crew who was 11
- Maykel Fonts as Lucien, Eva's dance partner
- Tom Conti as Manu, Eva's uncle
- Babbal Kumar as dark dancer
- Anwar Burton as Vince, the antagonist, leader of Invincible
- Flawless as dance crew "The Surge"
- Pablo Baez as Boxing Ring / Latin Party Couple 2

== Release ==
The film was theatrically released on 30 March 2012 by Vertigo Films and was released on DVD and Blu-ray on 24 July 2012 by Entertainment One.

== Reception ==
The film received generally mixed reviews. Rotten Tomatoes reported that 46% (Rotten) of critics gave this film positive reviews. The website's consensus reads: "StreetDance 2 suffers from a deficiency of electric boogaloo."

StreetDance 2 received its first review on 10 February 2012 with Screen International chief film critic, Mark Adams, describing the dancing as "toe-tappingly cool" and stating that lead actress Sofia Boutella is "destined to be a big star".

Box office results for the opening weekend (from Friday 30 March 2012) for Street Dance 2 showed the movie grossed £608,024 and placed fifth in the UK movie box office charts, a result that only managed a quarter of the success Streetdance 3D did, placing it behind The Hunger Games which remained the top-grossing movie for two weeks.

The film caused significant outrage among Algerians living in both France and Algeria due to their compatriot Sofia Boutella's appearance in scenes that are excessively risqué by Algerian standards. Viewing the film as an "insult to Algerian traditions and ethics," some Algerian immigrants in France boycotted the film and a campaign was launched through social networking sites Twitter and Facebook to prevent the showing of the film in Algeria.

== Soundtrack ==
1. We Will Rock You [LP & JC remix] – Queen
2. Go in Go Hard Ft Wretch 32 – Angel
3. Domino – Jessie J
4. High & Low – Sunday Girl
5. Rockstar – Dappy
6. Who Says You Can't Have It All – Dionne Bromfield
7. Invincible – Anwar 'Fliistylz' Burton
8. Rack City – Tyga
9. Bow Wow Wow Ft Chipmunk – Bodyrox
10. Superbass – Nicki Minaj
11. Mama Do the Hump – Rizzle Kicks
12. The Motto Ft Lil Wayne – Drake
13. Troublemaker – Taio Cruz
14. Bright Lights Ft Pixie Lott – Tinchy Stryder
15. Burning Benches – Morning Runner
16. Unorthodox Ft Example – Wretch 32
17. Apache – Incredible Bongo Band
18. Midnight Caller – Chase & Status
19. Bass Down Low Static Revenger Remix – Dev
20. Together – Herve
21. Hold On – Skepta
22. Baudelaires Tango – Lloyd Perrin & Jordan Crisp
23. Catacombs Remix – Lloyd Perrin & Jordan Crisp
24. Cuba 2012 Dj Rebel Streetdance 2 Remix – Latin Formation
25. Agua Remix – Los Van Van
26. Ride My Beat – Polluted Mindz
