= Clement Marfo & The Frontline =

English music group

- Origin: London, England
- Genres: Rap rock; hip hop; alternative rock; soul; grime
- Years active: 2007–2013
- Label: Warner Music Group
- Members: Clement Marfo; Kojo Vihram; Dan Turnbull; Rich Sinclair; Stacey Mansell; Jonny Douch; Dion Payne
- Website: www.clementmarfo.com

Clement Marfo & The Frontline were an English music group formed in South London. The group's members are diverse in many genres of music. Their sound is built on grime and hip-hop, with elements of rock brought in by the various members of the band.

== History ==
The band was founded by Clement Marfo. Marfo, who was educated at Wimbledon College and served as Deputy Head Boy there, started his career as a hip-hop artist, but soon wanted to have a live band to work with and to dabble in the rock scene. Dion, whom Clement met through a mutual friend, introduced Marfo to Richard Sinclair, Daniel Turnbull, Stacey Mansell, and Jonny Douch. Previously, Marfo had found vocalist Kojo Vihram on Myspace and wanted to work with him too, leading to the formation of The Frontline. Although he has been shown to rap, Dion became the band's drummer.

The group have worked with producer Iain James, known for working with Professor Green and Wretch 32. They have supported the likes of Plan B, Rizzle Kicks, and De La Soul. The group were named a nominee on MTV's Brand New for 2012, and were tipped as T4's Rising Stars of 2012.

Their song "Champion" was used as one of the unofficial songs to support the London 2012 Olympics. It was also used as the official theme song of the WWE Royal Rumble pay-per-view in 2013, specifically in the buildup for the main event match between CM Punk and The Rock, and on the soundtrack of the video game F1 2011. Their song was featured on the soundtrack of the video game by EA Sports, FIFA 13 with "Us Against the World".

The group has collaborated with artists such as Ghetts on "Overtime", Kano on "Mayhem", and Sway on "It's My Time". After announcing a series of solo shows throughout May and June, it was reported that Marfo is taking a break from The Frontline.

== Members ==
- Clement Marfo – frontman, rapper, co-founder
- Kojo Vihram – vocals
- Richard Sinclair – guitar, keyboards
- Daniel Turnbull – guitar
- Stacey Mansell – keyboards, vocals
- Jonny Douch – bass, vocals
- Dion Payne – drums

== Discography ==
=== Singles ===
Year	Single	Peak chart positions		Album
Year	Single	UK	UK R&B	Album
2011	"Overtime"	–	—	Non-album singles
2012	"Mayhem"	96	25	Non-album singles
2012	"Champion"	38	11	Non-album singles

== Awards ==
Year	Award	Category	Result
2012	Urban Music Awards	Best Group	Won
