= Simon Kassianides =

British actor and producer

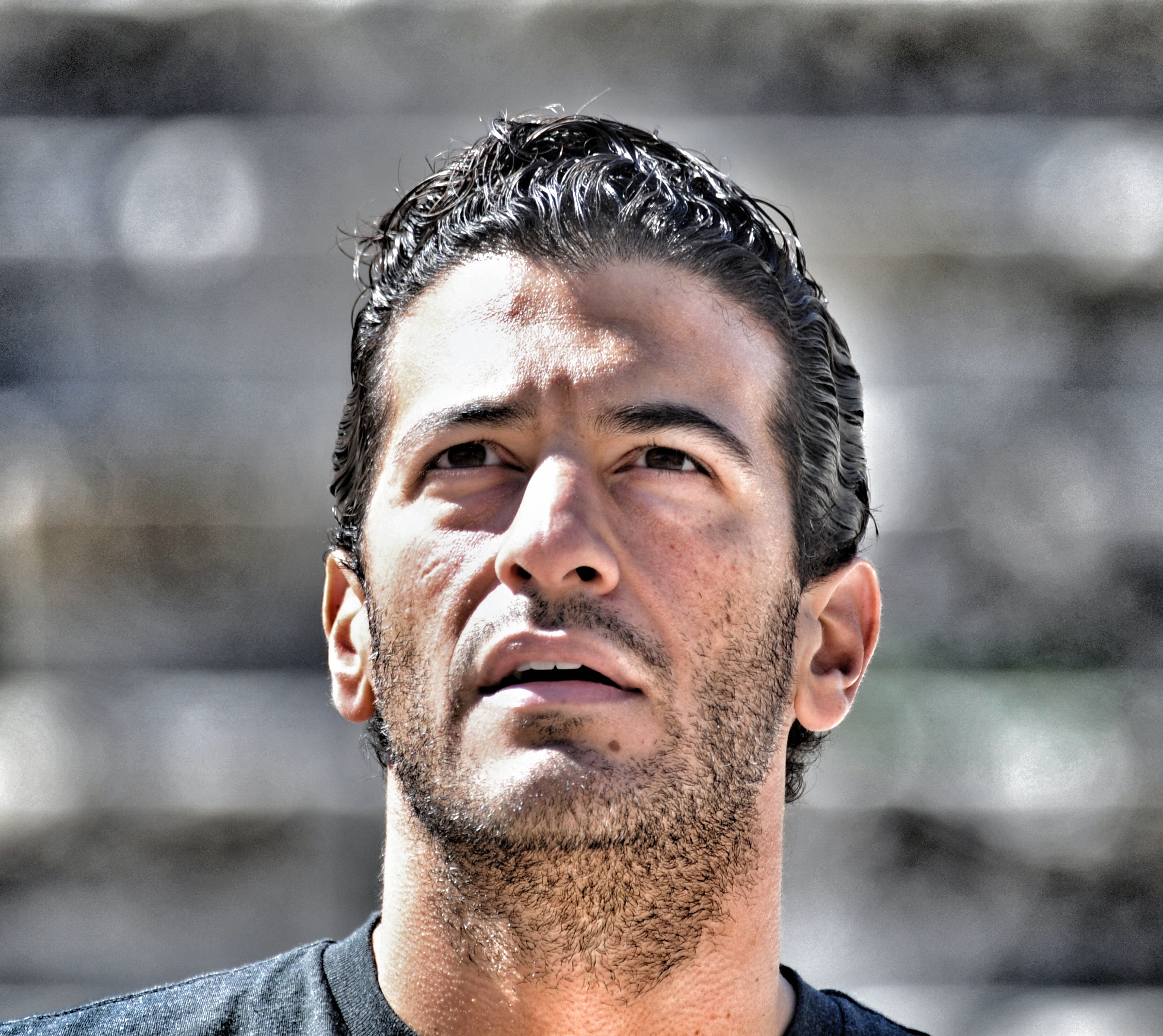
- Kassianides in 2012
- Born: Simon Mario Kassianides; London, England
- Occupation: Actor
- Years active: 2004–present

Simon Mario Kassianides is an English actor, film director, producer and screenwriter.

== Early life ==
Kassianides was born in London, of Greek Cypriot origin, the son of Helen and Mario Kassianides, both business owners. Kassianides has an older brother, Photis Kassianides, who works in finance.

Kassianides was brought up in Clapham and educated at Dulwich College. At the University of Edinburgh he was the producer and executive producer of a sold out run of Grease at the George Square theatre. Profits were donated to the Macmillan Cancer Support.

== Career ==
In 2002, soon after Kassianides graduated with honours in International Business with Finance and while in London helping his mother open Urban Coffee, a fair trade and organic coffee shop in Tooting Broadway, he was spotted by BAFTA award-winning producer Piers Vellacott.

Kassianides started a course at London's Central School of Speech and Drama but had to leave after being offered a role in the Tennessee Williams' play Night of the Iguana. His performance as Pedro was acclaimed by critics.

Soon after, Kassianides was noted as an actor to watch in a BBC documentary called Making it at Holby.

Since then, Kassianides has appeared in a number of television episodes in the USA and UK, including Casualty, My Life in Film, Plane Spotting, Ultimate Force, Spooks, Recovery, Holby Blue, Suburban Shootout, The Kylie Show, Ashes to Ashes, The Passion, The Fixer, Love Soup, Hustle, Law and Order UK, Nikita, Burn Notice, and Agents of S.H.I.E.L.D.

Kassianides has also appeared in several international films such as The Edge of Love, Wuthering Heights, Between Two Fires, Quantum of Solace and Smooch.

In 2010, Kassianides produced, directed and starred in Geezas, a film he completed in record time and within budget. The film made the official selection of the 2012 Hollywood Film Festival, selling out The Arclight Movie Theatre in Hollywood at its premiere. In 2012, Simon Kassianides was nominated as a Discovery Director to watch at the Hollywood Film Festival for Geezas, which won "Best Actor" and "Best Supporting Actress" at the 2013 British Independent Film Festival. Kassianides directed first time actors who won against the likes of Martin Freeman (The Hobbit) and Anne-Marie Duff (Nowhere Boy).

His work rate and ethic was spotted by the administrators of the Michael Cacoyannis Foundation—created by Michael Cacoyannis, director of Zorba the Greek, to help and promote Greek artists—and was appointed a Global Consultant and Representative of the Foundation in 2012.

== Filmography ==
Year	Title	Role	Notes
2004	Casualty	Steve Lyon	
2005	Ultimate Force	Juan	
2006	Spooks	Mourad	
2007	Holby Blue	Nico Osman	
2008	The Fixer	Saban Zira	
2008	The Edge of Love	Partisan	
2008	Quantum of Solace	Yusef Kabira	
2009	Hustle	Tracer	
2010	Between Two Fires	Ali	
2011	Smooch	Percy / Flynn	
2011, 2013	Nikita	Ramon	
2011	Geezas	Eddie	
2012	Burn Notice	George Anders	
2013	Desert Dancer	Sattar	
2014	How to Train Your Dragon 2	No-Name	Voice
2014–2015, 2017	Agents of S.H.I.E.L.D.	Sunil Bakshi	
2015	Zoo	Jean-Michel Lion	
2015	Metal Gear Solid V: The Phantom Pain	Soldiers / Extras	
2017	Unforgettable	Michael Vargas	
2017	Criminal Minds: Beyond Borders	Jeffrey Khan	
2018	Assassin's Creed Odyssey	Stentor	Also voices Hades in the DLC
2019	Cliffs of Freedom	Gregory	
2019	Pearson	Nick D'Amato	Main Cast
2019	Red Shoes and the Seven Dwarfs	Arthur	Voice
2020, 2023	The Mandalorian	Axe Woves	4 episodes
2025	Blood of Zeus	Orpheus	Voice; 2 episodes
