= B. J. Britt =

American actor (born 1982)

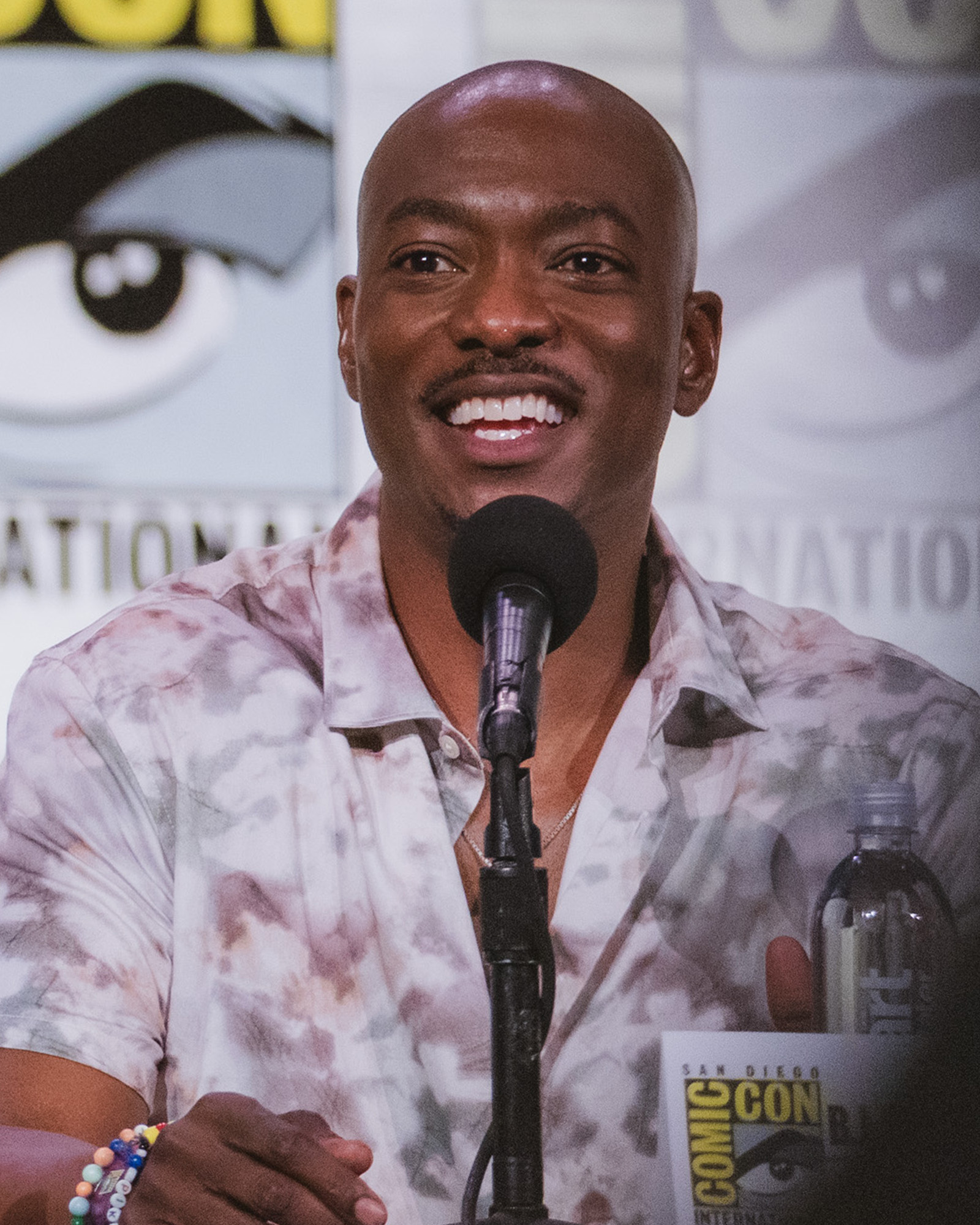
- Britt in 2025
- Born: April 20, 1982 (age 44); Wilson, North Carolina
- Occupation: Actor
- Years active: 2003–present

B. J. Britt (born April 20, 1982) is an American actor best known for his role as Antoine "Trip" Triplett on Agents of S.H.I.E.L.D., set within the Marvel Cinematic Universe. He is also known for his roles as Paul Patterson Jr. on Being Mary Jane, Darius Beck on Unreal and Will Baker on Pitch.

== Early life ==
Britt was born in Wilson, North Carolina.

== Career ==
Britt made his television debut in 2003 appearing in the recurring role of Devon Fox in One Tree Hill. Subsequently, he appeared in TV shows such as Veronica Mars, CSI: Miami, Cold Case and The Vampire Diaries. He has also acted in movies such as the Victor Salva film Peaceful Warrior and in the Twilight parody film Vampires Suck.

In 2013, he joined the main cast of BET series Being Mary Jane as Paul Patterson Jr., the responsible younger brother of the lead character Pauletta ("Mary Jane Paul") Patterson. The series pilot episode aired on July 2, 2013. The pilot re-aired on November 3, 2013, and the series officially premiered on January 7, 2014. The series ended on April 23, 2019, with a two-hour film finale.

In 2014, he was cast as Agent Antoine Triplett in the ABC series Agents of S.H.I.E.L.D. The character was supposed to die in season 1, but was kept through the first half of season 2 where he was killed off. He briefly returned in season 4 as a virtual artificial intelligence version of the character when the show's lead cast is sent into a "what if" type of world known as the Framework.

In 2016, he joined the main cast of the second season of Unreal, while he also plays the recurring role of Will Baker in Pitch within the same year.

== Filmography ==
=== Film ===
Film roles
Year	Title	Role	Notes
2006	Peaceful Warrior	Kyle	
2006	Heavens Fall	Haywood Patterson	
2009	The Tell-Tale Heart	Rookie Cop	Short
2009	Sutures	Scott	
2010	Stacy's Mom	Randall	
2010	Vampires Suck	Antoine	
2010	Transfer	Apolain / Hermann	
2011	Fanboy	Ice Cream Vendor	
2012	Should've Been Romeo	T.J.	
2014	10 Things I Hate About Life	Nick	Unreleased
2018	Sabaash Naidu	Uber Driver	Unreleased

=== Television ===
Year	Title	Role	Notes
2003, 2009	One Tree Hill	Devon Fox	5 episodes
2006	Veronica Mars	Rashard Rucker	Episode: "Rashard and Wallace Go to White Castle"
2006	One on One	Calvin	3 episodes
2006	That's So Raven	Dylan	Episode: "Members Only"
2007	Lincoln Heights	Verne Harwyn	3 episodes
2008	CSI: Miami	Jared Bell	Episode: "To Kill a Predator"
2008	Cold Case	Tom 'The Breeze' Bernard '73	Episode: "Glory Days"
2008	Everybody Hates Chris	Walter Dickerson	4 episodes
2009	Three Rivers	Antoine	Episode: "Place of Life"
2010	Three Rivers	Anton Weathers	Episode: "Win–loss"
2010	The Vampire Diaries	Carter	Episode: "Brave New World"
2010	Bones	Clinton	Episode: "The Maggots in the Meathead"
2011	Nikita	Justin Merrick	Episode: "Game Change"
2011	Prime Suspect	Robber	2 episodes
2011	Wonder Woman	Willis Parks	Unsold TV Pilot
2012	Grimm	Bryan	Episode: "Last Grimm Standing"
2012	Sons of Anarchy	Darnell	2 episodes
2013	Beverly Hills Cop	Dante	Unsold TV Pilot
2013	Raising Hope	Bobby Bowman	Episode: "Adoption"
2013–2019	Being Mary Jane	Paul Patterson Jr.	Main cast
2014, 2017	Agents of S.H.I.E.L.D.	Antoine Triplett	Recurring (seasons 1–2, 4)
2015	Welcome to the Family	Quinton	TV movie
2016	Unreal	Darius Beck	Main cast (season 2)
2016	Pitch	Will Baker	Recurring
2017	Behind Enemy Lines	Reggie Mitchella	Unsold TV Pilot
2018	The Passage	Peter	Character written out of show
2019	Magnum P.I.	Sam	Episode: "Knights Last Forever"
2019	Rediscovering Christmas	Adam	TV movie
2020	A Million Little Things	Issac Martin	2 episodes
2022	The Holiday Stocking	R.J.	TV movie
2024	The Groomsmen: First Look	Pete	TV movie trilogy
2024	The Groomsmen: Second Chances	Pete	TV movie trilogy
2024	The Groomsmen: Last Dance	Pete	TV movie trilogy
2025	Tidings for the Season	Adam Kade	TV movie
