= Crayon Shin-chan: Fast Asleep! The Great Assault on Dreamy World! =

- Shinchan movie
- Directed by: Wataru Takahashi
- Screenplay by: Hitori Gekidan; Wataru Takahashi
- Based on: Crayon Shin-chan by Yoshito Usui
- Starring: Akiko Yajima; Miki Narahashi; Keiji Fujiwara; Satomi Korogi; Mari Mashiba; Tamao Hayashi; Teiyū Ichiryūsai; Chie Sato; Haruhi Nanao
- Production company: Shin-Ei Animation
- Distributed by: Toho
- Release date: April 16, 2016 (Japan)
- Running time: 96 minutes
- Country: Japan
- Language: Japanese
- Box office: US$20.6 million ¥2.11 billion

Crayon Shin-chan: Fast Asleep! The Great Assault on Dreamy World! (クレヨンしんちゃん 爆睡!ユメミーワールド大突撃, Kureyon shinchan: Bakusui! Yumemi-Wārudo Daitotsugeki!) is a 2016 Japanese anime comedy film produced by Shin-Ei Animation. It is the 24th film of the popular comedy manga and anime series Crayon Shin-chan. It is directed by Wataru Takahashi, who also directed the 22nd movie Serious Battle! Robot Dad Strikes Back. The script of the film is written by comedian Hitori Gekidan along with Wataru Takahashi.

== Plot ==
One night, the Nohara family were enjoying a pleasant dream, when suddenly a big fish appeared in their dreams and ate them. The next morning, Hiroshi read in the newspaper that everybody in another town had the same nightmare as him, but it seemed to have ended. But Hiroshi also heard the same dream from Misae, Shinnosuke, Himawari and even Shiro. They were surprised and thought if the same thing is happening in Kasukabe too. In kindergarten, on telling others about his nightmare, Shinnosuke was surprised to learn that everyone else had the same dream.
Then a mysterious girl named Saki was transferred to Futaba Kindergarten and joined Shinnosuke's class. Everyone in the class, including the rather inactive Bo-chan, were all excited and happy on seeing her. But Saki had a cold attitude and didn't get along well.
That night, Shinnosuke and others were taken to a fantasy dreaming world (called Yumemi-World). Shinnosuke could see all the Kasukabe Defense Group members. They were riding on big balls. Whatever they wished was granted. When Masao said that he wanted to be a manga-artist, the ball grew bigger and he was transformed into a manga artist. Kazama was a TV announcer and Nene was an actress and a singer. Shinnosuke wished for chocobi and sweets which were instantly granted. Then he wished to play with young attractive girls in swimsuits and was taken to a beach-like area where he could do all sorts of enjoyment.
While the kids had good dreams, Hiroshi, Misae and other adults too had nice dreams, but their dream was soon converted into nightmares. The dreaming power of children is big while that of adults is small. Adults were losing dreaming energy faster than the children. When the dreaming power of children was consumed, they too started having nightmares. The kids became disheartened and depressed when their dreams couldn't be fulfilled completely. Masao on losing all his manga started crying.
The next day, the Kasukabe Defense Group held a meeting and decided to solve this problem of nightmares. Meanwhile, they were gradually befriending Saki. Then they asked Saki to join their group, to which she agreed. While Kazama was worrying about the cause of such nightmares, he came to realise that while everyone was having the same dream, Saki was not present. He also recalled that their dreams were being sucked and converted into nightmares. Kazama gradually started to suspect that Saki and her family are the ones who are sucking up their good dreams.
Kazama went to Saki and questioned her about this. Shinnosuke told not to accuse Saki. But Saki finally decided to reveal the truth.
Saki had lost her mother in an accident when she was small. Suffering from survivor guilt over her mother's death, Saki started having nightmares of her mother is having a grudge against her. Saki's father, Nubatama Yumehiko a scientist, was worried about Saki's PTSD and created a psychological magical world called the Yumemi-world. To protect her from having nightmares, he absorbed all the good dreams from others and poured it into Saki's dream world so that she could have happy dreams. As a result, others' dream energy was sucked and they all started having nightmares.
Despite knowing all this, Saki said that she didn't want to upset her father and so she neither said anything to him or others.
In the Yumemi-world, Saki always had a stuffed toy baku which ate all her nightmares. In Japanese mythology, baku is a spirit of a tapir that devours dreams and nightmares. Shinnosuke said that Baku must be existing somewhere and decided to find it together, but could not see it anywhere.
Meanwhile, Saki's father learned of this and worrying about Saki, he interfered in their plan. Hiroshi and Misae also learned of their plan. They said that children are pure in heart and adults shouldn't play with their feelings. They along with other adults decided to help the kids. In the dream, a grey old female monster resembling Saki's mother appeared suddenly and swallowed Saki, blaming her for her death. Just then, the Yumemi-world broke and everybody woke up. But Saki was still in her trapped in her dreams. So Shinnnosuke and the kids again slept, this time forming a circle around Saki and went into her dream.
In Saki's dream, the monster was powerful. They fought with the monster. Shinnosuke transformed to a tapir, Nene to a crab, Kazama to an aeroplane, Bo-chan to rock and Masao used a pen as a sword, but they couldn't win. Shinnosuke being a tapir ate Saki's nightmare, but the nightmare was born again. Just then, little Saki, around the age when her mother had died, appeared and said to Saki, "Mom died because of you. She won't forgive you. You can't escape from nightmares."
Seeing the children sleeping in torment, Misae couldn't resist and decided to go into their dream. Misae said that "There is no such parent who doesn't care about their children. It is the duty of every parent to protect their children during trouble. For a parent, children are more important than themselves. Even if a mother hates her child for some reason, still the child is much precious than her own self." Misae being a mother herself fought the monster bravely and can defeat it.
Misae then embraced Saki explaining that parents never have a grudge against their children. She apologized for making her face sad and told that she is her dream and her smile is their power. Saki was able to accept her mother's death and was able to destroy the nightmare.
Then little Saki appeared again and asked if she was going to disappear. Saki said that since she was fine, little Saki can be inside her. So they two get unified into one. Seeing the nightmare getting disappeared, Kazama asked whether it was all over. Saki replied that it was still left but she is going to live better than before.
To prevent others from getting further nightmares, Saki's father along with Saki moved to overseas. Everybody resumed their normal lifestyles. Later Shinnosuke and others received an overseas letter from Saki saying that she wants to meet them in her dreams. In the Kasukabe Defense Group meeting, they decided to meet Saki in their dream world and slept together that night in excitement.

== Cast ==
- Akiko Yajima as Shinnosuke Nohara
- Miki Narahashi as Misae Nohara
- Keiji Fujiwara as Hiroshi Nohara
- Satomi Korogi as Himawari Nohara
- Mari Mashiba as Toru Kazama and Shiro
- Tamao Hayashi as Nene Sakurada
- Teiyū Ichiryūsai as Masao Satou
- Chie Sato as Bo Suzuki alias Bo-chan
- Haruhi Nanao as Midori Yoshinaga
- Michie Tomizawa as Ume Matsuzaka
- Kotono Mitsuishi as Masumi Ageo
- Junpei Morita as Principal Bunta Takakura alias Enchou Sensei
- Shizuka Itō as Nanako Oohara

=== Guest cast ===
- Ken Yasuda as Yumehiko Nubatama
- Michiko Kichise as Sayuri Nubatama
- Tonikaku Akarui Yasumura as himself

== Production ==
The movie takes place in the world of dreams. It is the first time that 'dream' is chosen to be the theme of a Crayon Shin-chan movie. It is also the first time that a comedian, Hitori Gekidan, was appointed for writing the screenplay. Gekidan said that he had a strong interest in dreams for a long time and wanted to implement its mysterious charm as the theme of this movie. He revealed that this movie is exciting and funny as well as emotional and touching. He expects many families and anime fans to show up in theaters like the previous year. He said that there was greater pressure on him as this movie is a work made for fans, i.e. fan service. So to live up to the expectations of the fans, he took around 7 to 8 months, holding meetings with staffs, to improve the plot. He also said that while writing the story he also thought from his daughter's point of view so that the movie can be enjoyed by both parents and children alike. He said that using the tool of animation, he fully represented an appealing fantasy dreamland where Shinnosuke is going berserk. In addition, for the first time in eight years, Wataru Takahashi was involved in writing the screenplay of a Crayon Shin-chan movie, his last time being in the 16th movie Crayon Shin-chan: The Storm Called: The Hero of Kinpoko. Incidentally, the 16th movie too had some elements of 'dream' in it.

== Music ==
=== Opening Theme Song ===
- Kimi ni 100 Percent (Warner Music Japan / unBORDE)
  - Lyrics: Yasutaka Nakata
  - Vocals: Kyary Pamyu Pamyu

=== Ending Theme Song ===
- "Hey Friend〜 Ahead also forever..." (友よ〜この先もずっと..., Tomo yo〜 Kono saki mo zutto...)
  - Lyrics and Vocals: Ketsumeishi

=== Insert Song ===
- "Tonikaku Akarui Yasumura- Fully naked pose song" (とにかく明るい安村 全裸に見えるポーズソング, Tonikaku Akarui Yasumura Zenra ni mieru pōzusongu)
  - Composer: Ryouhan Fujii

== International release ==
This movie was released in Malaysia, Indonesia and Singapore theaters with English subtitles as Crayon Shin-chan: Fast Asleep! The Great Assault on the Dreaming World! It aired in India on Sony YAY! on 18th August 2024 as Shin-chan In The Dreaming World.

== Box office ==
The film was second at the box office in its opening weekend behind Detective Conan: The Darkest Nightmare, grossing US$3.7 million, a larger opening than the previous film in the series. It grossed further US$6.6 million in next two weeks, again ranking second. The movie grossed an all total of 2.11 billion yen ($20.6 million USD) in its run.

The film was released in China on November 4, 2016, and grossed CN¥22.5 million.

== DVD and Blu-Ray Release ==
The DVD and Blu-Ray of this movie was released on November 4, 2016, by Bandai Visual.
