= Yasumura =

Yasumura (written: 保村 or 安村) is a Japanese surname. Notable people with the surname include:

- Makoto Yasumura (保村 真), Japanese voice actor
- Tonikaku Akarui Yasumura (とにかく明るい安村; born 1982), Japanese comedian
