= Britain's Got Talent series 17 =

Britain's Got Talent
- Series 17
- Presented by: Ant & Dec
- Judges: Bruno Tonioli; Alesha Dixon; Amanda Holden; Simon Cowell
- Winner: Sydnie Christmas
- Runner-up: Jack Rhodes

Release
- Original network: ITV1
- Original release: 20 April – 2 June 2024

Series chronology
- ← Previous; Series 16 Next → Series 18

The seventeenth series of British talent competition programme Britain's Got Talent began airing on ITV1 on 20 April 2024 and concluded on 2 June 2024. The series was again presented by Ant & Dec, with Simon Cowell, Amanda Holden, Alesha Dixon and Bruno Tonioli returning to the judging panel.

The seventeenth series was won by singer Sydnie Christmas, with magician Jack Rhodes finishing in second place, and dance duo Abigail & Afronitaaa placing third place. Christmas was the first solo female winner of the show which was not a dog act, and Abigail & Afronitaaa were also the second act from an African country to finish in the Final 3.

Judges and Presenter(s) for Britain's Got Talent Series 17

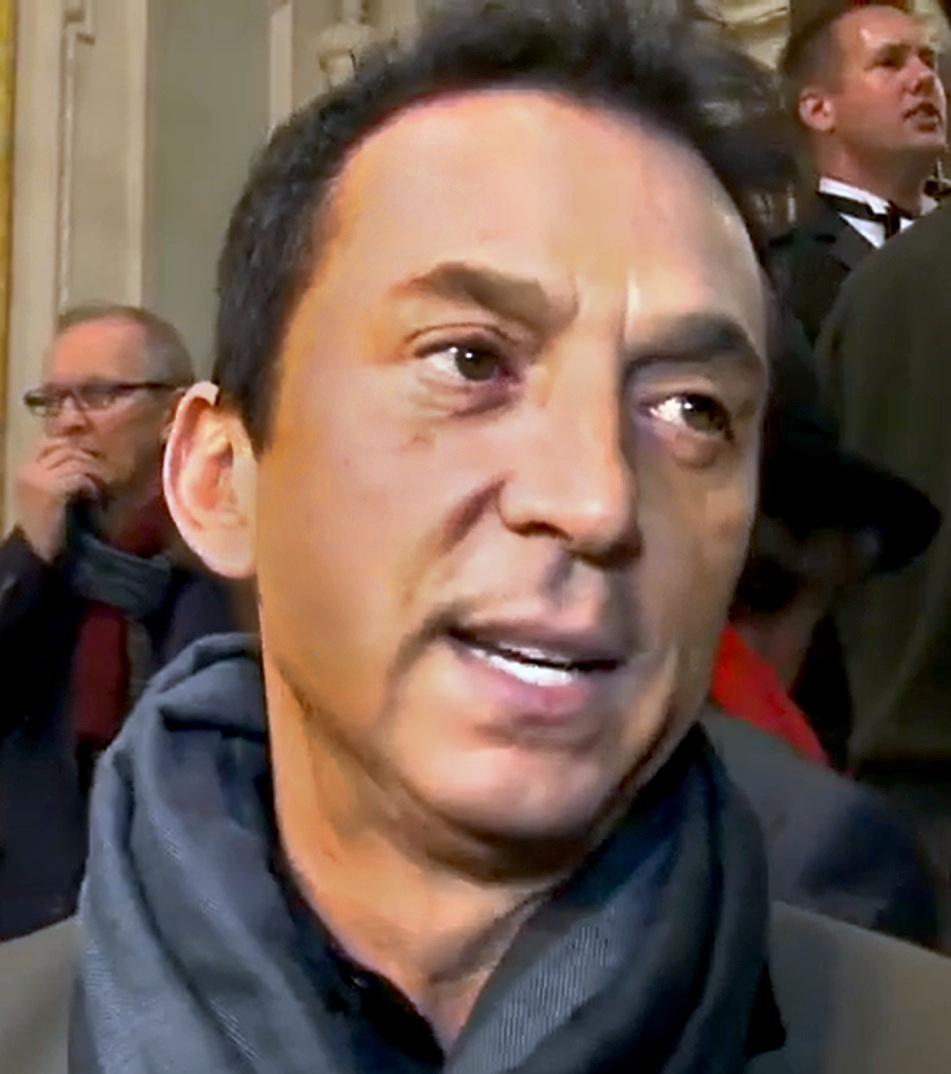
Bruno Tonioli

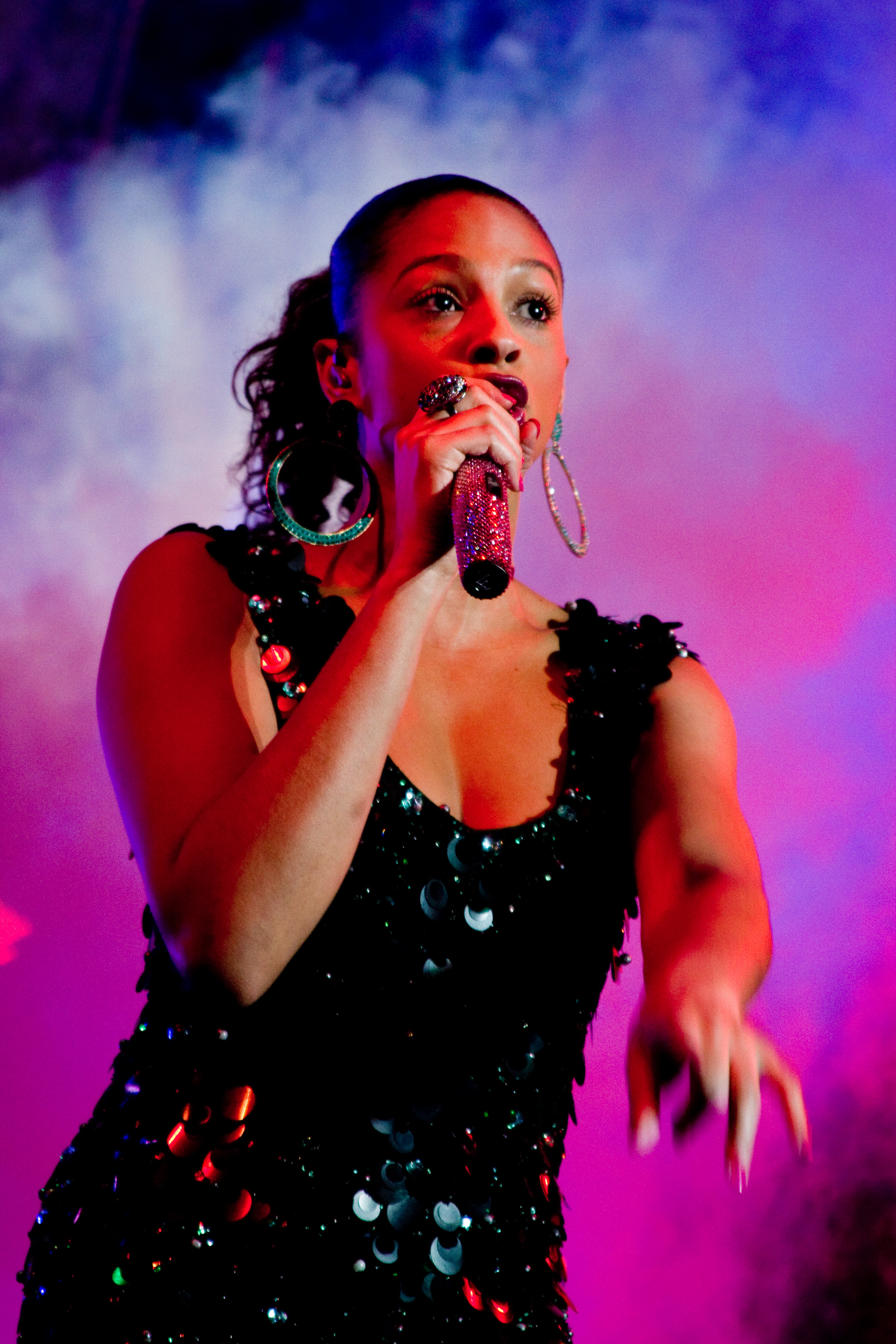
Alesha Dixon

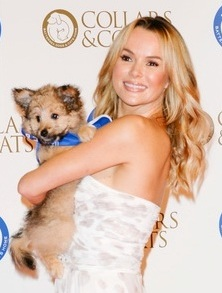
Amanda Holden

Simon Cowell

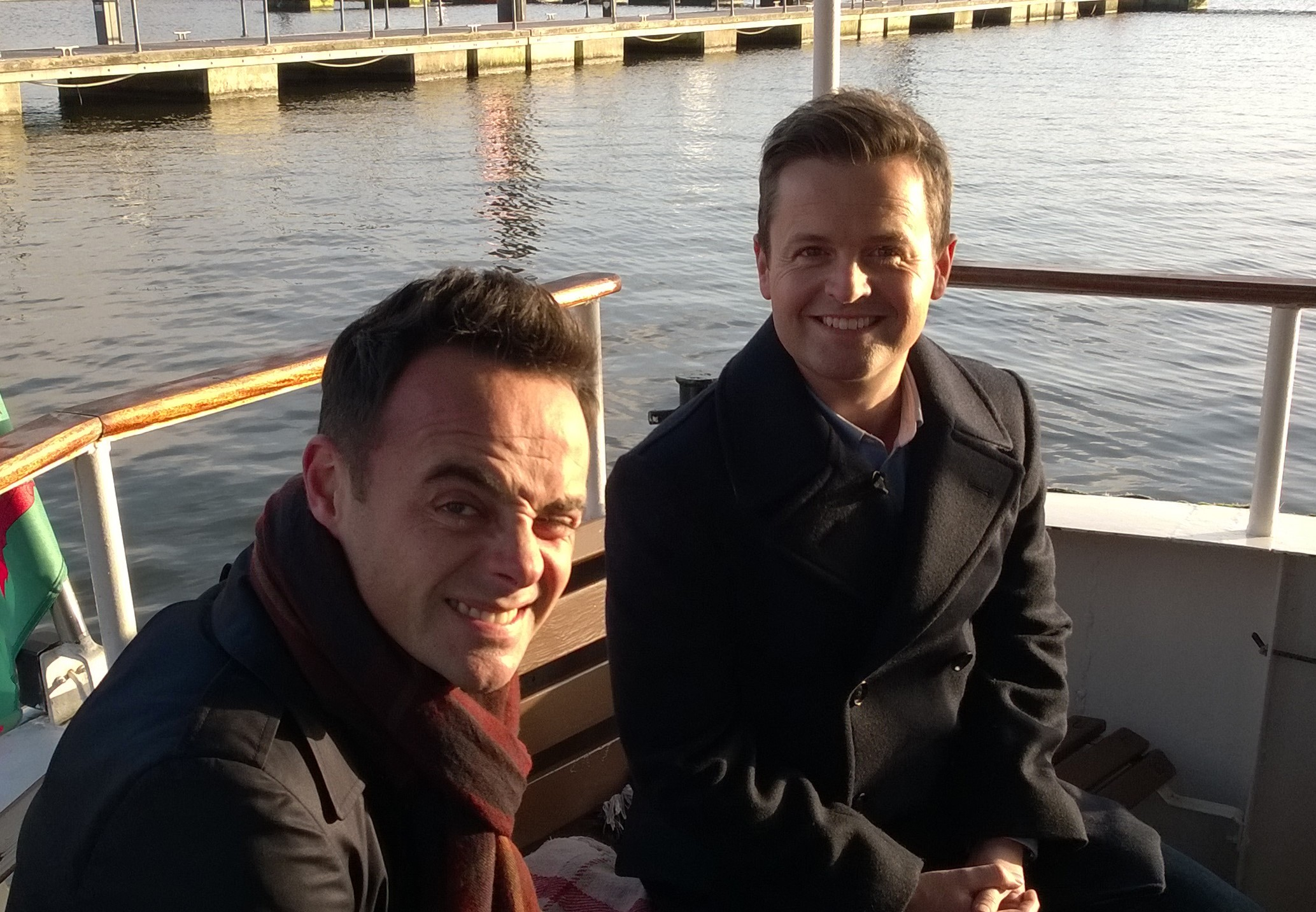
Ant & Dec

== Series overview ==
Following the conclusion of the previous series, it was announced that the show would return for a seventeenth series. It was also confirmed that the judging panel from the previous series would remain the same, with Simon Cowell, Amanda Holden, Alesha Dixon and Bruno Tonioli returning to the show. Filming for the auditions began in January 2024. The first teaser for the series was released on social media in March 2024, with the ten-second trailer confirming that the series was "coming soon" to ITV and ITVX, accompanied by the slogan "Britain, we're back".

Color key:

Winner | Runner-up | Third place | Semi-finalist
Judges' Wildcard Finalist | Golden Buzzer Audition

| Participant | Age(s) | Genre | Performance Type | From | Semi-final | Finished |
|---|---|---|---|---|---|---|
| Abigail & Afronitaaa | 7 & 20 | Dance | Dance Duo | Ghana | 4 | Third place |
| Ace Clvrk | 29 | Singing | Singer | Reading, Berkshire | 2 | Eliminated |
| Alex Mitchell | 23 | Comedy | Stand Up Comedian | Leeds, West Yorkshire | 5 | Finalist |
| AmaSing | 7–12 | Singing | Choir | Chester, Cheshire | 5 | Eliminated |
| Andrew Curphey | 37 | Singing | Singer | Widnes, Cheshire | 4 | Eliminated |
| Bikoon! | —N/a | Variety | Novelty Act | Japan | 1 | Eliminated |
| Blitzers | 19–23 | Singing | K-Pop Group | South Korea | 2 | Eliminated |
| CyberAgent Legit | 20–28 | Dance | Dance Group | Japan | 5 | Eliminated |
| Denise & Stefan | 40 & 52 | Singing / Music | Opera Singer & Pianist | Stoke-on-Trent, Staffordshire | 5 | Eliminated |
| Duncan Murray | 22 | Acrobatics | Pogo Stick Acrobat | New Brunswick, Canada | 3 | Eliminated |
| Duo Stardust | 25 & 27 | Danger | Rollerskating Duo | Ukraine | 1 | Eliminated |
| Gambino Akuboy | 38 | Singing | Afrobeats Singer | Gambia | 5 | Eliminated |
| Geneviève Côté | 48 | Music | Vocalist | Montreal, Canada | 2 | Eliminated |
| Haribow | 22–24 | Variety | Double Dutch Group | Japan | 2 | Finalist |
| Harrison Pettman | 22 | Singing | Singer | Gravesend, Kent | 4 | Eliminated |
| Heather Holliday | 38 | Danger | Sword Swallower | United States | 3 | Eliminated |
| Innocent Masuku | 33 | Singing | Opera Singer | South Africa | 1 | Finalist |
| Itzel Salvatierra | 39 | Acrobatics | Aerialist | Mexico | 4 | Eliminated |
| Jack Rhodes | 27 | Magic | Magician | Ulverston, Cumbria | 2 | Runner-Up |
| Kevin Finn | 30 | Comedy | Stand Up Comedian | Warrington, Cheshire | 4 | Eliminated |
| Lady Grenades | 13–19 | Acrobatics / Dance | Cheerleading Group | Various | 2 | Eliminated |
| Leightonjay Halliday | 23 | Dance | Contemporary Dancer | Douglas, South Lanarkshire | 3 | Eliminated |
| Magicians Assemble^{2} | 15–43 | Magic | Magic Group | Various | 3 | Eliminated |
| Matteo Fraziano | 22 | Variety | Shadow Artist | Rome, Italy | 2 | Eliminated |
| Messoudi Brothers | 30 & 33 | Variety | Juggling Duo | Australia | 5 | Eliminated |
| Mike Woodhams | 37 | Singing / Comedy | Singing Impressionist | Milton Keynes, Buckinghamshire | 3 | Finalist |
| Nabe | 38 | Comedy | Hair Impressionist | Japan | 4 | Eliminated |
| Northants Sings Out | 25–65 | Singing | Choir | Northamptonshire | 4 | Finalist |
| Phoenix Boys | 8–19 | Dance | Contemporary Dance Group | Various | 4 | Eliminated |
| Rask AI | —N/a | Variety | Artificial Intelligence Act | Ukraine | 3 | Eliminated |
| Ravi's Dream Team | 5–78 | Singing | Choir | Brighton, East Sussex | 2 | Eliminated |
| Ssaulabi Performance Troupe | 19–23 | Acrobatics | Martial Arts Troupe | South Korea | 1 | Finalist |
| Sven Smith | 27 | Music | Air Guitarist | London | 1 | Eliminated |
| Sydnie Christmas | 28 | Singing | Singer | Meopham, Kent | 3 | Winner |
| Taryn Charles | 39 | Singing | Singer | Englefield Green, Surrey | 1 | Eliminated |
| The Dark Hero | 40 | Singing | Opera Singer | Gotham City | 5 | Eliminated |
| The Trickstars | 38 & 5 | Animals | Dog Act | Grantham, Lincolnshire | 1 | Finalist |
| Trey Braine | 10 | Dance | Dancer | Manchester | 1 | Eliminated |
| Trixy | 34 | Magic | Magician | London | 5 | Finalist |
| Troll Dancers | 7–12 | Dance | Dance Group | Sandfields, Port Talbot, Wales | 3 | Eliminated |

- ^1 Magicians Assemble is made up of previous contestants Ben Hart and Elizabeth Best of "The Haunting", both of whom were contestants on the thirteenth series, Aidan McCann who was a contestant on the fourteenth series, and Colin Cloud who originally auditioned for the sixth series, before appearing on the twelfth season of America's Got Talent.

=== Semi-finals summary ===
Buzzed out | Judges' vote | Won the Public's Vote | Won the Judges' Vote
Lost Judges' Vote | Eliminated

Prior to the beginning of the live shows, the semi-finalists were decided following a deliberation stage at the London Palladium.

==== Semi-final 1 (27 May) ====
- Guest performance: The Cast of The Lion King ("Circle of Life")

| Semi-Finalist | Order | Performance Type | Buzzes and judges' votes | | | | Percentage | Finished |
| Semi-Finalist | Order | Performance Type | Cowell | Holden | Dixon | Tonioli | Percentage | Finished |
|---|---|---|---|---|---|---|---|---|
| The Trickstars | 1 | Dog Act | | | | | 19.6% | 3rd (Lost Judges' Vote)^{2} |
| Bikoon! | 2 | Novelty Act | | | | | 2.1% | 7th – Eliminated |
| Taryn Charles | 3 | Singer | | | | | 10.2% | 4th – Eliminated |
| Ssaulabi Performance Troupe | 4 | Martial Arts Group | ^{1} | | | | 19.6% | 2nd (Won Judges' Vote) |
| Duo Stardust | 5 | Rollerskating Duo | | | | | 6.6% | 5th – Eliminated |
| Trey Braine | 6 | Dancer | | | | | 5.4% | 6th – Eliminated |
| Sven Smith | 7 | Air Guitarist | | | | | 0.6% | 8th – Eliminated |
| Innocent Masuku | 8 | Opera Singer | | | | | 35.9% | 1st (Won Public Vote) |

- ^1 Cowell did not cast his vote due to the majority support for Ssaulabi Performance Troupe from the other judges, but admitted that his voting intention would have been for this semi-finalist.
- ^2 The Trickstars were later sent through to the final as the judges' wildcard.

==== Semi-final 2 (28 May) ====
- Guest performance: The Cast of Frozen ("For the First Time in Forever"/"Let It Go")

| Semi-Finalist | Order | Performance Type | Buzzes and judges' votes | | | | Percentage | Finished |
| Semi-Finalist | Order | Performance Type | Cowell | Holden | Dixon | Tonioli | Percentage | Finished |
|---|---|---|---|---|---|---|---|---|
| Lady Grenades | 1 | Cheerleading Group | | | | | 9.4% | 4th – Eliminated |
| Blitzers | 2 | K-Pop Band | | | | | 7.8% | 5th – Eliminated |
| Geneviève Côté | 3 | Vocalist | | | | | 6.5% | 6th – Eliminated |
| Jack Rhodes | 4 | Magician | | | | | 27.0% | 1st (Won Public Vote) |
| Ravi's Dream Team | 5 | Choir | | | | | 17.5% | 3rd (Judges' Vote tied – Lost on Public Vote) |
| Matteo Fraziano | 6 | Shadow Artist | | | | | 6.2% | 7th – Eliminated |
| Ace Clvrk | 7 | Singer | | | | | 5.4% | 8th – Eliminated |
| Haribow | 8 | Double Dutch Group | | | | | 20.2% | 2nd (Judges' Vote tied – Won on Public Vote) |

==== Semi-final 3 (29 May) ====
- Guest performance: Calum Scott ("Then There Was You")

| Semi-Finalist | Order | Performance Type | Buzzes and judges' votes | | | | Percentage | Finished |
| Semi-Finalist | Order | Performance Type | Cowell | Holden | Dixon | Tonioli | Percentage | Finished |
|---|---|---|---|---|---|---|---|---|
| Duncan Murray | 1 | Pogo Stick Acrobat | | | | | 2.2% | 8th – Eliminated |
| Magicians Assemble | 2 | Magic Group | | | | | 10.4% | 4th – Eliminated |
| Rask AI | 3 | Artificial Intelligence Act | | | | | 7.7% | 5th – Eliminated |
| Troll Dancers | 4 | Dance Group | | | | | 6.1% | 6th – Eliminated |
| Heather Holliday | 5 | Sword Swallower | | | | | 4.5% | 7th – Eliminated |
| Mike Woodhams | 6 | Singing Impressionist | | | | | 18.6% | 2nd (Judges' Vote tied – Won on Public Vote) |
| Leightonjay Halliday | 7 | Contemporary Dancer | | | | | 12.6% | 3rd (Judges' Vote tied – Lost on Public Vote) |
| Sydnie Christmas | 8 | Singer | | | | | 37.9% | 1st (Won Public Vote) |

==== Semi-final 4 (30 May) ====
- Guest performance: The Cast of & Juliet ("Roar")

| Semi-Finalist | Order | Performance Type | Buzzes and judges' votes | | | | Percentage | Finished |
| Semi-Finalist | Order | Performance Type | Cowell | Holden | Dixon | Tonioli | Percentage | Finished |
|---|---|---|---|---|---|---|---|---|
| Andrew Curphey | 1 | Singer | | | | | 2.0% | 8th – Eliminated |
| Abigail & Afronitaaa | 2 | Dance Duo | | | | | 24.8% | 1st (Won Public Vote) |
| Nabe | 3 | Hair Impressionist | | | | | 7.2% | 6th – Eliminated |
| Phoenix Boys | 4 | Contemporary Dance Group | | | | | 17.6% | 3rd (Judges' Vote tied – Lost on Public Vote) |
| Itzel Salvatierra | 5 | Aerialist | | | | | 9.8% | 5th – Eliminated |
| Harrison Pettman | 6 | Singer | | | | | 14.4% | 4th – Eliminated |
| Kevin Finn | 7 | Stand Up Comedian | | | | | 4.1% | 7th – Eliminated |
| Northants Sings Out | 8 | Choir | | | | | 20.1% | 2nd (Judges' Vote tied – Won on Public Vote) |

==== Semi-final 5 (31 May) ====
- Guest performance: Alesha Dixon ("All I Want"/"B with Me"/"The Boy Does Nothing"/"Scandalous"/"Ransom")

| Semi-Finalist | Order | Performance Type | Buzzes and judges' votes | | | | Percentage | Finished |
| Semi-Finalist | Order | Performance Type | Cowell | Holden | Dixon | Tonioli | Percentage | Finished |
|---|---|---|---|---|---|---|---|---|
| Gambino Akuboy | 1 | Afrobeats Singer | | | | | 3.5% | 7th – Eliminated |
| Trixy | 2 | Magician | | | | | 18.2% | 3rd (Won Judges' Vote) |
| Messoudi Brothers | 3 | Juggling Duo | | | | | 11.9% | 4th – Eliminated |
| The Dark Hero | 4 | Opera Singer | | | | | 2.3% | 8th – Eliminated |
| Alex Mitchell | 5 | Stand Up Comedian | | | | | 24.7% | 1st (Won Public Vote) |
| AmaSing | 6 | Choir | | | | | 6.2% | 6th – Eliminated |
| CyberAgent Legit | 7 | Dance Group | | | | | 11.1% | 5th – Eliminated |
| Denise & Stefan | 8 | Opera Singer & Pianist | | | | | 22.1% | 2nd (Lost Judges' Vote) |

=== Final (2 June) ===
Guest performance: The Cast Of Mamma Mia! ("Mamma Mia"/"Dancing Queen"/"Waterloo")

Winner | Runner-up | Third place

| Finalist | Order | Performance Type | Percentage | Finished |
|---|---|---|---|---|
| Haribow | 1 | Double Dutch Group | 3.1% | 11th |
| The Trickstars | 2 | Dog Act | 8.4% | 5th |
| Abigail & Afronitaaa | 3 | Dance Duo | 10.4% | 3rd |
| Alex Mitchell | 4 | Stand Up Comedian | 5.3% | 8th |
| Trixy^{3} | 5 | Magician | 5.9% | 6th |
| Innocent Masuku | 6 | Opera Singer | 8.8% | 4th |
| Ssaulabi Performance Troupe | 7 | Martial Arts Group | 4.8% | 10th |
| Northants Sings Out | 8 | Choir | 4.9% | 9th |
| Mike Woodhams | 9 | Singing Impressionist | 5.4% | 7th |
| Jack Rhodes | 10 | Magician | 15.8% | 2nd |
| Sydnie Christmas | 11 | Singer | 27.2% | 1st |

- ^3 Simon Cowell buzzed Trixy as a part of his act.

== Ratings ==
| Episode | Air date | Total viewers (millions) | ITV Weekly rank |
|---|---|---|---|
| Auditions 1 | 20 April | 7.26 | 1 |
| Auditions 2 | 21 April | 6.25 | 2 |
| Auditions 3 | 27 April | 7.03 | 1 |
| Auditions 4 | 4 May | 6.84 | 1 |
| Auditions 5 | 12 May | 5.59 | 2 |
| Auditions 6 | 18 May | 6.08 | 2 |
| Auditions 7 | 25 May | 6.30 | 2 |
| Auditions 8 | 26 May | 5.31 | 3 |
| Semi-Final 1 | 27 May | 5.25 | 2 |
| Semi-Final 2 | 28 May | 5.16 | 3 |
| Semi-Final 3 | 29 May | 4.82 | 4 |
| Semi-Final 4 | 30 May | 4.68 | 9 |
| Semi-Final 5 | 31 May | 4.81 | 5 |
| Final | 2 June | 6.01 | 1 |
