= Gambino Akuboy =

Gambian musician

- Born: Muhammed Hakeem Mahoney; 8 March; Banjul, Gambia
- Genres: Afrobeats; Afro-pop
- Occupation(s): Singer-songwriter, film producer
- Years active: 2005–present

Muhammed Hakeem Mahoney born in Gambia, also known professionally as Gambino Akuboy, is an Afrobeats singer & songwriter, actor and screenwriter. Born in Gambia, he now lives in the UK. Gambino is known for acting and film script writing and has written for Gambia national TV. In 2016 he won the Best Music Video at the Wah Sa Halat Music Awards in The Gambia and his music is frequently played on BBC radio. Gambino together with Ousman Jarju founded RebelVZN, an independent multimedia production company, that produced short films like MEBET. In May 2024 Gambino appeared as a contestant on Series 17 of Britain's Got Talent, where he reached the semi-finals, before being eliminated.

== Early life and acting/Screenwriter career ==
Gambino was born in Banjul, capital of Gambia. As a teenager he started his career as an Actor and played several lead roles. Movies he starred in were also aired on Gambia's National Television. In 2006 Gambino wrote the film "Calabash".

== British Army/Music career/Film industry ==
After traveling to the UK to study multimedia, Gambino joined the British Army for eight years. In the summer of 2013 he was posted to Kenya, where he met the Kenyan rapper Chieftain, with whom he recorded his first song. In 2015 he left the army to start his music career and to continue his work in the Film industry.

At the start of 2016, Gambino released the song Dancefloor on which he featured Saint Da Gambian, known well in the Gambian rapping circles. The video was produced by David Nicol-Sey and adjudged Best Music Video at the Gambian Wah Sa Halat Music Awards. In December 2016, Gambino Akuboy released the song ‘Wish You Well’ with a video shot by Enos Olik in Kenya.

== Music releases ==
During 2017 Gambino released several songs including: Chameleon (with Kenyan singer Sati), What A Bum Bum (with Gambian rapper MLK) and Tsunami. In October 2017 the song Worry Them, a collaboration with the London rappers Yun Kilz and Uncle Bimz, was released with a video published on GRM.

2018 was the year Akuboy released further singles like the Dancehall track Kolo, featuring ENC, which was aired on BBC Introducing and 6 Music, African Baby, and The Ding Dong Song – NG10 is Calling, which also aired on BBC Introducing. The single No Man No Cry featuring Uncle Bimz and Yun Kilz, produced by Killmatic, one of R2Bees beat-makers is from 2018.

Shining Star was Gambino Akuboy's first releases of 2019, it also aired on BBC Introducing. In 2019 he released Party Alien and Ready to Go.

One of his 2020 singles released in the spring of that year is called Corona which featured Uncle Bimz and S.Kay.

== Selected discography ==
Year	Title/and featuring acts on songs
2016	Wish You well – Gambino Akuboy
2017	Chukurr-Chakarr – Gambino Akuboy | What A Bum Bum – Gambino Akuboy ft MLK | Tsunami – Gambino Akuboy | Worry Them – Gambino Akuboy ft Uncle Bimz & Yun Kilz
2018	African Baby – Gambino Akuboy, Kisean & Uncle Bimz | The Ding Dong Song (NG10 is Calling) – Gambino Akuboy | No Man No Cry – Gambino Akuboy ft Uncle Bimz & Yun Kilz
2019	Party Alien – Gambino Akuboy | Kurung Karang – Gambino Akuboy | Ready To Go – Gambino Akuboy ft Afro-B & Major Notes
2020	Weekend – Gambino Akuboy | Corona – Gambino Akuboy ft Uncle Bimz & Kay S
