= Britain's Got Talent series 16 =

British talent competition series

Britain's Got Talent
- Series 16
- Presented by: Ant & Dec
- Judges: Bruno Tonioli; Alesha Dixon; Amanda Holden; Simon Cowell
- Winner: Viggo Venn
- Runner-up: Lillianna Clifton

Release
- Original network: ITV
- Original release: 15 April – 4 June 2023

Series chronology
- ← Previous; Series 15 Next → Series 17

The sixteenth series of British talent competition programme Britain's Got Talent was broadcast on ITV, from 15 April to 4 June 2023. Following the previous series, David Walliams resigned from the programme in the wake of criticism to comments he had made of contestants during the 2020 series, leading to him being replaced by Bruno Tonioli in January 2023. During auditions, Cowell allowed a change to the Golden Buzzer format, granting more being given than in previous series.

The sixteenth series was won by comedian Viggo Venn, with dancer Lillianna Clifton finishing in second place, and magician Cillian O’Connor placing third. During its broadcast, the series averaged 5.98 million viewers. Venn was the second international act to win, and he was the third consecutive comedy act to win, following Jon Courtenay and Axel Blake.

Judges and Presenter(s) for Britain's Got Talent Series 16

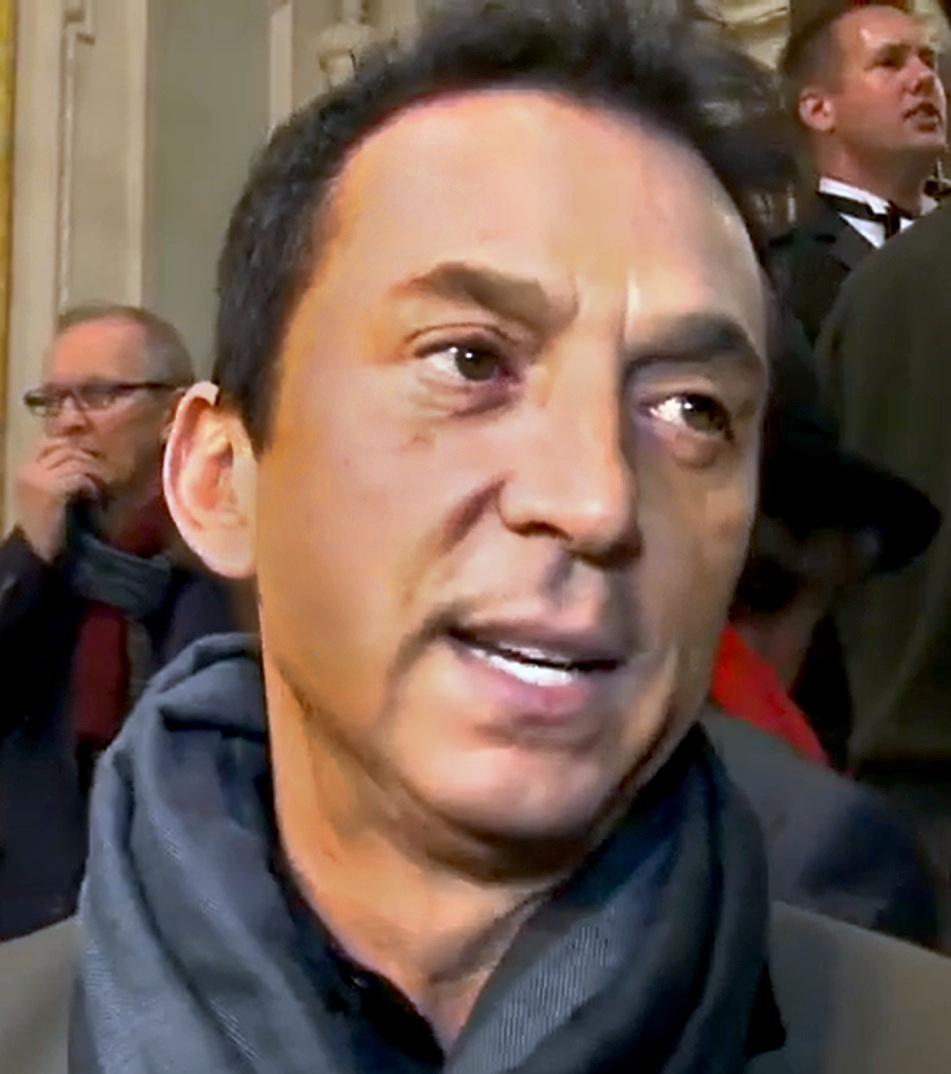
Bruno Tonioli

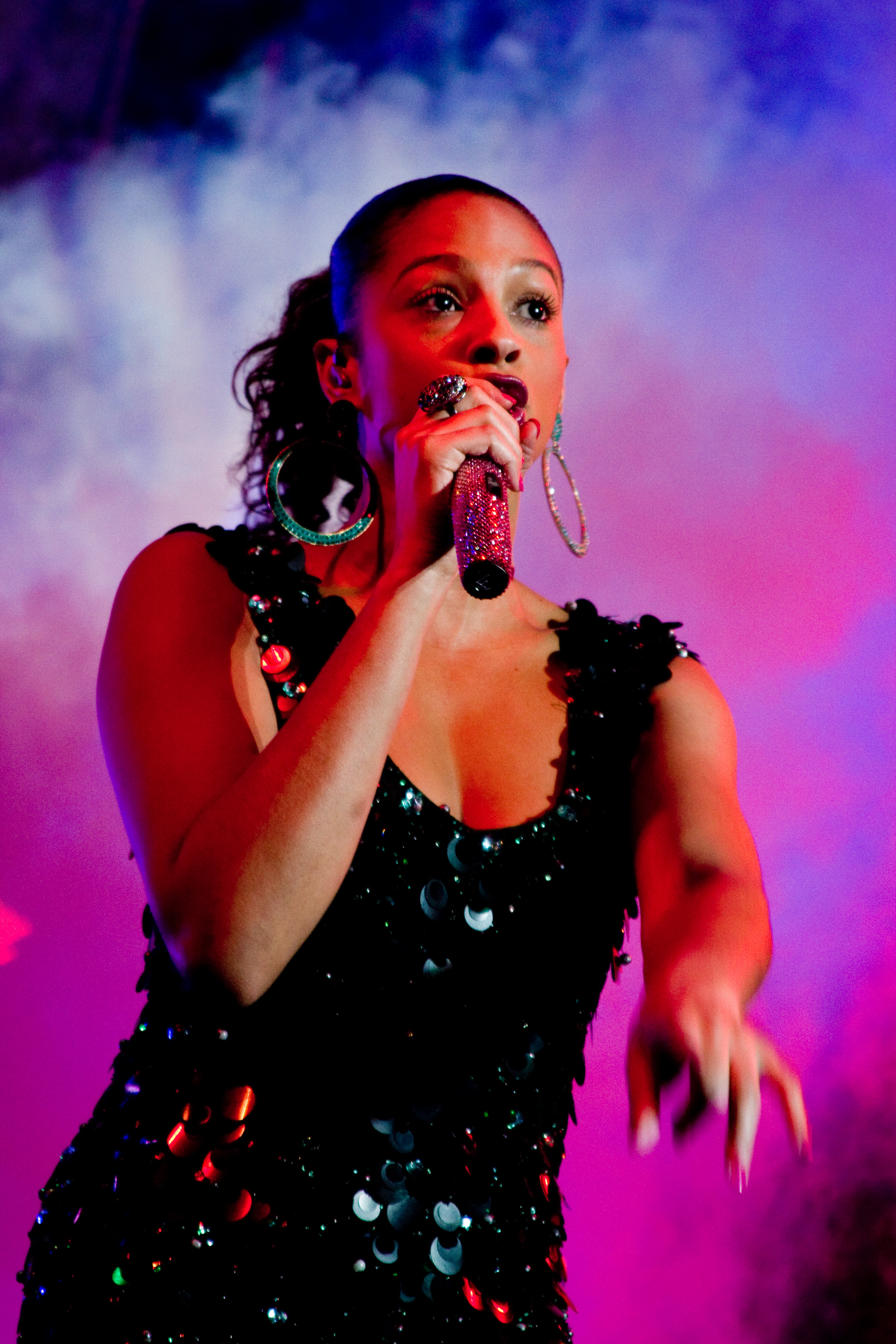
Alesha Dixon

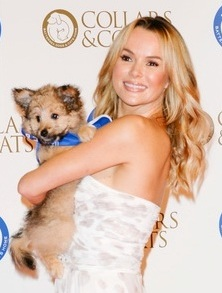
Amanda Holden

Simon Cowell

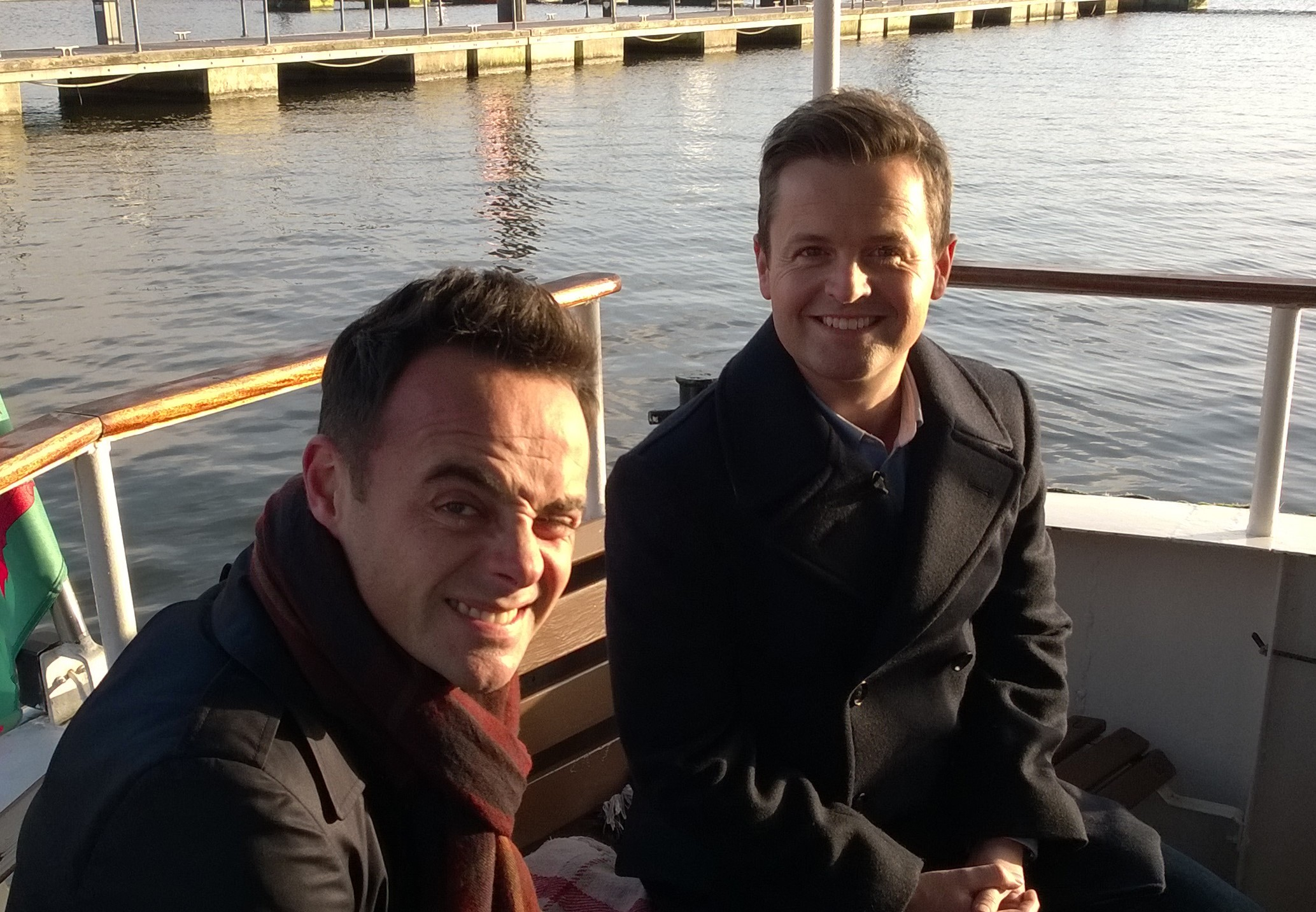
Ant & Dec

== Series overview ==
Following the conclusion of the previous series, ITV announced that the show would return for a sixteenth series. However, David Walliams was facing an uncertain future with the programme after ten series, after it emerged he was facing criticism for comments he had made of contestants that had been poorly received by viewers; Walliams later resigned when it became clear the criticism couldn't be ignored. Because of his departure, ITV worked to find a replacement, and signed on former Strictly Come Dancing and current Dancing with the Stars judge Bruno Tonioli in January 2023 to join with Cowell and the other judges.

Cowell also announced that month of a change in format, revealing that he had given the audience the right to call for a Golden Buzzer for a contestant they felt deserved it, noting that there had been no set rules regarding the buzzer format since it was first introduced. Tonioli also gave an extra Golden Buzzer himself, but by accident after doing so halfway through a contestant's act; something which had never been done before within the Got Talent franchise itself.

Color key:

Winner | Runner-up | Third Place | Semi-finalist
Judges' Wildcard Finalist | Golden Buzzer Audition

| Participant | Age(s) | Genre | Performance Type | Semi-final | Finished |
|---|---|---|---|---|---|
| Abi Carter-Simpson | 30 | Singing / Music | Singer & Ukulelist | 1 | Eliminated |
| Amy Lou | 34 | Singing | Singer | 1 | Finalist |
| Andrew Stanton | 42 | Danger | Sword Swallower | 2 | Eliminated |
| Boycanto | 6–12 | Singing | Vocal Group | 4 | Eliminated |
| Cammy Barnes | 32 | Singing / Music | Singer & Guitarist | 5 | Eliminated |
| Chickenshed | 5–37 | Singing | Vocal Group | 4 | Eliminated |
| Cillian O'Connor | 13 | Magic | Close Up Magician | 5 | Third place |
| Duo Odyssey | 27 & 33 | Acrobatics | Aerial Duo | 4 | Finalist |
| Dylan B | 12 | Singing | Singer | 3 | Eliminated |
| Enzo Weyne | 33 | Magic | Magician | 1 | Eliminated |
| Felix Clements | 24 | Dance | Contemporary Dancer | 4 | Eliminated |
| Gamal John | 36 | Singing | Singer | 1 | Eliminated |
| Ghetto Kids | 5–13 | Dance | Dance Group | 3 | Finalist |
| Harry Churchill | 11 | Music | Guitarist | 3 | Eliminated |
| Ichikawa Koikuchi | 42 | Variety | Flatulist | 1 | Eliminated |
| Johns' Boys | 14–73 | Singing | Choir | 2 | Eliminated |
| Kimoon Do | 31 | Magic | Magician | 4 | Eliminated |
| Lewis Fuller | 24 | Singing / Magic | Singer & Magician | 2 | Eliminated |
| Lillianna Clifton | 13 | Dance | Contemporary Dancer | 5 | Runner-Up |
| Malakai Bayoh | 13 | Singing | Opera Singer | 4 | Finalist |
| Markus Birdman | 52 | Comedy | Stand Up Comedian | 3 | Eliminated |
| MB14 | 28 | Music | Beatboxer | 4 | Eliminated |
| Miki Dark | 57 | Danger / Magic | Stunt Magician | 3 | Eliminated |
| Musa Motha | 27 | Dance | Contemporary Dancer | 1 | Finalist |
| Nathan & Joanne | 24 & 28 | Dance | Dance Duo | 2 | Eliminated |
| Noodle^{1} | 24 | Singing | Singer | 4 | Eliminated |
| Notorious | 8–16 | Dance | Dance Group | 3 | Eliminated |
| Nurse Georgie Carroll | 47 | Comedy | Stand Up Comedian | 5 | Eliminated |
| Olivia Lynes | 11 | Singing | Musical Theatre Singer | 2 | Finalist |
| Parkour Collective | 20–25 | Acrobatics | Parkour Trio | 1 | Eliminated |
| Romeo & Icy | 20 & 21 | Dance | Dance Duo | 5 | Eliminated |
| The Pixiebelles | 6–9 | Singing | Theatre Group | 5 | Eliminated |
| Tia Connolly | 15 | Singing | Singer | 2 | Eliminated |
| Tonikaku | 41 | Variety | Novelty Act | 5 | Finalist |
| Toy Toy Toy | 26 & 34 | Variety | Yo-Yo Duo | 3 | Eliminated |
| Travis George | 22 | Singing | Opera Singer | 3 | Finalist |
| United 2 Dance | 9–11 | Dance | Ballroom Dance Group | 1 | Eliminated |
| Unity | 16–25 | Dance | Contemporary Dance Group | 5 | Eliminated |
| Viggo Venn | 33 | Comedy | Comedian | 2 | Winner |
| Yo Highness | 10–26 | Dance | Dance Group | 2 | Eliminated |

- ^1 During the fourth semi-final, Noodle was revealed to be series 15 finalist Tom Ball. Ball's identity was kept a secret by production staff throughout the series - all details listed here pertain to his unveiling as the voice of Noodle in the semi-final.

=== Semi-finals summary ===
Buzzed out | Judges' vote | Won the Public's Vote | Won the Judges' Vote
Lost Judges' Vote | Eliminated

Prior to the beginning of the live shows, the semi-finalists were decided following a deliberation stage at the London Palladium.

==== Semi-final 1 (29 May) ====
- Guest performance: Diversity

| Semi-Finalist | Order | Performance Type | Buzzes and judges' votes | | | | Percentage | Finished |
| Semi-Finalist | Order | Performance Type | Cowell | Holden | Dixon | Tonioli | Percentage | Finished |
|---|---|---|---|---|---|---|---|---|
| United 2 Dance | 1 | Ballroom Dance Group | | | | | 4.3% | 6th – Eliminated |
| Gamal John | 2 | Singer | | | | | 4.1% | 7th – Eliminated |
| Ichikawa Koikuchi | 3 | Flatulist | | | | | 1.0% | 8th – Eliminated |
| Enzo Weyne | 4 | Magician | | | | | 10.0% | 4th – Eliminated |
| Parkour Collective | 5 | Parkour Trio | | | | | 7.5% | 5th – Eliminated |
| Abi Carter-Simpson | 6 | Singer & Ukulelist | | | | | 16.6% | 3rd (Judges' Vote tied – Lost on Public Vote) |
| Amy Lou | 7 | Singer | | | | | 18.3% | 2nd (Judges' Vote tied – Won on Public Vote) |
| Musa Motha | 8 | Contemporary Dancer | | | | | 38.2% | 1st (Won Public Vote) |

==== Semi-final 2 (30 May) ====
- Guest performance: The cast of We Will Rock You ("Don't Stop Me Now"/"We Will Rock You"/"We Are the Champions")

| Semi-Finalist | Order | Performance Type | Buzzes and judges' votes | | | | Percentage | Finished |
| Semi-Finalist | Order | Performance Type | Cowell | Holden | Dixon | Tonioli | Percentage | Finished |
|---|---|---|---|---|---|---|---|---|
| Yo Highness | 1 | Dance Group | | | | | 5.1% | 6th – Eliminated |
| Olivia Lynes | 2 | Musical Theatre Singer | | | | | 13.3% | 3rd (Won Judges' Vote) |
| Nathan & Joanne | 3 | Dance Duo | | | | | 7.2% | 4th – Eliminated |
| Lewis Fuller | 4 | Magician & Singer | | | | | 6.8% | 5th – Eliminated |
| Tia Connolly | 5 | Singer | | | | | 3.9% | 7th – Eliminated |
| Andrew Stanton | 6 | Sword Swallower | | | | | 3.6% | 8th – Eliminated |
| Johns' Boys | 7 | Choir | | | | | 16.4% | 2nd (Lost Judges' Vote) |
| Viggo Venn | 8 | Comedian | | | | | 43.7% | 1st (Won Public Vote) |

==== Semi-final 3 (31 May) ====
Guest performance: James Arthur ("A Year Ago")

| Semi-Finalist | Order | Performance Type | Buzzes and judges' votes | | | | Percentage | Finished |
| Semi-Finalist | Order | Performance Type | Cowell | Holden | Dixon | Tonioli | Percentage | Finished |
|---|---|---|---|---|---|---|---|---|
| Harry Churchill | 1 | Guitarist | | | | | 9.5% | 3rd (Judges' Vote tied – Lost on Public Vote) |
| Miki Dark | 2 | Stunt Magician | | | | | 5.1% | 7th – Eliminated |
| Travis George | 3 | Opera Singer | | | | | 19.4% | 2nd (Judges' Vote tied – Won on Public Vote) |
| Notorious | 4 | Dance Group | | | | | 8.0% | 4th – Eliminated |
| Markus Birdman | 5 | Stand Up Comedian | | | | | 2.8% | 8th – Eliminated |
| Ghetto Kids | 6 | Dance Group | | | | | 39.7% | 1st (Won Public Vote) |
| Toy Toy Toy | 7 | Yo-yo Duo | | | | | 8.0% | 5th – Eliminated |
| Dylan B | 8 | Singer | | | | | 7.5% | 6th – Eliminated |

==== Semi-final 4 (1 June) ====
Guest performance: Axel Blake

| Semi-Finalist | Order | Performance Type | Buzzes and judges' votes | | | | Percentage | Finished |
| Semi-Finalist | Order | Performance Type | Cowell | Holden | Dixon | Tonioli | Percentage | Finished |
|---|---|---|---|---|---|---|---|---|
| Noodle | 1 | Singer | | | | | 9.0% | 5th – Eliminated |
| Chickenshed | 2 | Vocal Group | | | | | 8.6% | 6th – Eliminated |
| Kimoon Do | 3 | Close Up Magician | | | | | 2.8% | 8th – Eliminated |
| MB14 | 4 | Beatboxer | | | | | 13.1% | 3rd (Judges' Vote tied – Lost on Public Vote) |
| Boycanto | 5 | Vocal Group | | | | | 7.2% | 7th - Eliminated |
| Duo Odyssey | 6 | Aerial Duo | | | | | 21.8% | 2nd (Judges' Vote tied – Won on Public Vote) |
| Felix Clements | 7 | Contemporary Dancer | | | | | 10.0% | 4th – Eliminated |
| Malakai Bayoh | 8 | Opera Singer | | | | | 27.5% | 1st (Won Public Vote) |

==== Semi-final 5 (2 June) ====
Guest performance: The cast of The Wizard of Oz ("We're Off to See the Wizard"/"Over the Rainbow"/"If I Only Had a Brain"/"The Merry Old Land of Oz")

| Semi-Finalist | Order | Performance Type | Buzzes and judges' votes | | | | Percentage | Finished |
| Semi-Finalist | Order | Performance Type | Cowell | Holden | Dixon | Tonioli | Percentage | Finished |
|---|---|---|---|---|---|---|---|---|
| Romeo & Icy | 1 | Dance Duo | | | | | 1.2% | 8th – Eliminated |
| Lillianna Clifton | 2 | Contemporary Dancer | ^{2} | | | | 17.7% | 3rd (Won Judges' Vote) |
| Nurse Georgie Carroll | 3 | Stand Up Comedian | | | | | 5.9% | 6th – Eliminated |
| Cillian O'Connor | 4 | Close Up Magician | | | | | 29.4% | 1st (Won Public Vote) |
| The Pixiebelles | 5 | Theatre Group | | | | | 4.4% | 7th – Eliminated |
| Cammy Barnes | 6 | Singer & Guitarist | | | | | 10.6% | 5th – Eliminated |
| Unity | 7 | Contemporary Dance Group | | | | | 12.5% | 4th – Eliminated |
| Tonikaku | 8 | Novelty Act | | | | | 18.3% | 2nd (Lost Judges' Vote)^{3} |

- ^2 Due to the majority vote for Lillianna Clifton, Cowell's voting intention was not revealed.
- ^3 Tonikaku was later sent through to the final as the judges' wildcard.

=== Final (4 June) ===
Guest performance: Susan Boyle & the cast of Les Misérables ("I Dreamed a Dream"/"Finale")

| Finalist | Order | Performance Type | Percentage | Finished |
|---|---|---|---|---|
| Ghetto Kids | 1 | Dance Group | 10.1% | 6th |
| Olivia Lynes | 2 | Musical Theatre Singer | 4.2% | 9th |
| Amy Lou | 3 | Singer | 5.8% | 7th |
| Tonikaku | 4 | Novelty Act | 2.9% | 11th |
| Travis George | 5 | Opera Singer | 4.4% | 8th |
| Duo Odyssey | 6 | Aerial Duo | 3.0% | 10th |
| Cillian O'Connor | 7 | Close Up Magician | 11.8% | 3rd |
| Lillianna Clifton | 8 | Contemporary Dancer | 13.1% | 2nd |
| Viggo Venn | 9 | Comedian | 22.5% | 1st |
| Musa Motha | 10 | Contemporary Dancer | 10.9% | 5th |
| Malakai Bayoh | 11 | Opera Singer | 11.3% | 4th |

== Ratings ==
| Episode | Air date | Total viewers (millions) | ITV Weekly rank |
|---|---|---|---|
| Auditions 1 | 15 April | 7.10 | 1 |
| Auditions 2 | 16 April | 6.42 | 2 |
| Auditions 3 | 22 April | 7.32 | 1 |
| Auditions 4 | 29 April | 6.49 | 1 |
| Auditions 5 | 6 May | 6.63 | 5 |
| Auditions 6 | 14 May | 5.70 | 3 |
| Auditions 7 | 20 May | 5.96 | 1 |
| Auditions 8 | 27 May | 5.92 | 1 |
| Semi-Final 1 | 29 May | 5.58 | 2 |
| Semi-Final 2 | 30 May | 5.38 | 3 |
| Semi-Final 3 | 31 May | 5.00 | 5 |
| Semi-Final 4 | 1 June | 4.80 | 6 |
| Semi-Final 5 | 2 June | 5.04 | 4 |
| Final | 4 June | 6.33 | 1 |
