= Blitzers =

South Korean boy band

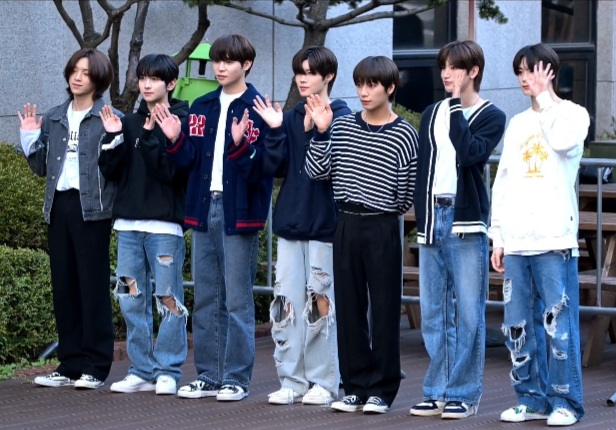
- Blitzers in September 2022

Background information
- Origin: Seoul, South Korea
- Genres: K-pop
- Years active: 2021–present
- Labels: Wuzo Entertainment
- Spinoffs: NPC DS
- Members: Jinhwa; Juhan; Sya; Chris; Lutan; Wooju
- Past members: Go_U
- Website: Blitzers

Blitzers (Korean: 블리처스, stylized in all caps) is a South Korean boy band formed by Wuzo Entertainment in 2021. The group consists of six members: Jinhwa, Juhan, Sya, Chris, Lutan, and Wooju. Originally a septet, Go_U left the group in January 2024. The group debuted on May 12, 2021, with the EP Check-In. In May 2024, the group appeared on the 17th series of Britain's Got Talent, where they finished as semi-finalists.

== Members ==
Adapted from their Melon Profile.

=== Current ===
- Jinhwa (진화)
- Juhan (주한)
- Sya (샤)
- Chris (크리스)
- Lutan (루탄)
- Wooju (우주)

=== Former ===
- Go_U (고유)

== Discography ==
=== Extended plays ===
List of extended plays, showing selected details, selected chart positions and sales figures
Title	Details	Peak chart positions	Sales
Title	Details	KOR	Sales
Check-In	Released: May 12, 2021; Label: Wuzo Entertainment; Formats: CD, digital download, streaming; Track listing: 1. "Blitz (Next Level Remix)"; 2. "Check-In"; 3. "Breathe Again"; 4. "Ocean Blue"; 5. "Dream Pilot"; 6. "Drawing Paper" (도화지)	12	KOR: 10,665
Seat-Belt	Released: October 6, 2021; Label: Wuzo Entertainment; Formats: CD, digital download, streaming; Track listing: 1. "K-Pop"; 2. "Seat-Belt"; 3. "Will Make a Mistake" (실수 좀 할게); 4. "Hop-in" (내적댄스); 5. "Love Bottle"; 6. "Rain Drop"	11	KOR: 28,883
Win-Dow	Released: July 20, 2022; Label: Wuzo Entertainment; Formats: CD, digital download, streaming; Track listing: 1. "Slide" (미끄럼틀); 2. "Win-Dow"; 3. "Hit the Bass"; 4. "Love is New Gravity"; 5. "Hapoom"; 6. "Gradation"	10	KOR: 53,161
Lunch-Box	Scheduled: June 19, 2024; Label: Wuzo Entertainment; Formats: CD, digital download, streaming; Track listing: 1. "Race Up"; 2. "Super Power"; 3. "Ring Ring"; 4. "Fxxxin Spring" (빌어먹을 이 봄 따위); 5. "Super Power" (English ver.); 6. "Macarena" (English ver.)	9	KOR: 69,239

=== Single albums ===
List of single albums, showing selected details, selected chart positions and sales figures
Title	Details	Peak chart positions	Sales
Title	Details	KOR	Sales
Bobbin	Released: January 3, 2022; Label: Wuzo Entertainment; Formats: CD, digital download, streaming; Track listing: 1. "Simon Says" (가라사대); 2. "Bobbin" (끄덕끄덕끄덕); 3. "Forever in My Heart"	13	KOR: 18,336
Macarena	Released: April 24, 2023; Label: Wuzo Entertainment; Formats: CD, digital download, streaming; Track listing: 1. "Macarena" (마카레나); 2. "Question Mark"	17	KOR: 28,540

=== Singles ===
List of singles, showing year released and name of the album
Title	Year	Album
"Breathe Again"	2021	Check-In
"Will Make a Mistake" (실수 좀 할게)	2021	Seat-Belt
"Bobbin" (끄덕끄덕끄덕)	2022	Bobbin
"Hit the Bass"	2022	Win-Dow
"Macarena" (마카레나)	2023	Macarena
"Super Power"	2024	Lunch-Box
NPC DS (sub-unit)
"Creeper"	2025	Non-album single

=== Soundtrack appearances ===
Title	Year	Album
"Beautiful Day"	2022	Cherry Blossoms After Winter OST
"Show You"	2022	Beautiful Moment OST Pt.3
"You and Me Now"	2023	Sing my Crush OST

== Awards and nominations ==
Name of the award ceremony, year presented, award category, nominee(s) of the award, and the result of the nomination
Award ceremony	Year	Category	Nominee(s)	Result	Ref.
Asia Artist Awards	2021	Focus Award – Music	Blitzers	Won	
K-Global Heart Dream Awards	2022	K-Global Rising Star Award	Blitzers	Won	
