= Miyako Itō =

Japanese voice actress (born 1969)

- 伊東 みやこ
- Born: February 23, 1969 (age 57)
- Other name: Momoko Momoi
- Occupation: Voice actress
- Years active: 1989-present
- Height: 157 cm (5 ft 2 in)

Miyako Itō (伊東 みやこ, Itō Miyako; born February 23, 1969) is a Japanese voice actress.

== Filmography ==
=== Anime ===
List of voice performances in anime
Year	Title	Role	Notes	Source
1999–2000	Kyorochan	Kyorochan		
2000	Monster Rancher	Medaruna		
2001	Dennō Bōkenki Webdiver	Tsubasa Hara		
2001	Shaman King	Millie		
2001	Hikaru no Go	Hong Xiu Ying		
2002	Fortune Dogs	Pagubo		
2002	Pocket Monsters Advanced Generation	Hasubo, Hasuburero, Fushigidane, Yukiwarashi, Eipamu		
2003–04	Mermaid Melody: Pichi Pichi Pitch series	Hippo, Mami		
2003	Astro Boy	Marshmallow		
2004–05	Battle B-Daman series	Li Yong Fa		
2004–05	Kaiketsu Zorori	Baby, Aunty, Puppe, others		
2004	Hamtaro	Magiku		
2004	Viewtiful Joe	Mick		
2005	Immortal Grand Prix	Bella DiMarco		
2005	Kotencotenco	Kotenko, Matenko		
2006	Pokemon Diamond & Pearl	Goro, Pinpuku		
2006–07	Onegai My Melody: KuruKuru Shuffle!	Oyster-kun		
2006–07	Pururun~tsu! Shizuku-chan series	Shizuku-chan		
2007	Deltora Quest	Cree, Sunikku		
2008–11	Penguin no Mondai series	Kinoshita Beckham		
2008–09	Stitch! series	Piko		
2010	Katanagatari	Kirine Higa		
2010–11	Beyblade: Metal Fusion series	Chlorine Gracie	Metal Masters and Metal Fury	
2012	Kuromajo-san ga Toru!!	Cocoa, Lollipop		
2012	Pichi Pichi ♪ drop-chan	Shizuku-chan		
2014	Captain Earth	Hostess		
2015	Ushio and Tora	aunt		
2015	Snow White with the Red Hair	Kino		
	Anpanman	Inai Barun		
	Pokémon	Yogirasu, others		
2016	Natsume's Book of Friends	Awayuki		

=== Film ===
List of voice performances in film
Year	Title	Role	Notes	Source
2002	A Tree of Palme	Tejina		
2003	Go! Anpanman: The Amazing Nagenegiman and Princess Doremi	Big drum Man	short film	
2003	Pokémon: Jirachi Wish Maker	Faunsu Pokemon, Hasubo	Also Gotta Dance short	
2004	Pokémon: Destiny Deoxys	Ametama		
2005	Pokémon: Lucario and the Mystery of Mew	Manene		
2006	Pokémon Ranger and the Temple of the Sea	Eipamu		
2007	Pokémon: The Rise of Darkrai	Eipamu, Pinpuku		
2008	Pokémon: Giratina and the Sky Warrior	Pinpuku		
2009	Pokémon: Arceus and the Jewel of Life	Pinpuku		
2009	A Penguin's Troubles	Kinoshita Beckham		
2010	Pokémon: Zoroark: Master of Illusions	Pinpuku, Mojanbo		
2015	Pikachu and the Pokémon Music Squad	Panpujin	Pikachu short film preceding Hoopa and the Clash of Ages	

=== Video games ===
List of voice performances in video games
Year	Title	Role	Notes	Source
2002	Hikaru no Go-graduate student summit decisive battle -	HiroshiShigeruEi	PS1/PS2	
2006	Everybody's Tennis	Tennis Bow	PS1/PS2	
2010	Everybody's Tennis Portable	Tennis Bow	PSP	

=== Other dubbing ===
List of voice performances in overseas dubbing
Title	Role	Notes	Source
Tiny Toon Adventures			
Woody Woodpecker			
She's All That			
