= A Penguin's Troubles =

Japanese manga series

ペンギンの問題 (Penguin no Mondai)
- Genre: Comedy
- Manga
- Written by: Yūji Nagai
- Published by: Shogakukan
- Magazine: CoroCoro Comic
- Original run: July 15, 2006 – December 15, 2012
- Volumes: 15
- Anime television series

Penguin no Mondai
- Directed by: Jun Kamiya
- Music by: Shuhei Naruse
- Studio: Shogakukan Music & Digital Entertainment
- Original network: TV Tokyo (TNX)
- Original run: April 5, 2008 – March 27, 2010
- Episodes: 100
- Anime television series

Penguin no Mondai MAX
- Directed by: Jun Kamiya
- Studio: Shogakukan Music & Digital Entertainment
- Original network: TV Tokyo (TNX)
- Original run: April 3, 2010 – March 26, 2011
- Episodes: 50
- Anime television series

Penguin no Mondai DX?
- Directed by: Jun Kamiya
- Studio: Shogakukan Music & Digital Entertainment
- Original run: April 2, 2011 – March 31, 2012
- Episodes: 52
- Anime television series

Penguin no Mondai POW
- Directed by: Jun Kamiya
- Studio: Shogakukan Music & Digital Entertainment
- Original run: April 7, 2012 – March 30, 2013
- Episodes: 51
- Manga

Penguin no Mondai Plus
- Written by: Yūji Nagai
- Published by: Shogakukan
- Magazine: CoroCoro Comic
- Original run: February 2013 – November 2014
- Volumes: 4
- Video games
- Penguin no Mondai: Saikyou Penguin Densetsu! (2008); Penguin no Mondai X: Tenkuu no 7 Senshi (2009); Pen 1 Grand Prix: Penguin no Mondai Special (2009); Penguin no Mondai: The World (2010); Penguin no Mondai: The Wars (2011); Penguin no Mondai + Bakusho! Roulette Battle!! (2014)

A Penguin's Troubles (Japanese: ペンギンの問題; Penguin no Mondai) is a Japanese manga series created by Yūji Nagai. It follows a troubled penguin who attends the middle school, and likes to eat hamburgers and hot chips. It is published by Shogakukan and has been collated into 15 tankōbon volumes as of January 2013. It has been adapted into a televised anime series which airs on TV Tokyo and has also been adapted into a theatrical film.

== Characters ==
Beckham Kinoshita (木下ベッカム, Kinoshita Beckham)
Voiced by: Miyako Itō

the main protagonist of the series. His favorite food is hamburgers, although he also loves French fries, milkshakes and soft drinks. In many episodes he references Miracle Super Burgers. In another episode, since he can't buy the miraculous double superburger, he has a severe depression and has a phobia of hamburgers, although it ends up being a lie to give him free food, since to cure him, they had to give him many hamburgers, potatoes and vice versa. He lives in a house in the shape of his head, he is loved by Michael, although Beckham usually ignores him, unaware of his existence.

Naoto Yamada (山田なおと, Yamada Naoto)
Voiced by: Sachi Matsumoto

11-year-old boy who is in the fifth grade of Kirikabu Elementary School. He is one of the main characters in Penguin's Troubles and accompanies Beckham in his troubles. He has a crush on Yumi, though he doesn't want her to know. Beckham is always bothering him and messing with Yumi.

Yumi Matsui (松井ゆみ, Matsui Yumi)
Voiced by: Saori Gotō

Naoto's classmate and idol girl at Kirikabu Elementary School. She last name was revealed in the 25th episode of the long story. She looks like a normal girl, and she loves to fight. When it comes to battle, she changes her personality and she does the commentary. She's basically a common sense person, and she gets stupid sometimes.

Paul Okamoto (岡本ポール, Okamoto Paul)
Voiced by: Shinji Kawada

A classmate with a mohawk hair. He was the only one who scored 100 points in a fairly difficult test, so he was a candidate for the main character to replace the stupid Beckham. The mohawk on the head has many mysteries, such as transforming into various things, bread, telephones, and being worth 100,000 yen. Mohawk wears what he likes every time Gordon door-to-door sales. He was taciturn in his first appearance, but he speaks from Johnny's first appearance. The five Okamoto brothers are real brothers, and they were separated three years ago.

Michael Inoue (井上マイケル, Inoue Michael)
Voiced by: Chō

He is a squirrel. He loves Beckham and is obsessed with him, he appears many times with Beckham, throwing himself on him and saying some comment about how wonderful Beckham is.

Charlotte Takahashi (高橋シャルロット, Takahashi Charlotte)
Voiced by: Rikako Aikawa

She is a seventy four-year-old woman. On occasion, she also often appears as a monster.

Gordon Watanabe (渡辺ゴードン, Watanabe Gordon)
Voiced by: Kenta Miyake

He is a middle-aged man, he is naked, although he is never seen (many times he covers himself with sunflowers), whenever he appears, Naoto usually tells him not to show himself below the waist. On different occasions, he usually appears flying with fake wings.

Johnny Kobayashi (小林ジョニー, Kobayashi Johnny)
Voiced by: Toshiyuki Morikawa

he is a penguin, just like Beckham, and he usually fights with him using the slap but always loses.

Ronaldo Kinoshita (木下ロナウド, Kinoshita Ronaldo)
Voiced by: Rikako Aikawa

He's like a little brother to Beckham. The smallest. Before he came along, Beckham didn't know he had a brother.

Other Characters

Principal (校長先生, Kouchou)
Voiced by: Chō

The principal of Kirikabu Elementary School. he wears a wig He usually has a gentle personality that doesn't get angry when Beckham takes his wig, but he once got angry when his wig was soiled. He is trying to grow his hair out in the anime. He also often talks about wigs.

Matsuura (松浦先生, Matsuura-sensei)
Voiced by: Haruhi Nanao

A female teacher in charge of Class 1 of the 5th grade. she is 28 years old. She's basically natural. She is usually kind, but if she forgets to do her homework, she becomes fiendishly angry and becomes so powerful that she destroys the walls of her classroom with a single punch. she seems to be single

Arashiyama (嵐山先生, Arashiyama-sensei)
Voiced by: Tomoyuki Shimura

A strict physical education teacher whose eyes are very sharp when it comes to the inspection of belongings. A red jersey is a trademark. Her first person is "Arashiyama", and he says "This Arashiyama..." whenever possible. He lost to Beckham in the first episode. From the middle of the anime, he has a crush on Matsuura-sensei.

Schneider Mori (森シュナイダー, Mori Shunaidā)
Voiced by: Shinji Kawada

A man disguised as a courier part-timer. Because he was a model for Gordon, he had his hair cut bald by a barber. He then wore a wig, which he stole and threw away. Gordon tried to give him his hat, but he was disappointed because it was his pants. When he tried to help Beckham and Naoto who were in distress on a deserted island, he dropped his wig into the sea. In the anime, the position is different from the original, and like Michael, it is almost ignored. It is revealed in episode 95 that he is a wig, but the details are unknown (however, unlike the original, he seems not to be dissatisfied at all).

Dave Okamoto (岡本デイブ, Okamoto Dave)
Voiced by: Tomoyuki Shimura

eldest son. He is a purple penguin in a judo uniform and quite tall. His specialty is judo. In the anime version, "Degowasu" is a favorite phrase.

Brian Okamoto (岡本ブライアン, Okamoto Brian)
Voiced by: Shinji Kawada

second son. Green penguin with sunglasses. He wears a B mark necklace on his chest and a cloak on his back. he has a cool personality.

Alex Okamoto (岡本アレックス, Okamoto Alex)
Voiced by: Rikako Aikawa

Third son. A red penguin (orange in the anime version) wearing a hat on its head. He is good at making mecha. In the anime version, he likes eggplants.

Emily Okamoto (岡本エミリー, Okamoto Emily)
Voiced by: Haruhi Nanao

eldest daughter. She is the only female of the five siblings and a pink penguin. Features her twintails.

Chuck Okamoto (岡本チャック, Okamoto Chuck)
Voiced by: Saori Gotō

The youngest (fourth son). yellow penguin. He has his pacifier in his mouth. Despite being a baby, he has a very high IQ and can speak. "Deshu" is a favorite phrase.

Chris Yamaguchi (山口クリス, Yamaguchi Chris)
Voiced by: Ai Orikasa

A chicken. He practices flying in the riverbed. He has a comb. When he is in a pinch, he gathers up his strength and lays an egg with about 10 times the nutritional value of a normal chicken egg.

== Episodes ==
1. A Serious Announcement's Problem
2. A Problem of Classtime
3. A Problem of One Billion Yen
4. A Problem of an Old Tale
5. A Problem with Beckham's Family
6. A Problem with the Way Home from School
7. A Problem of a Rival (Part 1)
8. A Problem of a Rival (Part 2)
9. A Problem of Rotation
10. A Problem of Hide and Seek
11. A Problem of a Fieldtrip
12. A Problem of Lunch
13. A Problem of a Hero
14. A Problem of Bowling
15. A Problem of Escaping
16. A Problem of Toilets
17. A Problem of the Future
18. A Problem of Swimming
19. A Problem of Parting
20. A Problem of Time Slip
21. A Problem of 100 Ten
22. A Problem of School Attendance
23. A Problem of Bag Binding (Part 1)
24. A Problem of Bag Binding (Part 2)
25. A Problem of Home
26. A Problem of Final Monster
27. A Problem of Marathon
28. A Problem of Sneezing
29. A Problem of Picnic
30. A Problem of Help
31. A Problem of Masculinity
32. A Problem of Life
33. A Problem of Detective
34. A Problem of School Bag
35. A Problem of Candidate
36. A Problem of The Big Adventure
37. A Problem of Divination
38. A Problem of Samurai
39. A Problem of Hamburger
40. A Problem of Robot
41. A Problem of Transfer School
42. A Problem of Esper
43. A Problem of Maximum on The Ground
44. A Problem of Transformation
45. A Problem of Partner
46. A Problem of Lateness
47. A Problem of Soccer
48. A Problem of Magnet
49. A Problem of Barber
50. A Problem of Super Sorry
51. A Problem of Tulip
52. A Problem of Ouen
53. A Problem of Fake Beckham
