= Kotencotenco =

Japanese anime

こてんこてんこ (Kotenkotenko)
- Genre: Comedy, fantasy
- Manga
- Written by: Atsuko Ueno
- Published by: Kodansha
- Magazine: Tanoshi Yōchien
- Anime television series
- Directed by: Susumu Kudo
- Studio: IMOVE
- Original network: TV Tokyo, Animax
- Original run: 6 October 2005 – 28 September 2006
- Episodes: 52 (104 segments)

Kotencotenco (こてんこてんこ, Kotenkotenko) is a Japanese manga and anime series for young children by Atsuko Ueno. The anime was produced by NAS and TV Tokyo. Kotencotenco replaces the previous anime series: Onmyou Taisenki on the TV Tokyo Thursdays 06:00 pm – 06:30 pm slot.

== Story ==
Kotencotenco is a gag strip anime for especially younger children. Featuring the flourishes of the Prince of Heaven Kingdom, Kotenco. It's up to him and his friends to stop The Baron, and his cronies from stealing the Angel Stars for The Great Demon King, who is aiming to take over Heaven Kingdom. Kotenco is normally very kind, but will transform into Matenco, his trouble-making counterpart when in bad spirit. Matenco is transformed back into Kotenco when Pick calls upon The Queen to replace Matenco's halo.

== Characters ==
=== Heaven Kingdom ===
- Kotenco (こてんこ, Kotenko) - Voiced by: Miyako Itō

The main character of the anime, and the Prince of Heaven. Kotenco is usually a kind child with a good heart, but when faced with challenges too overwhelming, the light from his halo leaves- resulting into the transformation of Matenco, which Kotenco has no memory of once transforming back to himself. His favorite food is soft noodles.

- Matenco (まてんこ, Matenko) - Voiced by: Miyako Itō

The transformed counterpart of Kotenco. Unlike Kotenco, Matenco is mischievous and almost impossible to control when he becomes destructive. However, he will only listen to the words of Pick-chan. (To an extent.) Despite his roughhousing nature, it serves as an advantage for stopping The Baron's plans.

- The Queen (女王様, Joō sama) - Voiced by: Chiemi Ishimatsu

The motherly figure to Kotenco who rules over Heaven. The Queen is kind, and wishes the best for Kotenco. The secret of Matenco was entrusted to Pick-chan, as well as the communication ring used to call upon her. The Queen replaces Matenco's halo with a golden one, transforming him back into Kotenco after being alerted by Pick-chan.

- Mumu-san (むーむーさん, Mu - mu - san) - Voiced by: Masato Hijikata

Kotenco's teacher and main assistant to The Queen. He originally lived in the Ground Kingdom. Mumu is also known to make inventions. In the original story and OVA, his name was Aimu.

=== Kotenco's 6 older brothers ===
- Dawn (ドオン, Dōn) - Voiced by: Motoyuki Tsubaki

Kotenco's older brother who he looks up to the most. Dawn works closely with The Queen, and is able to engage in combat when he wants to. He often patrols the kingdom.

- Var (ヴァー, Vā) - Voiced by: Shintaro Ohata / Voiced by: Takashi Ohara (Episode 22 only)

Occasionally seen with Dawn, helping out on certain missions.

- Sera (セラ, Sera)
- Kevi (ケヴィ, Kevi)
- Fanny (ファニー, Fanī)
- Ru (ルー, Rū) - Voiced by: Mitsuki Saiga

A fallen brother of Kotenco that went missing some time ago. Ru was the one linked to creating the curse of Matenco, when Kotenco was born, under the Great Demon King's command. Ru enjoys being evil, but later on saves Kotenco and his friends.

=== Fairy Kingdom ===
- Pick / Pikku (ピック, Pikku) - Voiced by: Akane Ohmae

Kotenco's best friend, and the granddaughter of Choro. She's a strong willed, but kind fairy who cares deeply for Kotenco, Nappa, and even Matenco. Pick-chan dreams of becoming an idol, but is unfortunately extremely tone deaf. When Matenco is on the loose, she calls The Queen through her communicator ring to transform him back into Kotenco.

- Nappa (ナッパ, Nappa) - Voiced by: Fumie Nakanishi

Pick-chan's younger brother. He's a bit shy, and is also very good friends with Kotenco.

- Elder (長老, Chōrō) - Voiced by: Toshihiko Nakajima

The leader of the Fairy Kingdom, he is friends with The Queen and also knows the secret of Matenco.

=== Ground Kingdom ===
- The Baron (だんしゃく, Danshaku) - Voiced by: Kazuhiro Nakata

Under the orders of the Great Demon King, he is sent to steal the Angel Stars. Although Baron can be cunning with his plans, he's easily frazzled and can be the cause of his own downfall. Matenco sees Baron as his "playmate," and almost always sends Baron running off, empty handed. Baron is the leader of his two subordinates, Urusasinu & Nekoumori who he also lives with. While he can get annoyed by their incompetence, he deeply cares for them.

- Nekoumori (ねこうもり, Nekōmori) - Voiced by: Wasabi Mizuta

Nekoumori lives inside of The Baron's hat. His name is a combination of the Japanese words "cat" & "bat;" ねこ (neko) + こうもり(koumori) . Nekoumori is lazy and often sleeps when he wants, even refusing orders. His favorite food is Miso onigiri.

- Urusainu (うるさいぬ, Urusainu)- Voiced by: Keiji Himeno

A hyperactive dog, who is extremely loyal to The Baron. Urusainu repeats words usually 3 times in a row, and is reckless. His name is a combination of the Japanese words "noisy" & "dog;" うるさい (urusai) + いぬ (inu).

- Otaka-san (おたかさん, Otaka san)- Voiced by: Kei Hayami

The Baron's housekeeper. Otaka-san is very motherly and charitable, but also has a scary temper. In one episode, she develops an intense crush on Dawn and leaves to find him, leaving Baron & co starving unable to take care of themselves without her. In the original story, she was a spy sent by The Great Demon King to report back on Baron's activities.

- Kurikuri (くりくり, Kurikuri) - Voiced by: Fumie Ogura

Otaka-san's child. Kurikuri can only say his own name. In the original story, he was born from an Angel Star that fell into the Ground Kingdom.

- Great Demon King Agu (大魔王アグー, Dai maō Agū) - Voiced by: Hikaru Hanada

The ruler of the Ground Kingdom. He was originally a resident of Heaven, but because he had such an evil heart, he became fallen and banished. He is responsible for putting the curse of Matenco onto Kotenco, during Kotenco's birth. Baron is ordered to steal Angel Stars for him, but always fails, causing Agu to create earthquakes. Agu is bound to his throne, immobile until the very end of the series. In the author's original vision, he was intended to be redeemed.

== Database ==
=== Opening/Ending themes ===
- Opening: Let's Sing Together! (いっしょに唄おう!, Issho ni Utaō !) by Sae
  Ending: Stories of the Stars (星物語, Hoshi Monogatari) by Kawai Eri
  2nd Opening: Go, Go, Koten-Go! (ゆけゆけ こてんごう!, Yuke Yuke Koten-gō) by Tenkara-Mail
  2nd Ending: Kotenco Exercise (こてんこたいそう, Kotenko Taisō) by Tenkara-Mail

=== Episodes ===
No.	Title	Original release date
1	"Kotenko is Matenko?"; Transliteration: "Kotenko ga Matenko?" (Japanese: こてんこがまてんこ？)	6 October 2005
2	"Kotenko is the Future King!"; Transliteration: "Kotenko wa Mirai-no Ōsama !" (Japanese: こてんこは未来の王様！)	6 October 2005
3	"First Patrol"; Transliteration: "Hajimete no Patorōru" (Japanese: はじめてのパトロール)	13 October 2005
4	"Stars in the Sky are Everyone's Treasure"; Transliteration: "Ten-no Hoshi wa Minna no Takaramono" (Japanese: 天の星はみんなの宝物)	13 October 2005
5	"The Fairy Land is Full of Happiness"; Transliteration: "Tanoshisa Ippai Yōsei no Kuni" (Japanese: 楽しさいっぱい妖精の国)	20 October 2005
6	"Let's Clean Up!"; Transliteration: "Kirei ni Shimashō !" (Japanese: キレイにしましょう！)	20 October 2005
7	"High star cutting scissors Basami-kun"; Transliteration: "Takahoshi Kiri Basami kun Dai-tsuiseki" (Japanese: 高星切りバサミくん大ついせき)	27 October 2005
8	"Caught in the dandelion field" Transliteration: "Tanpopo-batake de Tsukamaete" (Japanese: タンポポ畑でつかまえて)	27 October 2005
9	"Big musical note castle commotion" Transliteration: "Onpu no Ohjoh wa Oh-sawagi" (Japanese: おんぷのお城は大さわぎ)	3 November 2005
10	"Pinch! Kotenco-go's round and round great operation" Transliteration: "Pinchi ! Koten-gō Guruguru Dai-sakusen" (Japanese: ピンチ！こてん号ぐるぐる大作戦)	3 November 2005
11	"Surprising! Multiplying mirror" Transliteration: "Bikkuri ! Fueru Mirā Dai-sakusen" (Japanese: びっくり！増えるミラー大作戦)	10 November 2005
12	"Bottle of memories" Transliteration: "Omoide no Ko-bin" (Japanese: おもいでの小ビン)	10 November 2005
13	"Soap bubble panic!" Transliteration: "Shabon-dama Panikku !" (Japanese: シャボン玉パニック！)	17 November 2005
14	"Super mysterious! Surprising picture book" Transliteration: "Chō Fushigi ! Bikkuri Ehon" (Japanese: チョー不思議！びっくり絵本)	17 November 2005
15	"Kotenco-chan, Don't Transform!"; Transliteration: "Kotenko-chan, Tenshin Shicha Dame !" (Japanese: こてんこちゃん、てんしんしちゃダメ！)	24 November 2005
16	"SOS! Rose Arch"; Transliteration: "Esu Oh Esu ! Bara no Aachi" (Japanese: SOS！バラのアーチ)	24 November 2005
17	"Chaos Under A Mask"; Transliteration: "Kamen o Kabutte Dai-konran" (Japanese: 仮面をかぶって大混乱)	1 December 2005
18	"Tiny Tiny Snowman"; Transliteration: "Chiisana Chiisana Yuki Daruma" (Japanese: 小さな小さな雪だるま)	1 December 2005
19	"Captain Cook Reporting!"; Transliteration: "Kyaputen Kokku Sanjō !" (Japanese: キャプテンコック参上！)	8 December 2005
20	"Friends Of Ground Kingdom"; Transliteration: "Chi no Kuni no Otomodachi" (Japanese: 地の国のおともだち)	8 December 2005
21	"Funny candy airship" Transliteration: "Okashina Okashi no Hikōsen" (Japanese: おかしなお菓子の飛行船)	15 December 2005
22	"Great storm! Protect the flowers!!" Transliteration: "Ō-arashi ! Kadan o Mamore !!" (Japanese: 大あらし！花だんを守れ！！)	15 December 2005
23	"Super Strong! Daruma-san Barrier"; Transliteration: "Chō-kyōryoku ! Daruma-san Baria" (Japanese: 超強力！ダルマさんバリア)	22 December 2005
24	"Super Matenco Reporting!"; Transliteration: "Sūpā Matenko Sanjō !" (Japanese: スーパーまてんこ参上！)	22 December 2005
25	"Challenging! A Riddle Tree"; Transliteration: "Chōsen! Nazonazo no Ki" (Japanese: ちょうせん！なぞなぞの木)	2 January 2006
26	"I'm Not Afraid Of Ghosts"; Transliteration: "Obake Nante Kowakunai" (Japanese: お化けなんて怖くない)	2 January 2006
27	"Urusainu Replaced By Kashikoinu!?"; Transliteration: "Urusa-inu Yori, Kashiko-inu !?" (Japanese: うるさいぬより、かしこいぬ!?)	5 January 2006
28	"The Sea Is Wide And Salty"; Transliteration: "Umi wa Hiroi na Shoppai na" (Japanese: 海はひろいなしょっぱいな)	5 January 2006
29	"Kotenco And A Magic Kettle?"; Transliteration: "Kotenko to Mahō no Yakan ?" (Japanese: こてんこと魔法のヤカン？)	12 January 2006
30	"The Queen's Lost Shoes"; Transliteration: "Ubawareta Jooh-sama no Kutsu" (Japanese: うばわれた女王様のくつ)	12 January 2006
31	"Combine! Big Punyorin"; Transliteration: "Gattai ! Deka Punyorin" (Japanese: 合体！デカぷにょりん)	19 January 2006
32	"Great Cleaning Battle!"; Transliteration: "Osōji Dai-sakusen !" (Japanese: おそうじ大決戦！)	19 January 2006
33	"The Magic Show Is Here"; Transliteration: "Majikkushō ga Yattekita" (Japanese: マジックショーがやってきた)	26 January 2006
34	"Decide! Ai-Chan Smash"; Transliteration: "Kimero! Ai-chan Sumasshu" (Japanese: 決めろ！アイちゃんスマッシュ)	26 January 2006
35	"Batten Ring"; Transliteration: "Batten Ringu" (Japanese: バッテンリング)	2 February 2006
36	"Speed UP! Step UP!"; Transliteration: "Supīdo Appu! Suteppu Appu !" (Japanese: スピードUP！ステップUP！)	2 February 2006
37	"Scaryyy, Uncle Kanshaku"; Transliteration: "Kowāi, Kanshaku Ojisan" (Japanese: こわ～い、カンシャクおじさん)	9 February 2006
38	"Invisible! The Secret of Nai-nai cape" Transliteration: "Miyabure ! Nainai Manto no Himitsu" (Japanese: 見破れ！ナイナイマントの秘密)	9 February 2006
39	"Mysterious Origami"; Transliteration: "Fushigi-na Origami" (Japanese: 不思議な折り紙)	16 February 2006
40	"Scoop! Ground Kingdom's Uncle At Work"; Transliteration: "Sukūpu ! Hataraku Chi no Kuni Ojisan" (Japanese: スクープ！はたらく地の国おじさん)	16 February 2006
41	"The Baron Gets Fired"; Transliteration: "Danshaku, Kubi ni Naru" (Japanese: だんしゃく、クビになる)	23 February 2006
42	"Kotenco, To Ground Kingdom"; Transliteration: "Kotenko, Chi no Kuni e" (Japanese: こてんこ、地の国へ)	23 February 2006
43	"Makeover! The Baron Is A Lovely Lady?"; Transliteration: "Dai-henshin ! Danshaku wa Suteki na Redī?" (Japanese: 大変身!だんしゃくは素敵なレディ?)	2 March 2006
44	"Nappa's Secret Base"; Transliteration: "Nappa no Himitsu Kichi" (Japanese: ナッパのひみつ基地)	2 March 2006
45	"Matenco, Don't"; Transliteration: "Matenko wa Dame yo" (Japanese: まてんこはダメよ)	9 March 2006
46	"Fallen Kotenco"; Transliteration: "Kotenko, Taoreru" (Japanese: こてんこ たおれる)	9 March 2006
47	"Pick-chan In Love"; Transliteration: "Koisuru Pikku-chan" (Japanese: 恋するピックちゃん)	16 March 2006
48	"Holy Spring Water Flower"; Transliteration: "Seinaru Izumi no Mizu no Hana" (Japanese: 聖なるいずみの水の花)	16 March 2006
49	"Castle Monster"; Transliteration: "Oshiro no Kaibutsu" (Japanese: お城の怪物)	23 March 2006
50	"Lying Is The Beginning Of Fish (?)"; Transliteration: "Usotsuki wa Osakana no Hajimari" (Japanese: ウソつきはおサカナのはじまり)	23 March 2006
51	"Lighting The Ground Kingdom Part 1"; Transliteration: "Chi no Kuni ni Hikari wo Zenpen" (Japanese: 地の国に光を 前編)	30 March 2006
52	"Lighting The Ground Kingdom Part 2"; Transliteration: "Chi no Kuni ni Hikari wo Kōhen" (Japanese: 地の国に光を 後編)	30 March 2006
53	"Let's Go On A Heart Throbbing Adventure!"; Transliteration: "Wakuwaku! Harō Suisei Dai-sekkin !" (Japanese: わくわく ハロー彗星大接近！)	6 April 2006
54	"Let's Go On A Heart Pounding Adventure!"; Transliteration: "Dokidoki Bouken ni Deyō !" (Japanese: どきどき 冒険に出よう！)	6 April 2006
55	"Operation Don't Fall Down!"; Transliteration: "Ochiru na Ochiru na Dai-sakusen!" (Japanese: 落ちるな落ちるな大作戦！)	13 April 2006
56	"Insect Fairy Baguu And The Amazing Song"; Transliteration: "Mushi no Yōsei Bagū to Sugoi Uta" (Japanese: 虫の妖精バグーとすごい歌)	13 April 2006
57	"The Rugged Kingdom Of Ice"; Transliteration: "Kōri no Kuni wa Kōri Gori" (Japanese: 氷の国はこおりごり)	20 April 2006
58	"Rescuing The Baron"; Transliteration: "Danshaku o Tasukete" (Japanese: だんしゃくを助けて)	20 April 2006
59	"Sleepless Nekoumori"; Transliteration: "Nemurenai Nekōmori" (Japanese: 眠れないねこうもり)	27 April 2006
60	"Nappa And Urusainu's Festive Night"; Transliteration: "Nappa to Urusainu, Omatsuri no Yoru ni" (Japanese: ナッパとうるさいぬ お祭りの夜に)	27 April 2006
61	"Ai-chan And The Forest's Seeds"; Transliteration: "Ai-chan to Mori no Tane" (Japanese: アイちゃんと森の種)	4 May 2006
62	"Kotenco And The Flying Whale"; Transliteration: "Kotenko to Sora Tobu Kujira" (Japanese: こてんこと空飛ぶクジラ)	4 May 2006
63	"Otaka-san Is Scary?"; Transliteration: "Otaka-san wa Kowai?" (Japanese: おたかさんは怖い？)	11 May 2006
64	"Kotenco's Errand"; Transliteration: "Kotenko no Otsukai" (Japanese: こてんこのおつかい)	11 May 2006
65	"Becoming Tiny!"; Transliteration: "Chitchaku Natchatta!" (Japanese: ちっちゃくなっちゃった!)	18 May 2006
66	"Tanchikin And Petendakku"; Transliteration: "Tanchikin to Petendakku" (Japanese: タンチキンとペテンダック)	18 May 2006
67	"Stardust Mountain Deathmatch"; Transliteration: "Hoshikuzu-yama no Desumacchi" (Japanese: 星くず山のデスマッチ)	25 May 2006
68	"Matenco Grand Prix"; Transliteration: "Matenko Guranpuri" (Japanese: まてんこグランプリ)	25 May 2006
69	"Riding hair! Big Beard And Eyebrow Wave!"; Transliteration: "Notte Mō! Hige to Mayuge no Bigguwēbu !" (Japanese: のって毛！ヒゲとマユゲのビッグウェーブ！)	1 June 2006
70	"Toy Feelings"; Transliteration: "Omocha no Kimochi" (Japanese: オモチャの気持ち)	1 June 2006
71	"Heavenly Star Prince"; Transliteration: "Ten no Hoshi no Ōji-sama" (Japanese: 天の星の王子さま)	8 June 2006
72	"Dreadful! The Baron's Performance"; Transliteration: "Zukkoke ! Danshaku Pafōmansu" (Japanese: ズッコケ！だんしゃくパフォーマンス)	8 June 2006
73	"Kotenco VS. Kotenco"; Transliteration: "Kotenko buiesu Kotenko" (Japanese: こてんこVS.こてんこ)	15 June 2006
74	"The Baron Is A Hero?"; Transliteration: "Danshaku ga Yūsha?" (Japanese: だんしゃくが勇者？)	15 June 2006
75	"The Cold Bagworm"; Transliteration: "Samugari no Minomushi" (Japanese: 寒がりのミノムシ)	22 June 2006
76	"Baron Catcher"; Transliteration: "Danshaku Kyacchā" (Japanese: だんしゃくキャッチャー)	22 June 2006
77	"The Spell Of Courage Maji Na-Nya"; Transliteration: "Yūki no Jumon wa Maji-nā-nya" (Japanese: 勇気の呪文はまじなーにゃ)	29 June 2006
78	"Kotenco Ninja Training"; Transliteration: "Kotenko Ninja Shugyou" (Japanese: こてんこ忍者修行)	29 June 2006
79	"Uproar In Zoo-Zoo Land"; Transliteration: "Zūzūrando wa Oh-sawagi" (Japanese: ズーズーランドは大騒ぎ)	6 July 2006
80	"Hot? Cold? Which is it?" Transliteration: "Atsui ? Samui ? Docchi-nano ?" (Japanese: あつい？さむい？どっちなの？)	6 July 2006
81	"The Rolling Misonigiri"; Transliteration: "Miso-nigiri de Suttonton" (Japanese: みそにぎりですっとんとん)	13 July 2006
82	"Teru Teru Kotenco, Exterminate The Rain Clouds"; Transliteration: "Teruteru Kotenko no Amagumo Taiji" (Japanese: てるてるこてんこの雨雲退治)	13 July 2006
83	"The Baron Is A Dad?!"; Transliteration: "Danshaku ga Papa!?" (Japanese: だんしゃくがパパ！？)	20 July 2006
84	"A Straight Line For Dawn-sama!"; Transliteration: "Dōn-sama Icchokusen!" (Japanese: ドオン様一直線！)	20 July 2006
85	"Now Open! Matenco's Big Circus"; Transliteration: "Kaisai ! Matenko Dai-sākasu" (Japanese: 開催！まてんこ大サーカス)	27 July 2006
86	"Kotenco Railway 5105"; Transliteration: "Kotenko Tetsudō Gō Ichi Zero Gō" (Japanese: こてんこ鉄道5105)	27 July 2006
87	"Straw Millionaire Kotenco!?"; Transliteration: "Warashibe Kotenko!?" (Japanese: わらしべこてんこ!?)	3 August 2006
88	"Fearful!? Legendary Dragon!"; Transliteration: "Kyōfu ?! Densetsu no Doragon !" (Japanese: 恐怖!?伝説のドラゴン！)	3 August 2006
89	"The Baron Eats The Heavenly Star"; Transliteration: "Danshaku, Ten no Hoshi o Taberu" (Japanese: だんしゃく、天の星を食べる)	10 August 2006
90	"Kotenco And The Surprising Bread Factory"; Transliteration: "Kotenko to Bikkuri Pan Kōjō" (Japanese: こてんことビックリパン工場)	10 August 2006
91	"Wild West Kotenco"; Transliteration: "Kōya no Kotenko" (Japanese: 荒野のこてんこ)	17 August 2006
92	"Grandpa Kotenco, Grandpa Matenco"; Transliteration: "Kotenko Jiisan Matenko Jiisan" (Japanese: こてんこじいさん、まてんこじいさん)	17 August 2006
93	"Kanshaku-san Again"; Transliteration: "Kanshaku-san Futatabi" (Japanese: カンシャクさん、再び)	24 August 2006
94	"Don't Wake Goodnight Volcano"; Transliteration: "Oyasumi Kazan o Okosanai de" (Japanese: おやすみ火山を起こさないで)	24 August 2006
95	"Final Mission!? Invading The Baron's Mansion!"; Transliteration: "Fainaru Misshon !? Danshaku-tei ni Sennyū Seyo !" (Japanese: ファイナルミッション！？だんしゃく邸に侵入せよ！)	31 August 2006
96	"The Baron's Victory? Kotenco And The Tower Of Tricks"; Transliteration: "Danshaku Shōri ? Kotenko to Karakuri no Tō" (Japanese: だんしゃく勝利？こてんことからくりの塔)	31 August 2006
97	"Showdown! Ghost Ship Captain!?"; Transliteration: "Taiketsu ! Yūrei Senchou !?" (Japanese: 対決！ゆうれい船長!?)	7 September 2006
98	"Lord Baron"; Transliteration: "Tonosama Danshaku" (Japanese: とのさまだんしゃく)	7 September 2006
99	"Dead Or Alive!? Hell Sugoroku"; Transliteration: "Deddo oa Aaraibu !? Jigoku Sugoroku" (Japanese: デッド オア アライブ!? 地獄すごろく)	14 September 2006
100	"Fierce Battle! Garbage Mansion"; Transliteration: "Gekitō ! Gomi Yashiki" (Japanese: 激闘！ ゴミ屋敷)	14 September 2006
101	"Kotenco, To Space"; Transliteration: "Kotenko, Uchū e Yuku" (Japanese: こてんこ、宇宙へゆく)	21 September 2006
102	"Rescue Furamin!"; Transliteration: "Furamin o Sukue!" (Japanese: フラミンを救え！)	21 September 2006
103	"Final Battle!? The Great Demon King Appears!"; Transliteration: "Saishū Kessen !? Daimaō Arawaru !" (Japanese: 最終決戦!?大魔王現る!)	28 September 2006
104	"The Grand Finale! Bringing Happiness!"; Transliteration: "Dai-dan'en ! Shiawase o Todoke ni !" (Japanese: 大団円!幸せを届けに!)	28 September 2006

== Video game ==
A minigame collection called Atama de DO! Kotencotenco (アタマでDO! こてんこてんこ, Atama de do! Kotenkotenko) was made by Dorasu for the Nintendo DS and released on 29 March 2007 in Japan.

== CDs ==
3 CDs were released in 2005 and 2006. 2 featured the 1st and 2nd intros and outros, along with karaoke tracks. The 3rd CD was released as a soundtrack / drama CD, featuring background music from the anime, and 3 stories.

== Traffic Safety OVA ==
A traffic safety OVA called Anime de tanoshiku manabu kotsu anzen tenshi no Kotenkotenko (アニメで楽しく学ぶ交通安全 天使のこてんこてんこ, Fun Traffic Safety Learning Anime: Angel Kotencotenco) meant to teach young children about traffic safety, and was released before the anime's broadcast.
