= Afronitaaa =

Ghanaian dance artist and choreographer

- Born: Accra, Ghana
- Occupations: Dance artist, choreographer
- Career
- Dances: Hip-hop dance, Afro Dance

Danita Akosua Adomaah Yeboah known professionally as Afronita stylized Afronitaaa is a Ghanaian dance artist, choreographer and co-founder of the AfroStar Kids Academy. In May 2024 she participated with her dance partner at the time Abigail as they appeared on the 17th series of Britain's Got Talent, where they finished third place.

== Early life and education ==
Afronitaaa was born in Accra, Ghana, and graduated from the University of Ghana Business School with a Bachelors of Science degree.

== Dance career ==
She started her dance career with Dance With A Purpose Academy (DWP) a Ghanaian dance academy that was co-founder by dancer Dancegod Lloyd, Afrobeats & Quables. In 2024 she exited the DWP academy and went on to create her own dance academy called AfroStar Kids Academy.

In May 2024 she participated in the 17th series of Britain's Got Talent with her dance partner Abigail who was the season 14 winner of TV3 Talented Kidz. Abigail who was her dance partner on British Got Talent had a hearing impairment. Afronitaaa and Abigail made it to the finals of the show and eventually placed third.

== Awards and nomination ==
Year	Award	Category	Result
2023	Pulse Influencer Award	Most Influential Actor/Actress of the Year	Won
