= Sydnie Christmas =

English singer, actress (born 1995)

- Born: 18 July 1995 (age 31); Gravesend, Kent, England
- Genre: Pop
- Occupations: Singer; Actress
- Instruments: Vocals
- Years active: 2016–present

Sydnie Christmas (born 18 July 1995) is an English singer and actress. After beginning a career in musical theatre and appearing in various productions, she went on to win the seventeenth series of Britain's Got Talent in 2024.

== Life and career ==
Christmas was born in Gravesend in Kent and studied at the D&B Academy of Performing Arts. After graduating in 2014, she went on to make her stage debut in the Kings Cross Theatre production of the jukebox musical Lazarus. She later went on to perform on cruise ships including Independence of the Seas and Quantum of the Seas where she appeared in productions including Grease and Starlight Express. From 2020 to spring 2023 she was at Starlight Express in Bochum, Germany, first as ″swing″ (responsible for understudying multiple ensemble tracks and being able to replace several cast members), later playing Carrie the Luggage Car. She also appeared in Stage School and took a zero-hour contract at a local gym.

After finding that her career was struggling, she auditioned for the seventeenth series of Britain's Got Talent. At her audition, which was broadcast in 2024, she sang "Tomorrow" from the musical Annie after which she received the Golden Buzzer from Amanda Holden and advanced straight to the semi-finals. Christmas sang Paul Anka's "My Way" in the third semi-final, which she won with 37.9% of the public vote. She was the bookies' clear favourite in the final, despite "fix claims" regarding her previous professional experience. She closed the show, singing "Over the Rainbow" from The Wizard of Oz, and was subsequently declared the winner with 27.2% of the vote.

== Filmography ==
As herself
Year	Title	Role	Ref.
2016–2017	Stage School	Participant; 6 episodes	
2024	Britain's Got Talent	Winner; series 17	
2024	Lorraine	Guest; 1 episode	
2024	This Morning	Guest; 1 episode Correspondent; 1 episode	

=== Stage ===
Year	Title	Role	Venue	Ref.
2016–2017	Lazarus	Teenage Girl #3	King's Cross Theatre, London	
2024-2025	Sleeping Beauty (Pantomime)	Fairy Christmas	Orchard West, Dartford	
2025	101 Dalmatians	Cruella de Vil	Hammersmith Apollo, London	

== Discography ==
=== Singles ===
Title	Year	Album
"Heal Me"	2020	Non-album singles
"One Night Only" (with DeFreyne)	2020	Non-album singles
"Run"	2026	Non-album singles
"Lean on You"	2026	Non-album singles

Preceded by Viggo Venn	Winner of Britain's Got Talent; 2024	Succeeded by
