= Viggo Venn =

Norwegian comedian

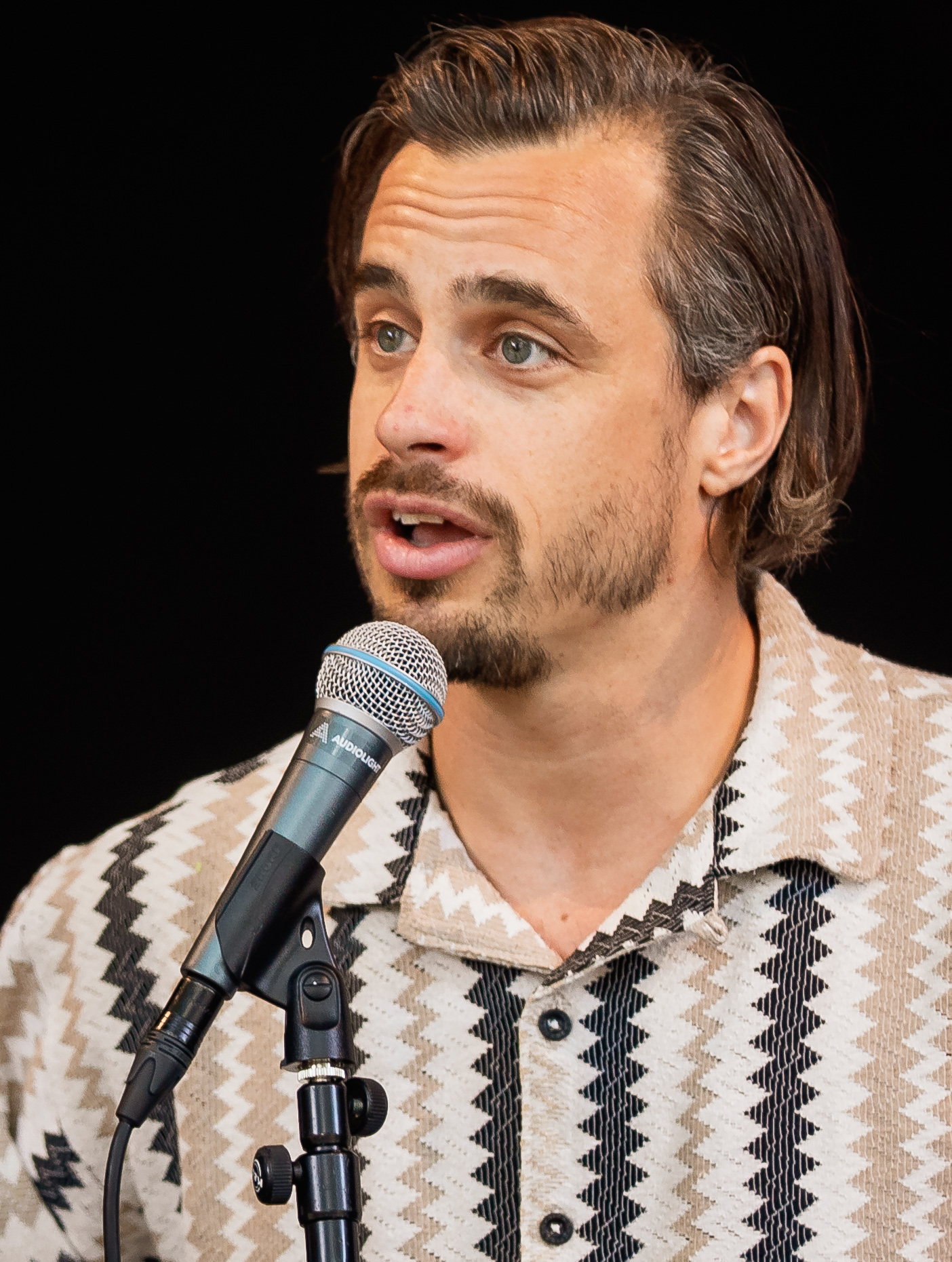
- Venn performing at Christians Kjeller, Kongsberg 2025
- Born: 22 March 1989 (age 37); Kongsberg, Norway
- Education: École Philippe Gaulier
- Notable work: Britain's Got Talent Winner Das Supertalent Finalist
- Website: https://viggovenn.com/

Viggo Venn (born 22 March 1989 in Kongsberg) is a Norwegian comedian who won the sixteenth series of the ITV talent show Britain's Got Talent in 2023.

== Biography ==
Venn studied economics in Norway. He then trained at the French clown school École Philippe Gaulier, studying under master-clown Philippe Gaulier. For four years he toured in a double act "Zach and Viggo" with American comedian Zach Zucker. The duo won the Best Comedy award at the 2016 Brighton Fringe for their show Zach and Viggo: Thunderflop. The following year, Thunderflop won a Weekly award for Best Comedy at the Adelaide Fringe, and Venn was once again nominated for the Best Comedy award at the Brighton Fringe with his solo show "The Life of Pepito". In 2018, The Life of Pepito was nominated for Best Comedy at the Perth Fringe World.

In 2022, Venn won the NATYS: New Acts of the Year Show in London and was runner-up in the Leicester Square Theatre's "New Comedian of the Year". In addition, Venn co-created Clownts, a competitive clown show, with John-Luke Roberts, Julia Masli and Sami Abu Wardeh.

In 2023, Venn auditioned for the sixteenth series of Britain's Got Talent. His act entailed humorous skits featuring him wearing multiple layers of high-visibility clothing and then proceeding to take them off one-by-one, appearing as if he was wearing limitless high vis vests. Whilst appearing on This Morning, Venn mentioned he suffered from a repetitive strain injury to his elbow as a result of the constant stripping of the high-viz vests. During the same interview, Venn stated that he had partnered with Britain's largest high-visibility clothing company. After winning the series on 4 June 2023, he received a £250,000 prize and the opportunity to perform at the Royal Variety Performance at the Royal Albert Hall. In 2025, he participated in the German Supertalent and received the Golden Buzzer from Dieter Bohlen. He finished in the top 10 in the final.

Preceded by Axel Blake	Winner of Britain's Got Talent; 2023	Succeeded by Sydnie Christmas
