= Sami Abu Wardeh =

- سامي ابو وردة
- Abu Wardeh in 2026
- Born: March 1986 (age 40); Kuwait
- Years active: 2019–present

Sami Abu Wardeh (Arabic: سامي ابو وردة; born March 1986) is a Kuwait-born character comedian, writer and actor. He is known for his live comedy shows Bedu (2022) and Palestine: Peace de Resistance (2025), which he performed at the Edinburgh Fringe Festival.

== Early life ==
Abu Wardeh was born in Kuwait to a Palestinian Bedouin father and a Liverpool-born mother of Irish Catholic parentage. Through his mother, Abu Wardeh is a British citizen by birth. Abu Wardeh was displaced from Kuwait by the Gulf War as a child and moved around growing up, living in nearly 20 places. He began his medicine studies at a UK university in 2004.

== Career ==
In 2021, Abu Wardeh started working with the comedy duo Marina and Maddy, also known as Siblings. The pair recruited him for a joint show titled Sami & Siblings at their 2022 Brighton Fringe return.

Abu Wardeh made his solo debut with his comedy show Bedu at the 2022 Edinburgh Fringe Festival. Abu Wardeh described his comedy style as "character clowning", embodying a series of characters throughout the set, starting with a Palestinian refugee. Brian Logan of The Guardian named Bedu one of the 10 best comedy shows of 2022. In addition, Abu-Wardeh co-created the show Clownts, a competitive clown show, with Julia Masli, John-Luke Roberts and Viggo Venn. Abu Wardeh won the set. Since 2022, Abu Wardeh has regularly participated in Arabs Are Not Funny!, a recurring comedy night.

The following year, Abu Wardeh created and starred in the five-part Channel 4 digital sitcom The Sheikh, a satire about a wealthy Sheikh expatriating in Britain. As a playwright, Abu Wardeh contributed to Cutting the Tightrope: The Divorce of Politics from Art, a 2024 collection of short plays written in response to censorship surrounding Palestine in the arts.

Abu Wardeh returned to the 2025 Edinburgh Fringe with his second solo comedy show Palestine: Peace de Resistance, which he described as "an hour of jokes, storytelling and clowning based on the history of anticolonial resistance". The absurdist show follows a 1960s Palestinian character Merguez who meets an Algerian woman. Palestine: Peace de Resistance won the Heart Award at the Besties Awards and was shortlisted for Neurodiverse Review's ADHD Comedy Award. Also at the Fringe in addition to dates in Newcastle and Glasgow, Abu Wardeh joined the line-up of Palestine Stands Up with Alaa Shehada, Diana Sweity and Hanna Shammas.

At the 2026 Fringe, Abu Wardeh shifted away from character comedy to more straightforward standup with the show Sami Abu Wardeh Hates You.
