= Shizuku-chan =

Japanese book and television series

しずくちゃん
- Genre: Surreal comedy
- Anime television series

Pururun! Shizuku-chan
- Directed by: Atsushi Yano
- Produced by: Akiko Odawara; Shinsaku Hatta; Hiroto Kumegai; Takuya Yokoyama
- Written by: Hiroyuki Onoda
- Music by: Koichiro Kameyama
- Studio: TMS Entertainment
- Original network: TXN (TV Tokyo)
- Original run: October 7, 2006 – September 29, 2007
- Episodes: 51
- Anime television series

Pururun! Shizuku-chan Aha
- Directed by: Atsushi Yano
- Produced by: Akiko Odawara; Shinsaku Hatta; Hiroto Kumegai; Takuya Yokoyama
- Written by: Hiroyuki Onoda
- Music by: Koichiro Kameyama
- Studio: TMS Entertainment
- Original network: TXN (TV Tokyo)
- Original run: October 7, 2007 – September 28, 2008
- Episodes: 51
- Anime television series

Picchipichi Shizuku-chan
- Directed by: Kazumi Nonaka
- Produced by: Yuichi Yasushi, Kenjirō Okada
- Written by: Yoshiyuki Suga, Akemi Igarashi, Koichi Taki
- Music by: Koichiro Kameyama
- Studio: Asahi Production; Yoonif E&C (eps 1–16); K's CRAFT (eps 17–52)
- Original network: Chiba TV, Sun Television, TV Kanagawa, Kids Station
- Original run: October 6, 2012 – September 28, 2013
- Episodes: 52

Shizuku-chan (しずくちゃん) is a Japanese children's illustrated book series created by Q-LiA and illustrated by Ritsuko Gibo, which started in 2003. An anime adaptation, Pururun! Shizuku-chan, was produced by TMS Entertainment and debuted on TV Tokyo on October 7, 2006. A second season called Pururun! Shizuku chan Aha debuted one year later in 2007.

A second series, Picchipichi Shizuku-chan, ran from October 2012 to September 2013. It was produced by Asahi Production and was broadcast on three Japanese Association of Independent Television Stations members and Kids Station.

A spinoff manga, NiJiRo Fairy Shizuku-chan, started in 2019. This manga transforms the cast into humans and puts them in new stories.

== Plot ==
The series revolves around a playful young child named Shizuku-chan. He, alongside his schoolmates, friends, and family lives a life of dangerous adventures in the Shizuku Forest.

== Characters ==
- Shizuku (しずくちゃん): The main character of the series. Being a raindrop sprite, Shizuku was born as a drop from rain for a cloud. He is named after his home, the Shizuku Forest. Rain fills Shizuku with happiness, causing rainbows to originate from his forehead. Shizuku is Japanese for "a drop of rain" which revolves around his birth. His birthday is on April 29. In NiJiro Fairy Shizuku-chan, he wears a sailor suit with a brooch that like an his face before he transform human and he has blue hair. Voiced by: Miyako Ito
- Uruoi (うるおいちゃん): The female main character of the series. She is the pink lemonade sprite in some manga, but is originally the skin lotion sprite of the Shizuku Forest. She is one of Shizuku's closest friends. She has a crush on her friend, Shizuku which is proven throughout the series (such as Shizuku freezing within ice and could have only been thawed by being kissed from only Uruoi alone). She wears a bow on her head. Being fashionable, she and her family run and live in the Department Store of Shizuku Forest. In NiJiRo Fairy Shizuku-chan, She has pink hair and wear one-piece dress. Voiced by: Ryoka Yuzuki
- Mirumiru (Milmil) (みるみるちゃん): The youngest of Shizuku's friends. He is a milk sprite who, unlike an infant, carries a large amount of strength. He is also known to outgrow his older friend, Shizuku. He wears a bib with the word "milk" printed on it. He and his family run and live in the Milk Store of Shizuku Forest. Because he's very little, he only says "nyu" ("latte" in the Italian dub.). In NiJiRo Fairy Shizuku-chan, he wear baby clothes with bib with depictions "MILK". Voiced by: Sayaka Narita
- Hanatare (はなたれ君): He is a nasal-mucus sprite.
- Hanaji (はなぢ君): He is a nosebleed sprite. In NiJiRo Fairy Shizuku-chan, He wear Red parka. Voiced by: Rikako Aikawa
- Aseo (アセオ君): A fat young yellow sweat sprite. He is known to overeat and to have the ability to sweat buckets. Among many, his most favorite food is curry. He and his family lives in and runs the Sauna of the Shizuku Forest. Voiced by: Yasuhiko Kawazu
- Namida (なみだ君): He is a tears sprite. Passionate and very weepy. He runs Sports-gym with an athlete. Voiced by: Makoto Ishii
- Elder Sister Shampoo & Elder Sister Rinse (シャンプー姉さん&リンス姉さん) They are a Shampoo & Rinse sprite, respectively. They are twins and Uruoi-Chan's elder sisters. They both run a beauty salon.
- Dororon (どろろん): The prankster of Shizuku-chan's friends but they still love him. Being a mischievous mud-sprite, he is known to fling mud at his pranking victims. Voiced by: Rie Ichita
- Midoriko (みどりこさん): The green sister of the Tea Sprites. She, alongside her sisters, runs and lives in the "Cafe-Drop" of the Shizuku Forest. She is the tea maker and server of the Cafe. She is known to be very polite yet have a strange personality. She wears a flower on her hair and drinking tea creates a long stick-like substance on her forehead. She fights with naginata. Voiced by: Naomi Shindou
- Longlong (ロンロン): The brown sister of the Tea Sprites. She carries much power and ability. She fights with nunchucks. Voiced by: Akiko Yajima
- Letty (レティ): The red sister of the Tea Sprites. She cooks the food of the Shizuku Forest's Cafe. She fights with frying pans.
- Colon (コロン君): The Eau-de-Cologne Sprite. He is very attractive to women, making him the "pretty and handsome boy" of Shizuku Forest.
- Mineo (ミネ夫君): He is a mineral water sprite.
- Honey (ハニーちゃん): She is a Honey syrup sprite.
- Yodare (ヨダレ君): He is a slobber sprite.
- Aroma (アロマさん) He is an Aroma-oil sprite.
- Ponshu (ポンシュさん) He is a Sake sprite and an Enka singer.
- Monsieur-Vino(ヴィーノ氏): He is a red wine sprite. He has swirled left eye and twinkle in the other, a bow, and hat.
- Rosé (ロゼちゃん) She is a Rosé wine sprite. Monsieur-Vino & Madam-Blanche's daughter. Voiced by: Momoko Saito
- Madam-Blanche (マダム・ブランシュ) She is a white wine sprite.
- Tsumurin (つむりん): One of Shizuku-chan's best friends. He is a snail, but has many shells that can be removed and replaced. In NiJiRo Fairy Shizuku-chan, He wear uniform with blue nectar and have tactile sense in head.Voiced by: Masashito Yabe
- Ametarou (雨太郎): Shizuku-chan's father. Voiced by: Takeharu Onishi
- Rainy (レイニー): Shizuku-chan's mother. Voiced by: Yuko Kobayashi
- Miku-chan (ミクちゃん): A human girl introduced in Picchipichi Shizuku-chan. who visits Shizuku-chan's world from Earth. She very bigger than Shizuku.
- Tollino (トリーノ): He is Rosé's pet little bird. but in the Pururun! Shizuku chan Aha, he is Vino family's old friend.
- Luna (ルナ): She is a ghost who wishes to live more. She meets Namida and become friends.
- Noir (ノアール): A mysterious merchant who gave Shizuku a suspicious space seed.
- Rabi (ラビ): A rabbit doll with devil inside. Tsumurin make eye contact with him under the moon and devil take over him.

== Media ==
Merchandise based on Pururun! Shizuku-chan! includes CDs such as Shizuku no Mori kara Konnichi wa, released on November 22, 2006, and a second one on January 24, 2007, named Shizuku no Mori no Ongakukai Purun!. A picture book that carries both CDs was released on February 21, 2007, and a second was released on March 28, 2007. A third CD was released on April 18, 2007. The fifth and sixth were released on April 18, 2007.

There were three games released for the Nintendo DS, one for Pururun! Shizuku-chan and two more for Pururun! Shizuku-chan Aha!. Additionally, Sega released various toys based on the series.
