= Tonikaku Akarui Yasumura =

Japanese comedian (born 1982)

- とにかく明るい安村
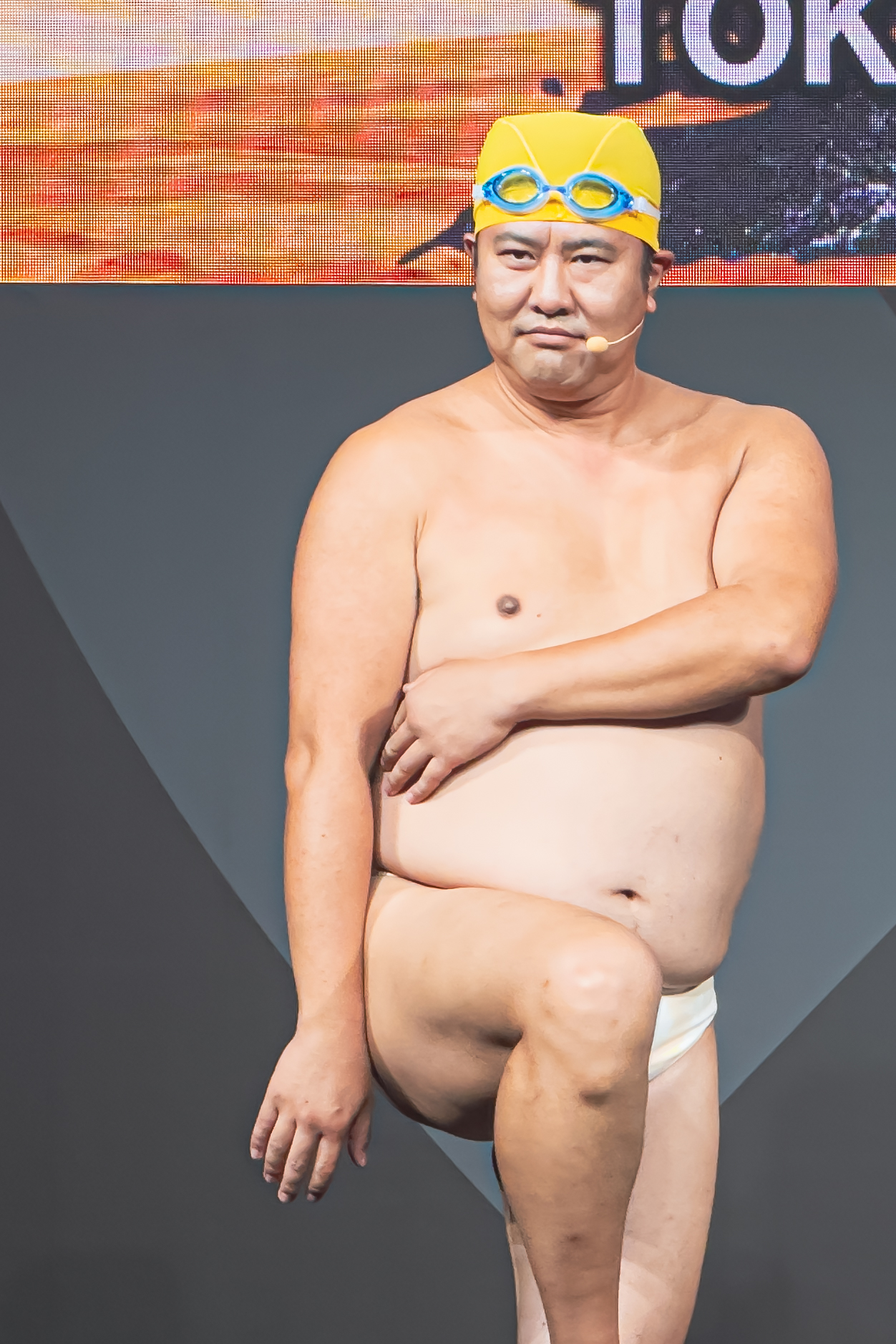
- Tonikaku Akarui Yasumura performing at Tokyo Game Show 2023
- Born: Shōgō Yasumura; March 15, 1982 (age 44); Asahikawa, Hokkaido, Japan
- Occupation: Comedian
- Years active: 2000–present
- Agent: Yoshimoto Creative Agency
- Height: 1.77 m (5 ft 10 in)
- Website: profile.yoshimoto.co.jp/talent/detail?id=428

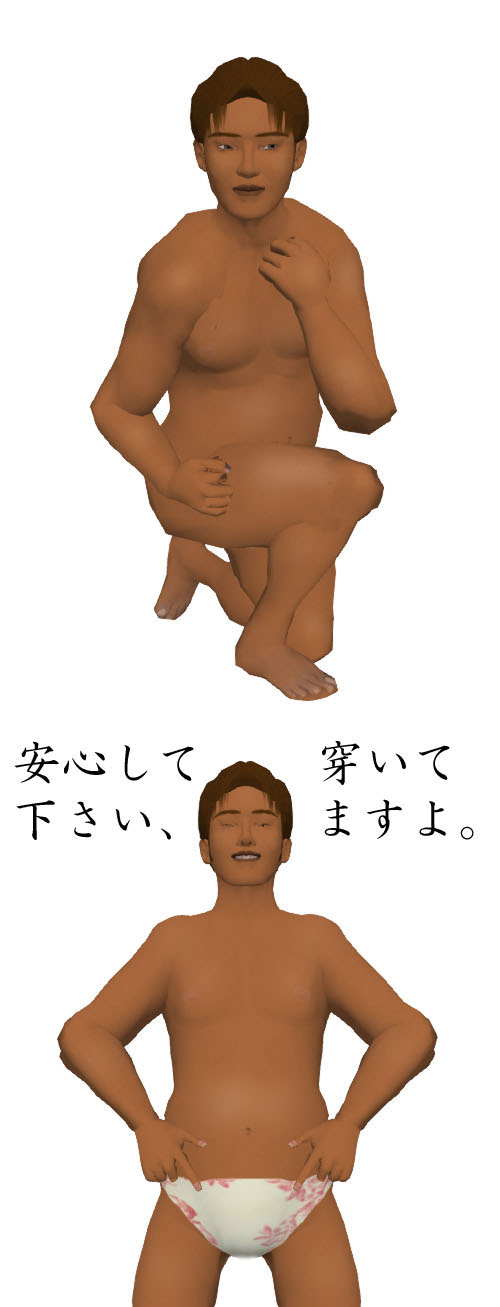
Example of Yasumura's nude pose

Shōgō Yasumura (安村 昇剛, Yasumura Shōgō; born March 15, 1982), better known as Tonikaku Akarui Yasumura (とにかく明るい安村, lit. 'Yasumura the Very Cheerful Person') or 'Tony' Yasumura, is a Japanese comedian who is represented by the talent agency, Yoshimoto Creative Agency. He was a former member of Armstrong. He graduated from Tokyo NSC 6th generation.

Yasumura graduated from Asahikawa Business High School.

== Britain's Got Talent ==
In 2023, Yasumura appeared on the 16th series of British talent competition Britain's Got Talent. He was eliminated in the semi-final after achieving second place with 18.3% of the public vote, but was brought back in the final as the judges' wildcard. He got 2.9% of the public vote in the final, making him 11th (last) place.

== Filmography ==
=== TV series ===
| Year | Title | Network | Notes |
|---|---|---|---|
| 2014 | Ameagari Kesshi-tai no Tōku Bangumi Ametō̄ku! | TV Asahi | |
| 2014 | High Noon TV Viking! | Fuji TV | |
| 2014 | All That's Manzai | MBS | MVP |
| 2015 | Sanma no Manma | KTV, Fuji TV | |
| 2015 | Downtown no Gaki no Tsukai ya Arahende!! | NTV | |
| 2015 | Sakurai Ariyoshi Abunai Yakai | TBS | |
| 2015 | Guruguru Ninety-Nine | NTV | |
| 2015 | Hamachanga | NTV | |
| 2015 | Ariyoshi no Kabe | NTV | Mr. Kabe |
| 2015 | AKBingo! | NTV | |
| 2023 | Britain's Got Talent (series 16) | ITV | Finalist |
| 2023 | La France a un incroyable talent (series 18) | M6 | |
| 2024 | America's Got Talent | NBC | Quarter-finals |

=== Radio series ===
| Year | Title | Network | Notes |
|---|---|---|---|
| 2015 | Tonikaku Akarui Yasumura to Mana Sakura no Tonikaku Maruhadaka! | NCB | |

=== Live shows ===
| Title | Notes |
|---|---|
| Satoshi Mukai to Hosome to Debu | |
| Hyper Japan 2024 | |

=== Movie ===
| Year | Title | Role |
|---|---|---|
| 2015 | Crayon Shin-chan: Fast Asleep! The Great Assault on Dreamy World! | Himself |

=== Advertisements ===
| Year | Title | Notes | Ref. |
|---|---|---|---|
| 2015 | Otoko Tower | Web limited ad | |
| 2015 | Crooz "Elemenal Story" | | |
| 2015 | CBC Radio Wide FM "FM Hairimasu yo Campaign" | | |

=== Other ===
| Year | Title | Notes | Ref. |
|---|---|---|---|
| 2015 | Yumemiru Adolescence "Summer Nude Adolescence" First Edition jacket | | |
