= Haruhi Nanao =

Japanese voice actress (born 1973)

- 七緒 はるひ
- Born: Haruhi Terada; February 11, 1973 (age 53); Tokyo, Japan
- Education: Seijo University
- Occupations: Voice actress; singer
- Years active: 1997–present
- Agent: 81 Produce
- Height: 156 cm (5 ft 1 in)
- Parent: Yojiro Terada

Haruhi Nanao (七緒 はるひ, Nanao Haruhi; born February 11, 1973) is a Japanese voice actress and singer who was born in Tokyo. She is employed by 81 Produce. She formerly went by the name Haruhi Terada (寺田 はるひ, Terada Haruhi).

When her father Yojiro Terada and her mother divorced in 2014, Haruhi changed her surname to her mother's maiden name.

== Filmography ==
=== Anime television ===
1998

- Beast Wars II: Super Life-Form Transformers – Navichan
- Ojarumaru – Arisa, Hifumi, Hoshino's Mama (third voice), Kaminariakane, Kintarou's Mama, Komachi Mama, Ojarumaru's Mother, Ushiko
- Super Express Hikarian – Anna Michi, Dojiras (second voice), Fuji, Hitachi Green, Thunderbird, Tsubasa (second voice)

1999

- Digimon Adventure – Pumpkinmon
- Elf-ban Kakyūsei – Ai's Mother
- Great Teacher Onizuka – Momoi
- Kindaichi Case Files – Shigure Asagi (Ep. 101)

2000

- Hamtaro – Daisy, Flora
- One Piece – Pepper
- Kindaichi Case Files – Yuko Sakamoto
- Gensomaden Saiyuki – Qiuhua (Ep. 19)
- Yu-Gi-Oh! Duel Monsters – Mai Kujaku

2001

- Digimon Tamers – Ai
- Shiawase Sou no Okojo-san – Narrator
- Soreike! Anpanman – Bikubiku-chan
- Fruits Basket – Kana Sohma, Kisa's Mother
- The Prince of Tennis – Yūki Akutsu

2002

- One Piece – Dip
- Tokyo Underground – Ruri Sarasa
- Digimon Frontier – Calmaramon, Ranamon
- Full Moon o Sagashite – Sasaki
- Bomberman Jetters – Rui, Hiroshi

2003

- Ashita no Nadja – Madam Reinhardt
- Ikki Tousen – Kaku Bunwa
- Galaxy Angel AA – Harry's Wife
- Konjiki no Gash Bell!! – Djem, Kazu, Waifu, Yun
- Saiyuki Reload – Minto (Ep. 13)

2004

- Naruto – Tsunade (young)
- Kyo Kara Maoh! – Nina
- Legendz: Tale of the Dragon Kings – Chiagall
- Monster – Izzy
- R.O.D the TV – Haruhi's Manager (Ep. 10)
- Samurai 7 – Shika (Eps. 11, 17, 26)
- Tenjho Tenge – Emi Isuzu
- Zoids: Fuzors – Lillin

2005

- Futari wa Pretty Cure Max Heart – Hikaru Kujo, Nonomiya
- Amaenaide yo!! – Sakura Sugai
- Elemental Gelade – Eve
- Fushigiboshi no Futagohime – Camellia, Mrs. Butterfly, Nalro
- Glass Mask – Namie Tamura; Ragneid; Sugiko Yamashita
- Hell Girl – Ryoko's Mother (Ep. 2)

2006

- Wan Wan Celeb Soreyuke! Tetsunoshin – Victora, Kaoruko Inuyama
- Amaenaide yo!! Katsu!! – Sakura Sugai
- Yume Tsukai – Yūko Aomori (Ep. 3)
- Air Gear – Ikki (young)
- Yoake Mae yori Ruriiro na: Crescent Love – Haruhi Takamizawa
- Fushigiboshi no Futagohime Gyu! – Camellia
- Digimon Savers – Piyomon
- Shōnen Onmyōji – Tatsuki, Utsugi
- Ghost Hunt – Noriko Morishita
- Kiba – Morina
- Red Garden – Kate's Mother

2007

- Gintama – Ofusa (Eps. 51–52)
- Tengen Toppa Gurren Lagann – Cybela Coutaud
- Deltora Quest – Sharn

2008

- A Penguin's Troubles – Matsura
- Minami-ke ~Okawari~ – Miss Kumada
- Rosario + Vampire – Kasumi Aono
- Rosario + Vampire Capu2 – Kasumi Aono

2009

- Detective Conan – Kaoru Hayashi
- Crayon Shin-chan – Midori Ishizaka (second voice)
- Minami-ke: Okaeri – Miss Kumada
- Naruto Shippuden – Rin Nohara, Tsunade (young)
- Ristorante Paradiso – Olga
- Welcome to Irabu's Office – Mrs. Ikeyama (Ep. 5)

2010

- A Penguin's Troubles Max – Matsuura

2011

- Bakugan Battle Brawlers: Gundalian Invaders – Fabia Sheen
- C – Control – The Money and Soul of Possibility – Hanabi's Mother
- Cross Fight B-Daman – Kakeru's Mother
- A Penguin's Troubles DX? – Matsuura
- Mitsudomoe Zōryōchū! – Ms. Kaieda

2012

- Detective Conan – Sumika Konno

2013

- Fate/kaleid liner Prisma Illya – Sella
- Minami-ke: Tadaima – Miss Kumada

2014

- Ai Tenchi Muyo! – Ayeka Masaki Jurai
- Dragonar Academy – Angela Cornwell
- Fate/kaleid liner Prisma Illya 2wei – Sella
- Fate/stay night: Unlimited Blade Works – Sella
- Future Card Buddyfight – Halberd Dragon, Hanae Jūmonji, Kyōya Gaen, Ryōmi Mikado, Stella Watson, Suzumi Mikadō

2015

- Kamisama Hajimemashita @ – Kirihito's Mother (Ep. 4)
- Shōnen Hollywood -Holly Stage for 50- – Saori Kazehara
- Hibike! Euphonium – Akiko Ōmae
- Future Card Buddyfight 100 – Ryōmi Mikado, Stella Watson
- Detective Conan – Mitsuru Mamiya

2016

- Future Card Buddyfight Triple D – Hanae Jūmonji, Ryōmi Mikado
- Fate/kaleid liner Prisma Illya 3rei!! – Sella

2018

- Saiyuki Reload Blast – Rei

2020

- Plunderer – Greengrocer Lady / Avsayette Vremya

2025

- Reincarnated as a Neglected Noble: Raising My Baby Brother with Memories from My Past Life – Rottenmeyer

=== Theatrical animation ===
- Digimon Frontier: Island of Lost Digimon – Ranamon
- Gurren Lagann the Movie – The Lights in the Sky Are Stars – Cybela Coutaud
- Naruto the Movie 3: Guardians of the Crescent Moon Kingdom – Karenbana
- Naruto Shippuden the Movie: The Will of Fire – Rin Nohara

=== Dubbing ===
==== Live-action ====
- 24 – Carla Matheson (Tracy Middendorf), Meredith Reed (Jennifer Westfeldt)
- The Brothers Grimm – Greta
- Buffy the Vampire Slayer – Dawn Summers (Michelle Trachtenberg)
- Bully – Claudia (Nathalie Paulding)
- The Chef – Beatrice
- College Road Trip – Trey Porter
- Cooties – Lucy McCormick (Alison Pill)
- Date Movie – Betty Jones (Marie Matiko)
- Deck the Halls – Ashley Hall
- Drop Dead Diva – Stacy Barrett (April Bowlby)
- Episodes – Carol Rance (Kathleen Rose Perkins)
- The Fast and the Furious – Gimel
- Gone Girl – Ellen Abbott (Missi Pyle)
- Like Mike – Reg Stevens (Brenda Song)
- The Lookout – Luvlee Lemons (Isla Fisher)
- Merlin's Apprentice – Brianna (Meghan Ory)
- Nikita – Leela Kantaria (Kathleen Munroe)
- Prom Night – Donna Keppel (Brittany Snow)
- The Reef – Kate (Zoe Naylor)
- Rizzoli & Isles – Courtney Brown (Andrea Bogart)
- See No Evil – Kira Vanning (Samantha Noble)
- Skyline – Candice (Brittany Daniel)
- Vacation – Audrey Griswold-Crandall (Leslie Mann)
- The Way, Way Back – Joan (Amanda Peet)
- Wild Things: Diamonds in the Rough – Jenny Bellamy (Claire Coffee)
- Y Tu Mamá También – Cecilia Huerta (María Aura)

==== Animation ====
- Baby Looney Tunes – Baby Melissa
- Invader Zim – Gaz Membrane
- Jimmy Neutron: Boy Genius – Britney
- Kick Buttowski: Suburban Daredevil – Jackie "Wacky" Wackerman

=== Video games ===
- The King of Fighters XIV – Angel
- Digimon ReArise – NoblePumpkinmon
