= Britain's Got Talent =

Televised British talent competition

- Genre: Talent show
- Created by: Simon Cowell
- Based on: America's Got Talent by Simon Cowell
- Directed by: Jonathan Bullen
- Presented by: Ant & Dec
- Judges: Simon Cowell; Amanda Holden; Piers Morgan; David Hasselhoff; Michael McIntyre; Alesha Dixon; David Walliams; Bruno Tonioli; KSI
- Voices of: Peter Dickson
- Country of origin: United Kingdom
- Original language: English
- No. of series: 19
- No. of episodes: 277 (list of episodes)

Production
- Executive producers: Nigel Hall; Lee McNicholas; Amelia Brown; Richard Holloway
- Producers: Simon Cowell; Matt Banks; Charlie Irwin; Paul Jones
- Production locations: Auditions: Various; Live shows: The Fountain Studios (2007–2016); Elstree Studios (2017); Hammersmith Apollo (2018–2020; 2022–present)
- Running time: 60–165 minutes
- Production companies: Syco Entertainment (2007–2025) (Note: Credited as SYCOtv from 2007 to 2012); Talkback Thames (2007–2011; 2025–present); Thames (2012–2024)

Original release
- Network: ITV
- Release: 9 June 2007 – present

Related
- Britain's Got Talent: The Champions

Britain's Got Talent (often abbreviated to BGT) is a televised British talent show competition, and part of the global Got Talent franchise created by Simon Cowell. Presented by Anthony McPartlin and Declan Donnelly (popularly known as Ant & Dec), it is produced by Talkback Thames (Thames from 2012 to 2024) and Syco Entertainment (until 2025), distributed by Fremantle, and broadcast on ITV every year (except 2021) in late Spring to early Summer. The show was originally intended for production in 2005, but filming was delayed after the intended host, Paul O'Grady, stepped down. Following the success of America's Got Talent that year, production resumed, and the programme eventually premiered on 9 June 2007.

The show is broadcast on ITV1 in the UK and Virgin Media One in the Republic of Ireland.

Every year, contestants of any age can audition for the televised contest with whatever talent they wish to demonstrate. During auditions, participants seek to impress a panel of judges – presently consisting of Cowell, Amanda Holden, Alesha Dixon, and KSI – in order to secure a place in the live rounds of the contest. Once in the live rounds, participants seek to impress the public and judges to secure votes, in order to reach the final and a chance to win a cash prize and a place within that year's performances for the Royal Variety Performance before members of the British royal family. As of 2026, the show has had 19 winners, ranging from musicians and singers to variety acts, magicians, dancers, and comedians.

On average, each series of Britain's Got Talent draws viewing figures of 6 to 10 million viewers. The show's live final in the third series attracted a record 17.3 million viewers, obtaining a 64.6% audience share at the time of its broadcast. Each series of the main programme is accompanied by a sister show, Britain's Got More Talent, presented by Stephen Mulhern. Until June 2019, the programme was aired on ITV2, but has since been moved to online platforms. A spin-off featuring the same judges and hosts, titled Britain's Got Talent: The Champions, was later produced and broadcast in 2019 following the success of the American edition's spin-off America's Got Talent: The Champions. Britain's Got Talent is contracted to run until 2028.

== History ==
The show's format was devised by X Factor creator and Sony Music executive Simon Cowell, who was involved in the creation of other Got Talent programmes across several different countries. He was inspired by popular British variety talent shows Opportunity Knocks (1949–1990) and New Faces (1973–1988). To showcase his idea, a pilot episode was filmed in September 2005, with the judging panel consisting of Cowell, Fern Britton (at the time, presenter of This Morning), as well as tabloid journalist Piers Morgan. The pilot was not broadcast on television until it was shown as part of a documentary series, titled The Talent Show Story, in January 2012.

The original plan for the show was for it to be aired within 2005–2006 (before the broadcast of America's Got Talent), with Paul O'Grady presenting the programme under the title Paul O'Grady's Got Talent, after having hosted the pilot. However, complications arose following the move of O'Grady's teatime show to Channel 4. ITV declined to allow O'Grady to rent their studios, prompting him to refuse all future work for the network. In a 2010 interview, O'Grady commented about the row by stating:

"I did the pilot for Britain's Got Talent – which was originally going to be called Paul O'Grady's Got Talent. But I told the producers they were having a joke if they thought I would front a show with that title. The original panel of judges was going to be Simon Cowell, Fern Britton and Piers Morgan. I was the host. Then when I had the row with ITV I was banned from the studios. I remember I rang Simon and told him he had a huge hit on his hands, but there was no way I could do it. I said, if I am banned I have to be banned from everything. I can't be a hypocrite and come in and do this. I had to bow out."

On 12 February 2007, following the success of America's Got Talent the previous year, ITV announced their intentions for a British series of Got Talent. Their announcement revealed changes to the original plan for the programme, with Ant & Dec revealed to be the hosts for the new programme. While Cowell remained as part of the judging panel, the new plan intended for David Hasselhoff and Cheryl Cole. However, both resigned before the programme was due to air, leading to Morgan being part of the panel as originally planned, and actress Amanda Holden joining him and Cowell as a judge; Hasselhoff would later join the panel for the programme's fifth series after being a part of the panel for America's Got Talent, while Cowell later employed Cole to be a replacement for Sharon Osbourne on The X Factor. At the same time, the broadcaster also announced that the show would be accompanied by a sister show on ITV2, titled Britain's Got More Talent, with Stephen Mulhern as its presenter.

== Format ==
=== Auditions ===
Each year's competition begins with two rounds of auditions. The first round, referred to as "open auditions", are held across several different cities around the UK during the Autumn months, within small venues that are attended by the producers. The second round, referred to as the "Judges' Auditions", are held the following year during January and February, within a select set of cities (these have commonly included Cardiff, Glasgow, Manchester, Birmingham and London). They take place within a theatre or convention hall, whose venue is chosen primarily for having the necessary facilities for handling large volumes of contestants. The venue is arranged into three zones consisting of a waiting area for participants, the wings where they enter and leave, and the main stage area that they perform on. The second round's name is due to the fact that these auditions are attended to by the judges, along with an audience who secure tickets to attend these sessions.

Each participant that seeks to enter that year's competition must first submit an application to the programme, containing information about who is performing – whether a single person, a pair or trio of performers, and a small or large group – personal details regarding age, hometown and background, what experience they have for their talent, and the nature of the act that will be performed. Eligibility for the contest is determined by what information is submitted for researchers to double-check, such information is required, per the programme's terms and conditions. Once an application is approved, the participant conducts a performance during an open audition close to where they reside (or can reach), whereupon if successful, they will be allocated a place in the second round, and at a venue that they can reach without issue. Once they arrive at the venue they are assigned to, the participant is then given a number, and remains within the venue's designated waiting area until called into the wings to prepare to perform. Once brought onto the main stage, they begin by engaging with the judges, asking a few small questions (subjects can include their name, background and nature of their performance) – whereupon they are given three minutes to conduct their performance. A backing track for their act is allowed if required.

A performance ends when either the time is up, or all the judges use their buzzers. Each judge has one that they can use to signal their dislike of the performance if they believe it to be unconvincing, boring or completely unacceptable for the contest (although a buzzer can be retracted if the judge felt they used it mistakenly, such as if the participant's performance did something unexpected that changed their opinion of them). Once a performance is over, each judge will give an overview of what they thought about the act, before casting a vote. If the contestant(s) receives a majority vote of "Yes", they then proceed onto the next stage in the contest, otherwise they are eliminated at that point from the competition. Beginning with the eighth series, judges can also grant an automatic place in the live rounds through the use of the "Golden Buzzer" situated on their panel's desk (a feature first introduced on Germany's Got Talent), which can be used by any of the judges for a participant whose audition was exceptional in their opinion, regardless of the views of the others. It may only be used twice by each judge, and cannot be used again for any other participants yet to audition in that year's competition. The hosts of Britain's Got Talent may also press the Golden Buzzer for a participant, but could only use it once. In 2023, Bruno broke the rules and pressed his a second time. This was allowed to stand, and ever since it has been unclear how many times it can be used with each subsequent series having judges use multiple each.

Filming for each series begins during the Judges' Auditions, and always consists of recording taken from each venue of auditions and backstage scenes within the wings and waiting area. Footage taken by production staff is then edited into a series of episodes consisting of montages of scenes from multiple venues, consisting of the most notable auditions (the best, worst and funniest made) – along with interviews with some of the notable participants that auditioned, and recorded backstage scenes of the hosts overseeing the performances from the wings.

From Series 8 onwards, alongside the introduction of the "Golden Buzzer", contestants are no longer required to wear an ID sticker.

=== Judges' decisions ===
This stage takes place after the auditions have been completed, and is also referred to as Deliberation Day, in which the judges look through the acts that have successfully made it to this stage, and begin whittling them down to those who would stand a fair chance in the live semi-finals. The amount that goes through has varied over the show's history, though usually consists of a number that can be divided equally over the semi-finals being held in a series. Once the judges have decided on who will go through, all contestants that have reached this stage are called back to discover if they will progress into the live semi-finals or not. After this has been done, the acts are divided up between the semi-finals that the series will have; usually eight in each series, except for the sixth to tenth series which had nine acts per semi-final. While in Series 1–13 the acts are called to the theatre to find out if they made it through, in season 14 the successful acts received a phone call from the judges and from season 15 onwards, the acts finding out their result is no longer televised.

For the fifth series, some acts were asked to perform again, as the judges had had difficulty coming to a final decision on the semi-finalist, and thus needed to see their performance again in order to make up their minds; it is the only time in the show's history that this has happened, and has not been repeated since.

=== Semi-finals and Final ===
Contestants who make it into the semi-finals by passing both stages of auditions (or receiving a Golden Buzzer, as of series 8), are divided into groups for each round, where they must perform before the audience and judges, as well as on live television. As with the audition stage, each semi-finalist must conduct a performance before the judges – a new routine of their act – with the judges' role being to watch what is conducted and give feedback towards the end of the performance. Buzzers may still be used by each judge, and the performance can be ultimately terminated if all buzzers are used. Because all semi-finalists are performing live, they are given time to prepare in advance with rehearsals, while production staff can provide assistance to those in preparing their performance. In the case of those conducting routines that incorporate a level of risk, precautions are put in place, including paramedics and sometimes set up off-site venues for performances to use – either live or for a pre-recorded film for the episode's live broadcast.

Each semi-final can only have two participants advance into the final, and these are determined by two votes. The first is public phone-in vote (via a special phone-number), in which the last two digits correspond to each semi-finalist, that takes place once all semi-finalists have performed and during a break in the semi-final to allow for votes to be made. Once the vote period is ended and the results counted and fully verified, the semi-finalist with the highest total of votes is announced as the winner of the semi-final and secures their place in the final. In 2025, they brought in the Live Show Golden Buzzer, which is where a different judge every show gets chosen to press it and can only be pressed once per show. If the judge does not press it, the decision reverts to the public vote. If the Golden Buzzer is pressed the contestant advances straight to the Live Final. In addition to these votes, semi-finalists can also secure a place in the finals if chosen as a "Wildcard". Introduced in the sixth series, the format allows the judges to choose any eliminated semi-finalist to be appointed as their Wildcard in the finals, through a private vote conducted once the semi-finals are completed. The result of this vote is announced prior to the final's broadcast. The format was later expanded to allow for a Wildcard to be chosen by the public from any eliminated semi-finalist they liked in the ninth and tenth series respectively, though this format was dropped before the eleventh series. For the eleventh series, the judges vote was removed and all of the finalists from the semi-finals were chosen by the public, with the top two participants in the public vote advancing to the final. Following criticism over the format change, the judges vote was reinstated for the following series. From Series 18, the golden buzzer was added to the semi-finals. In each show, one judge had control of the golden buzzer and could award it to one act at any point in the show, sending them straight through to the final. The public would then vote from the remaining acts, with the winner of that vote also going through the final.

The finals operate in a similar manner to the semi-finals, though all participants in this stage compete primarily to win votes from the public with either a new routine, or on some occasions, an enhanced version of their original audition performance. The judges can still buzz and give opinions on the performance they view, but have little impact on the public's voting intention. Once the public vote has been completed (once all finalists have performed and the votes verified and counted), the hosts announce who is placed as the top two acts of the vote, before revealing the winner who received the most votes from the public. The winner receives a cash prize, and a place in the Royal Variety Performance later that year.

For the show's scheduling, the live episodes are usually arranged to take place over the course of a week, semi-finals for each weekday, and the live final aired on either the Saturday or Sunday of the weekend. Exceptions to this were in both the seventh and eighth series, the live final aired a week after the semi-finals had been completed, and in the fourteenth series, where due to the COVID-19 pandemic, the semi-final episodes were all pre-recorded and aired weekly on Saturday nights, with the live final following a week after the semi-finals had finished. In the first three series, the live semi-finals were aired as single 90 minute editions featuring both performances and results whilst the live final (apart from the first series) was shown in two parts, the first part featured the live performances from the finalists with the results announced in a separate broadcast later that evening. From series four until series thirteen, the semi-finals were altered and adopted the two show format featuring a 90 minute performance episode and a half-hour results episode, with another ITV programme, usually an episode of Coronation Street, airing in between whilst the public vote took place. The live final during this period (apart from the fifth series) was merged into a single bumper edition, often running for around two and a half hours. Beginning from the third series, guest performers appeared on the show to give a performance; from the following series, when the semi-finals adopted the two show format, the results episode always featured a guest performer slot before the voting closed. In series fourteen, when the semi-finals aired weekly, each semi-final episode aired as a single two-hour edition. For the fifteenth series, the semi-finals returned to being shown live across a single week, but maintained the single two-hour episode format from the previous series. From Series 18, the semi-finals were again broadcast weekly on Saturday nights.

Until the tenth series, live episodes were broadcast from The Fountain Studios in Wembley, the same site used for The X Factor. Following its closure in 2016, the show relocated its live episodes to Elstree Studios in 2017, before moving to Hammersmith Apollo from the following year, apart from 2020.

== Judges and presenters ==
For the first 4 series after the show began in June 2007, the judging panel consisted of music executive and television producer Simon Cowell, television personality and actress Amanda Holden, and newspaper editor and tabloid journalist Piers Morgan. In 2009, the producers made plans to alter the show's format to allow for a fourth judge when the third series was set to begin, with plans for Kelly Brook to be the new judge on the panel. Less than a week after the series began, this change was dropped on the belief that this alteration to the show's format would complicate it, resulting in Brook being credited as a guest judge for that series. In 2010, Cowell fell ill during filming of the fourth series and was unable to attend the Birmingham auditions, leading to Louis Walsh stepping in as a guest judge in his place until he recovered.

In 2011, the panel saw its first major change, when Morgan revealed he was leaving the show to travel to America and begin filming of his new show. After Cowell announced he wouldn't be present for the fifth series' auditions due to his busy schedule with launching The X Factor USA, the panel was replaced with comedian Michael McIntyre and former America's Got Talent judge David Hasselhoff, to join Holden during the auditions. Walsh returned as a guest judge for the London auditions, due to Hasselhoff's commitments with a pantomime at that time. When the series entered its live episodes, Cowell returned to oversee the acts as a fourth judge. In October 2011, both Hasselhoff and McIntyre declined to return for the sixth series, while Cowell announced he was returning full-time to the show.

On 2 January 2012, the producers revealed its decision to adopt the use of a fourth judge for the programme's format again, announcing that both Cowell and Holden would now be joined by David Walliams and Alesha Dixon for the sixth series (with the latter moving to the talent show after deciding to leave BBC's Strictly Come Dancing). During filming in February, Holden was unable to attend the London auditions, due to having given birth to her daughter at that time which had led to her suffering some after-effects from her pregnancy. As a result, American actress and model Carmen Electra served as a guest judge. In subsequent series, the line-up remained as Cowell, Holden, Walliams and Dixon. No further incidents occurred except for the eighth series in 2014 when Cowell missed the first day of the Manchester auditions, leading to Ant & Dec filling in for him. He was also absent for the final day of the London auditions. In the tenth series in 2016, Cowell was late for an audition, and was temporarily replaced by Walliams' mother Kathleen (who was in attendance that day). In September, October and December 2020, Cowell was absent from the series 14 live rounds and the Christmas Spectacular, following an accident that left him recovering from a back injury. He was replaced in these episodes by Ashley Banjo.

In 2022, it was reported that Walliams would be leaving the show after ten series. In 2023, it was announced that Bruno Tonioli would replace Walliams. In July 2025, it was announced that Tonioli was set to quit and would not be returning for the 2026 series due to schedule conflicts. On 1 September 2025, KSI was officially confirmed as a full time judge replacing Tonioli due to his scheduling conflicts.

=== Overview ===
Colour key

Host
Judge
Guest judge
Contestant

| Cast member | Series | | | | | | | | | | | | | | | | | | | |
| Cast member | 1 2007 | 2 2008 | 3 2009 | 4 2010 | 5 2011 | 6 2012 | 7 2013 | 8 2014 | 9 2015 | 10 2016 | 11 2017 | 12 2018 | 13 2019 | 14 2020 | 15 2022 | 16 2023 | 17 2024 | 18 2025 | 19 2026 | 20 2027 |
Hosts
| Ant McPartlin | ● | ● | ● | ● | ● | ● | ● | ● | ● | ● | ● | ● | ● | ● | ● | ● | ● | ● | ● | ● |
| Declan Donnelly | ● | ● | ● | ● | ● | ● | ● | ● | ● | ● | ● | ● | ● | ● | ● | ● | ● | ● | ● | ● |
Judges
| Simon Cowell (Note: Cowell was not present for auditions in the fifth series due to overseas commitments; he served as a judge for the live shows only.) | ● | ● | ● | ● | ● | ● | ● | ● | ● | ● | ● | ● | ● | ● | ● | ● | ● | ● | ● | ● |
| Amanda Holden | ● | ● | ● | ● | ● | ● | ● | ● | ● | ● | ● | ● | ● | ● | ● | ● | ● | ● | ● | ● |
| Piers Morgan | ● | ● | ● | ● | | | | | | | | | | | | | | | | |
| Michael McIntyre | | | | | ● | | | | | | | | | | | | | | | |
| David Hasselhoff | | | | | ● | | | | | | | | | | | | | | | |
| Alesha Dixon | | | | | | ● | ● | ● | ● | ● | ● | ● | ● | ● | ● | ● | ● | ● | ● | ● |
| David Walliams | | | | | | ● | ● | ● | ● | ● | ● | ● | ● | ● | ● | | | | | |
| Bruno Tonioli | | | | | | | | | | | | | | | | ● | ● | ● | | |
| KSI (Note: Bruno Tonioli missed some days of the Blackpool auditions in the eighteenth series due to commitments with Dancing with the Stars so KSI stood in for him during these days. Simon Cowell missed a day of the Blackpool auditions due to the unexpected death of former colleague Liam Payne, with KSI returning for an additional day to stand in for him.) | | | | | | | | | | | | | | | | | | ● | ● | ● |
Guest Judges
| Kelly Brook (Note: Brook was initially intended as a fourth judge, before producers relegated her to being a guest judge.) | | | ● | | | | | | | | | | | | | | | | | |
| Louis Walsh (Note: Due to Hasselhoff's schedule during filming of the auditions, Louis Walsh stepped in as a guest judge for the sessions he could not attend. Louis Walsh previously stepped in when Cowell was absent due to illness.) | | | | ● | ● | | | | | | | | | | | | | | | |
| Carmen Electra (Note: Electra stood in for Amanda Holden for the London audition rounds during the sixth series due to her pregnancy.) | | | | | | ● | | | | | | | | | | | | | | |
| Kathleen Williams (Note: Cowell arrived late for the London auditions on 23 January - David Walliams's mother, Kathleen Williams, who was attending these, stood in for him for a number of auditions until he arrived.) | | | | | | | | | | ● | | | | | | | | | | |
| Ashley Banjo (Note: Cowell was forced to miss the live shows for the fourteenth series due to a back injury; Banjo stood in for him during these rounds.) | | | ● | | | | | | | | | | | ● | | | | | | |
| Stacey Solomon (Note: Cowell missed a day of the Birmingham auditions in the nineteenth series as he was feeling unwell, Solomon stepped in as guest judge.) | | | | | | | | | | | | | | | | | | | ● | |
| Bradley Walsh (Note: Cowell was absent from the first half of the Blackpool audtions due to recovering from his back operation, Bradley Walsh stepped in as a guest judge.) | | | | | | | | | | | | | | | | | | | | ● |

=== Judges ===
Simon Cowell
(2007–present)

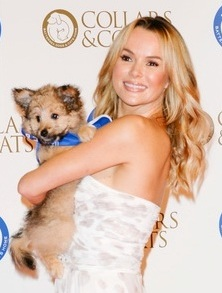
Amanda Holden
(2007–present)

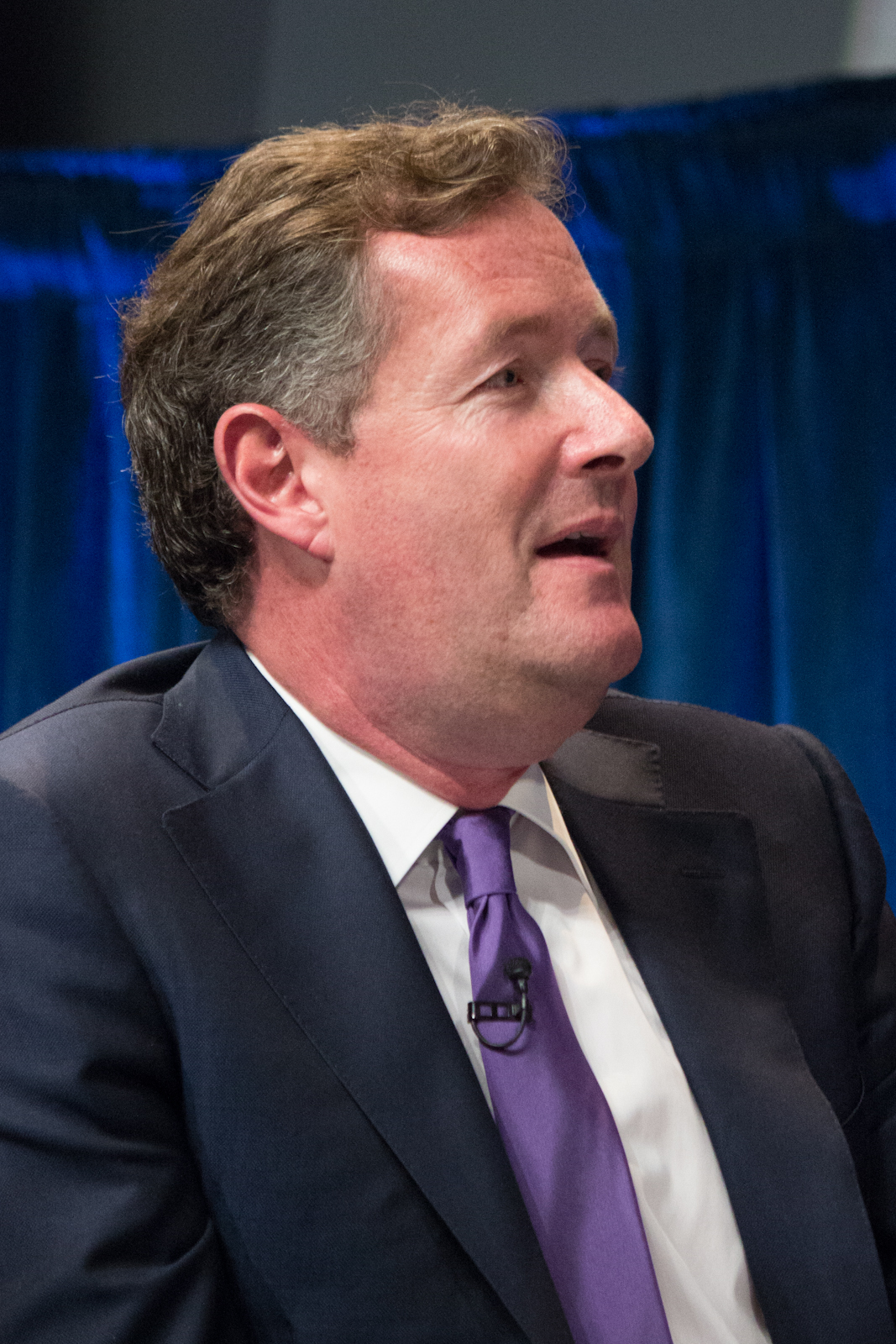
Piers Morgan
(2007–2010)

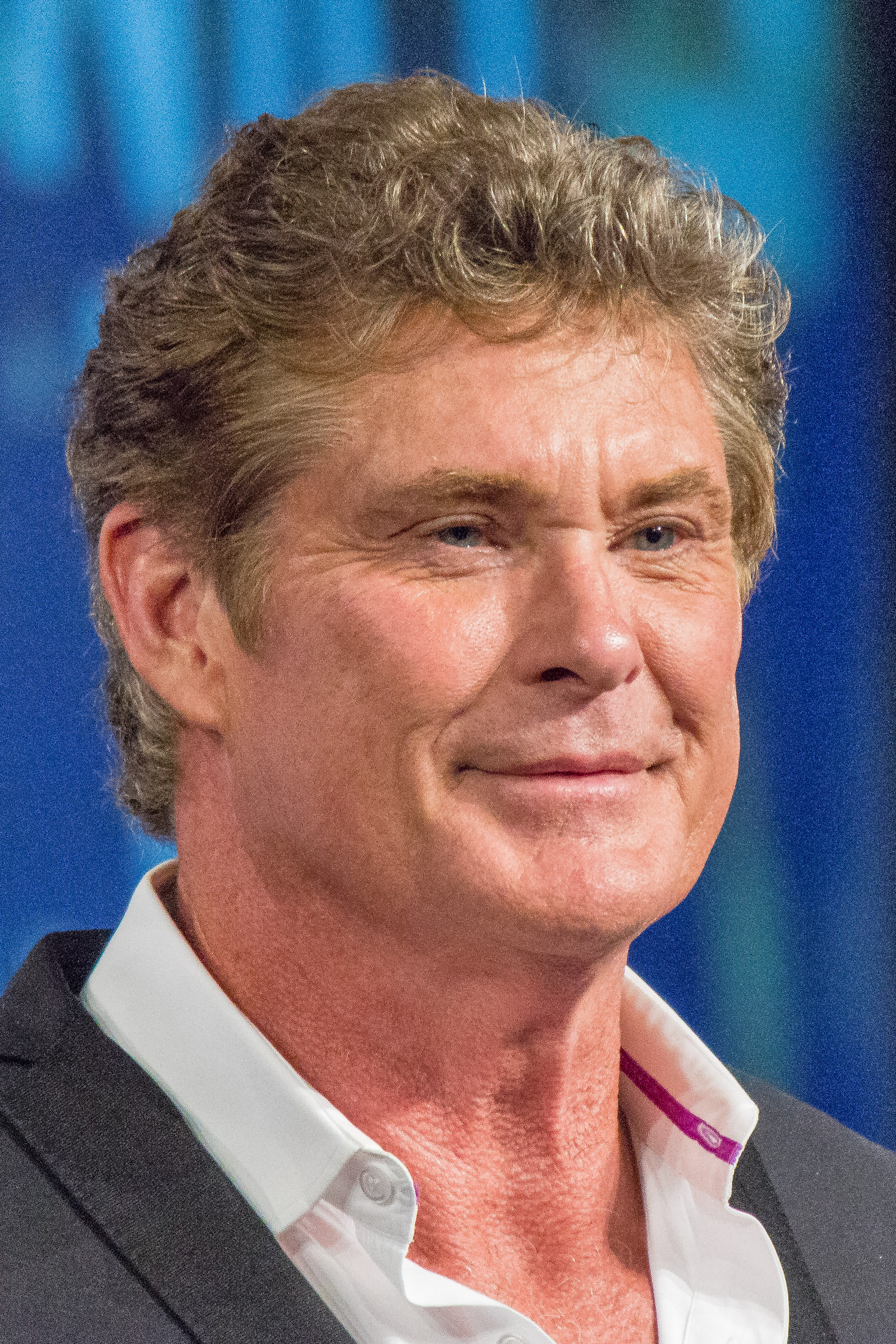
David Hasselhoff
(2011)

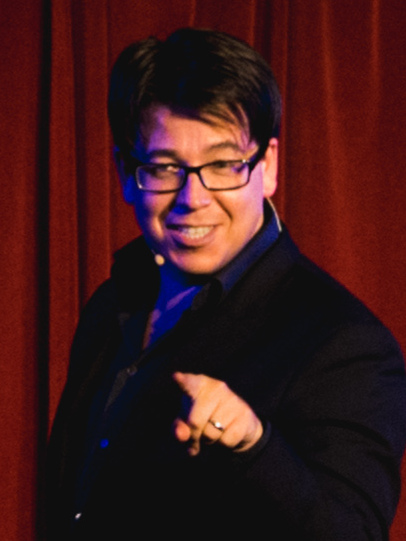
Michael McIntyre
(2011)

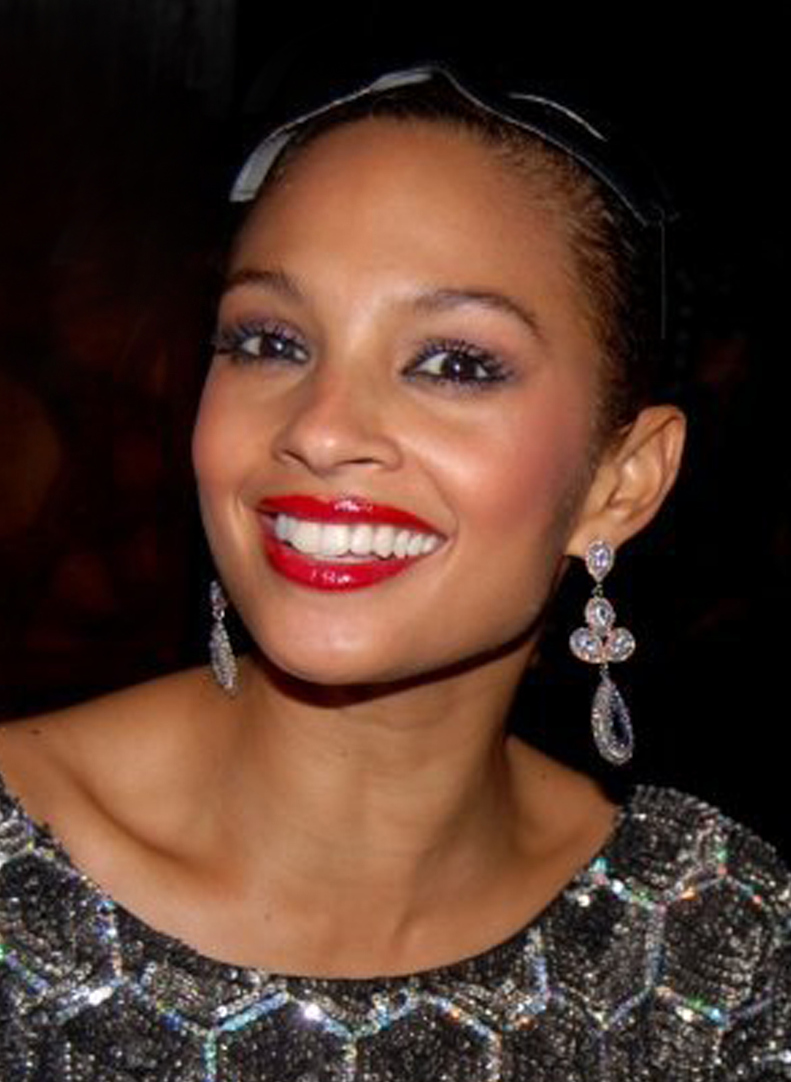
Alesha Dixon
(2012–present)

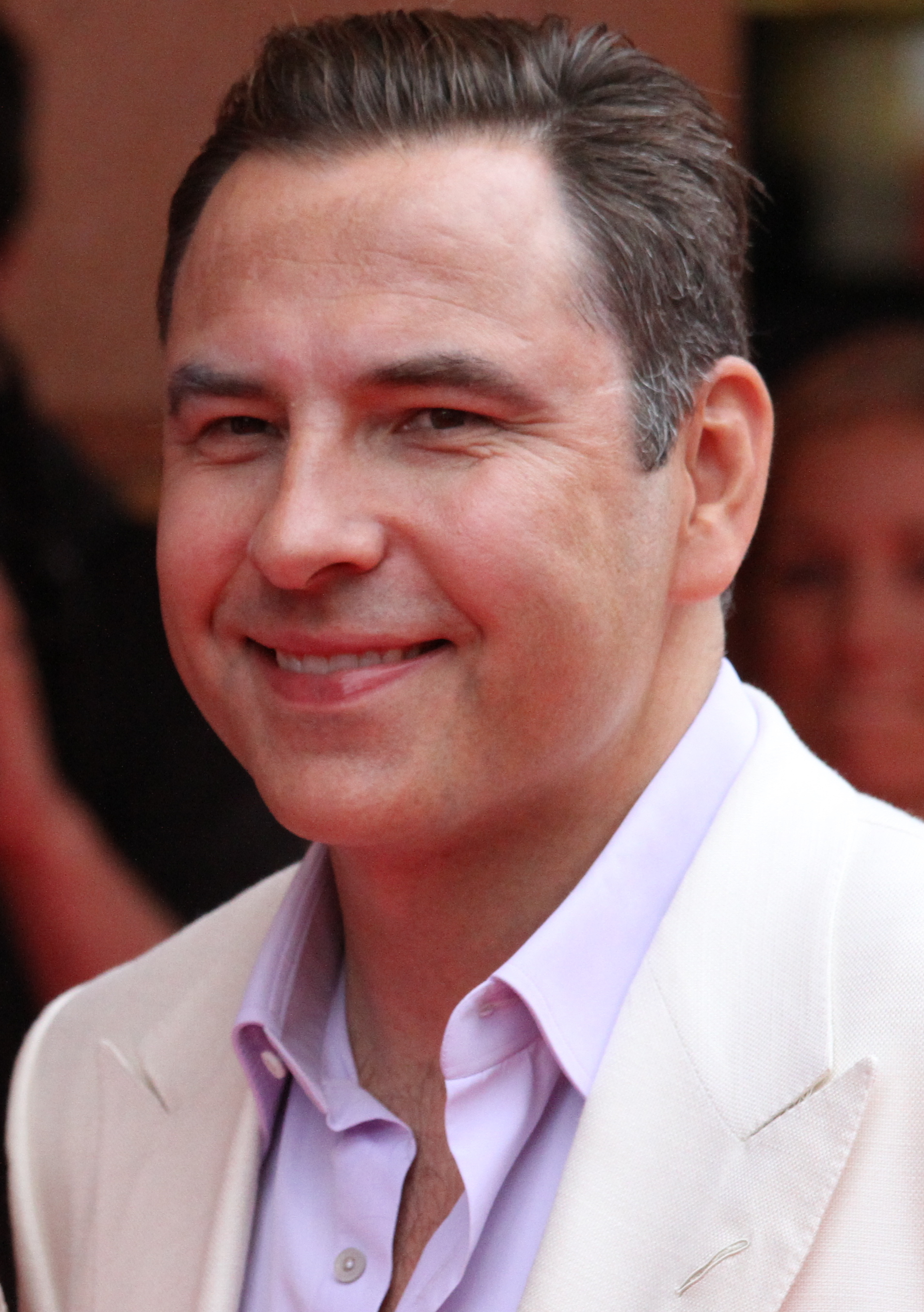
David Walliams
(2012–2022)

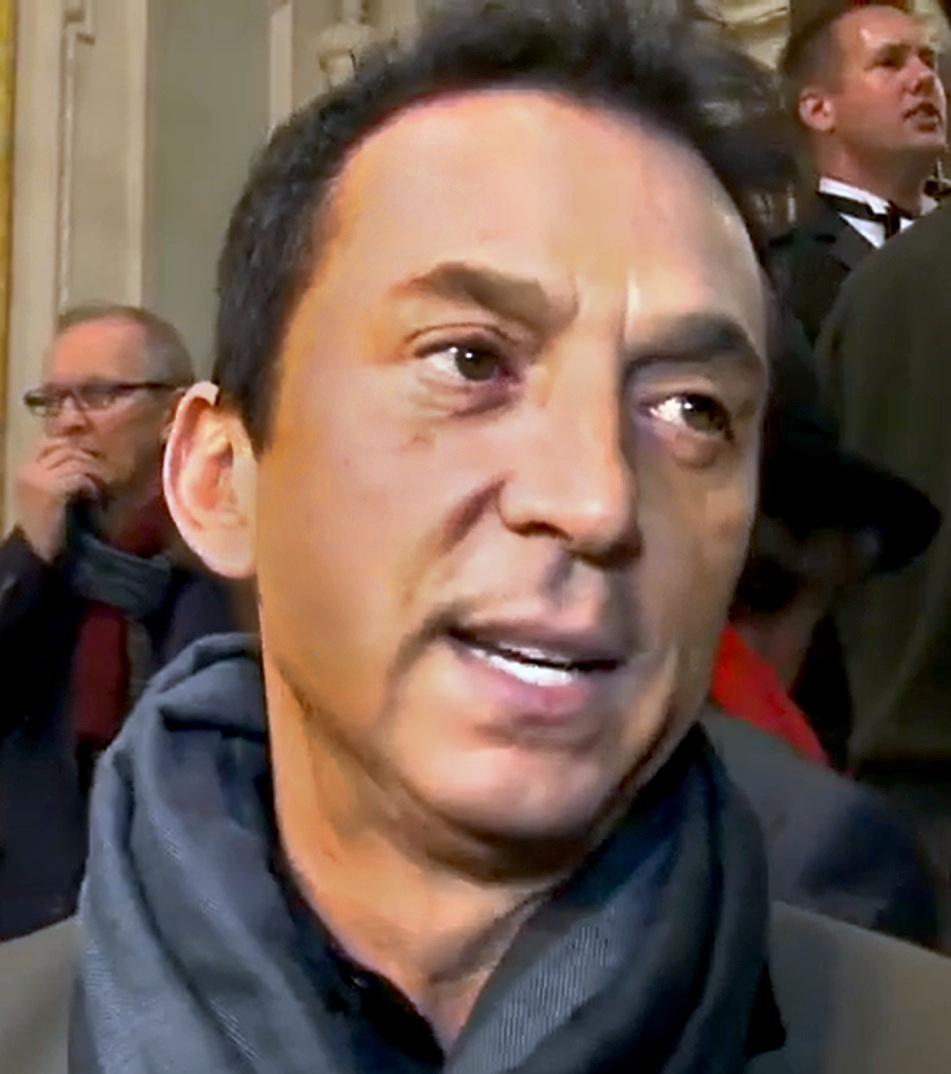
Bruno Tonioli
(2023–2025)

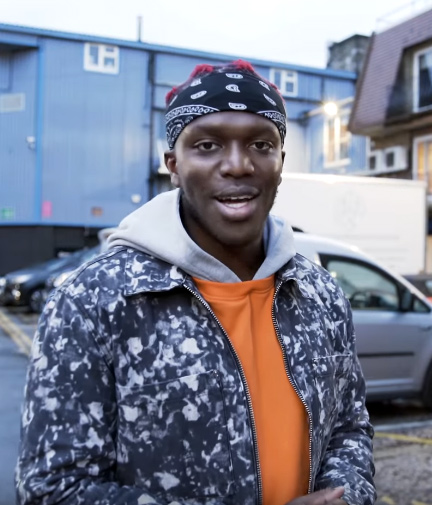
KSI
(2026–present)

=== Presenters ===
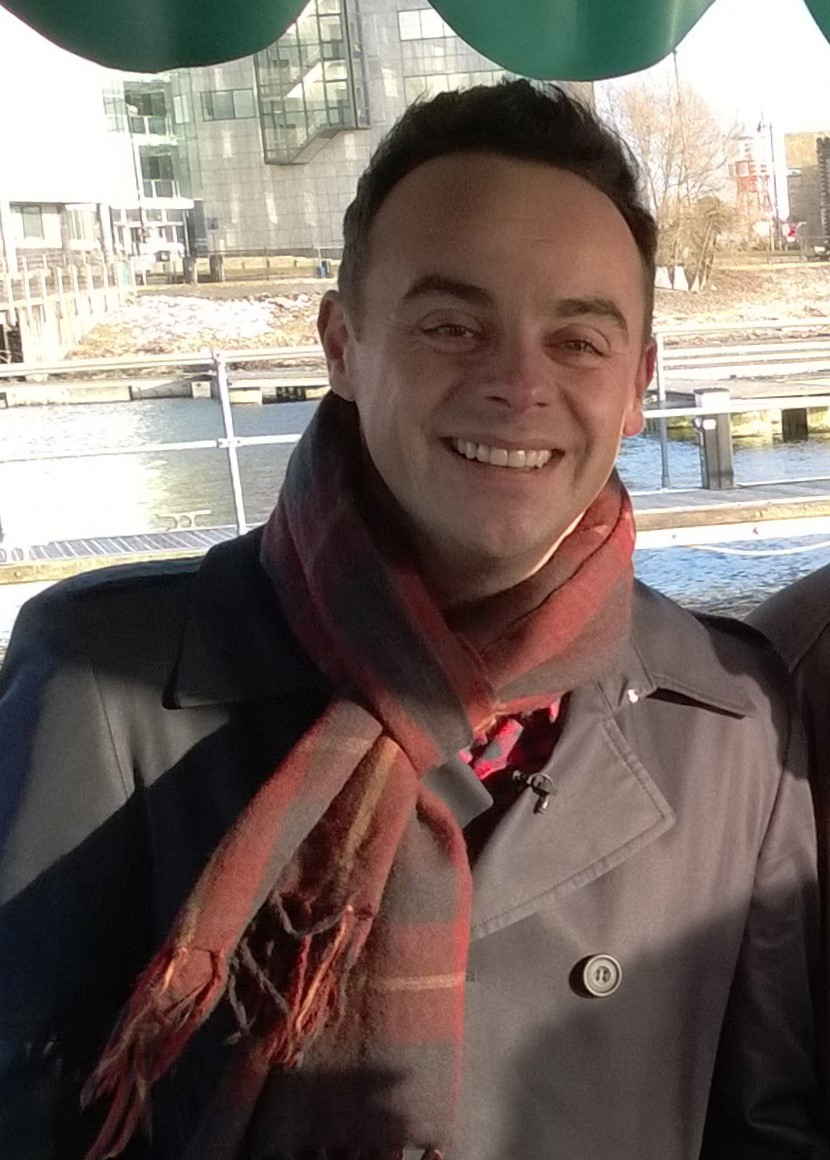
Ant McPartlin
(2007—present)

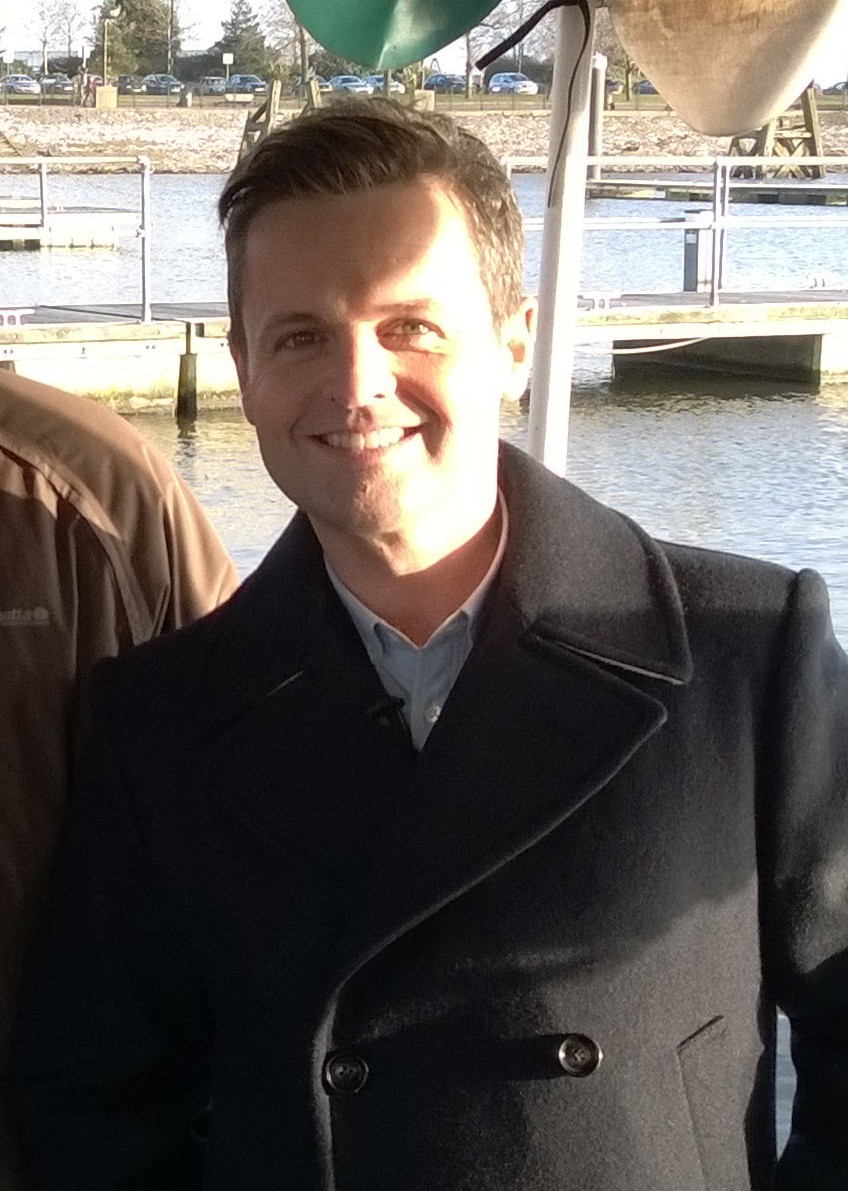
Declan Donnelly
(2007–present)

=== Guest Judges ===
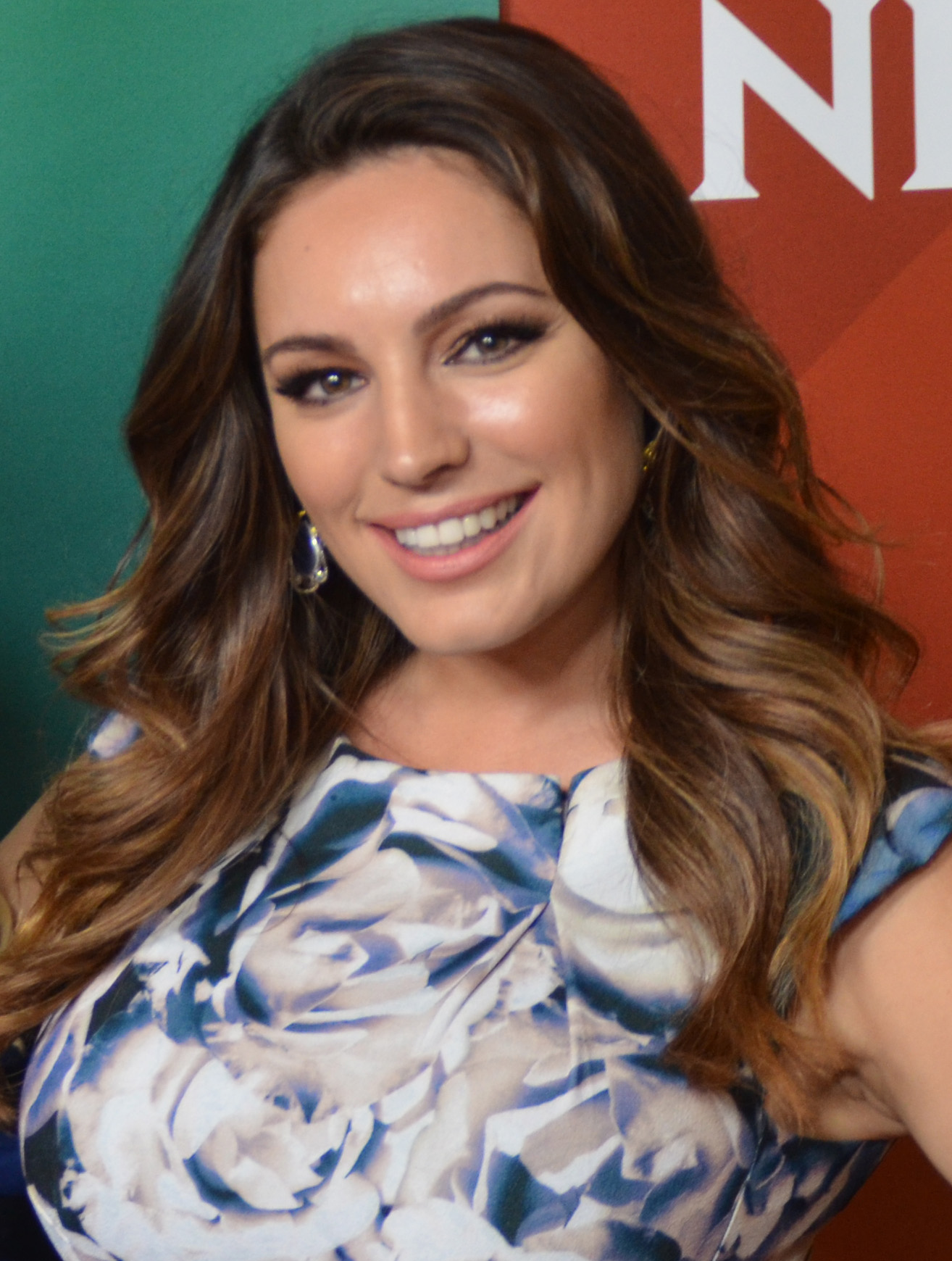
Kelly Brook
(2009)

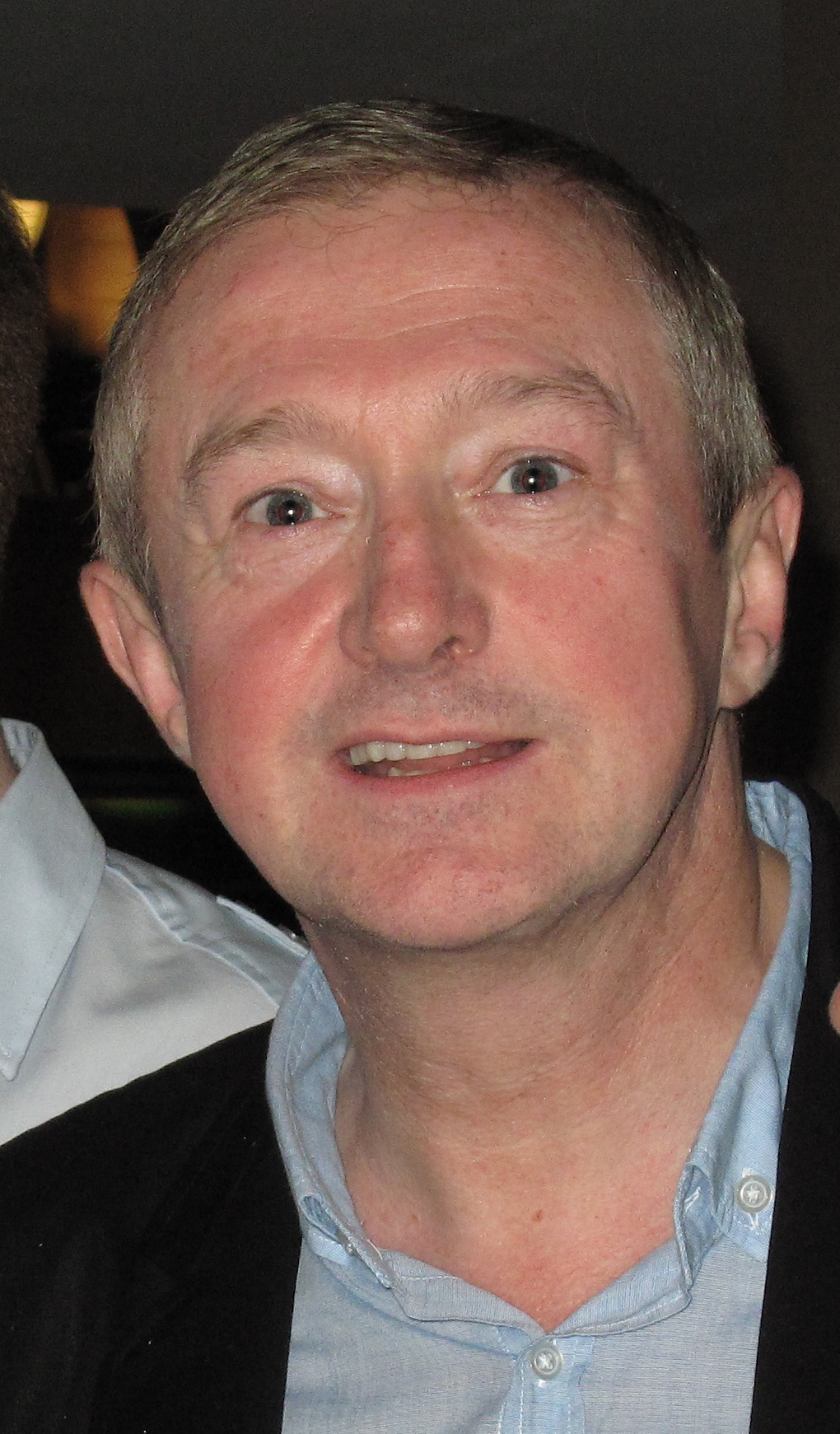
Louis Walsh
(2010–2011)

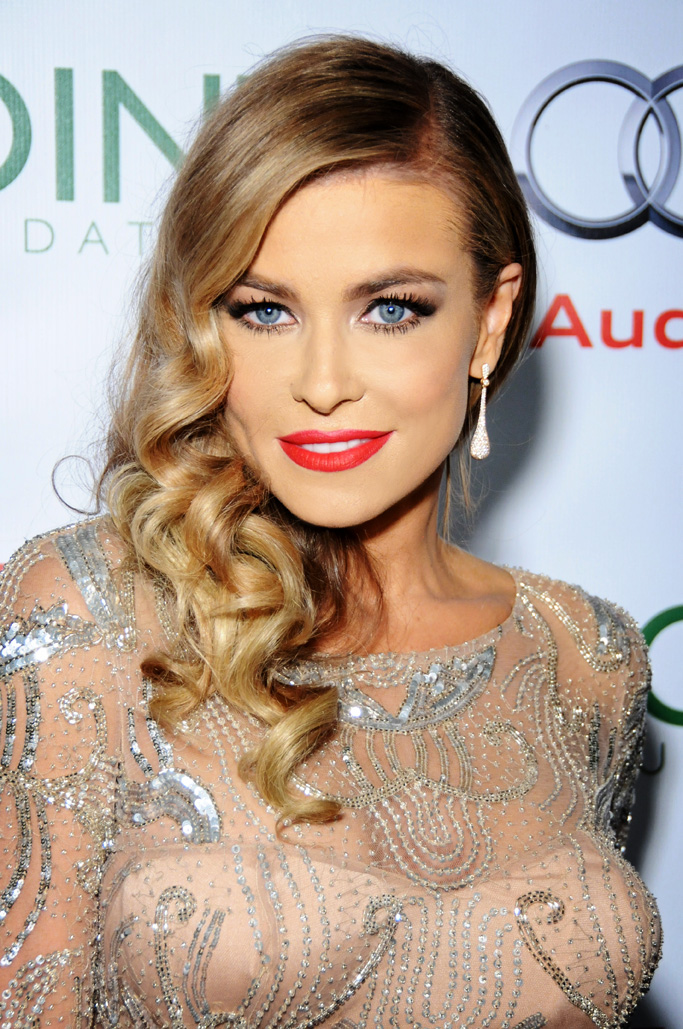
Carmen Electra
(2012)

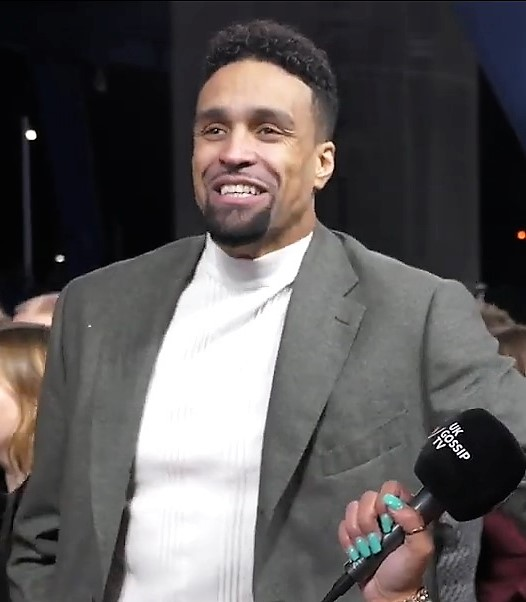
Ashley Banjo
(2020)

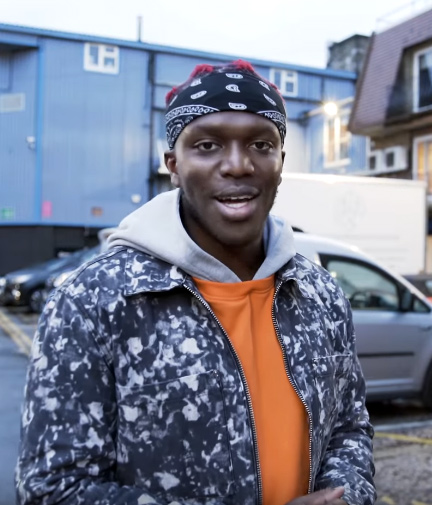
KSI
(2025)

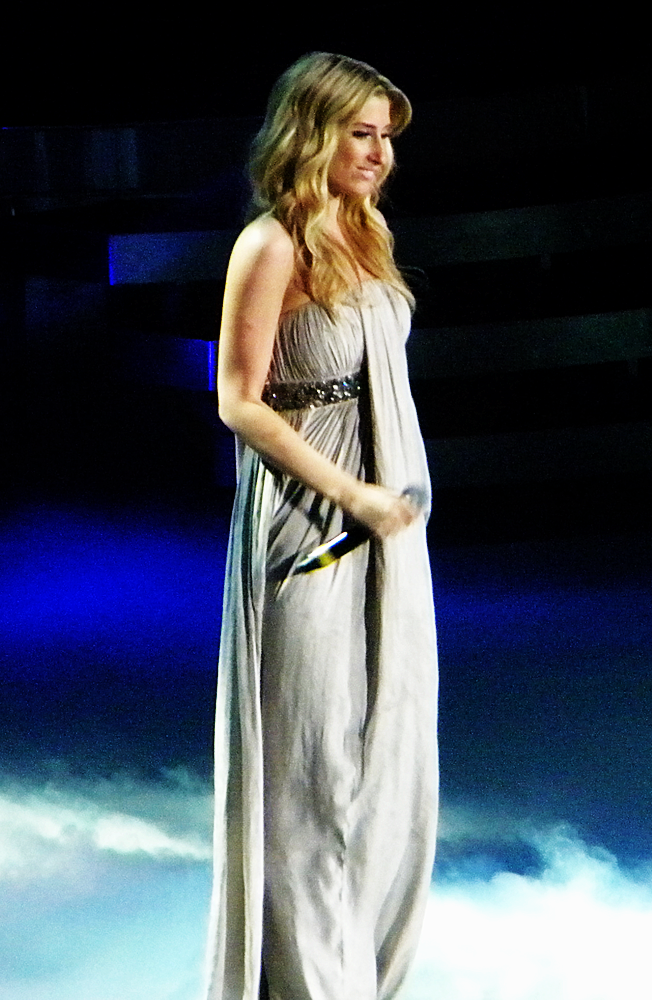
Stacey Solomon
(2026)

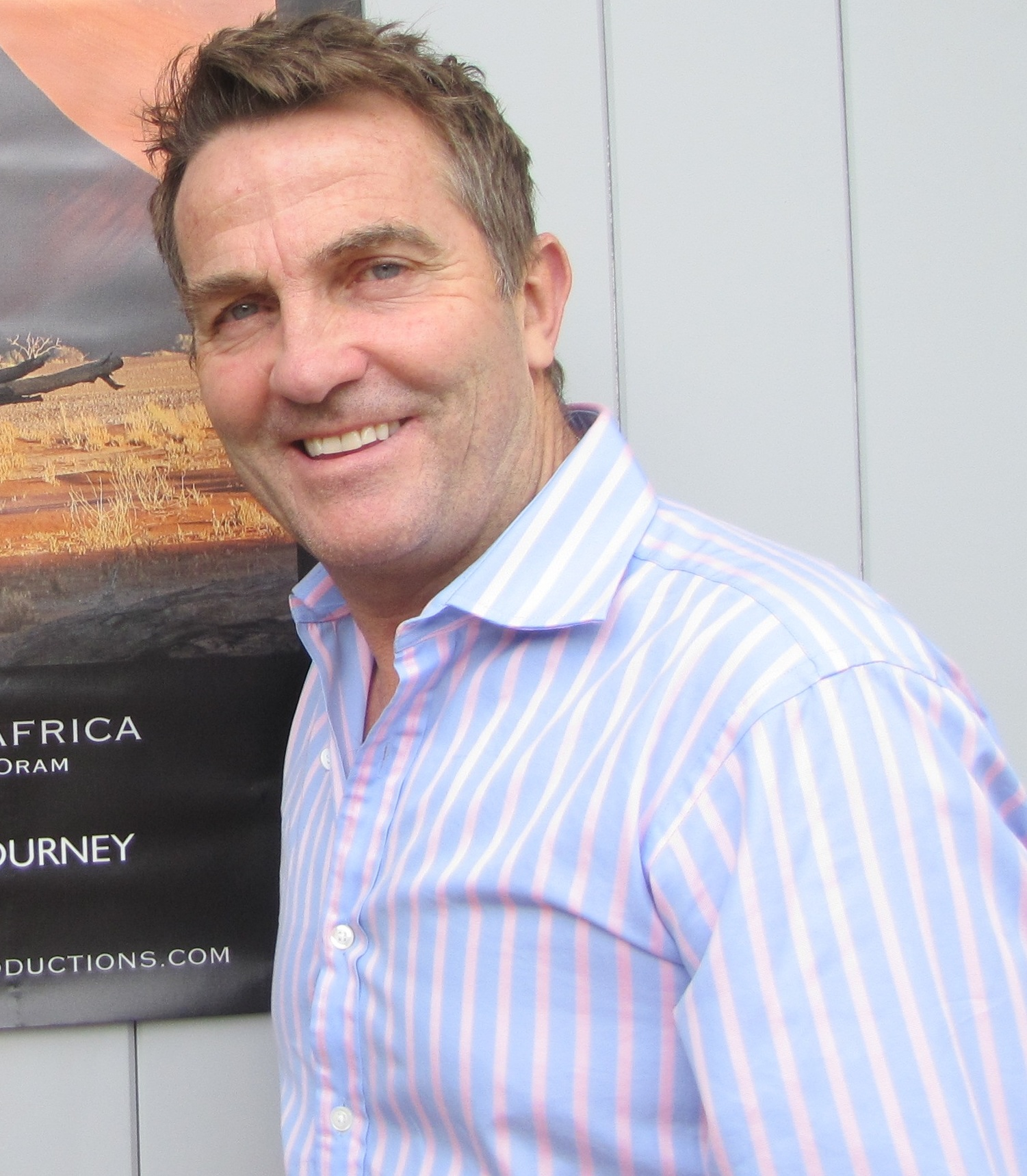
Bradley Walsh
(2027)

== Series overview ==
| Series | Start | Finish | Winner's prize^{1} | Winner | Runner-up | Third place | Avg. UK viewers (millions) |
|---|---|---|---|---|---|---|---|
| 1 | 9 June 2007 | 17 June 2007 | £100,000 | Paul Potts | Note: Five acts finished second in series one.^{2} | | 8.38 |
| 2 | 12 April 2008 | 31 May 2008 | £100,000 | George Sampson | Signature | Andrew Johnston | 10.21 |
| 3 | 11 April 2009 | 30 May 2009 | £100,000 | Diversity | Susan Boyle | Julian Smith | 13.36 |
| 4 | 17 April 2010 | 5 June 2010 | £100,000 | Spelbound | Twist and Pulse | Kieran Gaffney | 11.05 |
| 5 | 16 April 2011 | 4 June 2011 | £100,000 | Jai McDowall | Ronan Parke | New Bounce | 10.40 |
| 6 | 24 March 2012 | 12 May 2012 | £500,000 | Ashleigh and Pudsey | Jonathan and Charlotte | Only Boys Aloud | 10.07 |
| 7 | 13 April 2013 | 8 June 2013 | £250,000 | (Hungary) Attraction | Jack Carroll | Richard & Adam | 9.71 |
| 8 | 12 April 2014 | 7 June 2014 | £250,000 | Collabro | Lucy Kay | Bars & Melody | 9.84 |
| 9 | 11 April 2015 | 31 May 2015 | £250,000 | Jules O'Dwyer & Matisse | Jamie Raven | Côr Glanaethwy | 9.31 |
| 10 | 9 April 2016 | 28 May 2016 | £250,000 | Richard Jones | Wayne Woodward | Boogie Storm | 9.43 |
| 11 | 15 April 2017 | 3 June 2017 | £250,000 | Tokio Myers | Issy Simpson | (Malawi) Daliso Chaponda | 9.12 |
| 12 | 14 April 2018 | 3 June 2018 | £250,000 | Lost Voice Guy | Robert White | (Jamaica) Donchez Dacres | 8.33 |
| 13 | 6 April 2019 | 2 June 2019 | £250,000 | Colin Thackery | X | Ben Hart | 8.05 |
| 14 | 11 April 2020 | 10 October 2020 | £250,000 | Jon Courtenay | Sign Along with Us | Steve Royle | 7.88 |
| 15 | 16 April 2022 | 5 June 2022 | £250,000 | Axel Blake | Jamie Leahey | Tom Ball | 6.36 |
| 16 | 15 April 2023 | 4 June 2023 | £250,000 | (Norway) Viggo Venn | Lillianna Clifton | (Republic of Ireland) Cillian O'Connor | 5.98 |
| 17 | 20 April 2024 | 2 June 2024 | £250,000 | Sydnie Christmas | Jack Rhodes | (Ghana) Abigail & Afronitaaa | 5.81 |
| 18 | 22 February 2025 | 31 May 2025 | £250,000 | Harry Moulding | (Switzerland) The Blackouts | (India) Binita Chetry | 5.54 |
| 19 | 21 February 2026 | 30 May 2026 | £250,000 | The Hawkstone Farmers Choir | Celestial | (France) Anastasiia & Salsa | 4.40 |

Notes

1. In addition to the cash prize, winners also earn the opportunity to perform at the Royal Variety Performance in the year they win.
2. The Kombat Breakers, Damon Scott, Bessie Cursons, The Bar Wizards, and Connie Talbot.

=== Series 1 (2007) ===
The 1st series was aired during 2007, between 9 and 17 June. Auditions for this series took place within the cities of Manchester, Birmingham, London and Cardiff, between January and February earlier that year. The series had three live semi-finals, featuring a total of twenty-four semi-finalists, all of whom were vying for a chance to perform at the Royal Variety Performance and claiming a £100,000 cash prize. The series was won by opera singer Paul Potts and the results of the other finalists were not announced.

=== Series 2 (2008) ===
The 2nd series was aired during 2008, between 12 April and 31 May, and featured notable differences. Not only did the series run for much longer, auditions took place in Blackpool and Glasgow, the latter following complaints that Scotland hadn't been visited during the previous series (along with Manchester, Birmingham, London and Cardiff). In addition, the show had five live semi-finals, featuring a total of forty semi-finalists. The series was won by street-dancer George Sampson, with dual dance group Signature coming in second, and singer Andrew Johnston placing third.

=== Series 3 (2009) ===
The 3rd series was aired during 2009, between 11 April and 30 May, with auditions held in the same five cities as before. Initially, a change in format included a fourth judge, Kelly Brook, on the panel, but this was later dropped a few days after auditions began. The series was won by dance troupe Diversity, with singer Susan Boyle coming in second, and saxophonist Julian Smith placing third and fourth Stavros Flatley. It is the highest watched series in the history of Britain's Got Talent, attracting an average of over 13.3 million viewers.

=== Series 4 (2010) ===
The 4th series was aired during 2010, between 17 April and 5 June. A single episode of this series, intended for airing on 22 May, was pushed back to 23 May in order to avoid it clashing with live coverage of the UEFA Champions League Final. The auditions were once more held across the same five cities as before, though the series also held auditions with Newcastle upon Tyne. The city had been originally planned to hold auditions for the previous series, but these were cancelled before this could happen. Owing to illness, Cowell was unable to attend the Birmingham auditions due to having the flu, which led to Louis Walsh being in brought in as a guest judge for these. The series was won by gymnastic troupe Spelbound, with dancing duo Twist and Pulse coming in second, and drummer Kieran Gaffney placing third.

=== Series 5 (2011) ===
The 5th series was aired during 2011, between 16 April and 4 June, and was the first to be broadcast completely in high-definition. A single episode intended for airing on 28 May, was pushed back to 29 May, to avoid it clashing with live coverage of the UEFA Champions League Final. Auditions took place across the same five cities, though also included Liverpool. This series saw a change in the judging panel, following Piers Morgan's departure from the show, with Holden joined by David Hasselhoff and Michael McIntyre during the auditions. Cowell appeared during the live episodes of the series with the rest of the panel, while Louis Walsh returned as a guest judge for the London auditions when Hasselhoff couldn't attend due to other commitments at the time. The series was won by singer Jai McDowall, with singer Ronan Parke coming in second, and boy band New Bounce placing third.

=== Series 6 (2012) ===
The 6th series was aired during 2012, between 24 March and 12 May. For this series, the cash prize was increased from £100,000 to £500,000, and a new feature was introduced called the "Wildcard". This meant, the judges could select one of the acts eliminated in the semi-finals, to return and compete in the finals. The show also increased the number of semi-finalist for the semi-finals to forty-five, with nine acts per semi-final, and the number of judges for the entire contest to four. The previous series also featured four judges, albeit for the live episodes only. In addition, the show attempted to bring in a new way of voting for the semi-finals via a mobile app, but this was suspended for the series after it suffered technical problems during the first live semi-final.

This series featured an open audition in London, along with inviting other acts to audition via YouTube, before holding Judges' Auditions within Birmingham, London, Manchester, Cardiff, Blackpool and Edinburgh. As both McIntyre and Hasselhoff announced in late 2011 they wouldn't be returning, the show announced on 2 January 2012 that they would be replaced by David Walliams and Alesha Dixon. They joined both Holden and Cowell for the new series, the latter having announced he would be returning as a full-time judge on the show. Holden was unable to attend some of the auditions due to her pregnancy that year, leading to Carmen Electra stepping in as a guest judge for her. The series was won by trainer and dog duo Ashleigh and Pudsey, with opera duo Jonathan and Charlotte coming in second, and Welsh boys choir Only Boys Aloud placing third.

=== Series 7 (2013) ===
The 7th series was aired during 2013, between 13 April to 8 June. The show took a break on 29 May, due to live football coverage of England's friendly with the Republic of Ireland. While the show retained the new features introduced in the previous series, the cash prize was reduced to £250,000, with the series featuring auditions within five cities: Birmingham, London, Cardiff, Glasgow and Manchester. The series was won by shadow theatre troupe Attraction, with comedian Jack Carroll coming in second, and opera duo Richard & Adam placing third.

=== Series 8 (2014) ===
The 8th series aired during 2014, between 12 April and 7 June. This series was the first to introduce the "Golden Buzzer", and for the first time since the first series, auditions were not held in Scotland. Instead they were held in Northern Ireland within Belfast, along with Cardiff, London, Birmingham and Manchester. Edinburgh joined these cities to hold open auditions in late 2013, along with Blackpool and Brighton. Additional open auditions were held in various local branches of Morrisons within "Talent Spot" tents, owing to the show's sponsorship deal with the supermarket chain at the time. The series was won by boy band Collabro, with opera singer Lucy Kay coming in second, and rapper duo Bars & Melody placing third.

=== Series 9 (2015) ===
The 9th series was aired during 2015, between 11 April and 31 May. The "Wildcard" feature was updated this series, along with the judges being able to put forth an eliminated act from the semi-finals into the final (referred to as the Judges' Wildcard). The show allowed the public to vote between the three most popular eliminated acts, and the one with the highest number of votes advanced into the final. This act is referred to as the Public Wildcard. Auditions took place within Edinburgh, Manchester, Birmingham and London. The latter three cities held open auditions in late 2014 along with Newcastle, Cardiff, Portsmouth, Leeds, Norwich and Bristol. The winner of the series was trainer and dog duo Jules O'Dwyer & Matisse, with magician Jamie Raven coming second, and Welsh choir Côr Glanaethwy placing third.

=== Series 10 (2016) ===
The 10th series was aired during 2016, between 9 April to 28 May. Auditions were held within Liverpool, Birmingham and London, with all three holding open auditions in late 2015 along with Cardiff, Glasgow and Manchester. It was the last series to hold live episodes within The Fountain Studios, before its closure at the end of the year. The series was won by magician Richard Jones, with singer Wayne Woodward coming in second, and dance group Boogie Storm placing third.

=== Series 11 (2017) ===
The 11th series was aired during 2017, between 15 April and 3 June. The final was originally planned for 4 June, but this was moved forward to avoid it clashing with the One Love Manchester benefit concert that day. The series had two major changes: the first was the total number of semi-finalist reduced to forty with eight per each semi-final, as it had been prior to the sixth series; the second was the Judges' vote being dropped, with the two semi-finalists with the highest number of public votes moving on into the final. In addition, the live episodes were broadcast from Elstree Studios, owing to the closure of the previous site. Auditions were held within Salford, Birmingham, London and Blackpool. The latter two cities held open auditions in late 2016, along with Peterborough, Cardiff, Edinburgh, Kingston upon Hull, Lincoln, Reading, Manchester and Luton. The series was won by pianist Tokio Myers, with magician Issy Simpson coming second, and stand-up comedian Daliso Chaponda placing third.

=== Series 12 (2018) ===
The 12th series was aired during 2018, between 14 April and 3 June. Following the previous series, the Judges' vote was brought back into the show's format, while the live episodes were aired from Hammersmith Apollo and presented solely by Declan Donnelly. Although Anthony McPartlin had stepped down from his TV commitments in March 2018, he still appeared in the series' audition episodes, which had been filmed during January and February that year. Auditions were held within Manchester, Blackpool and London. Two of these cities held open auditions in 2017, along with a number of locations within the United Kingdom and Ireland (including Edinburgh, Perth, Dundee, Aberdeen, Glasgow, Dublin and Inverness). The series was won by stand-up comedian Lost Voice Guy, with comedy singer/pianist Robert White coming second, and singer Donchez Dacres placing third.

=== Series 13 (2019) ===
The 13th series was aired during 2019, between 6 April and 2 June. Following his absence from the previous series' live episodes, Anthony McPartlin made his return to Britain's Got Talent this year. Auditions were held across the same cities as before, including London and Manchester. This series saw three notable events – the withdrawal of an act from the live semi-finals, despite securing a place through their audition; the surprise return of a participant from a previous series' contest, operating under a veiled alias; and the contest being won by the oldest participant to take part. The series was won by singer Colin Thackery, with mentalist Marc Spelmann (under the stage name of "X") coming second, and magician Ben Hart placing third.

=== Series 14 (2020) ===
The 14th series was aired during 2020, but in two parts as a result of the COVID-19 pandemic affecting the United Kingdom. The first half focused on audition episodes that had already been filmed earlier that year, and were broadcast between April and May. Production resumed on the remaining episodes for the second half, following a hiatus, which were broadcast between August and October. Several changes were implemented: measures were put in place to protect those involved from infection, including the use of a virtual audience and social distancing; all episodes were aired weekly; and all semi-finals were pre-recorded, with the voting system changed as a direct result for these rounds.

Before the first semi-final was to be filmed, Simon Cowell sustained an injury following an accident in August, causing him to be absent for the rest of the series, and leading to him being replaced by Ashley Banjo as a guest judge in his place. The series was won by comedic pianist Jon Courtenay, with sign-language choir Sign Along With Us finishing in second place, and comedian Steve Royle in third place.

=== Series 15 (2022) ===
The 15th series was planned for production and broadcast in 2021, yet ITV, Thames and Syco Entertainment were concerned on how to safely conduct filming in the midst of the new government restrictions to combat the COVID-19 pandemic. After initially deciding to postpone production until later in the year, all involved parties agreed that they would not produce a new series until the following year, when government restrictions were eased and conditions surrounding the pandemic would be favourable for large-scale television production. The series began filming in January 2022, and airing on 16 April. The final took place on 5 June, with comedian Axel Blake winning. Ventriloquist Jamie Leahey and singer Tom Ball came second and third respectively.

=== Series 16 (2023) ===
The 16th series aired in 2023, between 15 April and 4 June. David Walliams did not return as a judge and was replaced by Bruno Tonioli. This series is notable of having eight Golden Buzzers instead of the usual five and also the first "group Golden Buzzer" by all four judges. The final took place on 4 June, with comedian Viggo Venn winning. Dancer Lillianna Clifton and magician Cillian O'Connor came second and third respectively.

=== Series 17 (2024) ===
The 17th series aired in 2024, between 20 April and 2 June. The entire cast from the sixteenth series returned. This series featured a total of nine Golden Buzzers, the most the show had ever seen. The final took place on 2 June, with singer Sydnie Christmas winning. Magician Jack Rhodes and dance duo Abigail & Afronitaaa came in second and third respectively.

=== Series 18 (2025) ===
The 18th series aired in 2025, between 22 February to 31 May. Auditions were filmed in October, at the Winter Gardens, in Blackpool. Bruno Tonioli was absent for some days of filming, due to his commitments to Dancing with the Stars, so KSI stepped in as a guest judge. Following the death of Liam Payne, which occurred days prior, Simon Cowell was also absent for some of the initial auditions, as he attended Payne's funeral, so KSI once again appeared as a guest judge. In November 2024, it was announced that the auditions will be entirely filmed in Blackpool and not in London for the first time in the show's history. This year's semi final saw the introduction of the golden buzzer for the first time ever, giving one of the Judges, or Ant & Dec (who chose to give their buzzer to KSI), the power to send an act straight through to the grand finale each week.

Harry Moulding was crowned the winner on 31 May, with 21.7% of the vote, and LED dance group The Blackouts finished as runners up with 15.1%

=== Series 19 (2026) ===
The 19th series aired in 2026, On 1 September 2025, it was announced that Bruno Tonioli will not return as a judge. At the same time, KSI was announced as Tonioli's replacement, joining Cowell, Holden, and Dixon. Cowell missed a day of auditions due to feeling unwell, leading to Stacey Solomon filling in as guest judge for that taping. Solomon was allowed to give out one golden buzzer during that taping. The final took place on 30 May, with The Hawkstone Farmers Choir winning. Drone display group Celestial and dog act Anastasiia & Salsa came in second and third respectively.

=== Series 20 (2027) ===
The 20th series will air in 2027, between February to May. Auditions began on 12 October, at the Winter Gardens, in Blackpool. Amanda Holden, Alesha Dixon, KSI and Ant & Dec all reprised their roles. Simon Cowell was absent for the auditions filmed in October, due to recovering from a surgery, consequently, Bradley Walsh stepped in as a guest judge. The auditions will resume in 6 January 2027.

== Spin-offs ==
=== Britain's Got More Talent (2007–2019) ===
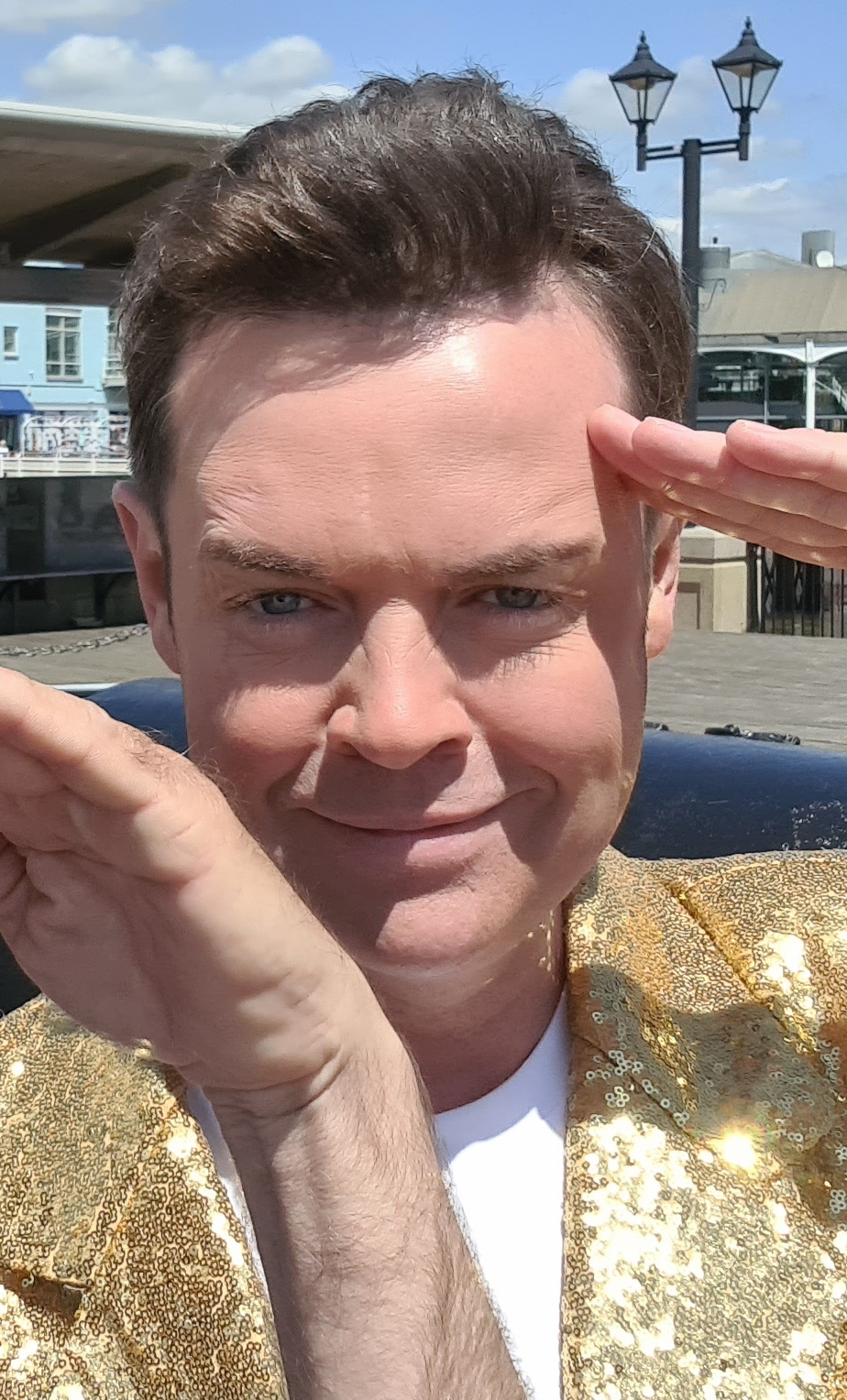
Stephen Mulhern, pictured here in 2022, hosted the sister show to Britain's Got Talent from 2007 to 2019

Britain's Got More Talent (often shortened to BGMT) was a companion sister show that was broadcast on ITV2 from 9 June 2007 to 2 June 2019 and hosted by Stephen Mulhern. Each series coincided with the broadcast of each series of Britain's Got Talent, with episodes airing after each episode of the main programme, and featuring regular appearances by Anthony McPartlin and Declan Donnelly along with the judges for the respective year. The format was based on those of former spin-off programmes such as The Xtra Factor (the companion show of The X Factor), but with notable differences depending on what stage of the competition the spin-off was airing. While the auditions stage was being broadcast, its sister show focused on highlights of acts that couldn't be shown on the main show, with Mulhern operating in a similar manner to the main show's hosts (albeit with interviews of the participants before and after their performance). During live episodes, the sister show conducted live "after-show" episodes, featuring interviews with the semi-finalists and eventual finalists, and talks with the judges. The series also aired a set of compilation episodes featuring the best and worst auditions from that year's contest, titled Britain's Got Talent: Best and Worst.

=== Britain's Got Talent: Unseen (2020, 2025–) ===
On 7 October 2019, Simon Cowell announced that Britain's Got More Talent would be shifted onto online platforms and thus provide more focus towards Britain's Got Talent. The decision was made due to changes in viewing habits from the sister show's target audience. Its replacement, Britain's Got Talent: Unseen, premiered on the ITV Hub in 2020, following the airing of the first episode of series 14 of the main show. Unseen did not return in 2022, which meant the main show had no companion show at all for the first time ever. It returned in 2025 on ITVX and from 2026 was broadcast on ITV2 in a Sunday afternoon slot.

=== Britain's Got Talent: The Champions (2019) ===
In 2019, Simon Cowell opted to create a spin-off edition of the contest, following the success of the spin-off for America's Got Talent. His plan was to produce a contest under the same subtitle and format as the American spin-off, focusing on bringing the best talent from across the Got Talent franchise (many from the British edition), to compete for a cash prize and the title of "World Champion" in the British public's opinion. Both the contest and the production of the programme began in Spring of that year, with the spin-off's planned broadcast date announced in the 2019 series finale of Britain's Got Talent. The spin-off was filmed between 24 and 30 July at Wembley Arena, premiering on 31 August 2019, with the contest being won by dancing duo Twist and Pulse.

In January 2026, it was reported that the Champions series would return to mark the main programme's 20th anniversary.

=== Britain's Got Talent Christmas Spectacular (2020) ===
On 1 December 2020, ITV confirmed that it was making a one-off Christmas special of Britain's Got Talent, which would feature the most memorable and talented acts over the past fourteen series of the programme's history (despite initial concerns that such a special would not be filmed due to the British government instituting a second lockdown in response to the COVID-19 pandemic during October that year). The special aired on 25 December 2020, hosted by Anthony McPartlin and Declan Donnelly, with the judging panel from the fourteenth series in attendance. Amanda Holden, Alesha Dixon and David Walliams were joined by Ashley Banjo from the series' live rounds, while Simon Cowell continued his recovery from a back injury earlier that year.

=== Britain's Got Talent: The Ultimate Magician (2022) ===
On 10 October 2022, ITV announced a new one-off special of the main Britain's Got Talent show. Similar to Britain's Got Talent: The Champions, but only magicians taking part. The Ultimate Magician featured magicians from previous series of BGT and from across the Got Talent franchise, competing for the "Ultimate Magician" title and £50,000. The one-off special featured judges Amanda Holden, Alesha Dixon and David Walliams and guest Penn Jillette (who replaced Simon Cowell due to commitments in the US). Former magician and Britain's Got More Talent host Stephen Mulhern hosted the show due to Anthony McPartlin and Declan Donnelly testing positive for Covid days before filming. The show filmed at the ICC Birmingham on 11 October 2022, and was aired on 18 December 2022. Eric Chien won the show, with Magical Bones as runner-up and The Witch in third place.

=== BGT Reacts (2024) ===
Ahead of the 2024 series of Britain's Got Talent, ITV announced a spin-off companion show titled BGT Reacts. Released on ITVX, the series sees British content creators reacting to acts featured on the talent show.

== Awards and nominations ==
Britain's Got Talent has been nominated for a number of National Television Awards in the category of 'Most Popular Talent Show' since 2007, but has lost out to its sister shows The X Factor and Strictly Come Dancing. Ant & Dec have won the award for 'Most Popular Entertainment Presenters' at the same awards for twenty-two consecutive years, as of September 2023. Britain's Got Talent has also been nominated for two British Academy Television Awards in 2008, but failed to win any awards. In 2007 and 2008, the show was nominated at the TV Quick and Choice Awards in the 'Best Talent Show' category, losing out to The X Factor and Strictly Come Dancing respectively.

In 2008, it was a recipient of a Royal Television Society Programme Award for its technical achievements. It has also won four Nickelodeon UK Kids' Choice Awards from five nominations. In 2009, it won its first ever Digital Spy Reality Award for George Sampson for 'Favourite Reality Contestant'. The show was further nominated in the 'Reality Show' category, but lost out to The X Factor in the 'Reality TV Presenter' category for Ant & Dec and two nominations in the 'Reality TV Judge' category for Cowell and Morgan.

| Year | Group | Award | Nominee | Result |
|---|---|---|---|---|
| 2007 | National Television Awards | Most Popular Talent Show | Britain's Got Talent | Nominated |
| 2007 | National Television Awards | Most Popular Entertainment Presenter | Ant & Dec | Won |
| 2007 | Nickelodeon UK Kids' Choice Awards | Best Reality Show | Britain's Got Talent | Nominated |
| 2007 | Nickelodeon UK Kids' Choice Awards | Best TV Presenters | Ant & Dec | Won |
| 2007 | TV Quick and Choice Awards | Best Talent Show | Britain's Got Talent | Nominated |
| 2008 | National Television Awards | Most Popular Talent Show | Britain's Got Talent | Nominated |
| 2008 | National Television Awards | Most Popular Entertainment Presenter | Ant & Dec | Won |
| 2008 | Nickelodeon UK Kids' Choice Awards | Favourite Winner | George Sampson | Won |
| 2008 | British Academy Television Awards | Lew Grade Award | Britain's Got Talent | Nominated |
| 2008 | British Academy Television Awards | Audience Award | Britain's Got Talent | Nominated |
| 2008 | Royal Television Society Programme Awards | Best Production Design-Entertainment | Dominic Tolfts | Won |
| 2008 | Nickelodeon UK Kids' Choice Awards | Best TV Presenters | Ant & Dec | Won |
| 2008 | Nickelodeon UK Kids' Choice Awards | Best Family TV Show | Britain's Got Talent | Won |
| 2008 | Nickelodeon UK Kids' Choice Awards | Best TV Baddie | Simon Cowell | Won |
| 2009 | TV Quick and Choice Awards | Best Talent Show | Britain's Got Talent | Won |
| 2009 | Digital Spy Reality TV Awards | Favourite TV Reality | Britain's Got Talent | Nominated |
| 2009 | Digital Spy Reality TV Awards | Favourite TV Reality Judge | Simon Cowell | Nominated |
| 2009 | Digital Spy Reality TV Awards | Favourite TV Reality Judge | Piers Morgan | Nominated |
| 2009 | Digital Spy Reality TV Awards | Favourite TV Reality Presenters | Ant & Dec | Nominated |
| 2009 | Digital Spy Reality TV Awards | Favourite Reality Contestant | George Sampson | Won |
| 2010 | National Television Awards | Most Popular Talent Show | Britain's Got Talent | Nominated |
| 2010 | British Academy Television Awards | Best Entertainment Programme | Britain's Got Talent | Won |
| 2011 | National Television Awards | Most Popular Talent Show | Britain's Got Talent | Nominated |
| 2011 | TV Choice Awards | Best Talent Show | Britain's Got Talent | Won |
| 2012 | National Television Awards | Most Popular Talent Show | Britain's Got Talent | Nominated |
| 2013 | Broadcast Awards | Best Entertainment Programme | Britain's Got Talent | Nominated |
| 2013 | National Television Awards | Most Popular Talent Show | Britain's Got Talent | Nominated |
| 2014 | National Television Awards | Most Popular Talent Show | Britain's Got Talent | Nominated |
| 2015 | National Television Awards | Most Popular Talent Show | Britain's Got Talent | Nominated |
| 2015 | National Television Awards | TV Judge | Simon Cowell | Nominated |
| 2015 | National Television Awards | TV Judge | David Walliams | Won |
| 2016 | National Television Awards | Most Popular Talent Show | Britain's Got Talent | Nominated |
| 2016 | 2016 British Academy Television Awards | Best Entertainment Programme | Britain's Got Talent | Nominated |
| 2017 | 22nd National Television Awards | Talent Show | Britain's Got Talent | Nominated |
| 2017 | 22nd National Television Awards | TV Judge | Simon Cowell | Nominated |
| 2017 | 22nd National Television Awards | TV Judge | David Walliams | Nominated |
| 2017 | 2017 British Academy Television Awards | Best Entertainment Programme | Britain's Got Talent | Nominated |
| 2017 | Diversity in Media Awards | TV Programme of the Year | Britain's Got Talent | Nominated |
| 2018 | 23rd National Television Awards | Talent Show | Britain's Got Talent | Nominated |
| 2018 | 23rd National Television Awards | TV Judge | Simon Cowell | Nominated |
| 2018 | 23rd National Television Awards | TV Judge | David Walliams | Won |
| 2018 | 2018 British Academy Television Awards | Best Entertainment Programme | Britain's Got Talent | Won |
| 2019 | 24th National Television Awards | Talent Show | Britain's Got Talent | Nominated |
| 2019 | 24th National Television Awards | TV Judge | Simon Cowell | Nominated |
| 2019 | 24th National Television Awards | TV Judge | David Walliams | Won |
| 2019 | 2019 British Academy Television Awards | Best Entertainment Programme | Britain's Got Talent | Won |
| 2020 | 25th National Television Awards | TV Judge | Simon Cowell | Nominated |
| 2020 | 25th National Television Awards | TV Judge | David Walliams | Won |
| 2020 | 25th National Television Awards | Talent Show | Britain's Got Talent | Nominated |
| 2020 | 25th National Television Awards | TV Presenter | Ant & Dec | Won |
| 2021 | 26th National Television Awards | Talent Show | Britain's Got Talent | Nominated |
| 2021 | 26th National Television Awards | TV Presenter | Ant & Dec | Won |
| 2022 | 27th National Television Awards | Talent Show | Britain's Got Talent | Nominated |
| 2022 | 27th National Television Awards | Talent Show Judge | David Walliams | Nominated |
| 2022 | 27th National Television Awards | TV Presenter | Ant & Dec | Won |
| 2023 | 28th National Television Awards | Talent Show | Britain's Got Talent | Nominated |
| 2023 | 28th National Television Awards | TV Presenter | Ant & Dec | Won |
| 2024 | 29th National Television Awards | Talent Show | Britain's Got Talent | Nominated |
| 2024 | 29th National Television Awards | TV Presenter | Ant & Dec | Won |
| 2025 | 30th National Television Awards | Talent Show | Britain's Got Talent | Nominated |
| 2026 | 31st National Television Awards | Talent Show | Britain's Got Talent | Nominated |
| 2026 | 31st National Television Awards | TV Presenter | Ant & Dec | Nominated |

== Criticism ==
The show was criticised by psychologist Glenn Wilson, who referred to it as a "freak show". He stated that "[contestants'] deficiencies and shortcomings are as important as their talent. We enjoy the stress we are putting these people under – will they or will they not survive?"

In two separate interviews in 2012, MC Kinky said "Shows like X Factor and Britain's Got Talent reduce the art of making music and practicing your craft to the level of a low rent game show with huge financial backing and support. It's a means to make money, not a means to produce ground breaking or interesting artists that demonstrate what they are feeling or are compelled to do. It's corporate" and "it's a churn 'em out fast food form of putrid s*** that I have no affiliation with".

In 2013, Bruce Forsyth questioned the show's allowing children to audition. He said, "I don't think that's entertainment. I don't think they should put children on that are too young. If you're going to do that, have a separate show. Have a children's show, British Children Have Talent." Cowell responded to Forsyth, stating that: "someone, Mr Grumpy, said we shouldn't have children your age on the show", after the performance of dance troupe Youth Creation. Jessie J joined the debate, declaring: "I cannot agree with kids having to go through three or four auditions when it's purely for ridicule. I don't understand why it's legal, I think it's wrong".

== Live tour ==
Between 2008 and 2011, several of the show's semi-finalists, finalists, and winners from various series, took part in a live tour titled "Britain's Got Talent Tour". The event consisted of several shows held across various UK cities during the Summer months, with site locations including: Cardiff, Liverpool, Birmingham, Belfast, Sheffield, Glasgow, Edinburgh, Nottingham, London and Manchester. When the first live tour hosted by Stephen Mulhern was announced on 17 April 2008, demand for tickets for the thirteen dates set for it was high. This led to an extension in the number of performances for it, increasing the overall number from twelve (the ten finalists from that year's series and two of the semi-finalists, Tracey Lee Collins and Anya Sparks), to twenty-two including matinées and a duet with Faryl Smith and Andrew Johnston. In 2009, Mulhern hosted a new live tour which initially featured four dates before it was later increased to run for eighteen shows. It included performances by Diversity, Flawless, Aidan Davis, Shaun Smith, Stavros Flatley, Hollie Steel, 2 Grand, Julian Smith, Shaheen Jafargholi, Susan Boyle, Darth Jackson, DJ Talent and the 2008 winner, George Sampson. In 2010, a third live tour was created, featuring a much larger schedule and taking place across sixteen cities and twenty-three shows. It was hosted by comedian Paddy McGuinness, and featured performances by that year's finalists of Britain's Got Talent: Spelbound, Twist & Pulse, Kieran Gaffney, Tobias Mead, Tina & Chandi, Paul Burling, Christopher Stone, Janey Cutler, Liam McNally and Connected.

In 2011, a fourth live tour was created. Hosted by Mulhern, it featured performances by the finalists of that year's Britain's Got Talent: Jai McDowall, Ronan Parke, New Bounce, Razy Gogonea, Michael Collings, Paul Gbegbaje, Steven Hall, James Hobley, Les Gibson and Jean Martyn. However, ticket sales were drastically reduced due to low interest in the tour was as a result of the financial climate that year. Because there were raised concerns a new tour would flop if sales failed to improve, the tour was axed in 2012.

It was announced in January 2026 that Britain's Got Talent would go on Tour in 2027. The show will be exclusive for Butlin's holiday resorts and will tour during selected half term and summer holiday breaks.

== Merchandise ==
There are 6 pieces of related merchandise:

- Best of The Auditions DVD (2009)
- The Electronic Board Game (2009)
- The Magic Set (2009)
- Finalists of 2009: Annual 2010 (2009)
- Be the judge buzzer (2010)
- Finalists of 2010: Annual 2011 (2010)

=== BGT App ===
Since 2010, a Britain's Got Talent app has been available on Apple's App Store and Google Play. The features of the app vary from year to year but always include an interactive feature (e.g. a buzzer, polls or quizzes), relevant social media feeds and clips from the show. In 2015, free in-app voting was introduced. This means viewers are able to vote free of charge five times per voting window during the semi-finals and final rounds.

As of 11 April 2022, the app is no longer available. Voting is now conducted through the ITV website.
