= Sirine =

Sirine can refer to:

- Sirine (Dungeons & Dragons), a fictional monster
- Širine, a settlement in Croatia
- Sirine Jahangir, British musician
