= Britain's Got Talent series 14 =

British talent competition series

Britain's Got Talent
- Series 14
- Presented by: Ant & Dec
- Judges: David Walliams; Alesha Dixon; Amanda Holden; Simon Cowell (auditions); Ashley Banjo (semi-finals and final)
- Winner: Jon Courtenay
- Runner-up: Sign Along with Us

Release
- Original network: ITV; ITV Hub (BGT: Unseen)
- Original release: 11 April – 10 October 2020

Series chronology
- ← Previous; Series 13 Next → Series 15

Judges and Presenter(s) for Britain's Got Talent Series 14

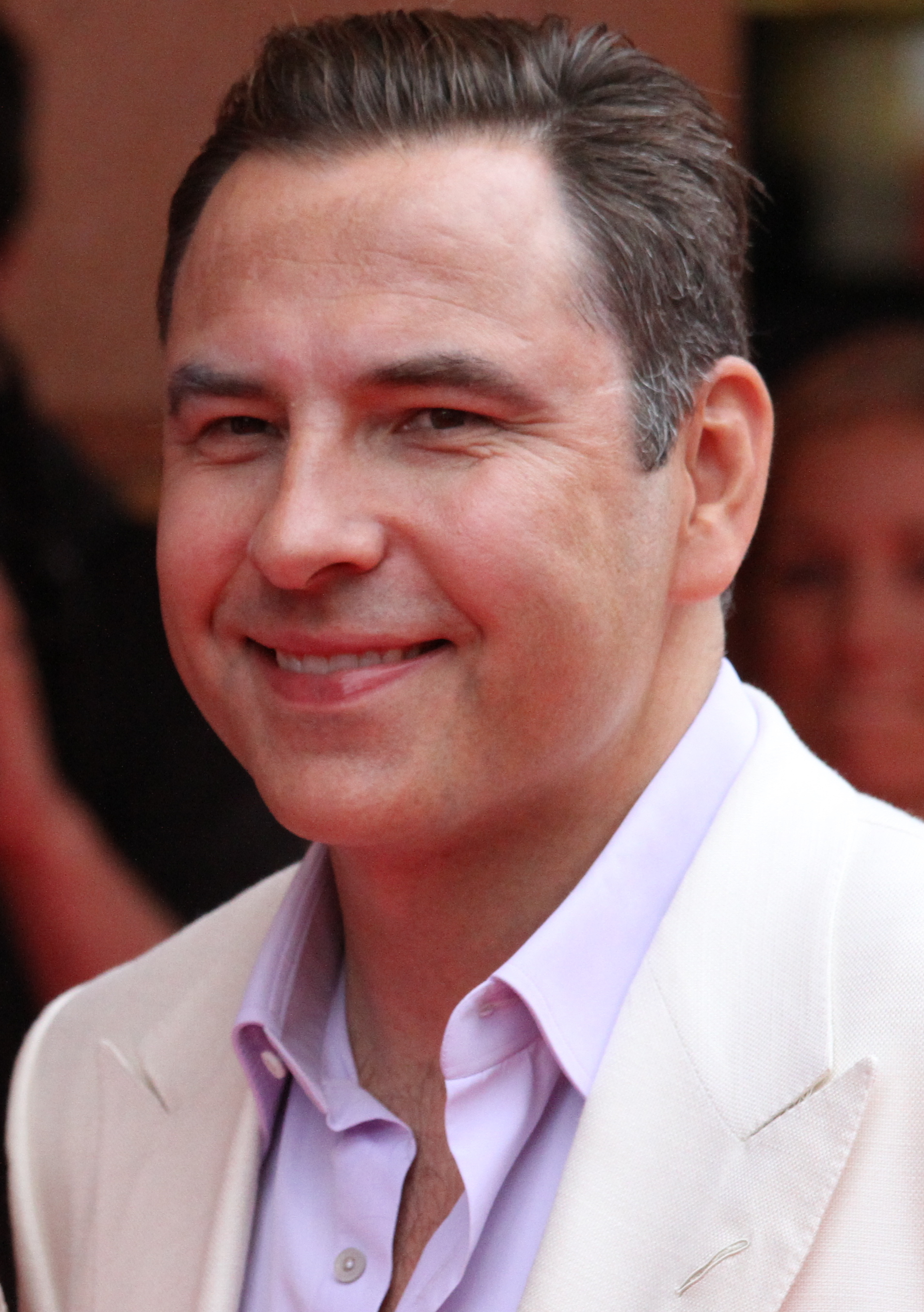
David Walliams

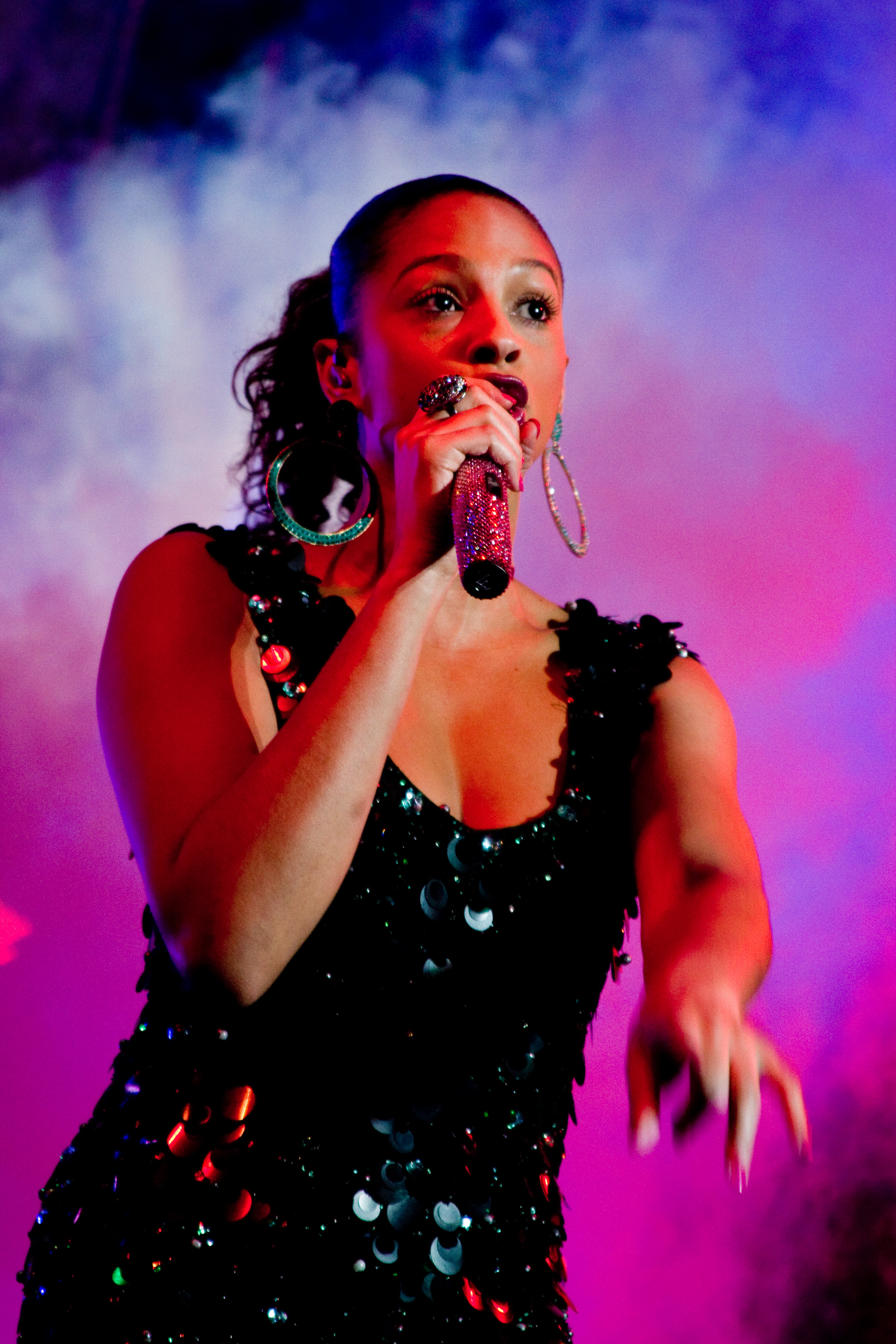
Alesha Dixon

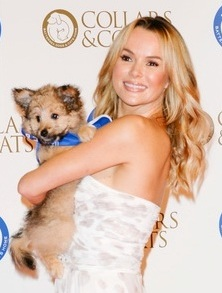
Amanda Holden

Simon Cowell (first half)

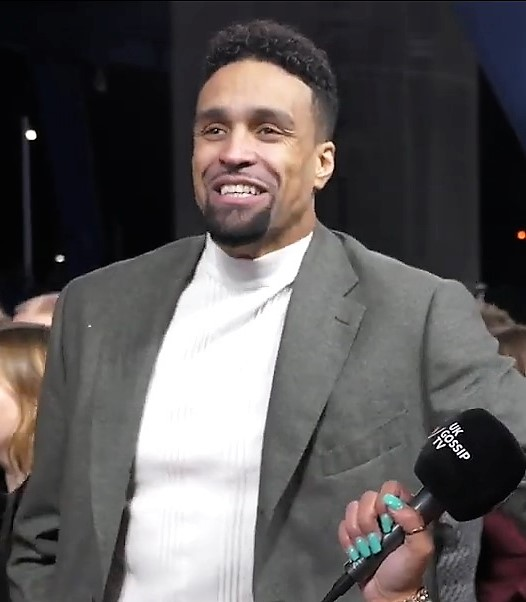
Ashley Banjo (second half)

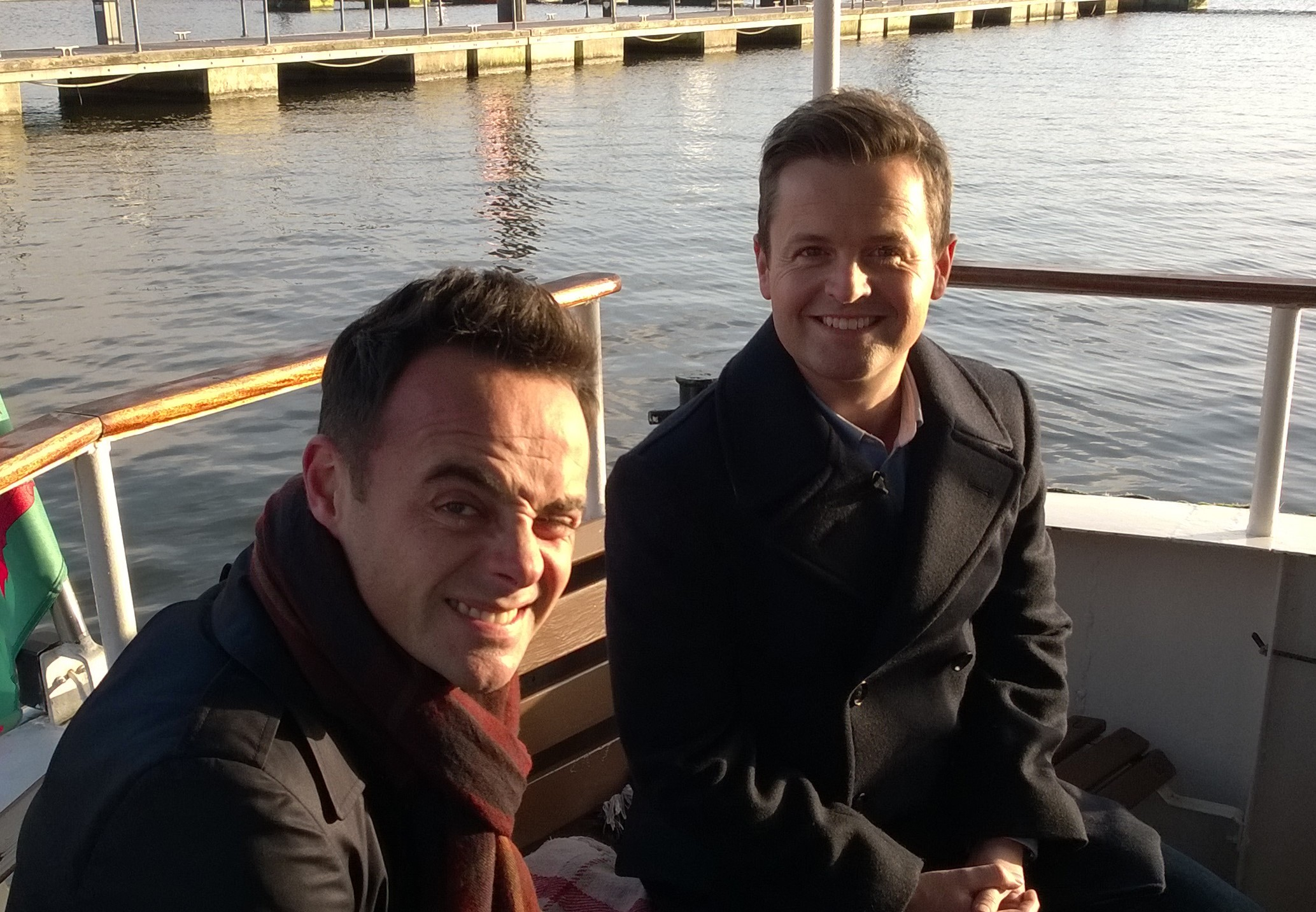
Ant & Dec

The fourteenth series of British talent competition programme Britain's Got Talent was broadcast on ITV, but in two parts as a result of the COVID-19 pandemic in the United Kingdom during that year which affected production on the programme. The first half consisted of audition episodes that had already been filmed, which were aired between 11 April to 30 May 2020. The second half consisted of the remaining episodes when production could resume, and were aired between 30 August to 10 October 2020. The series was notable for Simon Cowell's absence from the semi-finals and final after he sustained an injury following an accident in August, forcing him to be replaced by Ashley Banjo. He still appeared in the audition episodes as they had been filmed and aired before his injury. Before Cowell's injury, it was intended for him to be virtually present for the semi-finals because of travel restrictions and his commitments to America's Got Talent.

The semi-finals and the final incorporated a number of safety measures, including the use of a virtual audience and physical distancing amongst hosts, judges, participants, and staff, with all episodes being aired weekly - a first in the programme's history. In addition, semi-finals were pre-recorded, changing the voting format as a result, including the results of public votes being announced in the final. Following the previous series, the programme's sister show, Britain's Got More Talent, was effectively cancelled and was replaced by a new online spin-off, titled Britain's Got Talent: Unseen, featuring auditions not aired in the main programme. The spin-off didn't return the following series for unknown reasons.

The fourteenth series was won by comedic pianist and singer Jon Courtenay, becoming the first golden buzzer act to do so, with sign-language choir Sign Along With Us finishing in second place and comedian Steve Royle third. During its broadcast, the series averaged around 8.17 million viewers, despite the split in the broadcast schedule.

== Series overview ==
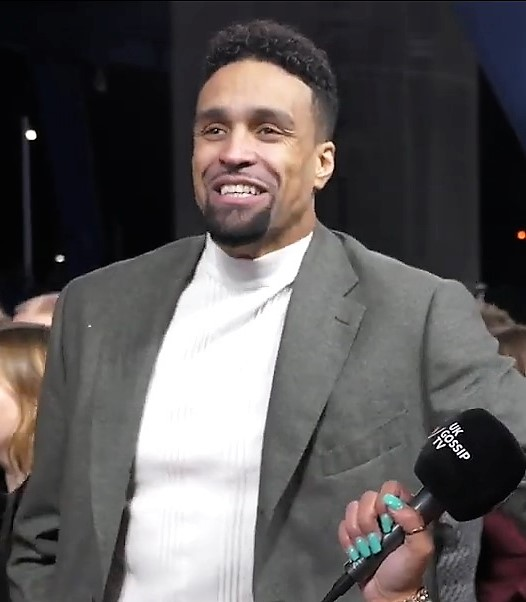
After Cowell's accident in August 2020, Ashley Banjo was appointed as a guest judge in his place for the remainder of this series

The judges auditions took place between January and February 2020, within London and Manchester. Prior to the start of production, staff had begun contemplating the future of its sister show, Britain's Got More Talent, in regards to its viewing figures and changes in viewing habits by its audience following the conclusion of the previous series. In October 2019, the decision was made to cancel the programme, and by 2020 it was decided that notable, yet unaired auditions for the fourteenth series would be made available via a new online spin-off titled Britain's Got Talent: Unseen.

Production on the series was dramatically impacted by the global coronavirus pandemic in March 2020, which was already affecting media productions across the world. While audition episodes had been pre-recorded and thus were aired as planned, British government measures implemented to prevent the spread of the infection effectively halted work on all live television productions. ITV was forced to split the series into two parts, and went into discussion with the production company over how to produce and air the second half of the competition within a safe working environment and ongoing monitoring of the pandemic. In May 2020, Amanda Holden indicated that production on the remainder of the series would resume in Autumn, with producers confirming in August that the remaining episodes would be produced and aired across September and October that year.

The broadcast schedule for the remaining episodes was revised, switching from being aired over the course of a single week, to a weekly arrangement, with only the final being aired live - the rest would be pre-recorded before their broadcast date. The format for these episodes was also drastically changed to provide a safe environment for staff, judges, hosts and participants: each round would be confined to a closed set; the judges would each have a separate judging desk; and a virtual audience would be present for each performance, in a similar arrangement used for the fifteenth season of America's Got Talent. Staff also arranged for large-scale performances to be altered in order to avoid mass gatherings; some had their routines pre-recorded in advance. The advancement of semi-finalists to the final stage of the contest was also changed. Instead of the original format used in previous series, judges would have first vote, choosing their top three acts in each semi-final and voting on which one of these would be sent to the finals, with the remainder from that semi-final, including those not voted for by the judges, facing a public vote to secure an additional place in the live final over the weekend of the episode's broadcast. The results of all five public votes would then be unveiled at the beginning of the live final.

One complication arose in August, when Simon Cowell became involved in an accident that left him suffering a back injury, and which required him to undergo surgery. Because doctors had advised him to not be involved in further television work until he recovered - his accident had already impacted his involvement in the live rounds for America's Got Talent that year - producers decided on bringing in street dancer and former BGT winner Ashley Banjo to act as a guest judge in place of Cowell during his absence. In addition, Holden was promoted to head judge for the semi-finals, effectively allowing her to make the casting decision in the event of a tied vote between the judges' top three semi-finalists.

Of the participants that took part, only forty made it into the five semi-finals - of these acts, singer Fayth Ifil, singing duet Honey & Sammy, comic singer & pianist Jon Courtenay, stand-up comedian Nabil Abdulrashid, and sign language choir Sign Along with Us, each received a golden buzzer during their auditions - with eight appearing in each one, and ten of these acts making it into the live final. The following below lists the results of each participant's overall performance in this series:

Winner | Runner-up | Third Place | Finalist
Semi-finalist | Golden Buzzer Audition

| Participant | Age(s) ^{1} | Genre | Performance Type | Semi-final | Result |
|---|---|---|---|---|---|
| Aaron & Jasmine | 28 & 32 | Dance | Latin Dance Duo | 2 | Finalist |
| Aidan McCann | 11 | Magic | Close Up Magician | 5 | Finalist |
| Allan Finnegan | 52 | Comedy | Stand Up Comedian | 2 | Eliminated |
| Amanda & Miracle | 49 & 7 | Animals / Magic | Magician & Dog Handler | 2 | Eliminated |
| Belinda Davids | 43 | Singing | Singer | 4 | Eliminated |
| Beth Porch | 25 | Singing / Music | Singer & Guitarist | 5 | Eliminated |
| Bhim Niroula | 54 | Singing | Singer | 3 | Eliminated |
| Billy & Chantelle | 14 & 12 | Dance | Contemporary Dance Duo | 4 | Eliminated |
| Chineke! Junior Orchestra | 11–22 | Music | Orchestra | 4 | Eliminated |
| Class Dynamix | 9–11 | Singing | Choir | 2 | Eliminated |
| Crissy Lee | 77 | Music | Drummer | 5 | Eliminated |
| Damien O'Brien | 34 | Magic | Close Up Magician | 2 | Finalist |
| Dario the Dinosaur | 37 | Singing / Music | Singer & Keyboardist | 3 | Eliminated |
| Ember Trio | 26–31 | Music | String Trio | 3 | Eliminated |
| Fayth Ifil | 13 | Singing | Singer | 1 | Eliminated |
| Håkan Berg | 43 | Animals / Magic | Bird Magician | 5 | Eliminated |
| Honey & Sammy | 15 & 43 | Singing | Singing Duo | 2 | Eliminated |
| Imen Siar | 21 | Singing | Singer | 1 | Eliminated |
| James & Dylan Piper | 38 & 12 | Magic | Magic Duo | 1 | Finalist |
| James Stott | 35 | Danger / Magic | Stunt Magician | 1 | Eliminated |
| Jasper Cherry | 14 | Magic | Close Up Magician | 4 | Finalist |
| Jon Courtenay | 46 | Comedy / Singing / Music | Comic Singer & Pianist | 4 | Winner |
| Katherine & Joe O’Malley | 36 & 59 | Singing / Dance | Singer & Tap Dancer | 4 | Eliminated |
| Kevin Quantum | 39 | Danger / Magic | Stunt Magician | 4 | Eliminated |
| Magical Bones | 37 | Magic | Magician | 3 | Finalist |
| Myra Dubois | 32 | Comedy | Drag Comedian | 3 | Eliminated |
| Nabil Abdulrashid | 34 | Comedy | Stand Up Comedian | 5 | Finalist |
| Papi Flex | 26 | Acrobatics | Contortionist | 4 | Eliminated |
| Shalom Chorale | 17–40 | Singing | Gospel Choir | 5 | Eliminated |
| Sign Along with Us | 4–58 | Singing | Choir | 3 | Runner-Up |
| Sirine Jahangir | 15 | Singing / Music | Singer & Pianist | 3 | Eliminated |
| SOS from the Kids | 4–16 | Singing | Choir | 1 | Eliminated |
| Souparnika Nair | 10 | Singing | Singer | 2 | Eliminated |
| Steve Royle | 51 | Comedy / Variety | Comic Juggler | 1 | Third place |
| The Coven | 10–19 | Dance | Contemporary Dance Group | 2 | Eliminated |
| The Soldiers of Swing | 31 & 41 | Singing | Singing Duo | 5 | Eliminated |
| Urban Turtles | 26–28 | Dance | Dance Group | 1 | Eliminated |
| Wesley Williams | 22 | Danger | Unicyclist | 5 | Eliminated |
| X1X Crew | 13–28 | Acrobatic / Dance | Acrobatic Dance Group | 3 | Eliminated |
| Yakub | 11 | Dance | Dancer | 1 | Eliminated |

- ^1 Ages denoted for a participant(s), pertain to their final performance for this series.
- ^2 Actual information the performer behind this act was not disclosed during their time on the programme.
- ^3 Locations for members of this group were not disclosed during their time on the programme.

=== Semi-finals summary ===
Buzzed out | Judges' vote | Won the Judges' Vote | Won the Public's Vote
Lost Judges' Vote | Eliminated

==== Semi-final 1 (5 September) ====
Guest Performers: Diversity

| Semi-Finalist | Order | Performance Type | Buzzes and judges' votes | | | | Percentage | Finished |
| Semi-Finalist | Order | Performance Type | Banjo | Holden | Dixon | Walliams | Percentage | Finished |
|---|---|---|---|---|---|---|---|---|
| Urban Turtles | 1 | Dance Group | | | | | 2.5% | 7th - Eliminated |
| James & Dylan Piper | 2 | Magic Duo | | | | | 41.8% | 1st - Advanced (Won Public Vote) |
| Imen Siar | 3 | Singer | | | | | 3.7% | 6th - Eliminated |
| Yakub | 4 | Contemporary Dancer | | | | | 22.7% | 2nd - Eliminated |
| James Stott | 5 | Stunt Magician | | | | | 10.0% | 4th - Eliminated |
| SOS from the Kids | 6 | Choir | | | | | 6.1% | 5th - Eliminated |
| Fayth Ifil | 7 | Singer | | | | | 13.2% | 3rd - Eliminated (Lost Judges' Vote) |
| Steve Royle | 8 | Comic Juggler | | ^{4} | | | N/A | Advanced (Won Judges' Vote) |

- ^4 Holden did not cast her vote due to the majority support for Steve Royle from the other judges, but admitted that her voting intention would have been for this semi-finalist.

==== Semi-final 2 (12 September) ====
Guest Performers: McFly & The NHS Choir ("Happiness")

| Semi-Finalist | Order | Performance Type | Buzzes and judges' votes | | | | Percentage | Finished |
| Semi-Finalist | Order | Performance Type | Banjo | Holden | Dixon | Walliams | Percentage | Finished |
|---|---|---|---|---|---|---|---|---|
| Souparnika Nair | 1 | Musical Theatre Singer | | | | | 19.7% | 3rd - Eliminated (Lost Judges' Vote) |
| Damien O'Brien | 2 | Close Up Magician | | | | | 22.1% | 1st - Advanced (Won Public Vote) |
| Class Dynamix | 3 | Choir | | | | | 5.0% | 6th - Eliminated |
| Allan Finnegan | 4 | Stand Up Comedian | | | | | 4.2% | 7th - Eliminated |
| Amanda & Miracle | 5 | Magician & Dog Handler | | | | | 18.5% | 4th - Eliminated |
| Aaron & Jasmine | 6 | Latin Dance Duo | | | | | N/A | Advanced (Won Judges' Vote) ^{5} |
| Honey & Sammy | 7 | Singing Duo | | | | | 10.4% | 5th - Eliminated |
| The Coven | 8 | Contemporary Dance Group | | | | | 20.1% | 2nd - Eliminated (Lost Judges' Vote) ^{5} |

- ^5 Due to a tied Judges' Vote, Holden cast the deciding vote for Aaron & Jasmine.

==== Semi-final 3 (19 September) ====
Guest Performers: James Arthur & Sigala ("Lasting Lover")

| Semi-Finalist | Order | Performance Type | Buzzes and judges' votes | | | | Percentage | Finished |
| Semi-Finalist | Order | Performance Type | Banjo | Holden | Dixon | Walliams | Percentage | Finished |
|---|---|---|---|---|---|---|---|---|
| Myra Dubois | 1 | Drag Comedian | | | | | 6.9% | 5th - Eliminated |
| Magical Bones | 2 | Magician | | ^{6} | | | N/A | Advanced (Won Judges' Vote) |
| Ember Trio | 3 | String Trio | | | | | 8.9% | 4th - Eliminated |
| Sign Along with Us | 4 | Choir | | | | | 34.0% | 1st - Advanced (Won Public Vote) |
| Dario the Dinosaur | 5 | Singer & Keyboardist | | | | | 2.0% | 6th - Eliminated |
| Sirine Jahangir | 6 | Singer & Pianist | | ^{6} | | | 31.8% | 2nd - Eliminated (Lost Judges' Vote) |
| X1X Crew | 7 | Acrobatic Dance Group | | | | | 14.5% | 3rd - Eliminated (Lost Judges' Vote) |
| Bhim Niroula | 8 | Singer | | | | | 1.9% | 7th - Eliminated |

- ^6 Holden did not cast her vote due to the majority support for Magical Bones from the other judges, but admitted that her voting intention would have been for Sirine Jahangir.

==== Semi-final 4 (26 September) ====
Guest Performers: Michael Ball & the London cast of Hairspray ("Good Morning Baltimore"/"You Can't Stop the Beat")

| Semi-Finalist | Order | Performance Type | Buzzes and judges' votes | | | | Percentage | Finished |
| Semi-Finalist | Order | Performance Type | Banjo | Holden | Dixon | Walliams | Percentage | Finished |
|---|---|---|---|---|---|---|---|---|
| Billy & Chantelle | 1 | Contemporary Dance Duo | | | | | 7.5% | 4th - Eliminated |
| Chineke! Junior Orchestra | 2 | Orchestra | | | | | 8.5% | 3rd - Eliminated |
| Katherine & Joe O’Malley | 3 | Singer & Tap Dancer | | | | | 3.4% | 7th - Eliminated |
| Kevin Quantum | 4 | Stunt Magician | | | | | 5.3% | 5th - Eliminated |
| Jon Courtenay | 5 | Comic Singer & Pianist | | | | | N/A | Advanced (Won Judges' Vote) |
| Jasper Cherry | 6 | Close Up Magician | | | | | 49.2% | 1st - Advanced (Won Public Vote) |
| Papi Flex | 7 | Contortionist | | | | | 4.9% | 6th - Eliminated |
| Belinda Davids | 8 | Singer | | | | | 21.2% | 2nd - Eliminated (Lost Judges' Vote) |

==== Semi-final 5 (3 October) ====
Guest Performers: Colin Thackery & The Kingdom Choir ("What the World Needs Now Is Love") and Amanda Holden ("Not While I'm Around")

| Semi-Finalist | Order | Performance Type | Buzzes and judges' votes | | | | Percentage | Finished |
| Semi-Finalist | Order | Performance Type | Banjo | Holden | Dixon | Walliams | Percentage | Finished |
|---|---|---|---|---|---|---|---|---|
| The Soldiers of Swing | 1 | Singing Duo | | | | | 9.0% | 5th - Eliminated |
| Håkan Berg | 2 | Bird Magician | | | | | 14.2% | 4th - Eliminated |
| Shalom Chorale | 3 | Gospel Choir | | | | | 6.3% | 6th - Eliminated |
| Wesley Williams | 4 | Unicyclist | | ^{7} | | | 16.1% | 3rd - Eliminated (Lost Judges' Vote) |
| Crissy Lee | 5 | Drummer | | | | | 2.6% | 7th - Eliminated |
| Nabil Abdulrashid | 6 | Stand Up Comedian | | ^{7} | | | N/A | Advanced (Won Judges' Vote) |
| Aidan McCann | 7 | Close Up Magician | | | | | 27.0% | 1st - Advanced (Won Public Vote) |
| Beth Porch | 8 | Singer & Guitarist | | | | | 24.8% | 2nd - Eliminated |

- ^7 Holden did not cast her vote due to the majority support for Nabil Abdulrashid from the other judges, but admitted that her voting intention would have been for Wesley Williams.

=== Final (10 October) ===
Guest Performers: The cast of Mary Poppins, The Phantom of the Opera & Les Misérables ("Step in Time"/"The Phantom of the Opera"/"One Day More")

Winner | Runner-up

| Finalist | Order | Performance Type | Percentage | Finished |
|---|---|---|---|---|
| Aidan McCann | 1 | Close Up Magician | 3.7% | 7th |
| Aaron & Jasmine | 2 | Latin Dance Duo | 0.8% | 10th |
| Damien O'Brien | 3 | Close Up Magician | 4.6% | 6th |
| Steve Royle | 4 | Comic Juggler | 14.1% | 3rd |
| Magical Bones | 5 | Magician | 2.9% | 9th |
| Sign Along with Us | 6 | Choir | 15.3% | 2nd |
| James & Dylan Piper | 7 | Magic Duo | 5.7% | 5th |
| Nabil Abdulrashid | 8 | Stand Up Comedian | 13.9% | 4th |
| Jasper Cherry | 9 | Close Up Magician | 3.3% | 8th |
| Jon Courtenay | 10 | Comic Singer & Pianist | 35.7% | 1st |

== Ratings ==
| Episode | Air date | Total viewers (millions) | ITV Weekly rank |
|---|---|---|---|
| Auditions 1 | 11 April | 10.96 | 1 |
| Auditions 2 | 18 April | 10.32 | 1 |
| Auditions 3 | 25 April | 10.04 | 1 |
| Auditions 4 | 2 May | 9.84 | 1 |
| Auditions 5 | 9 May | 8.92 | 1 |
| Auditions 6 | 16 May | 8.89 | 1 |
| Auditions 7 | 23 May | 8.73 | 1 |
| Auditions 8 | 30 May | 7.62 | 1 |
| The Finalists Revealed | 30 August | 5.06 | 7 |
| Semi-final 1 | 5 September | 7.13 | 1 |
| Semi-final 2 | 12 September | 6.11 | 4 |
| Semi-final 3 | 19 September | 5.58 | 9 |
| Semi-final 4 | 26 September | 6.07 | 5 |
| Semi-final 5 | 3 October | 5.80 | 9 |
| Final | 10 October | 7.12 | 1 |

== Criticism ==
During the fourteenth series of Britain's Got Talent, racial issues were made key elements in complaints made by viewers regarding performances that were broadcast during the final rounds of the competition. In the first semi-final, aired on 5 September 2020, guest performer Diversity performed a dance routine inspired by the Black Lives Matter movement, which, despite being praised, received criticism from some viewers. The regulator Ofcom initially received over a thousand complaints to begin with, before this increased to around 24,500 based on news stories covering the original number of complaints. However, the regulator rejected all complaints on 17 September, ruling that the criticism was unfounded and that the performance had been aiming to promote "social cohesion and unity", adding that "freedom of expression is particularly important in the context of artistic works".

In contrast, comedian Nabil Abdulrashid received considerable criticism over his performances in the semi-final and final. Although he was overwhelmed by the support he received for his comedic talent, Abdulrashid admitted in an interview that some of his work had led him to receive racial abuse and death threats because of his open support for Black Lives Matter. His routines themselves later saw Ofcom receive around 3,000 complaints over the nature of his jokes being aired on a family programme, yet the regulator rejected these on grounds that the comedian had performed within acceptable boundaries.
