= Magical Bones =

British magician

- Born: Richard Essien
- Occupation: Magician
- Website: http://www.magicalbones.com

Richard Essien, known professionally as Magical Bones, is a UK-based magician, illusionist and b-boy.

== Career ==
He started his career as a dancer with Madonna, The Black Eyed Peas, Alicia Keys, and Plan B, and starred in the music video for Mint Royale's "Singin' in the Rain". He also performed around the world including for Madonna's son's 10th birthday party.

=== TV appearances ===
In 2015, he starred in Sky's Around the World in 80 Tricks, and appeared twice on This Morning. He was a finalist in series 14 of Britain's Got Talent in 2020 finishing in ninth place, where related the story of Henry Box Brown. He featured alongside Penn & Teller in their show Penn & Teller:Fool Us, as well as Pure Magic and Crackerjack on the BBC. He appeared on Sky's, Unmuted. and was the runner up for the ITV Christmas Special BGT: Ultimate Magician in December 2022

=== Theatre ===
Bones was cast as one of the six magicians to feature in the West End magic show Impossible, which debuted at the Noel Coward Theatre and then went on to tour around the U.K and globally in Dubai, Lebanon, and the Philippines.

Bones’ debut solo show Black Magic sold out residencies at London's Southbank Festival and the Edinburgh Fringe Festival and went on to play around the UK.

His second show Soulful Magic premiered in 2022 at Edinburgh Festival Fringe, and was set for a nationwide tour in the spring of 2023. His sister, comedian Eme Essien, was also proforming at the Edinburgh Fringe at the same time.
