= Jon Courtenay =

English singer and comedian (born 1973)

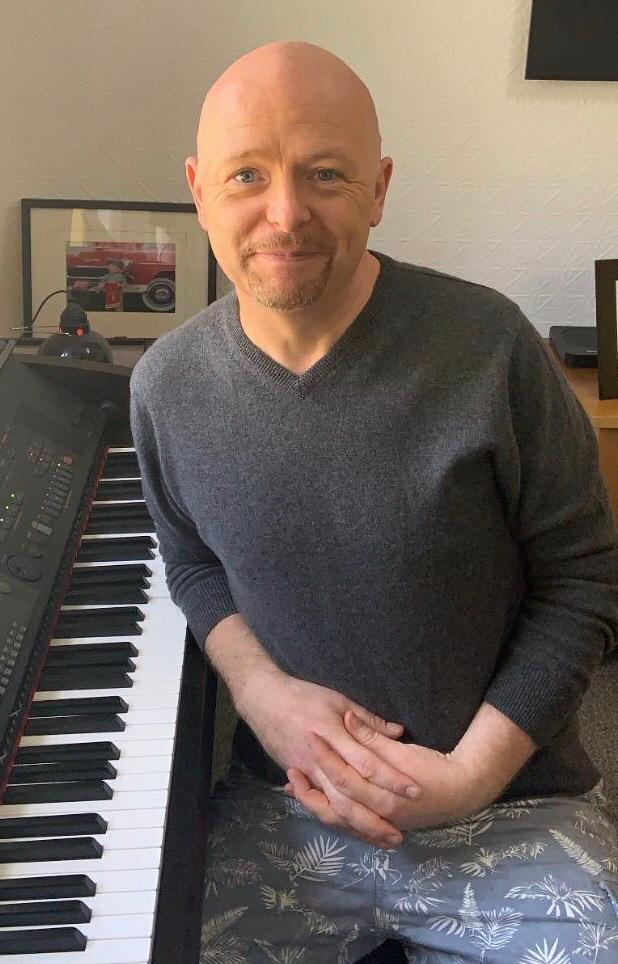
- Courtenay at home

Background information
- Born: 4 March 1973 (age 53); Mossley, Lancashire, England
- Occupations: Singer; pianist; entertainer; comedian
- Website: joncourtenay.com

Jon Young (born 4 March 1973) known professionally as Jon Courtenay is an English singer, pianist, entertainer and comedian, known for winning the fourteenth series of Britain's Got Talent, having previously been awarded the golden buzzer during his audition by presenters Ant & Dec. He was the first ever Golden Buzzer act to win in the history of the show.

== Early life ==
Courtenay is from Mossley and attended the Royal Hospital School

== Career ==
In 2020, Courtenay entered and won the 14th series of the ITV talent competition Britain's Got Talent, which took place during the COVID-19 pandemic. He wrote and performed a one-man musical at the Edinburgh Fringe Festival in 2022 and 2023.

== Personal life ==
Courtenay has two sons; Alfie (14) and Nathan (20)

During filming of Britain's Got Talent in July 2020, a suspicious mole on the left side of his head was found to be a melanoma. After treatment, he was given the all-clear by the end of the year. However, it was then discovered that the cancer had spread to his neck, which required major surgery and a course of treatment. This experience inspired a new show, Against The Odds, a one-man comedy musical that he took to the Edinburgh Fringe in 2022.

== Appearances ==
=== Television ===
Year	Title	Role	Notes
2020	Britain's Got Talent	Contestant	Series 14 Winner
2020	Royal Variety Performance	Guest Performer	
2020	Britain's Got Talent Christmas Spectacular	Guest Performer	
2021	Ant and Dec's Saturday Night Takeaway	Guest Performer	

=== Tours ===
Year	Show Title	Shows	Notes
2022	What's it all About?	32 UK dates	Postponed due to COVID-19 but advanced into 2022

Preceded by Colin Thackery	Winner of Britain's Got Talent; 2020	Succeeded by Axel Blake
