= Sirine Jahangir =

British musician, pianist and singer-songwriter

- Born: 2005 (age 20–21); London
- Occupation: Singer
- Known for: Britain's Got Talent (2020)
- Relatives: Junaid Jamshed (uncle); Fauzia Kasuri (aunt)

Sirine Jahangir (born 2005) is a blind British musician, pianist and singer-songwriter, known for her appearance on Britain's Got Talent 2020.

== Personal life ==
Sirine Jahangir was born and raised in Central London, to Kafeel Jahangir and Ghizlane. In 2010, she lost vision of left eye. At age 9, she lost full vision of both eyes. Her family moved to Mill Hill, North London when she was 12 years old.

Her grandfather is Sahibzada Jahangir, the spokesperson on Trade & Investment in UK & Europe for then-prime minister Imran Khan of Pakistan. Late Pop Star turned Islamic preacher Junaid Jamshed was her uncle. Fauzia Kasuri, a senior Pakistan Tehreek-e-Insaf politician is her aunt.

Sirine is ambassador of Graham Layton Trust, and has participated in several charity and music events such as; FFB Hope from Home and Coke Fest 2020.
