= Colin Thackery =

British Korean War veteran and singer

Colin Thackeray MBE
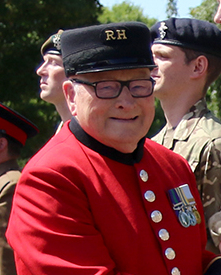
- Thackery in 2022

Background information
- Born: Colin Thackery; 9 March 1930 (age 96); Camden, London, England
- Occupations: Soldier; Singer
- Instrument: Vocals
- Years active: 2019–present
- Label: Decca

Warrant Officer Class 2 Colin Thackery (born 9 March 1930) is a British Korean War veteran and singer who won the thirteenth series of Britain's Got Talent in June 2019. As the winner, he received £250,000 and performed at the 2019 Royal Variety Performance. At 89, he became the oldest ever winner of the talent show.

== Career ==
Thackery served in the Royal Artillery of the Army, and saw service in Malaya and the Korean War. His medals represent this service, the General Service Medal with clasp Malaya; the Korea Medal and the United Nations Korea Medal.

In 2019, Thackery won Britain's Got Talent. At 89, he became the oldest ever winner of the talent show. He released an album, signing to Decca Records, alongside a tour across the UK.

In 2022, Thackery returned to the stage to perform a special medley for the Queen's Platinum Jubilee.

== Personal life ==
Thackery performed on an amateur basis throughout his life. As a boy, he sang in the church choir. In the Army, he took part in concerts on his troop ship on the way to Korea and, once there, was recruited to entertain the troops during a lull in the fighting. He also sang in a forces club when posted in Hong Kong. After retiring from the Army he joined a local operatic society.

A Chelsea Pensioner, he lives in the Royal Hospital Chelsea, where he moved after the death of his wife Joan in 2016, after 66 years of marriage.

== Discography ==
=== Albums ===
Title	Details	Peak chart positions
Title	Details	UK
Love Changes Everything	Released: 6 December 2019; Label: Decca; Formats: Digital download, streaming, CD	13

== Honours ==

Ribbon	Description	Notes
	Order of the British Empire	Member of the British Empire.
	General Service Medal	With "MALAYA" Clasp
	Korea Medal	
	United Nations Korea Medal	With "KOREA" Clasp

Preceded by Lost Voice Guy	Winner of Britain's Got Talent; 2019	Succeeded by Jon Courtenay
