= Ysgol Glanaethwy =

Performing arts school

Coordinates: 53.2064°N 4.1825°W

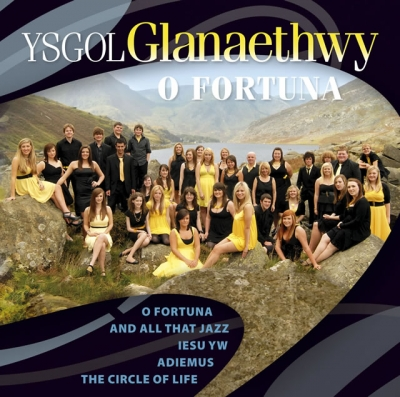
Album cover O Fortuna (2008)

Ysgol Glanaethwy is a drama school in Bangor, Gwynedd, Wales. It is known in particular for its choir, Côr Glanaethwy.

== History ==
Ysgol Glanaethwy was opened in 1990, founded by Cefin and Rhian Roberts. It is a performing arts school that operates outside normal school hours. Younger children take acting lessons and choir practice and the older pupils have choir practice only.

== Choirs ==
The school has three choirs: the junior choir, the senior choir and the 'Da Capo'.

In 2008, its senior choir competed on the BBC's 2008 competition series Last Choir Standing, finishing as the runner-up in the grand final behind fellow Welsh choir Only Men Aloud!.

In 2015 Côr Glanaethwy also reached the live finals of series 9 of Britain's Got Talent, finishing in third place.

In February 2018 the BBC controversially chose Côr Glanaethwy, instead of Bangor Cathedral's own choir, to sing during the St Davids Day edition of the Songs of Praise programme filmed at the cathedral.

== Awards ==
Glanaethwy have performed at the Royal Albert Hall's Schools Proms, and have won many competition prizes, including:

- 1st and 2nd in the National Eisteddfod of Wales
- Urdd Eisteddfod
- Music For Youth
- Finalists in Choir of the Year
- Second in Côr Cymru
- Second in Eisteddfod Llangollen (2010)
- First in Llangollen
