= Impossible (magic show) =

Magic show

- Original Poster
- Productions: 2015 West End; 2016 UK Tour; 2016 Beirut; 2016 West End; 2016 Dubai; 2017 Singapore

Impossible is a magic and illusion show which received its world premiere in London's West End at the Noël Coward Theatre on 24 July 2015. The production features a line-up of magicians who each specialise in different magical disciplines, supported by a team of assistants. The show was created by producer Jamie Hendry and directed by Lloyd Wood and Anthony Owen with original music by Ryan Martin and Michael Bradley.

== Productions ==
=== West End (2015) ===
The production made its world premiere at the Noël Coward Theatre in London's West End on 24 July 2015. In June 2015, it was announced that the cast would include Jonathan Goodwin (escapologist), Luís de Matos, Jamie Allan (magician), Ali Cook, Chris Cox (magician), Ben Hart (magician) and Katherine Mills. The production received mostly positive reviews.

=== UK Tour (2016) ===
In November 2015, it was announced that the production would tour the UK, opening at the Mayflower Theatre, Southampton on 3 February 2016. A major cast change took place with Josephine Lee, Magical Bones and Lee Thompson joining the cast, with Luís de Matos, Ali Cook, Jamie Allan (magician) and Aaron Crow all leaving.

=== Beirut (2016) ===
A production opened on 5 May 2016 at the Forum de Beyrouth in Beirut.

=== West End (2016) ===
In May 2016, it was announced that the production would return to London's West End and to the Noël Coward Theatre, opening on 13 July 2016. Sabine van Diemen joined the production.

=== Dubai (2016) ===
In September 2016, the production became the first West End show ever to open at the Dubai Opera.

=== Singapore (2017) ===
In March 2017, the production opened at the Kallang Theatre in Singapore.

=== Manila (2017-18) ===
On Christmas Day 2017 the production opened at the Smart Araneta Coliseum in Manila.

== Principal Magicians ==
West End (2015)	UK Tour (2016)	Beirut (2016)	West End (2016)	Dubai (2016)	Singapore (2017)	Manila (2017–18)
Jonathan Goodwin (escapologist)						
Ben Hart (magician)
Chris Cox (magician)
Luís de Matos						
Jamie Allan (magician)						
Ali Cook						Ali Cook
Aaron Crow					Aaron Crow	
	Josephine Lee					
	Magical Bones					
	Lee Thompson					
			Sabine van Diemen			
			Lance Corporal Richard Jones			
						Bello Nock

== Box office ==
During its five-week West End run in 2015 Impossible recouped its costs of just under £1 million.

== National TV Appearances ==
- The One Show - 8 July 2016 - A live performance by Ben Hart (magician) of close up magic and the transportation of an audience member.
- This Morning - 12 July 2016 - Jonathan Goodwin was interviewed by Holly Willoughby and Phillip Schofield. Magical Bones performed his signature backflip routine.
