= Hindi theatre =

Theatre performed in the Hindi language

Hindi theatre is theatre performed in the Hindi language, including dialects such as Braj Bhasha, Khari Boli and Hindustani. Hindi theatre is produced mainly in North India, and some parts of West India and Central India, which include Mumbai and Bhopal. Hindi theatre has its roots in the traditional folk theatre of North India, like Ram lila and Raslila, and also influenced by distant Sanskrit drama. Starting with Bhartendu Harishchandra in the late 19th century and subsequent playwrights like Jaishankar Prasad, Mohan Rakesh, Hindi theatre came of age in the 1940s and 50s, when IPTA movement created a new brand of theatre practitioners in Hindi speaking areas, especially with IPTA Mumbai, Prithvi Theatres of thespian Prithviraj Kapoor, and theatre artiste Habib Tanvir, paving way for next generation of artists who came out once National School of Drama, Delhi started functioning in 1959.

== History ==
=== Early history ===
The advent of Jainism and Buddhism and emergence of prakrit and Pali as a common language meant the lasting and definite end of Sanskrit as a spoken language though its theatre traditions continued to flourish but also gave birth to a synergistic traditions of Urdu and Hindustani languages, that developed in the aftermath of a fast amalgamating diverse cultures. Traditional folk theatre which included Ramlila, Raslila and nautanki had evolved despite the absence of royal patronage and where it was present, as in the case Ramlila of Kashi Kingdom, in Ramnagar, Varanasi, it evolved into a highly evolved form, with shifting locations. Elsewhere in Awadh, Wajid Ali Shah had been experimenting forms like thumri and stage style known as rahasa, it achieved a definite style in a play believed to be commissioned by him, Inder Sabha, an Urdu play by Agha Hasan Amanat, first staged in 1853.

Besides a separate tradition of Maithili plays, which flourished in the 17th century in present-day Bihar, North India had a pre-existing tradition of folk theatre, this included Braj Bhasa verse plays in the 18th century, Swang, the operatic tradition, which featured full-throated male singers and dancing by female impersonators, which evolved from reciting popular folk ballads and epics, and by the 1860s they were being performed across Meerut, Delhi and Banaras, and illustrated librettos, known as Sangits were being printed in Devanagari script. In the coming decades, it too got influenced by Parsi theatre, and further developed in content both thematic and music, in the 1890s onwards, which somewhere in the early 20th-century started being called nautanki, after the tale of a Nautanki Shahzadi became a popular theme. However this form lost much of its popularity and films made into road to rural area after the 1940s.

Meanwhile, with the discovery of Kalidas's Abhijnanasakuntalam by Western scholars, it became the first Indian drama to be translated into a Western language, by Sir William Jones in 1789. In the next a hundred years, there were at least 46 translations in twelve European languages. This in turn initiated a concerted study and interest of Sanskrit drama tradition. In time the full extent of ancient Indian theatre's prowess came into light, which had been long lost, as classical Sanskrit drama mostly written from the 4th and 8th century AD faded out, with death of Sanskrit as a spoken language by the 10th century, only to be discovered many centuries later.

Just as the first capital of British India, Calcutta, saw the rise of Bengali theatre in the light of the Bengal Renaissance during the early 19th century, at the same time Parsi theatre was coming up in Mumbai, inspired by English-style playhouses which had come up in the late 18th century in Mumbai and Kolkata, exclusively for the Raj gentry. Taking over the same proscenium stages, Parsi theatre took cue their European theatricality, but it brought in Indian themes, thus it "blended realism and fantasy, music and dance, narrative and spectacle, earthy dialogue and ingenuity of stage presentation, integrating them into a dramatic discourse of melodrama. The Parsi plays contained crude humour, melodious songs and music, sensationalism and dazzling stagecraft." Though it originally was in Gujarati language, by the 1870s, a flourishing Parsi theatre lead to the creation numerous travelling theatre companies, though they mostly used Indianised versions of Shakespeare's plays initially, soon Indian legends, epic and mythological tales made an appearance as source material, as Parsi theatre companies started travelling across North India, and employed native writers to churn out scripts in Hindustani the popular language in the territory, akin to Urdu, the court language in the Mughal era. These sources had also provided themes to the native Swang tradition, leading to cross-enrichment after Victoria Natak Mandali became the first Parsi theatre company to perform in Varanasi, in 1875. These theatre companies presented their mix of pure entertainment and nationalism during the Indian freedom struggle. This return of written dramatic text to theatre, after centuries, made Parsi theatre not just the role model for the first Indian talkies, as numerous Paris theatre producers moved to cinema, but also gave birth to a theatre tradition, that continued even after Parsi theatre died out as the talkies made their first appearance. Panned by Hindi litterateurs, Bhartendu and Mahavir Prasad Dwivedi, Parsi theatre through its veritable presence, however provoked the elite theatre of refinement as a clear reaction.

=== Modern Hindi theatre 1868 and after ===
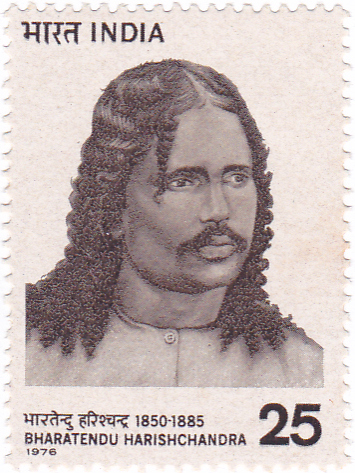
Bharatendu Harishchandra (1850–1885), a pioneer of modern Hindi theatre

Early development of modern Hindi theatre can be traced to the work of Bharatendu Harishchandra (1850–1885), a theatre actor, director, manager, and playwright based in Varanasi (Banaras), who is also the father of modern Hindi literature as in his short life of 35 years, he edited two magazines, Kavi vachan Sudha and Harishchandra chandrika, wrote numerous volumes of verse in Braj bhasa, essays and eighteen plays, thus laying the foundation of modern Hindi prose style. Well-versed in folk theatre styles and oral literary traditions of the region, he was influenced by the Bengal Renaissance, however his principle influence was the ancient Sanskrit Drama, many of which he translated and established a stream of dramaturgy which has run parallel to development of the Western drama, though he even translated a Shakespeare's play. Rooted in the rising tide of Indian nationalism, he is most noted for his politically charged plays like, Andher nagari (City of Darkness) written in 1881, a clear satire on the British Raj, as it implied that a society which tolerates a lawless state is doomed to fail. Eventually Bharatendu became director of Hindi Natak Samaj (Hindu National Theatre) in Banaras.

After Bhartendu whose productions were largely funded by himself or at times by Maharaja of Kashi, Hindi theatre went through a phase of struggle, due to lack of sponsors, impresarios or efficient theatre managers, thus there was hardly any professional theatre for many decades, discouraging writers to take to playwrighting, even works of important playwrights of this period, Jaishankar Prasad and Upendranath Ashk were mostly read, yet hardly staged. Prevalent conservatism didn't allow the female actors to take to stage and unlike Marathi theatre of Mumbai or Bengali theatre of Calcutta, Hindi theatre remained a struggling force, despite the presence of a large audience, which went to the extent of the entertainment-driven Parsi theatre companies. Only a handful of amateur theatre groups presented their works at improvised or makeshift stages, in a period when like many popular writers, intellectuals too had turned away from theatre. The arrival of talkies in 1931, with Alam Ara, meant outflow of Hindi theatre audience that had already dwindled away after the incursions by Parsi theatre across the Hindi-speaking belt. Soon theatre actors, director, writers and technicians followed suit, shifting to Mumbai, the base for Hindi cinema, where the promise of easy money from studios was too captivating to resist. As a result, numerous theatre companies and playhouses closed down and some started showing cinema, the new medium of the age. As the masses moved away from theatre, lured by the glitz of cinema, which Parsi theatre provided readily till now, theatre landscape was now populated by an educated and sophisticated audience, moving away from cinema in response to its escapism, looking for realistic and socially-relevant plays.

20th-century Hindi theatre received a fresh impetus through Indian People's Theatre Association (IPTA). Though formed in 1942, with left-wing ideologies, after the All India People's Theatre Conference was held in Mumbai in 1943, IPTA Mumbai was formed An important contribution of IPTA was that it was first time that women started taking part in theatre in such a number. It created and inspired a generation of theatre practitioners and playwrights, like Krishan Chander, Kaifi Azmi, Balraj Sahni, Mohan Segal, Dina Pathak, Shanti Bardhan, Durga Khote, and others, one of them was Prithviraj Kapoor who founded Prithvi Theatres, a travelling theatre troupe, based in Mumbai in 1944, with actors like Prithviraj himself, apart from Uzra Butt, and Zohra Sehgal. The group was largely funded by Prithviraj Kapoor's film career and functioned till in 1960, when Prithviraj Kapoor's ill health forced its closure before his death in 1972.

=== After independence ===
Sangeet Natak Akademi (SNA), The National Academy for Music, Dance and Drama, was established by the Government of India in 1952, to promote performing arts. Another big change in the realm of Hindi theatre was the establishing of National School of Drama (NSD) in Delhi in 1959, which had Bharatiya Natya Sangh (BNS) as its precursor. BNS, with the assistance from UNESCO, independently established the Asian Theatre Institute (ATI) in 1958, and in July 1958, ATI was taken over by the SNA, and merged with newly formed NSD, which initially functioned under SNA before it became an autonomous organisation. With its principal instruction language being Hindi, and stalwarts like Ebrahim Alkazi and Shanta Gandhi, in the coming decades it produced a number a noted theatre actors and directors. The National School of Drama Repertory Company was set up in 1964, with actor-director Om Shivpuri as its first head, followed by Manohar Singh, and other actors like Uttara Baokar, Sudha Shivpuri and Surekha Sikri. RADA-trained Alkazi turned out to be the most influential director in the post-independence period; his Hindi productions of Sanskrit classics, like Abhijnana Shakuntalam, Dharamvir Bharati's Andha Yug (1953), Girish Karnad's Tughlaq (1964), and the realism of his take on Mohan Rakesh's Ashadh Ka Ek Din (1958) brought a fresh approach to theatricality, and sophistication to Hindi theatre, and set up standards that inspired an entire generation. Alakazi's production of Dharamvir Bharati's Andha Yug premiered in 1964 at the Firoz Shah Kotla and was attended by prime minister Jawaharlal Nehru.

A pioneer of the modern theatre movement in North India was Raj Bisaria, who had a grounding in western classics and contemporary dramatic works, and worked to communicate through a new aesthetic medium. His plays were concerned with male-female relationships and social issues of special concern to him. Through his productions of European and Indian plays since 1966, Bisaria presented a wide spectrum of contemporary drama as a director and designer. He ventured to blend artistic concepts of the East and the West, both the traditional and the modern. It was his belief that theatre can be used for its therapeutic qualities for the personality development of youth, besides just being a vehicle for disseminating information, and can create consciousness about social and political issues. He began his work in English and began to use Hindustani as the spoken medium of expression beginning in 1973. He encouraged the Nautanki, the folk theatre form of Uttar Pradesh.

Raj Bisaria suggested to the State Government that he should start a semi-professional repertory theatre in Uttar Pradesh, in 1974 the State Government went a few steps further and requested him to evolve a scheme for establishing a drama school, which would function as a full-fledged academy of dramatic arts. Bhartendu Academy of Dramatic Arts (BNA), when it was founded in 1975, in Lucknow, (with Raj Bisaria as its founder director) became the first of its kind in the large Hindi belt of Bihar, Uttar Pradesh, Madhya Pradesh and Rajasthan. His major productions of Indian plays have included Dharamvir Bharati's Andha Yug, Badal Sircar's Baqi Itihas, Adya Rangacharya's Suno Janmejaya, Elkunchwar's Garbo, Mohan Rakesh's Aadhe-Adhure, Mohit Chatterjee's Guinea Pig etc. His major and memorable productions have included Maxwell Anderson's Barefoot in Athens; Shakespeare's Julius Caesar, Macbeth, Othello, King Lear; George Bernard Shaw's Candida; Harold Pinter's The Caretaker; Sartre's in Camera; Ionesco's The Lesson; Strindberg's Father, Jean Anouilh's Antigone; and various plays of Chekhov, Ionesco, Tennessee Williams, Shaffer and so on.

In the next few years, various states also formed their state academies for the arts, which gave boost to the theatre culture, and soon state capitals like Jaipur, Shimla, Chandigarh, Lucknow and Bhopal had their own theatre groups and culture. However, for many years to come, theatre largely remained driven by amateur groups, as full-time theatre did not become a financially viable activity. Most could not afford extensive props, scenery, lighting design, or newspaper advertisements and relied on word of mouth and small amount of postering. Many practitioners maintained regular jobs, either at educational institutions or in the corporate sector and rehearsed after working hours in hired spaces, as hardly any theatre group across Hindi theatre owned their own infrastructure, be it rehearsal space or theatre. Theatre directors often doubled as theatre managers, as impresarios were rare and impresario organisations even rarer, and then it was director's name that attracted the audience. As payments to cast and crew remained arbitrary and severely dependent on the success of the show, many picked up work in other mediums. As state funding was never available for theatre directly, practitioners tried to gain corporate sponsorship, or did "call shows" in other cities to raise money.

Gradually a number of theatre venues started coming up, both proscenium and experimental, including Shri Ram Centre, Kamani Auditorium (1971), Meghdoot theatre (designed by Alkazi), NSD studio theatre, SNA studio theatre, Abhimanch and many others. While many directors like Alkazi staged plays at historical monuments and various innovative venues, street theatre brought theatre out to the streets completely, including in its content. Just as IPTA-inspired Jana Natya Manch (JANAM) of Safdar Hashmi did in the 1970s and 1980 as did M. K. Raina, who staged his production of Maxim Gorky's The Mother in front of factories, inspiring many other practitioners to take theatre to the communities. The Bhopal gas tragedy (1984) saw a new wave of protest presentations in many cities, just as Bhisham Sahni wrote Muavze (Compensation, 1990) later staged by Raina. Eventually Hashmi was killed in 1989, while his production Halla Bol (Attack) was being performed in front of a factory in Sahibabad near Delhi by political goons. Though by this time street theatre had been discovered as an important tool and medium, with notable directors like Bansi Kaul and Prasanna, street theatre had reached prisons, slums and red-light areas.

Habib Tanvir is another pioneer in Hindi theatre, who first moved to Mumbai in 1943 from native Bilaspur looking for work in Hindi films that is when he came in contact with IPTA and Progressive Writers Association. He moved to Delhi in 1954 and joined hands with 'Hindustani theatre' of Begum Qudsia Zaidi, writer, and theatre director who had important impact on evolving theatre tradition in Delhi, who together with Habib Tanvir, made its debut with the production of a Hindustani version of Kalidas's Shakuntala and later produced Shudraka's Mrichakatika as Mitti Ki Gadi (Little Clay Cart) as an operatic version in nautanki-style, using tribal artists. He successfully wrote and directed Agra Bazar (1954), before he left for England. After his return from RADA, Habib began his work with Chhattisgarhi tribals, at the Naya Theatre, a theatre company he founded in 1959 in Bhopal, and went on to include indigenous performance forms such as nacha to create a new theatrical language, later he wrote Charandas Chor (1975), Gaon ka Naam Sasural, Mor Naam Damad and Kamdeo ka Apna Basant Ritu ka Sapna and notably staged, Asghar Wajahat's Jis Lahore Nai Vekhya, O Jamya E Nai (1990). Apart from him, B. V. Karanth too brought in folk forms into his work, staged many productions in Hindi, especially during his stint with the Rangamandal repertory at the Bharat Bhavan in Bhopal.

In the 1960s, like other parts of India, modern Hindi Theatre movement also started in Bihar. Satish Anand, actor and director, is the maker of modern Hindi theatre in Bihar. He is known as trend setter in contemporary modern Indian theatre. Satish Anand established his own theatre group Kala Sangam at Patna, capital of Bihar in 1962. Created a very healthy theatre environment and popularize Hindi plays and theatre by constantly and regularly staging plays like Dharmvir Bharti's Andha Yug, Mudrarakshash's Merjeeva, Mohan Rakesh's Adhe-Adhure, Ashadh Ka Ek Din and Lahron ke Rajhans, Badal Sircar's Baki Itihas, Ballabhpur Ki Roopkatha, Pagla Ghora and Juloos, vijay Tendulkar's Khamosh Adalat jari hai, Jat Hi Puchho Sadhu Ki, Gireesh Karnad's Tughlaq, Sophocles Greek tragedy Oedipus, Rambriksha Benipuri's Ambapali, Shanti Mehrotra's Thahra Hua Pani, Ek Tha Gadha, Kisi Ek Phool Ka Naam Lo, Godan, Chandrashekhar Kambar's Aur Tota Bola, Ibsen's Enemy of the people(Janshatru), Ben Johnson's Volpony (Chor Ke Ghar Mor), Delhi Uncha Sunati Hai, Manoj Mitr's Rajdarshan, Debashish Majumdar's Tamrapatra, Sushil Kumar Singh's Singhasan Khali Hai, Bertolt Brecht's Three Penny Opera ( Do Takkey Ka Swang), Jyoti Mahpseker's Beti Aayee Hai etc. Kala Sangam's director Satish Anand had taken every new production as a theatre workshop. He worked hard and trained actors-actresses in every department. Production of Adhe-Adhure in 1973 was considered a great happening in History of the cultural field of Bihar. This incident was considered as renaissance of theatre in Bihar. Kala Sangam always preferred to take up socio-political-economic issues in its plays. Variety in designing the play-productions with innovative ideas and high class powerful performances injected and created a keen interest for theatre among the people of Bihar. The conservative and orthodox society opened up slowly and started liberalizing their views about theatre and its actors-actresses. A large number of working women and school-college-going girls were allowed by their guardians and parents to participate actively in plays and they made their presence felt with their talents. Hundreds of boys and girls were trained by Satish Anand during these years. The quality and class of Kala Sangam's play-productions established Kala Sangam as one of the leading theatre group of India. Patna became of the most theatre-active centers of India in 70s, 80s and 1990s. Kala Sangam had organised its first theatre festival and first all India theatre Seminar in 1978. Kala Sangam presented its five plays, Andha Yug, Ashadh Ka Ek Din, Lahron Ke Rajhans, Ballabhpur Ki Roopkatha and Singhasan Khali Hai. The subject of the All India theatre seminar was "Aaj Ka Natak Aur Rangmanch" (Today's Drama & theatre) Mr. B.V Karanth, Dr. Pratibha Agarwal and Sachidanand Hiranand Vatsyayan were the guest speaker of this seminar. 2nd Kala Sangam's Theatre festival and All India theatre Seminar was organised in 1979. Scholar theatre critic Nemi Chand Jain, Dhyaneshwar Nadkarni had participated in the seminar and also witnessed plays presented in the festival. Kala Sangam had organised its nine theatre festivals from 1978 to 1995 respectively. Kala Sangam's work had inspired many people in Bihar to start theatrical activities in their respective places. In 1984 Satish Anand evolved a new theatre idiom 'BIDESIA STYLE' for Modern Indian theatre by using indigenous traditional folk theatre elements. Satish Anand started his research. Conceptualized the form and finalized its Format. Evolved a new Theatrical Idiom for Modern Indian Theatre 'BIDESIA' based on Lesser-Known Traditional Theatrical Folk Forms of Bihar, LAUNDA NAACH & NAACH PARTIES (With Special reference to Bhikhari Thakur's Naach Party), Traditional Songs, Traditional Music, Traditional Dances, Folk Culture, Life-Cycle, Rituals, Customs, Faith & Belief, Life styles, Habits, Behavior, Festivals & Celebrations etc. of Bihar. Format of BIDESIA style consists of Theatrical elements, chosen very carefully from above & creatively used in this style with contemporary & modern sensibility. Bidesia style is a new Theatrical Idiom (Rang Bhasha) of Modern Indian Theatre which works as a Bridge between Rural & Urban Theatre. Initially short stories written by Phanishwar Nath 'Renu', short stories by Mandhkar Gangadhar were read but at last one day a short story 'Amli' which was published in "Sarika" Hindi magazine was selected. Renowned Hindi Writer Kamleshwar was its Editor. Satish Anand liked that story and started work on it. He completely rearranged the incidents and sequences, created new characters, incidents and situations according to the thought format of Bidesia style. Bhojpri dialect was used in the play. Traditional music, songs & their tunes were selected according to the conflict, mood, feelings of the characters and situations. Best part of that Every actor of Kala Sangam contributed his knowledge and experience in Adaptation of a short story 'AMALI', Adaptation of a Shudraka's Sanskrit play 'MARICHCHHAKATIKA'(Mati Gari) and Phanishwar Natn's Hindi Novel 'MAILA ANCHAL in Bidesia Style. And in 1994, a new play Rabindranath Tagore's 'MUKTADHARA' Produced & presented in BIDESIA style. Kala Sangam also toured Delhi, Mumbai, Kolkata, Bhubaneshwar, Bhopal, Ujjain, Guwahati, Kota, Jaipur, Jodhpur, Bikaner, Hanuman Garh, Ganga Nager, Lucknow, Allahabad etc. with its plays. All these plays had been presented very successfully in various Zonal & National Folk Theatre Festivals organized in different parts of India respectively. This Bidesia style had been recognized by Theatre Practitioners and Theatre Critics & appreciated by audience throughout the country. Fascinating part is that this style has also influenced Modern Indian Theatre. Kala Sangam had staged Muktadhara in Bidesia Style in Bharangam, Delhi in 2000.

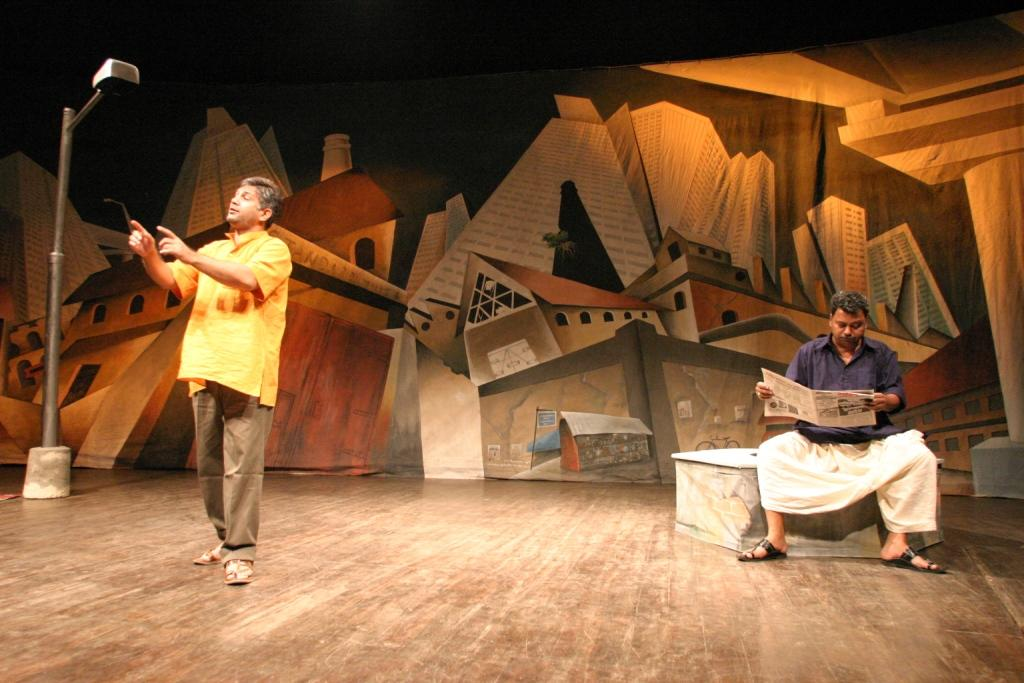
Performance of a Hindi play, Cotton 56, Polyester 84 by Sunil Shanbag about life in Girangaon, Mumbai, 2006.

Kolkata-based, Shyamanand Jalan (1934–2010) is credited for the renaissance period of modern Indian theatre and especially the Hindi theatre in Kolkata from the 1960s to the 1980s. He was the first to perform modernist Mohan Rakesh, starting with his magnum opus Ashadh Ka Ek Din (One Day in Ashad) in 1960 and in the coming years bridged the gap between Hindi theatre and Bengali theatre, by mounting Hindi productions of works by Bengali playwrights, like Badal Sircar's Evam Indrajit (1968) and Pagla Ghoda (1971), which in turn introduced Sircar to rest of the country. He co-founded theatre group Anamika in 1955 with Pratibha Aggarwal, a Hindi writer and a great granddaughter of Bhartendu Harishchandra, which played a pioneering role in the revival of Hindi theatre., and remained with it till 1972, and during this period it created a large audience for Hindi theatre in Bengali speaking Kolkata. Subsequently, along with his wife Chetana Jalan, the well-known Kathak dancer and stage actress, and actor Kulbhushan Kharbanda, he left Anamika in 1971 and established Padatik (literally foot-soldier) theatre group in 1972, of which he was the founding director. This gave him a chance to venture into bolder themes, like those in Vijay Tendulkar's plays like Gidhade (The Vultures) (1973) and Sakharam Binder (1979), and Mahashweta Devi's Hazar Chaurasi Ki Ma (Mother of 1084) (1978), with his new venture he stepped beyond Indianism, modernism, or experimentalism. Another theatre director, who practiced Hindi theatre in Kolkata, which is largely Bengali speaking area was Usha Ganguly (b. 1945), who founded Rangakarmee theatre group in 1976, known for its productions like Mahabhoj, Rudali, Court Martial, and Antaryatra. Apart from her, theatre directors like, Satyadev Dubey, Dinesh Thakur and Nadira Babbar also practiced Hindi theatre in Mumbai, till then home for Marathi and Gujarati theatre.

In the 1960s and 70s, many actors from National School of Drama started working in Hindi films, though many continued theatre activities on the side. Many theatre actors and directors, like Om Shivpuri, who had formed Dishantar theatre group in Mumbai, and Dina Pathak worked successful in mainstream cinema as well, while many others, along with FTII, Pune actors, made name in the Parallel cinema, which came of age in the late 1970s. This included, Sai Paranjpye, Om Puri, Naseeruddin Shah and Pankaj Kapoor. Most colleges now had their own theatre societies, which became breeding ground for future practitioners. Later in the 1980s, with increasing popularity of television soap operas, home videos and cable TV, audience moved away from theatre for a while, before theatre resurrected itself in the late 1990s with a new breed of theatre directors who sought not just new themes and narratives, but also took to absurd, expressionist, experimental and improvisational theatre with greater zeal. They also started to find sponsors in the corporate sector and numerous theatre directors were able to sustain themselves on theatre alone. Two challenges that came up in the coming years was that even now actors took their theatre careers as a prep for film careers, and secondly most theatre actors learned via working in theatre groups, as avenues of theatre education remained limited, though some organisation that opened in other cities beyond Delhi, like Jaipur, Lucknow, and Chandigarh, which had playwright-director Balwant Gargi guiding new phase of theatre, offered young aspirants to learn the craft.

At Bhopal theatre director and playwright Prof. Satish Mehta and his National Award-winning actor wife Jyotsna Mehta established the theatre group "Prayog". The group was founded in the year 1975 at Indore and later over the years, opened branches in Bhopal, Mumbai, Rewa, Noida and New Jersey, USA. Since then the group is active and staging the plays regularly. Well known plays of "Prayog" are "Andhon ka hathi", "Juloos", "Bakari" "Dulari Bai"," Jadugar jungle","Khamosh adalat jari hai","Ek aur Dronacharya", "Jis Lahore nahi Dekhya","Kajal ka jadu","Kandhe par baitha tha shap" "Mujhe Amrita Chahiye", "Raktbeej", "Rai" and many others. Satish Mehta directed all these plays with his own original style. He has got credit to perform many street plays, too. Prof. Satish Mehta has also authored many Plays. Few of which are, "Kajal ka Jadoo", "Jinda hai Sukrat", "Abhinay", "Door Desh ki Gandh", "Bharat ke Laal" etc. Prof. Satish Mehta's comprehensive book on theater, "Rangkarm Aayam Dar Aayam" is considered one of the finest work on the history, evolution, different genres and various other aspects of theater.

Mrityunjay Prabhakar is one of the major young Hindi theatre director and playwright who emerged on Indian Theatre Scene in the last decade of the 20th century and established himself as a significant theatre activist in first decade of the 21st century. He started his theatre career from Patna during his graduation days. He has worked with several theatre groups like Abhiyan, Prerna, Mach Art group and Prangan in Patna. Later, he co-founded the group Abhiyan along with his friends. When he arrived Delhi for his further studies in Jawaharlal Nehru University, New Delhi. Here he worked with famous groups like Rang Saptak, Bahroop and Dastak. Later he founded his own group named SEHAR in 2005 and started working rigorously. He has got trained under leading figures of Indian Drama and Theatre world through different workshops he attended like Habib Tanvir, B.V. Karanth, Prasanna, Ratan Thiyam, D. R. Ankur and many more. He has worked with directors like D.R. Ankur, Lokendra Arambam, H.S. Shiva Prakash, Surendra Sharma, Parvez Akhtar, Vijay Kumar, Javed Akhtar Khan, Suman Kumar and others. He has worked as an actor, director, set designer, light designer and organiser in theatre.

Mrityunjay Prabhakar works primarily as a Theatre Director and playwright with his group SEHAR. He is the founder-director of theatre troupe, SEHAR (Society of Education, Harmony, Art, Culture and Media Reproduction) (Registered under Society Act) in 2007. He has directed more than two dozens plays among them 'Sabse Udas Kavita'[2], 'Khwahishen' [3],'Jee Humen To Natak Karna Hai', [4],'Dhruvswamini'[5], 'Vithalala' and 'Suicide'[6] have got special attention from the larger section of the society. His plays has been performed in different cities and theatre centres of the country apart from Delhi. His plays were part of some of the important theatre festivals of the country.

Mrityunjay Prabhakar's originally written play Sadho Dekho Jag Baudana was published by InkLit Publication. He has also written plays Aao Natak Natak Khelen, 'Khwahishen', 'Jee Humen To Natak Karna Hai', 'Suicide', 'Hey Ram', 'Teri Meri Kahani Hai', 'Karnav' and others, which has been performed by different groups and directors in various theatre centres of the country. He has adopted famous Keniyan playwright Ngugi Wa Thiong's play 'The Black Hermit' as 'Jayen To Jayen Kahan'. The adoptation was first performed by NSD Graduate Randhir Kumar in 2005 in Patna. Later he reproduced the play in 2010 with SEHAR in Delhi. He has adopted H.S. Shivaprakash famous Kannad play 'Mochi Madaiah' in Hindi which was directed by Lokendra Arambam and published by Yash Publication, Delhi. An anthology on Contemporary Indian Theatre titled 'Samkaleen Rangkarm' is also credited on his name published by InkLit Publication. His Hindi Poetry Collection 'Jo Mere Bheetar Hain' was published by Akademi of Letters (Sahitya Akademi), India.

In the 21st century, modern Hindi theatre has continued to evolve through large-scale stage productions. Founded by Rahul Bhuchar in 2017, Felicity Theatre is known for productions such as Humare Ram and Mahabharat: The Epic Tale. The company has performed across major Indian cities and at the Dubai Opera.

== Hindi playwriting ==
Bhartendu's father wrote a play titled, Nahul natak in 1859, which is the "first Hindi drama of literary scope in the modern period", though there is little record of its staging. The first drama to be staged was Shital Prasad Trivedi's Janaki mangal at Banaras theatre, also known as purana nachghar, in 1868, in which Bhartendu himself made his stage debut as an actor, and in the coming years he wrote prolifically wrote eighteen plays till his death in 1885. Pre-Bhartendu period, had created mostly mythological and epic inspired plays like, Hanuman-natak, Amasya sar natak, Vichitra natak, Shakuntala upakhyan, Anand Raghunandan and Inder sabha.

Just as Bhartendu Harishchandra wrote Satya Harishchandra (1875), Bharat Durdasha (1876) and Andher Nagari (1878), in the late 19th century, Jaishankar Prasad became the next big figure in Hindi playwriting with plays like Skanda Gupta (1928), Chandragupta (1931) and Dhruvswamini (1933), Maithili Sharan Gupt also wrote three plays, Tilottama (1916), Chandrahaas (1921) and Anagha (1925). The next phase of important plays after Prasad, came with Badrinath Bhatt, next it was Lakshminarayan Mishra's work which broke away from existing pattern of subject treatment and presentation and is known for its realism, and unmistakable influence of Ibsen as seen in Sansyasi (1931), Raksha Ka Mandir (1931), Mukti ka rahasya (1932), Rajyoga (1934) and Sindoor ki Holi (1934), which tackle social problem with marked directness. An important event in this period was establishment of Hans, a literary magazine based in Varanasi, by noted writer Premchand in 1938, which published numerous important one-act plays in the coming years, further giving boost to the craft.

In the 1930s one-act plays became a prominent organizational structure in Hindi theatre. Playwrights who excelled in this format included Ganeshprasad Dwivedi (Suhag bindi, 1935), Bhuvneshwarprasad (Karvan, 1935), and Satyendra (Kunal, 1937) Of particular importance was the poet, playwright, critic, and historian Ram Kumar Verma who wrote several successful one act plays, including Prithviraj ki ankhen (1936) and Reshmi tai (1941). Verma's play Charumitra (1941 or 1942) is considered a masterpiece of modern Hindi drama.

=== 1940s and beyond ===
As the Independence struggle was gathering steam playwrights broaching issues of nationalism and subversive ideas against the British, yet to dodge censorship, they adapted themes from mythology, history and legend and used them as vehicle for political messages, a trend that continues to date, though now it was employed to bring out social, personal and psychological issues rather than clearly political.

Post-independence the emerging republic threw up new issues for playwrights to tackle and express, and Hindi playwriting showed greater brevity and symbolism, but was not as prolific as was the case with Hindi poetry or fiction. Yet playwrights such as Jagdish Chandra Mathur (Konark) and Upendranath Ashk (Anjo Didi) emerged, who displayed a steadily evolving understanding of thematic development, theatrical constraints and stagecraft. Gyandev Agnihotri also became known for his use of symbolism, wit and satire, as evidenced in Shuturmurg, written in the 1960s, before moving into screenwriting for Hindi films in the 1970s.

The first important play of the 20th century was Andha Yug (The Blind Epoch), by Dharamvir Bharati, which came in 1953, found in Mahabharat, both an ideal source and expression of modern discontent and predicament of a society riddled with corruption. Starting with Ebrahim Alkazi it was staged by numerous directors. With his verse play Uttar Priyadarshini, Agyeya found the story Ashoka's redemption, reflecting the modern call for peace. Ashadh Ka Ek Din (One Day in Ashadh), the debut play of modernist Mohan Rakesh was published in 1958, based on the life of Sanskrit dramatist Kalidas, and is considered the first Modern Hindi play. Mohan Rakesh went on to write two more plays, Aadhe Adhure (Halfway House) and Leheron Ke Raj Hans (Great Swans of the Waves) and left one, Paon Taley Ki Zameen (Ground beneath the Feet) unfinished by the time of his death in 1972, but he had shifted the landscape of Hindi theatre. Today, his rise as a prominent playwright in the 1960s is seen as the coming of age of Modern Indian playwriting in Hindi, just as Vijay Tendulkar did it in Marathi, Badal Sircar in Bengali, and Girish Karnad in Kannada. His plays have now become classics of Indian theatre, have been performed by almost every major Indian theatre director and have been part of the university curriculum in Hindi-speaking areas.

Initially inspired by western dramaturgy, in structure and movement, many initial playwrights adapted Ibsen and Brecht, but soon returned to roots and found both content and form, giving birth to the movement called "theatre of the roots", a concerted attempt to 'decolonise' Indian theatre and distance itself from western theatre. Be it Habib Tanvir's Agra Bazar (1954) and Charandas Chor (1975), which brought in new indigenous forms of expression, On the other hand, there were younger playwrights like Surendra Verma, with his Surya Ki Antim Kiran Se Surya Ki Pahli Kiran Tak (From Sunset to Sunrise, 1972), Draupadi and Athwan sarga (Eighth Chapter, 1976), rapidly experimented with forms and formats, and writers who ventured into playwrighting to produce important works, like Bhisham Sahni who has been associated with both IPTA and Progressive Writers Association, most noted for his partition-novel Tamas wrote, Hanush (1977), Madhavi (1982) and Muavze (1993).

Over the years the repertoire of Hindi plays has expanded to include translated and adapted works of successful playwrights from other languages, like Vijay Tendulkar, Girish Karnad, Mahesh Elkunchwar, G. P. Deshpande and Badal Sircar (Evam Indrajit, 1963, Pagla Ghoda, 1967).

Danish Iqbal's Dara Shikoh is a modern classic which was staged by director M S Sathyu. In the words of noted critic Ramesh Chand Charlie Dara Shikoh is a turning point of traditional theatrical sensibilities. Use of Wali Deccani's period poetry provides this Play with a very rare artistic and historical context. Dazzling use of Kathak choreography by Rani Khanum and her Troupe, and authentic costumes including head gear, swords and period art work was a treat for the eyes. This Play had a good run at cities like Delhi, Gurgaon and Bangalore.

Another notable Drama of Danish Iqbal is Dilli jo ek Shehr Thaa depicts the life and times of a Delhi lost during the invasion of Nadir Shah. He was awarded Mohan Rakesh Samman for this Play by the Chief Minister of Delhi Sheila Dikshit. Recently this Play was staged by Bharti Sharma of Kshitij Group and had Delhi audience mesmerised by its production values and grandeur.

Danish also wrote Sahir' on the life and times of Sahir Ludhyanvi which was staged in Delhi for a packed audience and became a landmark production for the use of old film songs as part of Dramatic Narrative. Directed by NRI Director Pramila Le Hunt this play became a commercial success and had audience wishing more and more of Sahir. Danish Iqbal also wrote Kuchh Ishq Kiya Kuchh Kaam on the life and work of legendary poet Faiz Ahmed Faiz and Sarah Ka Sara Aasman on the poet Sarah Shagufta, besides the biographical Drama 'Ghalib' which used Ghalib's poetry for the basic narrative and was staged at Dubai for the expatriate Indian Community. Danish had also given the block buster 'Woh Akhiri Hichki' and 'Ek Thi Amrita'(on the life and times of Amrita Pritam) and some other early works. In recent years he has been using lot of elements of Cinema and mass media to bring theatrical sensibilities closer to the audiences fed with lot of Bollywood. It is a pity that his collected work is not available till now although few versions of 'Dara Shikoh' and 'Ghalib' are available but Dara Shikoh being a costly historical costume Drama it is not easy to stage such a demanding production. 'Dilli Jo Ek Shehr Thaa' has all the markings of a classic stage play combining high voltage conflict with realistic characterisations, treacherous conspiracies, romance, poetry, dances and catchy dialogues.

Sayeed Alam is known for his wit and humour and more particularly for Plays like 'Ghalib in New Delhi' 'Big B' and many other gems which are regularly staged for massive turn out of theatre lovers. Maulana Azad is his magnum opus both for its content and style.

Shahid's 'Three B' is also a significant Play. He has been associated with many groups like 'Natwa' and others. Zaheer Anwar has kept the flag of Theatre flying in Kolkata. Unlike the writers of previous generation Sayeed, Shahid, Danish and Zaheer do not write bookish Plays but their work is a product of vigorous performing tradition.

Dramatech, a Delhi-based theatre group formed by alumni of IIT Delhi in 1984, gave a new dimension to Hindi theatre by translating and staging many English classic plays, both musicals and straight plays. These included Hindi versions of musicals Fiddler on the Roof and Hello Dolly! and plays Agatha Christie's Ten Little Niggers & Witness for the Prosecution; A Conan Doyle's Sherlock Holmes stories; Joseph Kesselring's Arsenic and Old Lace. All these were translated, lyrics and directed by Ravi Raj Sagar, in the period 1984–87 and then 2002–12.Reference: www.dramatech.in

The group's same director also adapted and staged classic stories by Premchand in play Premchand: Three comedies for families and Children in 2012. Stories included in this were Do bailon ki katha, Shatranj ke khiladi, Nimantran.Ref: Review in Deccan Herald: http://www.deccanherald.com/content/269668/premchand-children.html Also: www.dramatech.in An interview with Director Ravi Raj Sagar on Premchand's works and Hindi & Urdu Literature was published in The Times of India: http://articles.timesofindia.indiatimes.com/2012-10-02/books/34216836_1_munshi-premchand-stories-comedy-genres

Vibha rani is a noted playwright of two Indian languages- Hindi and Mainthili. So far she has written more than 20 full length group, duet and solo plays. Her play "Doosra Aadmi, Doosari Aurat" has been awarded with Vishnudas Bhave Award for Playwriting by the Govt. of Maharashtra, 2011. The play was put up in BHARANGAM, 2002 of National School of Drama, New Delhi & currently being staged by various groups across the country. Another play "Peer Parayee" is being staged in and around the country by "Vivechana", Jabalpur from 2004 onwards. "Aye Priye Tere Liye" was staged in Mumbai. "Life is not a Dream", Balchanda", "Main Krishna Krishn Ki", "Ek Nayi Menka", "Bhikharin", "Naurangi Natni", "Bimb- Pratibimb" are her solo plays, being staged in & around the world. "Aao Tanik Prem Karen" and "Agle Janam Mohe Bitiya Naa Kijo" had won 1st prize of Mohan Rakesh Samman, 2005. "Aao Tanik Prem Karen" had been awarded as the Best play, 2013 and Vibha as the Best female Actor, 2013 by the Govt. of Maharashtra.

== Theatre criticism ==
On the other hand, theatre criticism which had also begun with Bhartendu, saw new voices emerging in the mid-20th century, like Lakshmi Narayan Lal, which were now subjecting recent Indian playwriting to touchstone of Ibsen and other western masters. Leading theatre critics were now employed by national dailies, this included Ramesh Chander and Nemichand Jain, and soon a second generation theatre criticism came to the fore in the 1960s, with Kavita Nagpal, Jaidev Taneja, and others. Literary journal also started having sections devoted to theatre criticism and many magazines now ran theatre review columns. In this period, a theatre journal Natrang edited by NC Jain started publishing, similar journal were brought out by state-run academies like, Sangit Natak by Sangeet Natak Akademi in Delhi, Rangyog at Rajasthan Academy in Jodhpur, and Chhayanat by Uttar Pradesh Academy in Lucknow. Another important development was the rise of documentation, academic research in various streams of Indian theatre by increasing number of theatre scholars, like Kapila Vatsyayan, Anuradha Kapoor and N C Jain.

== Hindi theatre groups ==
Name	Location	Year of establishment	Founding director
Darpan	Kanpur and then Lucknow	1961 in Kanpur and 1972 in Lucknow	Prof Satyamurti Presently Nishtha Sharma General Secretary of Darpan Kanpur NATYANGAN KANPUR Founded by Rakesh Dugg & Junior wing of Darpan Kanpur in 1981. Awadhesh Kumar Misra Reorganized NATYANGAN in 2016 with the fellow members of Darpan Kanpur. Started staging plays under the direction of renowned Thespian Sangeet Natak akademi award winner, Dadasaheb Phalke awardee Ranjit Kapur. Ek Ghora Chhah Sawaar, Surajmukhi aur Hamlet, Panchlite and Sab Thaath pada rah jayega. NSD allumini Yashraj Jadhav directed the most acclaimed nautanki and musical classic Katha Nandan Ki in a totally different form. One of the best musical play in which Ustad Ghulam Dastgeer Khan's best music compositions and heart touching performances of Rakesh Verma, Ravi Vaidya and Vijay Bannerji, along with the leading crowd that was the real hero made the musical.play immortal. The then in 1980it was directed by Ms Tripurari Sharma and Ravi Sharma.The Nautanki adaptation in Hindi msutanki form of Indraparthadarathi'Tamil play was done by Late Siddheshwar Awasthi. In 1917 on the behest of Ravi Sharma, the rehearsal of Katha nandan Ki was started with totally new team. But because of Ravi Sharma's busy schedule he couldn't come to direct this musical classic.Hence it was Yashraj Jadhav who got an opportunity to redesign it in new digital era. He did but couldn't touch the sensitivity of the previous production. Although it was up to the mark but not a super duper production. Afterwards Ranjit Kapoor gave a new concept in Surajmukhi aur Hamlet. It also won thousands applause.
Prayog	Indore, Bhopal, Rewa, Mumbai, Noida, New Jersey	1975 in Indore, 1983 in Bhopal, 1985 in Mumbai, 1991 in Rewa, 1992 in Noida, 2012 in New Jersey, USA	Prof Satish Mehta and Mrs. Jyotsna Mehta Prayog is a well-known Hindi theatre group of India. It was established on 15 August 1975 by Prof. Satish Mehta and his wife Mrs. Jyotsana Mehta. The first play performed by Prayog was Doosara Darwaja (Writer - Dr. Laxmi Narain Lal) and this theater group has never looked back ever since. It has gone from strength to strength putting up 1500+ performances to date of 100 full-length plays. Prayog is a Hindi language word, which means experimentation. As the meaning indicates Prayog is different in the sense that and it puts up its plays with experimentation in content, format and presentation. The plays seek to throw new and different light on social and political issues. Prayog's constant endeavor is to bring a fresh viewpoint. The remarkable factor in the plays performed by Prayog is the variety in form and way of presentation. Few Prayog plays are as follows: a. Folk style Plays: Dulari Bai, Bakri, Jadugar Jungle, Rai b. Comedy Plays: Saiya Bhaye Kotwal, Langdi Tang, Sharafat teri to, Adalat Ashiko ki, Badbad Savitri. c. Political and Social satire: Andhon Ka Hathi, Natak Nahin, Ala Afasar d. Social Plays: Pratibimb, Mansukh Lal Majithhiya, Hastakshar e. Period Plays: Jis Lahore nahi dekhya, Ek aur Dronacharya f. Mythological Plays: kandhe par baitha tha shap g. Psycho-physical Plays: Bhoma With its liking for purposeful theater, Prayog has broken new grounds with street plays as well - "Julus", "Samarath", "Bharat Ke Lal" and "Kargil Ke Sher" were performed to aware the public with different motives. The themes of these plays were patriotism, non-violence, national integration, communal harmony and other social causes. These street plays attracted a large number of people on the streets and conveyed the message effectively to them. Prayog has a remarkable record of presenting its Plays throughout India and in USA as well. Prayog has a brigade of very talented artistes, who support the very cause for which Prayog was established and has been working ever since. Prayog has established a good name in the field of theater and continue to rise to greater heights.
Kala Sangam	Patna, Bihar	1962	Satish Anand
Swatantra Theatre	Pune, Maharashtra	2006	Abhijeet Choudhary and Dhanashree Heblikar with Yuwaraj Shah Abhijeet Choudhary with Dhanashree Heblikar and Yuwaraj Shah founded Swatantra Kala Group in Pune in 2006. The group focuses on contemporary and socio-political issues through its numerous performances and practices. It has performed at various public and private institutes of education including FTII, IITs, and NDA. It is known for its repertoire of community-based theatre and was invited by the UK Parliament for engaging in community-service through theatre. Some of its noteworthy productions are Jis Lahore Nahin Vekhya Wo Janmeya Hi Nahin- Asghar Wajahat, Tajamhal Ka Tender- Ajay Shukla, Mujhe Amrita Chahiye- Yohesg Tripathi, Kabira Khada Bazar Mein- Bhishm Sahni, Court Martial- Swadesh Deepak, Gagan Damma Bajiyo -Piyush Mishra, Jab Shehar hamara sota hai, Bakri-Sarveshwal Dayal Sharma, Ujbak Raja Teen Dacoit- Alakhnandan, and many more. Abhijeet Choudhary, Dhanashree Heblikar Written Plays like Mashaal jao Diye Se, Tenaliram, Tukaram, Turning Pages with Sudha Murthy, DadaSaheb Phalke "Play Based on Father of Indian Cinema", Mansarovar Play based on Premchand's Short Stories, Bikhre Moti Play BAsed on Subhadra Kumari Chauhan's Life and her writings, Rabindra Sansar Play Based on Life of Rabindranath Thakur and his work and many more. Jaag Utha Hai Raigad is a Hindi translation of Vasant Kanetkar's Marathi play Raigadala Jevha Jaag Yete Performed in 21st Bharat Rang Mahotsav 2020. Woven within the play is an inbuilt, terse and fine sense of controlled dramatic tension. It depicts the Maratha King, Shivaji and his youngest son, Sambhaji struggling with the gap between the two generations. Shivaji's efforts are to keep his family united, and the young descendant's efforts are to control and consolidate the huge legacy and empire. The play unveils the rich Maharashtrian culture, and the heritage of a bygone era.
Nat Nimad	Khandwa, M.P.	2000	Vijay Soni
Felicity Theatre	Delhi/NCR, Mumbai, Dubai	2017	Rahul Bhuchar; Established in 2017 with the vision of reviving commercial Hindi theatre by producing large-scale plays with high production values.; Notable productions include: * Historical dramas: Humare Ram (starring Ashutosh Rana), Mahabharat: The Epic Tale (starring Puneet Issar).; * Social & contemporary dramas: Jab We Separated, Wrong Number, and Patte Khul Gaye.; * Musical & devotional productions: Kun Faya Kun.; The group has staged performances internationally, including at the Dubai Opera.
