= Ben Hart (magician) =

English magician (born 1990)

- Born: 19 October 1990 (age 35); London, England
- Education: Kings' School and Peter Symonds College
- Occupations: Magician; illusionist; magic consultant; writer
- Years active: 2007–present
- Website: benhartmagic.com

Benjamin Hart (born 19 October 1990) is an English magician. In 2007, he was awarded the "Young Magician of the Year" award by The Magic Circle. Hart has worked on British television and is an inventor and designer of magic tricks and stage illusions. In 2014, he starred in Killer Magic on BBC Three. Hart was a finalist on Britain's Got Talent in 2019 finishing in third place. He is a member of The Magic Circle (organisation) (Member of The Inner Magic Circle with Gold Star)

== Television career ==
In 2014, Hart wrote and starred in Killer Magic on BBC Three which was awarded "Best Non-Competitive Reality Show" at the National Reality Television Awards. In 2016, Hart starred in Ben Hart's Life Hacks on BBC Three the first episode of which was directed by Matt Edmondson, and later Ben Hart's Life Hacks with The Voice which saw him pranking the celebrity judges of The Voice UK, including Boy George, Paloma Faith and Ricky Wilson of the Kaiser Chiefs. Hart also appeared in a regular slot within Now You See It on BBC One hosted by Mel Giedroyc. Other television credits include The Sorcerer's Apprentice for CBBC, Lorraine, The One Show for BBC One where Hart teleported a human to the top of Broadcasting House, Partners in Rhyme hosted by Len Goodman for BBC One, and ASAP, and Umagang Kay Ganda live in the Philippines. He has also presented his favourite music videos on Myx. For BBC Click and Objective Productions, Hart created the "world's first 360 magic trick" for the Royal Television Society. Hart has also performed his magic live on the radio for BBC Radio One and has created advertising campaigns for Trident, Nicorette, Costa Coffee, and Sky TV. He has appeared multiple times on This Morning (TV programme).

In 2019, Hart auditioned for series thirteen of Britain's Got Talent. His first round aired on 11 May 2019, and he was later selected by the judges as one of the 40 acts to perform in the live semi-finals. On 30 May, he won the public vote at the fourth semi-final and competed in the final against 10 other acts on 2 June. He came in third place on the show. During the judge's feedback, David Walliams described Ben as "the living embodiment of magic".

In September 2019 Hart competed in BGT: The Champions. In January 2020 Hart appeared in America's Got Talent: The Champions. Ben Hart appeared in the 2020 "Britain's Got Talent Christmas Spectacular. Hart appeared in the BBC magic show "Pure Magic". In 2024 Hart appears in series 17 of Britain's Got Talent as part of Magicians Assemble, alongside Elizabeth, Colin McCleod, and Aidan McCann.

Hart appeared as a guest expert talking about magic in the Victorian era and Charles Dickens in the 2023 David Harewood documentary Dickens: Phantoms and Fiction.

== Theatre ==
Hart has written and performed seven solo shows, each premiering at the Edinburgh Festival Fringe. He is known for his unusual performance style that mixes unusual, original magic with storytelling and theatricality, his performance style having been described as somewhere between Hannibal Lecter and Tim Burton. His shows include:

- The Outsider (2013) (directed by Anthony Owen, the executive producer of Derren Brown) which was nominated for the Time Out and Soho Theatre TO&ST cabaret award.
- The Vanishing Boy (2014) (co-written by Al Joshua)
- Belief? (2017) which was a total sell-out and appeared on The Scotsman's list of top magic shows at the Edinburgh Fringe Festival 2017.
- The Nutshell (a highly unusual magic show inspired by the work of Frances Glessner Lee) which was critically acclaimed, running at the Edinburgh Fringe 2018 and The Adelaide Fringe Festival
- "Wonder" (2020) A 65 Date UK tour
- "Ben Hart: Jadoo" (2023), a show based on traditional Indian magic. In "Jadoo" Hart goes back to his roots to explore his Indian heritage. The show premiered at the Edinburgh Fringe and toured the UK, and France. The show was unique in magic for its staging as Theatre in the round
- "Ben Hart: Hex" premiered at the 2024 Edinburgh Festival Fringe and saw Hart curating his favourite material from his decade of Fringe performances.

Since 2015, Hart has performed as part of Impossible produced by Jamie Hendry, playing two seasons at the Noël Coward Theatre in London's West End, Dubai Opera, Singapore, and Smart Araneta Coliseum in the Philippines.

Hart has also performed his act at The Royal Albert Hall, London Palladium, Wembley Arena.

Hart was awarded Best Magic Show of the Adelaide Fringe Festival 2022.

In 2025, Hart participated in Saudi Arabia's Riyadh Comedy Festival, an event characterized by Human Rights Watch as an effort by the Saudi government to whitewash its human rights abuses.

== Magic consultant ==
As a magic consultant and illusionist, Hart has written and created magic tricks and special effects for TV, theatre and film. His credits include Trick Artist for Channel 4 starring Benjamin Earl, The Egg Trick starring Ian McKellen, Killer Magic for BBC Three, BBC1's Now You See It, and Not Going Out.

Hart is the co-author of The Darkest Corners, a specialist book for magicians that explores some of Hart's routines and performance theory.

Hart was the magic and pickpocketing consultant for Mission: Impossible – Dead Reckoning Part One

Hart's special effects design credits include:

- Mind Mangler: Member of the Tragic Circle by Mischief Theatre
- Bagdad Cafe adapted and directed by Emma Rice for The Old Vic
- The Mirror and the Light by Hilary Mantel and Ben Miles
- Magic Goes Wrong by Mischief Theatre and Penn and Teller
- The Exorcist directed by Sean Mathias
- I and You directed by Edward Hall
- A Christmas Carol (2017) adapted by David Edgar for the Royal Shakespeare Company,
- Fanny and Alexander by Stephen Beresford at The Old Vic
- Dracula by The Touring Consortium
- Woyzeck (2017) adapted by Jack Thorne and starring John Boyega for The Old Vic
- WILD (2016) by Mike Bartlett at the Hampstead Theatre
- Wonderland by Gyles Brandreth (a musical about the life of Lewis Carroll)
- Out of My Head (2013) by Paul Merton
- The Arthur Conan Doyle Appreciation Society by Steven Canny and John Nicholson for Traverse Theatre
- Darker Shores at The Hampstead Theatre

== Awards and accolades ==
- The Magic Circle's Young Magician of the Year in 2007
- The Magic Circle's Irving Schneider Award Scholarship
- The Magic Circle's Marvin Rising Star 2018 awarded by Marvin Berglas
- National Reality Television Awards "Best Non-Competitive Reality Format" for Killer Magic
- Time Out and Soho Theatre TO&ST cabaret Award nominee 2013
- Bank SA Best Magic of The Adelaide Fringe 2022
