= John Achkar =

Lebanese stand-up comedian (born 1990)

- Born: November 10, 1990 (age 35); Beirut, Lebanon
- Occupations: Stand-up comedian, entrepreneur
- Years active: 2019–present
- Website: https://www.johnachkar.com

John Achkar (Arabic: جون أشقر; born November 10, 1990) is a Lebanese stand-up comedian from Beirut, Lebanon. He is known for his Arabic-language comedy, which often explores themes related to the Arab diaspora, marriage, cultural identity, and work life. Achkar has toured internationally, performing across Europe, Australia, North America, and the Middle East and North Africa region, including the GCC countries.

== Career ==
John Achkar has performed at several international venues, including the Olympia, the Casino de Paris, as well as Montreal, the Dubai Opera, and the Enmore Theatre in Sydney.

Achkar participated in the 2023 Dubai Comedy Festival and gained wider recognition after excerpts from his stand-up performances circulated widely on social media platforms.

In 2023, Achkar premiered his second comedy special, Wen 3ayish. The show explores themes of divorce, life in Dubai, and adapting to life within the Lebanese diaspora. The tour included performances in Lebanon, Jordan, Canada, and several European cities, and concluded with a series of sold-out performances at the Dubai Comedy Festival.

Later in 2023, Achkar debuted his third comedy special, Shou Zakeh?!. The show toured extensively across the Gulf region, Europe, Australia, Canada, and the Middle East. The tour was performed entirely in Arabic for international audiences.

Achkar's fourth comedy special, Aam Jarrib, focuses on experiences associated with life in one's thirties, including remarriage, personal uncertainty, and everyday social pressures, while reflecting on broader social dynamics within Lebanese society.
