= New English Shakespeare Company =

English theatre company

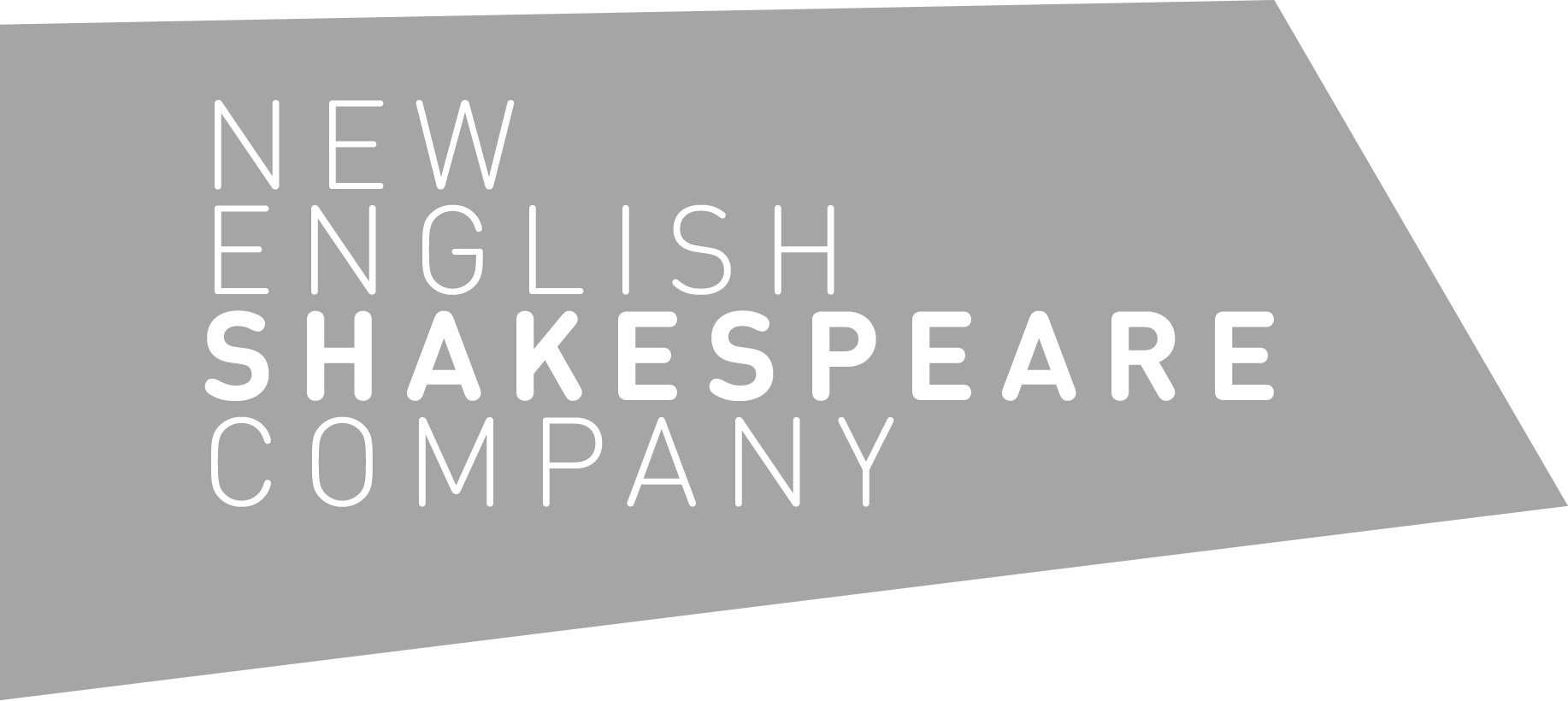
- Industry: Theatre
- Founded: 2019
- Founder: Jamie Hendry
- Headquarters: London
- Area served: Worldwide
- Website: nesc.org.uk

New English Shakespeare Company is an English theatre company founded in 2019 by producer Jamie Hendry to present modern takes on the works of William Shakespeare on a global level. Its inaugural production of Much Ado About Nothing was directed by Derek Bond and opened at the Dubai Opera in September 2019 before embarking on an international tour.

== Productions ==
=== Much Ado About Nothing ===
Much Ado About Nothing premiered at the Dubai Opera in September 2019, directed by Derek Bond, with designs by James Perkins, lighting design by James Whiteside, music by Tayo Akinbode and movement by Lucie Pankhurst.

The production was well received with Time Out reviewing it as "Nothing short of phenomenal".

2019 Original Cast
Role	Actor
Ursula	Geri Allen
Leonato	James Clyde
Don John / Dogberry	Samuel Collings
Benedick	Simon Darwen
Beatrice	Kirsten Foster
Hero	Adele James
Balthasar / Verges / Friar	William Pennington
Claudio	Daniel Reid-Walters
Borachio	Adam Sopp
Don Pedro	Obioma Ugoala
Margaret	Zoe West
