= Chris Cox (magician) =

British mentalist magician

- Born: 21 January 1984 (age 42); Bristol, England
- Occupation: Magician Psychological Illusionist/Mentalist
- Website: https://magiccox.com

Chris Cox (born 21 January 1984 in Bristol) is a mentalist magician – a self-proclaimed "mind reader who can't read minds". On television he stars in Chris Cox's Mind Blowing Magic on CBBC & BBC iPlayer and is "The Geek" in the award-winning Killer Magic on BBC Three. He stars in touring stage show The Illusionists and in the West End in Impossible. In his radio career Cox was the writer and producer for Matt Edmondson on BBC Radio 1 and the assistant producer on The Chris Moyles Show.

Since 2015 Cox has starred as The Mentalist in The Illusionists starring on Broadway, London's West End and on multiple US Tours. He performed as part of their 2015 season at the Moon Palace Arena in Cancun, 2018 sold out South Africa tour at The Grand West Arena (Cape Town) and The Teatro at Montecasino Johannesburg and the 2018 US Tour performing at venues such as Starlight Theatre (Kansas City, Missouri), Fox Theatre (St. Louis) and Bass Performance Hall.

In December 2018 and January 2019 he starred in The Illusionists Australian Tour at Canberra Theatre, Sydney Opera House. Queensland Performing Arts Centre and Regent Theatre, Melbourne. In 2019 he starred in The Illusionists Experience, a 3 month residency in Reno, followed by a run at the Shaftesbury Theatre in London's West End. He went on to headline The Illusionists - Magic Of The Holidays at the Neil Simon Theatre on Broadway before touring the US throughout 2020, 2022, 2023 and 2024.

In 2018 his CBBC and BBC iPlayer series "Chris Cox's Mind Boggling Magic" launched with ten episodes where Chris reads the minds of children and some of the stars of The Dumping Ground including Annabelle Davis.

Cox performed his first major show – entitled Chris Cox He Can Read Minds? – at the 2006 Edinburgh Festival Fringe. Cox's second show, Everything Happens for a Reason ran at the Gilded Balloon during the 2007 Fringe before a one-off performance at the Arts Theatre in London's West End. His show Chris Cox : Control Freak premiered at the 2008 Edinburgh Festival Fringe at the Pleasance after which it had a UK Tour and finished with a performance at the Southbank Centre in London.

His next show, Chris Cox: Mind Over Patter, was premiered at the King Dome of the Pleasance during August 2009. It gained Cox the Fest Buzz Twitter of the Year Award. Cox took highlights of the show to the Royal Opera House for a weekend of shows in September 2009. During the 2009 Edinburgh Fringe, he took part in Mark Watson's 24 Hour Show performing mind-reading stunts. While at the Edinburgh Fringe, he played the role of Eric Randolf in the Fringe First award-winning The Hotel. Mind Over Patter went on to tour the UK in Spring 2010 before a run at the 2010 New Zealand Comedy Festival.

The 2011 show for the Edinburgh Fringe Festival was called Fatal Distraction. He took the show on an international tour. Fatal Distraction won the 2011 Venue Magazine award for Best Comedy Show, beating Daniel Kitson (3rd) & The Bath Comedy Festival (2nd.).

Cox performed as part of Robin Ince & Friends at the 2009 TAM London event and again at TAM 2010 supporting his friend Tim Minchin. He appeared as part of Dick & Dom's Funny Business on BBC Two in February 2011. He produced a documentary on Minchin for BBC Radio 1 in December 2011. Cox and Minchin appeared together in an article about their friendship in The Independent in Spring 2012.

In April 2012 it was announced that Cox was developing a television show with SyFy with the working title of The Chris Cox Project.

In 2014 Cox starred in BBC Three's Killer Magic. In 2014 he appeared with Heston Blumenthal on Heston's Recipe For Romance for Channel 4; this was the start of Cox's creative relationship with Blumenthal. He is a creative consultant for Heston and The Fat Duck, developing magic and theatrical effects to go alongside the dining experience.

For five weeks over the summer of 2015 Cox starred in the new West End show 'Impossible (magic show)' at the Noël Coward Theatre. He went on to tour the show round the UK in 2016 as well as star in second West End season before taking the show to Dubai Opera, Kallang Theatre (Singapore), Beirut and a Christmas Season at the Smart Araneta Coliseum in Manila.

The Guardian has called him "One of the most exciting entertainers in Britain" and Time Out once said he "does tricks that would make Jesus proud".
