= Charumitra =

Charumitra may refer to:

- Charumitra (play), a 1940s play by Ram Kumar Verma
- Empress Charumitra, a fictional character in the television program Chakravartin Ashoka Samrat.
- Charumitra, an alternative spelling of the historical figure Charumati
