= Jamie Hendry =

British theater executive

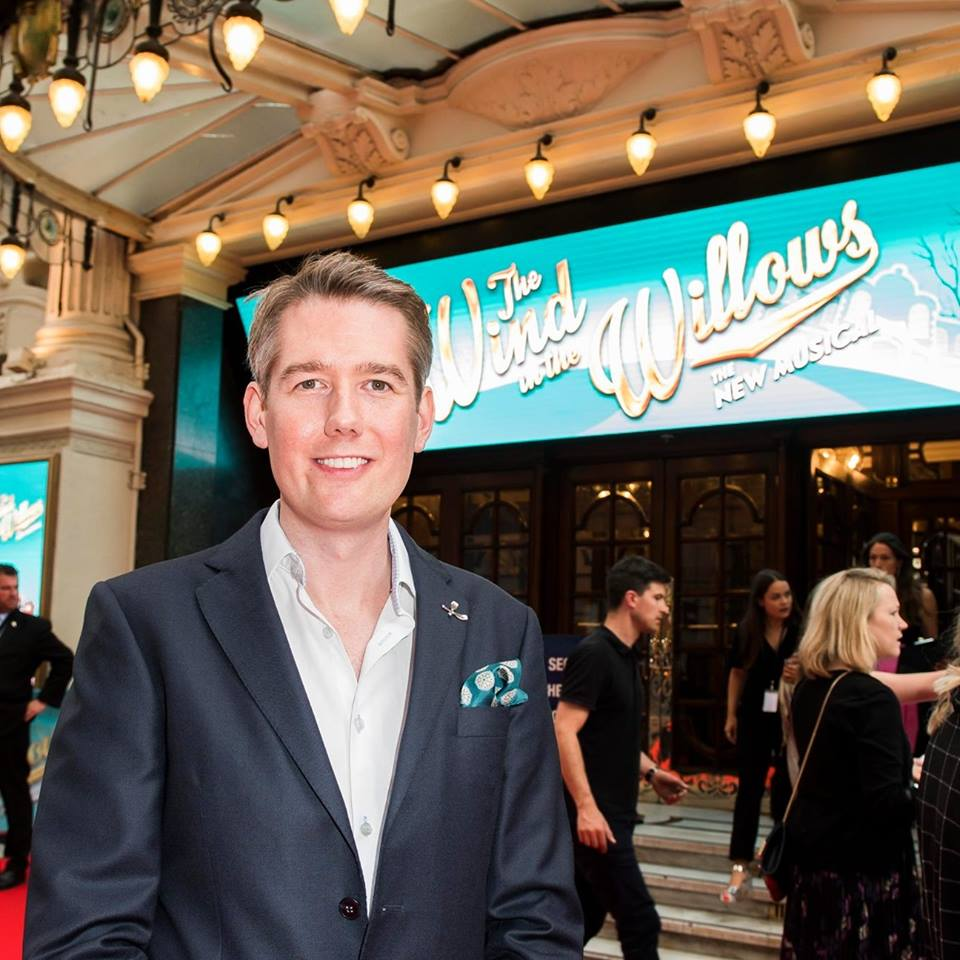
- Hendry at The Wind in the Willows Gala in June 2017
- Born: 24 July 1985 (age 40); London, England
- Education: Warwick University
- Occupations: Theatre producer, executive
- Years active: 2009–present
- Organization: Jamie Hendry Productions Creative House Management New English Shakespeare Company
- Known for: The Musical, Let It Be and La Cage aux Folles (2008 West End revival).
- Website: www.jamiehendryproductions.com

Jamie Hendry (born 24 July 1985) is a British theater executive, manager, and producer.

Born in London, Hendry attended St. Paul's School and graduated from Warwick University in 2006.

== Career ==
Hendry established Hendry Productions in 2008 after working as an assistant producer in the West End and on Broadway. In 2013, he publicly solicited grassroots investors in order to raise £1 million for a new musical adaptation of The Wind in the Willows, with book by Julian Fellowes and music and lyrics by George Stiles and Anthony Drewe. The production opened at the London Palladium in 2017.

In 2019, Hendry launched the New English Shakespeare Company, an international touring company, with a production of Much Ado About Nothing at the Dubai Opera in September 2019.

Hendry is a member of the Society of London Theatre.

== Theatre credits ==
Year	Production	Theatre
2023	Accidental Death of an Anarchist by Dario Fo, adapted by Tom Basden	Sheffield Theatres, Lyric Hammersmith & Theatre Royal Haymarket
2019	Much Ado About Nothing by William Shakespeare	Dubai Opera, Dubai
2018	Impossible	The Big Dome, Manila
2017	The Wind in the Willows by Julian Fellowes, George Stiles and Anthony Drewe	London Palladium
2017	Impossible	Kallang Theatre, Singapore
2016	The Wind in the Willows by Julian Fellowes, George Stiles and Anthony Drewe	Theatre Royal, Plymouth
2016	Impossible	Noël Coward Theatre, Dubai Opera, Dubai, Forum de Beyrouth, Beirut
2016	Stanley Clarke and Hiromi Duo	London Palladium
2015	Impossible	Noël Coward Theatre
2015	Let It Be	Garrick Theatre
2015	The Rocky Horror Picture Show 40th Anniversary	Royal Albert Hall
2014	Neville's Island by Tim Firth	Duke of Yorks Theatre
2014	Let It Be	Garrick Theatre and UK Tour
2013	Let It Be	Savoy Theatre
2012	Let It Be	Prince of Wales Theatre
2012	Soho Cinders	Soho Theatre
2011	Legally Blonde: The Musical	UK Tour
2010	Legally Blonde: The Musical	Savoy Theatre
2010	Birdsong	Comedy Theatre
2010	Onassis by Martin Sherman	Novello Theatre
2009	Spring Awakening	Novello Theatre
2009	Little Shop of Horrors	UK Tour
2009	The Last Five Years by Jason Robert Brown	Duchess Theatre
2009	Tick Tick Boom by Jonathan Larson	Duchess Theatre
2008	La Cage aux Folles (2008 West End revival)	Playhouse Theatre
2008	No Man's Land by Harold Pinter	Duke of York's Theatre
2008	Under the Blue Sky by David Eldridge	Duke of York's Theatre
2008	That Face by Polly Stenham	Duke of York's Theatre
2007	The Last Five Years by Jason Robert Brown	Apollo Theatre

== Film credits ==
Year	Title	Notes
2018	The Wind in the Willows	Producer

== Awards ==
=== Laurence Olivier Awards ===
- 2009 Best Musical Revival La Cage aux Folles (2008 London revival)
- 2010 Best New Musical – Spring Awakening
- 2011 Best New Musical – Legally Blonde: The Musical

=== Critics' Circle Theatre Awards ===
- 2008 The Peter Hepple Award for Best Musical – La Cage aux Folles (2008 London revival)
- 2009 The Peter Hepple Award for Best Musical – Spring Awakening

=== Whatsonstage Theatregoer's Choice Awards ===
- 2009 The Nick Hern's Books Best New Play – Under the Blue Sky
- 2011 Best New Musical – Legally Blonde: The Musical
