= Killer Magic =

- Genre: Magic Game show
- Created by: Anthony Owen
- Voices of: Matt Edmondson
- Country of origin: United Kingdom
- Original language: English
- No. of series: 1
- No. of episodes: 7 (inc. pilot)

Production
- Running time: 30 minutes
- Production company: Objective Productions

Original release
- Network: BBC Three
- Release: 24 March – 28 April 2015

Killer Magic is a British reality television series that shows five magicians competing against each other in tasks. A pilot aired on 1 April 2014 with a full series to follow on 24 March 2015. It is narrated by Matt Edmondson.

The five contestants taking part in the pilot are Ben Hart, Dee Christopher, Damien O'Brien, Jasz Vegas and Chris Cox.

== Production ==
The series was commissioned by Zai Bennett and Alan Tyler, and made by Objective Productions. Anthony Owen is the creator and also one of the executive producers. The other executive producer is Andrew Newman and the producer is Toby Stevens. A pilot episode was filmed and all six episodes were due to be shot in front of a studio audience. However, the full series is instead presented identically to the pilot with guests invited for each trick and the only audience being the contestants themselves.

== Transmissions ==
Series	Start date	End date	Episodes
Pilot	1 April 2014		1
1	24 March 2015	28 April 2015	6

=== International broadcast ===
The series premiered in Australia on 3 April 2015 on FOX8.
