= Paolo Petrocelli =

Italian cultural manager and music director

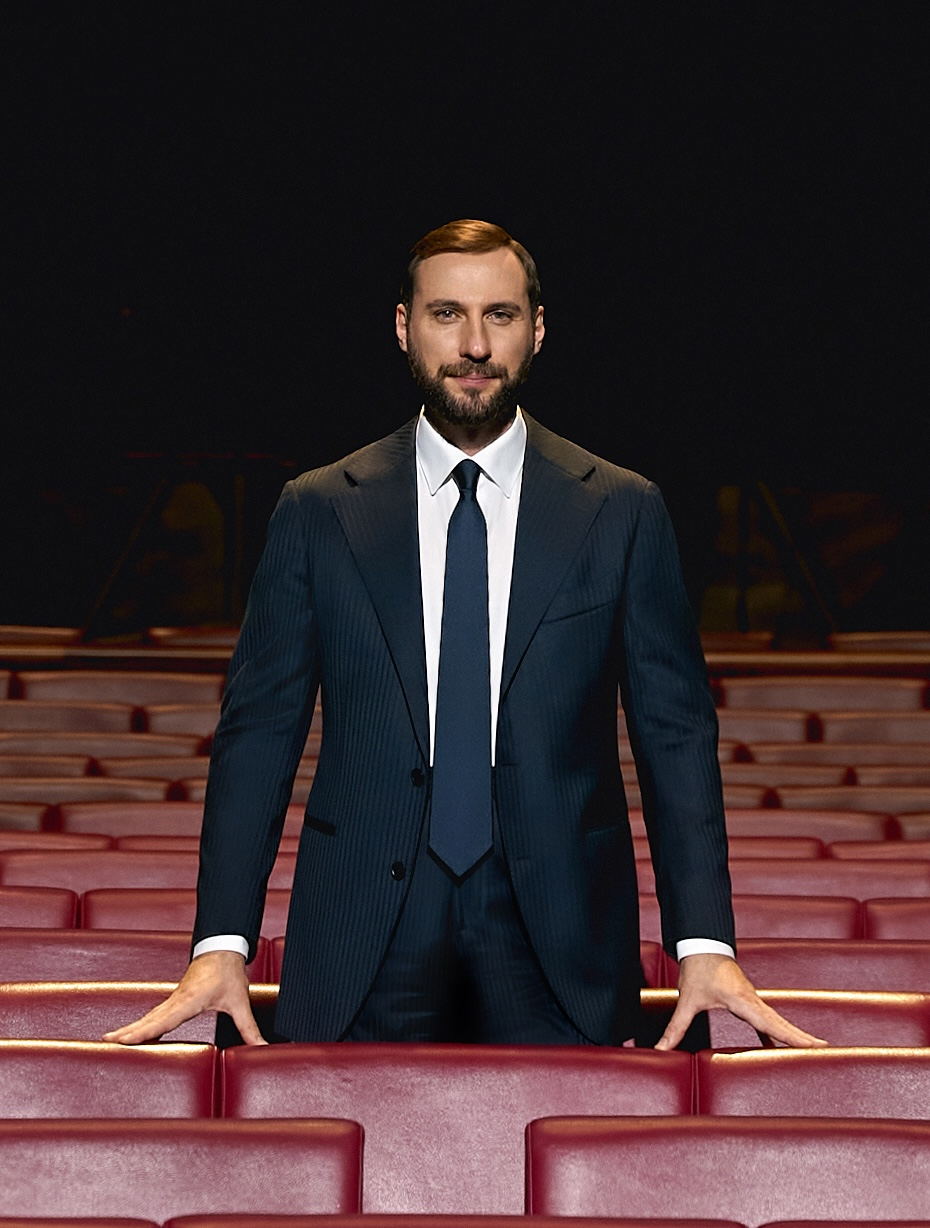
- Born: 1984 (age 41–42); Rome, Italy
- Occupation: cultural manager
- Website: www.paolopetrocelli.com

Paolo Petrocelli (born 1984) is an Italian cultural manager and academic. He is the Head of Dubai Opera.

== Early life and education ==
Petrocelli was born in Rome in 1984. He studied violin performance at the Conservatorio Santa Cecilia and musicology at Sapienza University. In 2011–12 he was a visiting fellow at Yale University, studying the manuscripts of composer William Walton.

He received his PhD in cultural economics in 2018 from IULM University of Milan. He also completed an Executive MBA at SDA Bocconi School of Management.

== Career ==
Petrocelli's early career included work with Italian music institutions such as Accademia Nazionale di Santa Cecilia and the Orchestra Italiana del Cinema, where he served as vice president. He later joined IMG Artists as an associate director. In 2011, he was appointed a youth delegate to UNESCO. He subsequently founded the Italian Youth Association for UNESCO and served as Cultural Diplomacy Officer for the World Summit of Nobel Peace Laureates.

He founded EMMA for Peace in 2012 and co-founded Opera for Peace, "the largest global platform supporting young opera professionals". Beginning in 2015 he was Assistant to the Superintendent at the Rome Opera House. He also served as an advisor at Royal Opera House Muscat.

In 2020 he was appointed director of the Walter Stauffer Academy in Cremona, Italy. In this role, he was the first director of the Stauffer Center for Strings, which opened 1 October 2021 in the restored Palazzo Stauffer. During his tenure, he expanded the school's teaching staff, developed institutional partnerships with the Juilliard School, Oxford University, Yale University, Harvard University, and the Royal College of Music, and introduced new academic and cultural initiatives.

In 2023, Petrocelli was appointed Head of the Dubai Opera. In his first year the opera had over 250,000 attendees, a record for the company. His tenure has been marked by the expansion of artistic programming, community engagement, and international partnerships. Under his direction, the Dubai Opera presented the United Arab Emirates premieres of the La Scala Theatre Orchestra and the Rome Opera Ballet, as well as productions like Grease and Wicked. According to Arabian Business, "his leadership is characterised by a blend of cultural enrichment and community engagement, positioning Dubai Opera as a central hub for artistic excellence and social cohesion".

Petrocelli is a research affiliate at Harvard University, leading a project in the metaLAB unit on the future of performing arts. He has taught at Bocconi University, John Cabot University, and New York University. He was also a cultural advisor for Coldplay.

== Honours ==
- European Young Leader, 2022
- Fellow, Salzburg Global Seminar
- Young Global Leader, World Economic Forum, 2023
- Arabian Business 30 Under 40, 2024
- Fast Company Middle East's Most Creative People in Business, 2024
- Knight of the Order of Merit of the Italian Republic, 2024
- Arabian Business Dubai 100, 2025

== Works ==
- Petrocelli, Paolo (2010). The resonance of a small voice: William Walton and the violin concerto in England between 1900 and 1940. Cambridge Scholars. ISBN 978-1443817219.
- Petrocelli, Paolo (2024). The Evolution of Opera Theatre in the Middle East and North Africa. Cambridge Scholars. ISBN 978-1036436070.
