= Let It Be (musical) =

Musical

- Let It Be, Garrick Theatre, 2015
- Music: Lennon–McCartney, Harrison, Starr, Medley/Russell
- Lyrics: Lennon–McCartney, Harrison, Starr, Medley/Russell
- Basis: Musical career of The Beatles
- Premiere: 24 September 2012: Prince of Wales Theatre. London
- Productions: 2012 Prince of Wales Theatre, West End; 2013 Broadway; 2013 Savoy Theatre, West End; 2013 Germany Tour; 2014 UK Tour; 2014 Japan Tour; 2014 Garrick Theatre, West End; 2022 Atlantic City, New Jersey

Let It Be is a West End and Broadway concert revue based on the career of English rock band, The Beatles, from 1962 to their breakup in 1970.

== History ==
The production debuted at the Prince of Wales Theatre on 24 September 2012 with previews from 14 September 2012. Its run at the venue ended on 19 January 2013, after which it moved to the Savoy Theatre and opened on 1 February 2013. The Broadway production started previews on 13 July 2013 with its official opening night taking place on 24 July 2013, running for a limited engagement at the St. James Theatre until 1 September 2013. The production opened on UK tour in Manchester in February 2014 the show returned to the West End opening at the Garrick Theatre on 9 July 2014. The production is produced by Jamie Hendry Productions & Annerin Productions. In August 2022, the show had a limited run at the Hard Rock in Atlantic City, New Jersey.

== Synopsis ==
The show begins with the four actors portraying an early version of The Beatles' appearance at The Cavern Club in 1962. When this scene closes, The Beatles journey to America beginning their tour with their appearance on The Ed Sullivan Show is depicted. Moving forward, The Beatles' directions are changing musically while their band grows in popularity performing their largest concert at New York City's Shea Stadium. Subsequent scenes use hallucinogenic and psychedelic designs to further progress the representation of The Beatles' ever increasing experimentation with substances and eastern theory. The show culminates with the breakup of the group in 1970.

The structure of the West End and Broadway productions were essentially similar, The only major difference was the West End production featured a scene with the cast re-enacting The Beatles' 1963 Royal Variety Performance at the Prince of Wales Theatre, in place of The Ed Sullivan Show.

== Cast ==
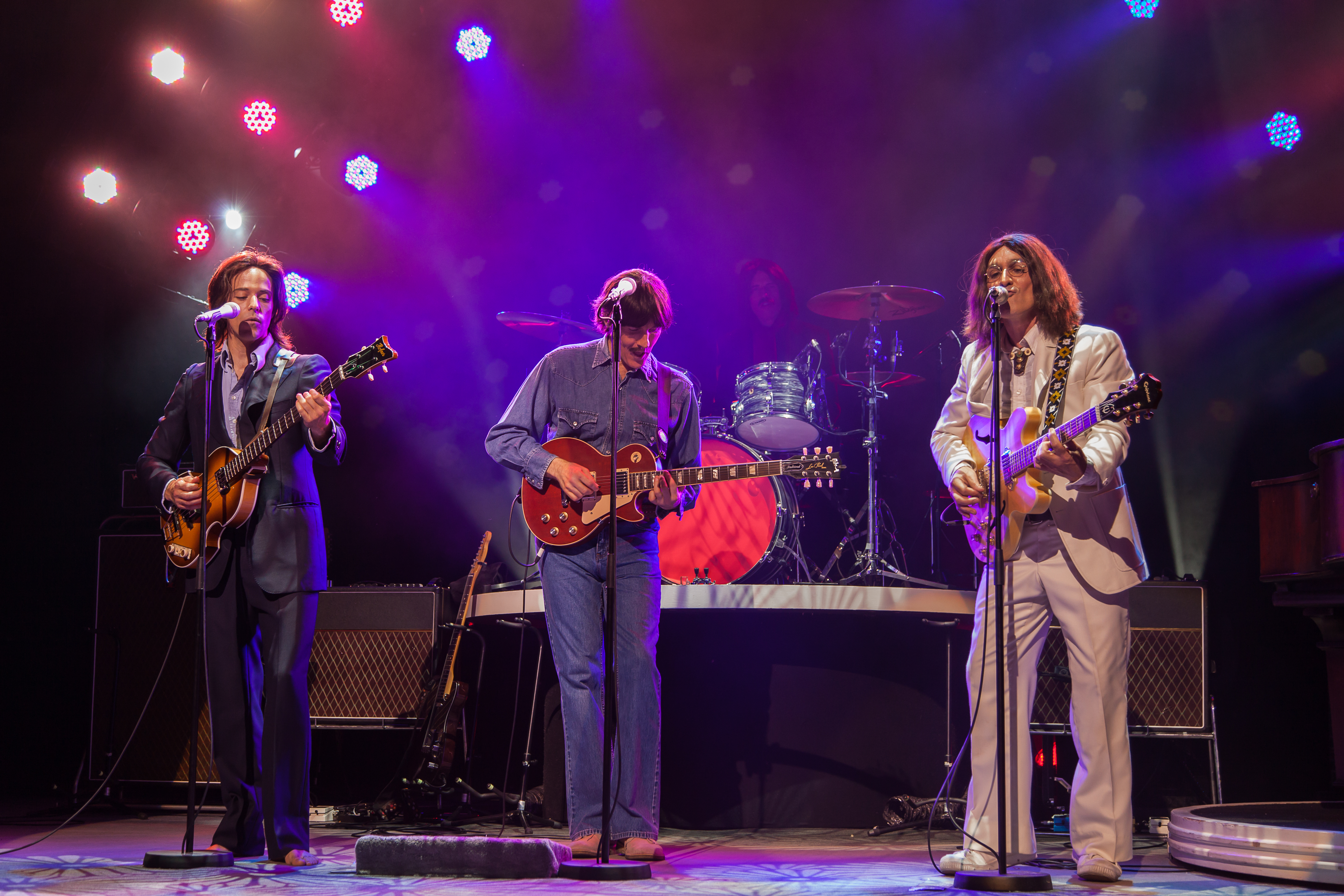
Performance of the "Let It Be" musical at the Savoy Theatre in 2013

The Broadway and West End companies each feature multiple casts, who alternate performances.

Original West End Cast	Original Broadway Cast	Original UK Touring Cast
Emanuele Angeletti; John Brosnan; Gordon Elsmore; James Fox; Michael Gagliano; Ian Garcia; Reuven Gershon; Stephen Hill; Phil Martin; Ryan Alex Farmery; Michael Bramwell	Graham Alexander; John Brosnan; Ryan Coath; JT Curtis; Ryan Alex Farmery; Reuven Gershon; James Fox; Tyson Kelly; John Korba; Chris McBurney; Luke Roberts; Daniel A. Weiss; Roberto Angelelli	Emanuele Angeletti; John Brosnan; Ben Cullingworth; James Fox; Michael Gagliano; Reuven Gershon; Stephen Hill; Luke Roberts; Michael Bramwell; Paul Mannion; Peter John Jackson

== Setlist ==
Act I

Cavern set

- "I Saw Her Standing There"
- "Please Please Me"
- "It Won't Be Long"

Royal Variety/Ed Sullivan set

- "She Loves You"
- "I Want to Hold Your Hand"
- "All My Loving"

A Hard Day's Night set

- "A Hard Day's Night"
- "Can't Buy Me Love"
- "Do You Want to Know a Secret"
- "I Wanna Be Your Man"
- "Yesterday"

Shea Stadium set

- "Help!"
- "I Feel Fine"
- "Ticket To Ride"
- "Drive My Car"
- "Twist And Shout"
- "Day Tripper"

Sgt. Pepper's Lonely Hearts Club Band set

- "Sgt. Pepper's Lonely Hearts Club Band"
- "With A Little Help From My Friends"
- "Eleanor Rigby"
- "Lucy in the Sky with Diamonds"
- "When I'm Sixty Four"
- "Sgt. Pepper's Lonely Hearts Club Band (Reprise)"
- "A Day in the Life"

Act II

Magical Mystery Tour set

- "Magical Mystery Tour"
- "All You Need Is Love"
- "Penny Lane"
- "Strawberry Fields Forever"

Unplugged set

- "Blackbird"
- "Two of Us"
- "We Can Work It Out"
- "Norwegian Wood (This Bird Has Flown)"
- "Here Comes The Sun"
- "In My Life"
- "The Long and Winding Road"
- "While My Guitar Gently Weeps"

Abbey Road/rooftop set

- "Come Together"
- "Get Back"
- "Revolution"
- "The End"

Encore

- "Give Peace A Chance"
- "Back in the USSR"
- "Let It Be"
- "Hey Jude"

== Reception ==
The musical received mixed to positive reviews from both West End and Broadway critics with The Daily Telegraph stating that "For those who love the Beatles, this show is as about as good as it gets."

== Lawsuit ==
In 2013, the producers of the long-running Beatles tribute show Rain: A Tribute to the Beatles filed a copyright suit against the producers of Let It Be. Rain claimed that in 2005 they and the Let It Be producers agreed to produce a Broadway show, which eventually became the Rain Broadway run from 2010 to 2011. Rain claimed that Let It Be was essentially the same concept, with similar artwork, costumes, and virtually the same song repertoire, and that Rain was entitled to 50% of Let It Be's profits." The case was settled out of court.
