= EMMA for Peace =

Non-profit organisation

- Abbreviation: EMMA for Peace
- Formation: 2013
- Type: Nonprofit organization for music
- Legal status: Active
- Headquarters: Rome, Italy
- Location: Italy
- Region served: Mediterranean regions, Middle East
- Key people: Paolo Petrocelli (founder and president); Riccardo Muti (honorary president)
- Website: www.emmaforpeace.org

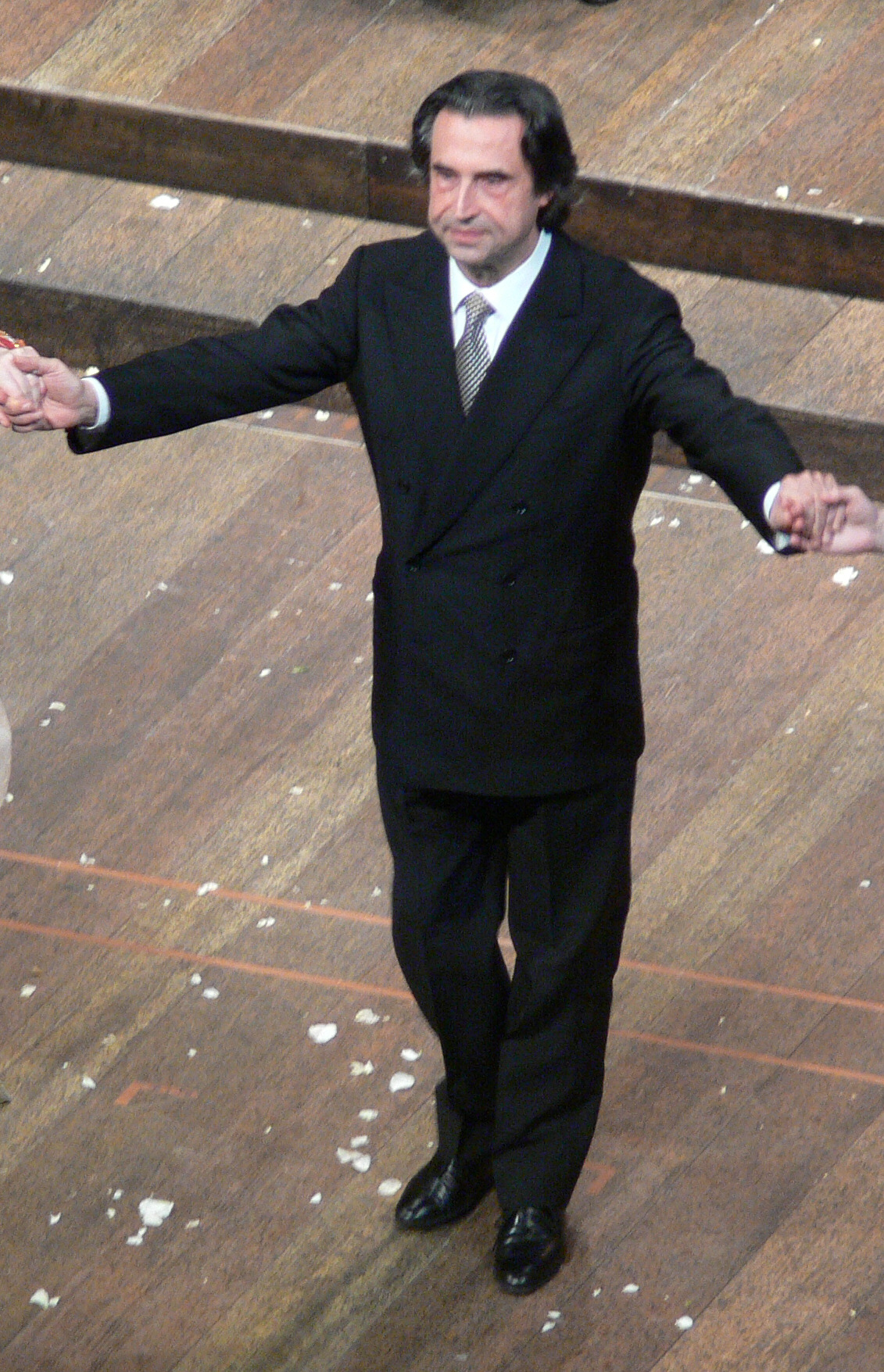
Riccardo Muti

EMMA for Peace, or the Euro Mediterranean Music Academy, is an international nonprofit organization to promote peace through music diplomacy and education in Europe, the Middle East and the Mediterranean region.

== History ==
EMMA for Peace was founded by Paolo Petrocelli in 2012 and launched during the 13th World Summit of Nobel Peace Laureates in Warsaw, Poland. Italian conductor Riccardo Muti serves as the honorary president of the organization.

== Activities ==
EMMA for Peace develops cultural and educational initiatives in collaboration with national and international institutions.

In 2013, in collaboration with UNESCO and the Secretary General of the Council of Europe, EMMA for Peace organized the opening concert of the 13th World Summit of Nobel Peace Laureates in Warsaw.

That same year, the organization partnered with UNICEF to design a music education programme supporting Syrian children in refugee camps in Lebanon, Jordan and Turkey. The initiative included benefit concerts in Europe featuring Syrian musicians.

In 2014, EMMA for Peace participated in International Jazz Day, and developed a project with UNHCR in Malta to support young refugees in the Mediterranean region.

In the same year, EMMA for Peace collaborate with Cairo Opera House and La Scala Theatre in Milan, organizing an opera gala concert in Cairo featuring young singers from the La Scala Theatre Academy. It presented “Opera for Peace”, an educational project to introduce opera and musical professions to students and young people in refugee communities in Jordan, Lebanon, Egypt, Morocco, Palestine and Turkey.

In 2015, EMMA for Peace participated in celebrating the 70th anniversary of UNESCO with a concert at Carnegie Hall in New York featuring the Korean Chamber Orchestra.

In 2018, the organization co-organized a charity concert in Milan with UNHCR in support of Syrian refugees, as a result of a collaboration between Italian and Syrian artists.

In 2019, EMMA for Peace organized a concert by the European Union Youth Orchestra (EUYO) at the Royal Opera House Muscat in Oman, featuring soprano Kristine Opolais and conducted by Vasily Petrenko.

In 2020, EMMA for Peace launched an online platform dedicated to music diplomacy.

In 2021, EMMA for Peace participated in the Abu Dhabi Festival with a project by Emirati composer Ihab Darwish presented as a virtual concert. The initiative brought together 128 musicians from 20 countries performing 13 original compositions.

In 2024, EMMA for Peace participated in the MED Conference in Rome, organized by the Italian Ministry of Foreign Affairs and Institute for International Political Studies.
