= Humare Ram =

Indian Hindi-language stage production based on the Ramayana

- Original language: Hindi
- Written by: Rahul Bhuchar, Naresh Katyayan
- Based on: Ramayana by Valmiki
- Music by: Udbhav Ojha, Saurabh Mehta
- Lyrics by: Ram Kumar Singh, Aalok Shrivastav
- Chorus: Felicity Theatre
- Genre: Mythological drama
- Setting: Ancient India

Premiere
- Date: January 25, 2024
- Place: Kamani Auditorium
- Directed by: Gaurav Bhardwaj

Humare Ram is an Indian historical play directed by Gaurav Bhardwaj and produced by Rahul Bhuchar under the banner of Felicity Theatre, with Ashutosh Rana as Ravan and Rahul Bhuchar as Ram. The production presents a theatrical interpretation of the Ramayana, emphasizing the prospectives and emotional journeys of its primary characters. Since its debut in 2024, in Kamani Auditorium, the play has been staged in several prominent venues, including NMAAC, Mumbai and Dubai Opera in August 2025

In July 2026, the theatrical production is scheduled for a series of international performances in London. In London, the show will be premiere on 9 July and will stage from 9 July to 12 July at Eventim Apollo.

== Synopsis and production ==
The narrative presents selected episodes from Valmiki's Ramayana, including sequences involving Lava and Kusha and depictions of Ravana's perspective, using modern-day facilities such as large LED visuals and choreographed set-pieces. The production is directed by Gaurav Bhardwaj and produced by Rahul Bhuchar under banner of Felicity Theatre.

== Cast ==
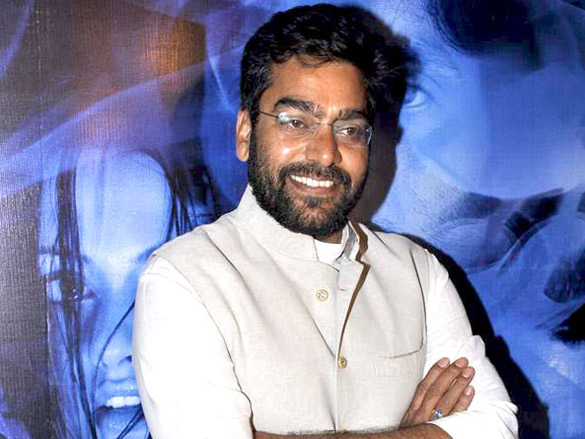
Ashutosh Rana, who plays Ravana in Humare Ram.

- Ashutosh Rana as Ravana

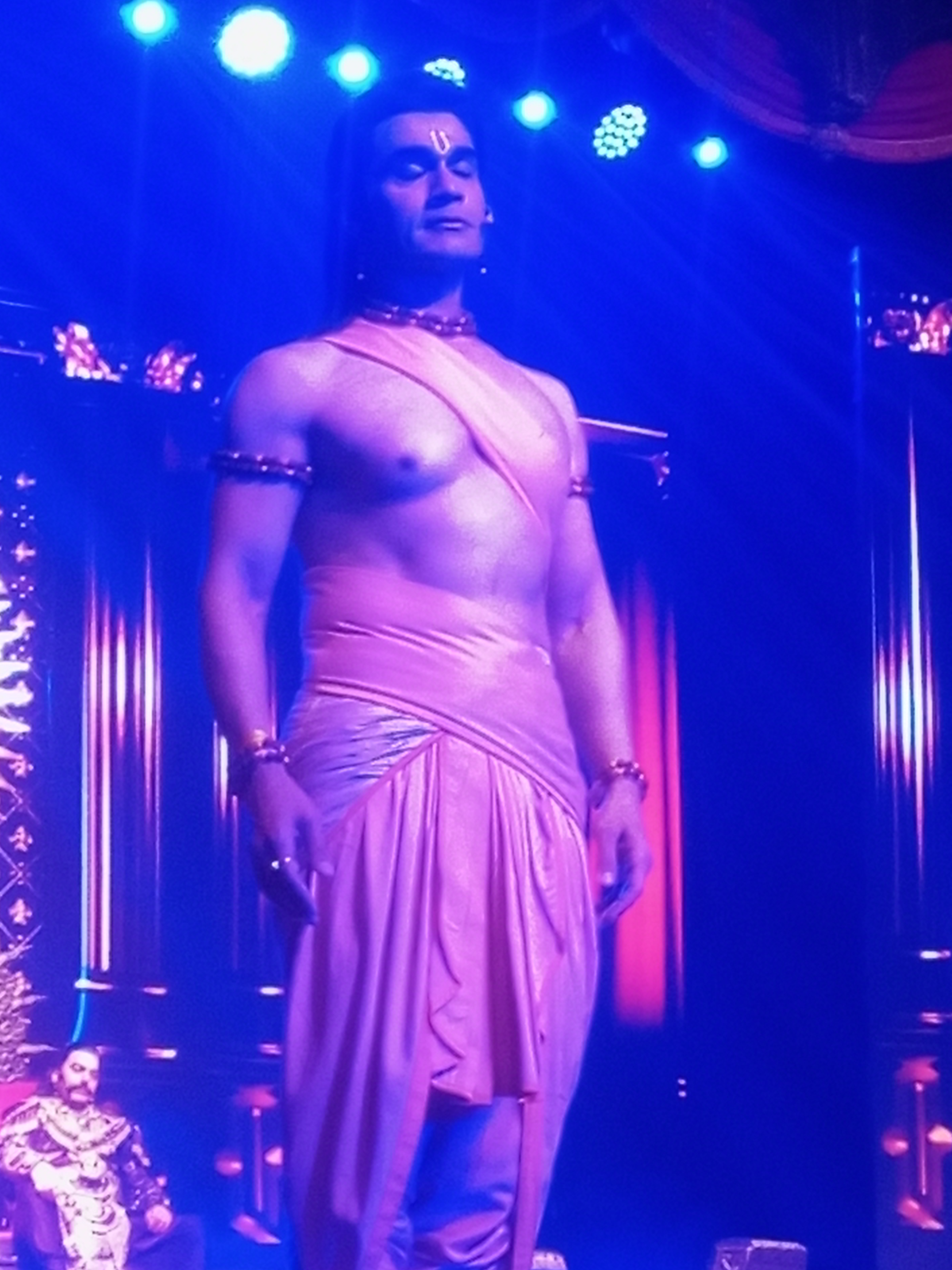
Rahul Bhuchar as Rama

- Rahul Bhuchar as Rama
- Danish Akhtar as Hanuman
- Tarun Khanna as Shiva
- Harleen Kaur Rekhi and Amrita Parihar as Sita.
- Karan Sharma as Surya

== Music ==
Humare Ram was released as a six-track extended play (EP) by T-Series on 9 October 2024. It features vocals by Shankar Mahadevan, Sonu Nigam and Kailash Kher, among others.

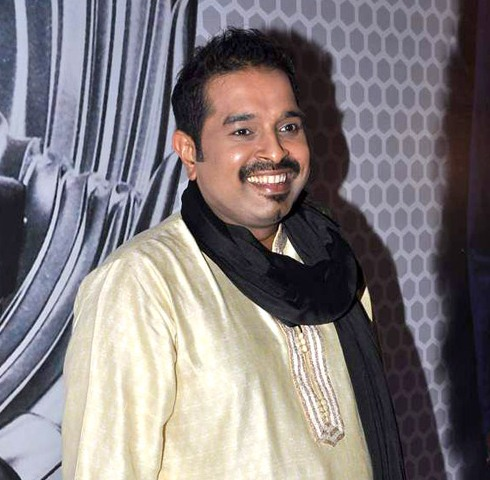
Shankar Mahadevan, the lead vocalist of Humare Ram

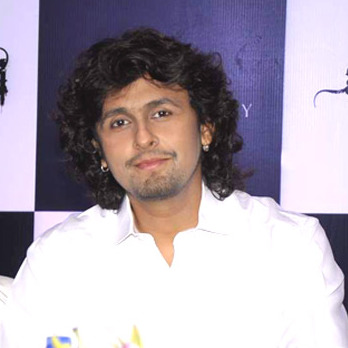
Sonu Nigam, the lead vocalist of Ramleela

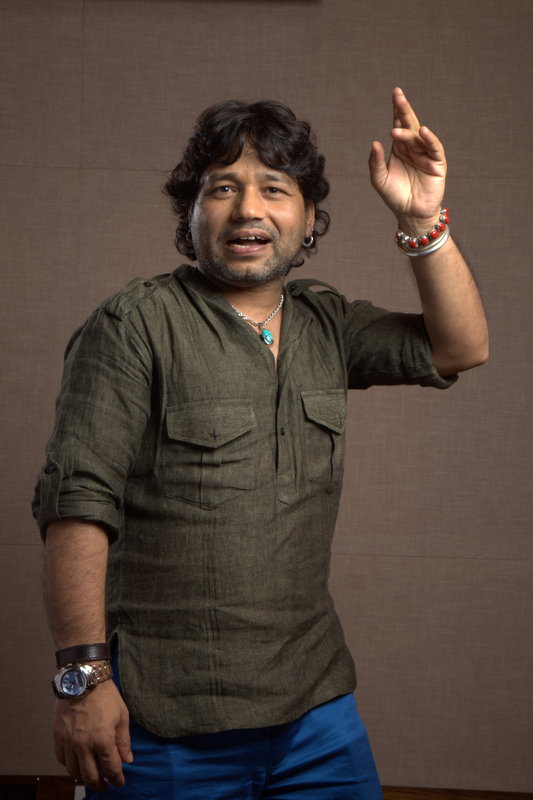
Kailash Kher, the lead vocalist of Dashanan

All lyrics are written by Ram Kumar Singh, Aalok Shrivastav; all music is composed by Udbhav Ojha, Saurabh Mehta.

No.	Title	Lead vocals	Length
1.	"Humare Ram"	Shankar Mahadevan	2:38
2.	"Ramleela"	Sonu Nigam	4:36
3.	"Dashanan"	Kailash Kher	7:00
4.	"Hanuman Chalisa"	Uddhav Ojha	4:07
5.	"Ram Setu"	Diptanshu Tiwari	2:50
6.	"Nikumbhala"	Suvarna Tiwari	1:26
Total length:			22:37

== Performances ==
Humare Ram has been performed in over 450 different shows since its premiere in January 2024. The play premiered 25–28 January 2024, with seven shows at the Kamani Auditorium in New Delhi. The play has been shown at Mumbai in several theatres including the Jamshed Bhabha Theatre, the National Centre for the Performing Arts, and the Nita Mukesh Ambani Cultural Centre. The international debut of the play was at the Dubai Opera, 14–17 August 2025.

== Reception ==
Coverage in Indian media described the production's large-scale staging and digital backdrops, and highlighted Ashutosh Rana's portrayal of Ravan. India Today profiled the show's structure and audience response in November 2024, while The Statesman previewed Kolkata performances in May 2025, noting the show's original songs and staging scale. Ahead of the Dubai Opera run, The National (UAE) described the production as a "hit" making its international debut.

== See also ==
- Versions of the Ramayana
- Ramlila
