= Charumitra (play) =

Play by Ram Kumar Verma

Charumitra is a Hindi language historical play in one act by Ram Kumar Verma (b. 1905); a well known Hindi poet, playwright, critic, and historian. Sources give conflicting accounts to its date, with some sources giving the year as 1941 and others as 1942. Widely recognized as a masterpiece of modern Hindi theatre, an excerpt from the play was included in Modern Indian Literature, an Anthology: Plays and prose (1992). Ram Kumar Verma adapted the work into the English language, organizing the play in three acts and publishing it in 1957. The English translation of the play was acquired by the Library of Congress in 1978.

The play is titled after the fictional character of Charumitra who is a maid servant to the historical figure of Tishyaraksha, the last wife of the third Mauryan emperor Ashoka (emperor of Magadha). The play takes place in the thirteenth year of Ashoka's reign in the 3rd century BCE with Charumitra acting as a foil to the historical figures at the center of the play.
