= Jamie Allan (magician) =

English magician (born 1977)

- Born: Jamie Allan Nicklin; February 15, 1977 (age 49)
- Occupation: Magician
- Known for: Fusion of magic and technology
- Notable work: iMagician: The Evolution of Magic

Jamie Allan (born February 15, 1977) is an English-born magician. He performs modern illusions with iPads, laser beams, Facebook and Twitter. He has appeared on various TV shows and has worked alongside various other entertainers and performers and designed illusions and effects for them. He has also worked in many aspects of the entertainment industry, as performer, producer, writer and director. He created and co-wrote the musical Houdini.

== Biography ==
Jamie Allan was born on 15 February 1977 in England to Alan James Nicklin and Kay Kennedy. His father was the leader of the show band Second City Sound and Touch of Velvet. His mother was a singer. He has two sons.

== Professional life ==
Allan performed his first magic show at just 8 years old in Cabaret Club in Market Bosworth. Since then he has performed worldwide on TV shows and theatres including headlining London Palladium. He has designed special effects and stage illusions for performers in the entertainment and corporate worlds, including making the new Mercedes M class appear from thin air at the UK launch, designing laser technology for the show Lumina the Laser Violinist and vanishing and reproducing a US$250,000 Robinson R22 helicopter live on the stage of the RMS Queen Mary 2 during her maiden voyage. He designed stage illusions for performers and entertainers including Sting, Tim Minchin, Katherine Jenkins, Lulu, Blue, Leona Lewis, Billy Ocean and Jools Holland. He has appeared on various TV shows like Get your Act Together, The Alan Titchmarsh Show (ITV), The One Show (BBC), BBC Breakfast (BBC), 'Le PLus Grand Cabaret Du Monde' (France 2), This Morning (ITV), The Slammer (CBBC) and Mega Clever - Die NKL-Show.

Inspired by the illusionist and escapologist Harry Houdini, Allan created and co-wrote the musical Houdini and was responsible for overseeing special effects for the production. He also created a comic strip series of the same name. He was among the magicians who performed at the grand magical show Impossible.
