= Dubai Opera =

Performing arts center

- Interactive map of the Dubai Opera area
- Former names: Dubai Opera House

General information
- Type: Multi-format venue
- Classification: Arts complex
- Location: Downtown Dubai, Sheikh Mohammed bin Rashid Boulevard, United Arab Emirates
- Coordinates: 25°11′44.2″N 55°16′18.8″E
- Construction started: April 2013
- Completed: August 2016
- Opened: 31 August 2016
- Operator: Paolo Petrocelli

Technical details
- Size: 60,000 m^{2} (650,000 sq ft)

Design and construction
- Developer: Emaar Properties
- Engineer: Atkins
- Services engineer: ThyssenKrupp (Stage engineering and systems); BK Gulf (MEP contractor); LSI Projects (Audio & Lighting Systems)
- Other designers: Theatre Projects (Theatre consultant); MLC International (Cost consultant) Sandy Brown Associates (Acoustic Consultant), neolight global limited (lighting designers)
- Main contractor: Consolidated Contractors Company (CCC)

Other information
- Seating capacity: 2,000

Website
- www.dubaiopera.com

Dubai Opera is a 2,000-seat, multi-format, performing arts centre located within The Opera District in Downtown Dubai. It was developed by Emaar Properties to host a variety of performances and events including theatre, opera, ballet, concerts, conferences and exhibitions. Its plans were announced by Sheikh Mohammed bin Rashid Al Maktoum in March 2012 and it was completed in 2016. It opened on 31 August 2016 with a performance by Plácido Domingo. The first season featured Bizet's The Pearl Fishers opera and tenor José Carreras. Dubai Opera has flat floor capacity of 1,800 m^{2} (19,000 sq ft). This floor can be hired for weddings, gala dinners, fashion shows and exhibitions. The building is created by Atkins and principal architect Janus Rostock, allows it to transform into three modes: a theatre, a music hall, and a banquet or event hall in a 'flat floor' mode.

== History ==
In January 2015, Emaar named Jasper Hope as the Chief Executive of Dubai Opera. Hope was the COO of London's Royal Albert Hall. Consolidated Contractors Company (CCC) was the main contractor for the development, having worked with Emaar in building the Dubai Mall.

An earlier proposal to build a cultural centre on an island in the Dubai Creek designed by architect Zaha Hadid was announced in 2008 and shelved during the property crash in Dubai. This venue, located in The Lagoons, would have accommodated an opera house with a 2,500 seating capacity, an 800-seat playhouse, a 5,017 m^{2} (54,000 sq ft) arts gallery, a performing arts school, and a '6-star' themed hotel.

The first Emirati singer to appear at Dubai Opera was Hussain Al Jassmi on 10 October 2016.

Shortly after that, the award-winning hit musical Les Misérables ran for three weeks.

In 2017 the venue staged the inaugural BBC Proms Dubai - just the second time ever that the United Kingdom's premier classical music series hosted events abroad in its 112-year history.

Dubai Opera's longest running show was the Phantom of the Opera in late 2019.

In just under 4 years of operation, Dubai Opera has won a number of awards including 'Best Theatrical Performance' at the Timeout Dubai Nightlife Awards 2017 for Les Misérables, 'Favorite Show' at the 2017 What's On Awards Dubai for Les Misérables, and 'Best Theatrical Performance' at the Timeout Dubai Music and Nightlife Awards 2019 for Othello.

As per 2023, the Italian cultural manager Paolo Petrocelli serves as the Head of Dubai Opera. For his contributions to the development of the organization, Paolo Petrocelli has been nominated in 2024 by Fast Company among the most creative people in business in the Middle East.

The 2023-24 season of Dubai Opera featured a record-breaking 250,000 audience members, the highest number since its opening in 2016.

In 2025, the Indian stage production Humare Ram, produced by Rahul Bhuchar, made its international debut at Dubai Opera.

== Building ==
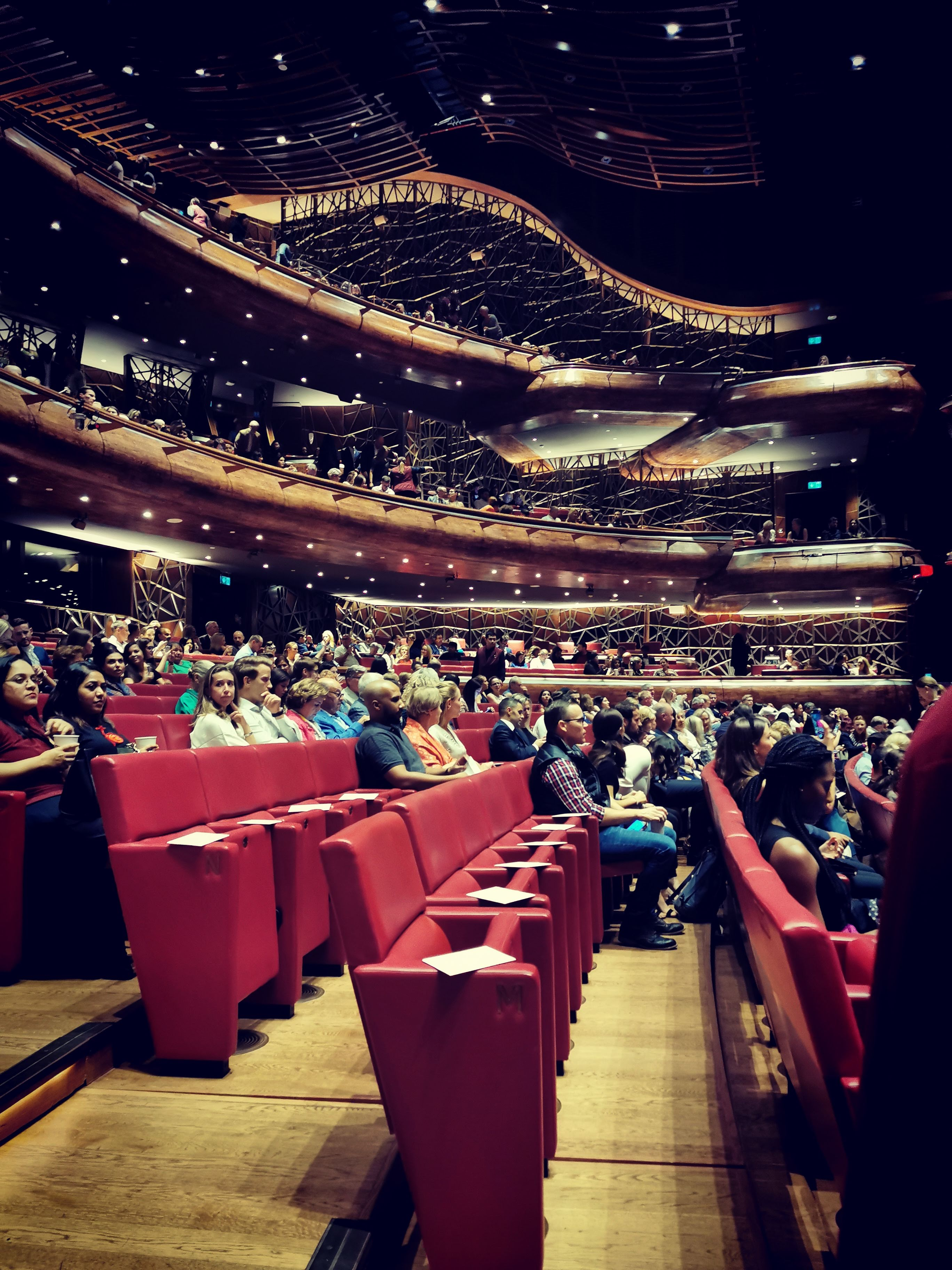
Inside the Dubai Opera

Dubai Opera is part of The Opera District within Downtown Dubai. The 1901-seat performing arts centre was designed by Janus Rostock of Atkins. The theatre was conceived and briefed by Theatre Projects Consultants, it can be converted into a traditional theatre, concert hall, banquet hall or exhibition space. Using hydraulic lifts and seating wagons to relocate 900 of the 2,000 seats, the space can be used for other events while the extra seating is stored in garages beneath the theatre. It has 1,800-square-metre flat floor space which can hold up to 1,000 or more people for weddings, gala dinners, fashion shows, product launches, exhibitions and more.

Dubai Opera is designed to resemble a dhow, a traditional sailing vessel, in which the 'bow' of the structure houses the opera's main stage, orchestra and seating, while the elongated 'hull' has waiting areas, a taxi "rank" or drop-off and pick-up areas, and parking. It also boasts a rooftop restaurant with views of the Burj Khalifa.

== The Opera District ==
The Dubai Opera at night

The Opera District was launched by Emaar Properties in Downtown Dubai in 2013. Aside from Dubai Opera, the district, which faces Burj Khalifa and The Dubai Fountain, includes art galleries, museums, design studios, and other cultural venues. The area includes several hotels, a retail plaza, recreational spaces and residential towers.

Dubai has more than 50 art galleries and hosts cultural events such as Dubai Design Week, Art Dubai, and the SIKKA Art Fair.

== See also ==
- Art in Dubai
- Culture of Dubai
